= Thomas Nash (relative of Shakespeare) =

First husband of William Shakespeare's granddaughter Elizabeth

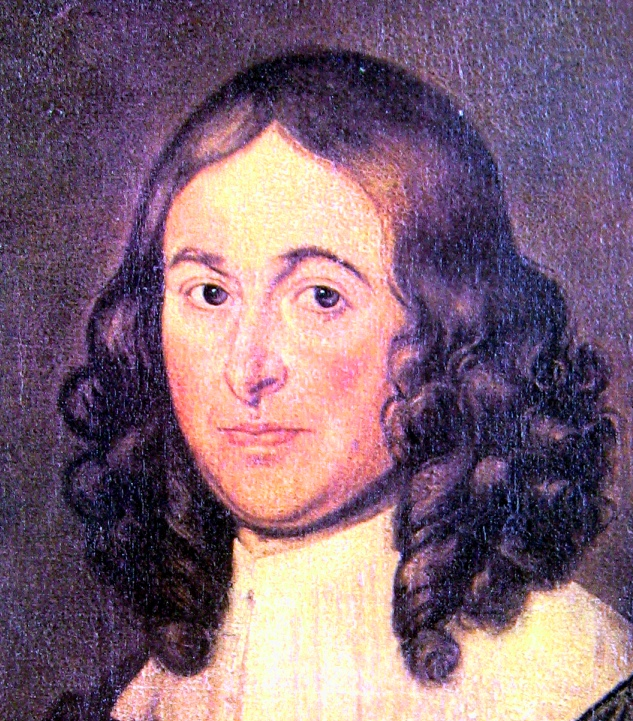
- Thomas Nash, c. 1635
- Born: Stratford-upon-Avon, England
- Baptised: 20 June 1593
- Died: 4 April 1647 (aged 53); Stratford-upon-Avon, England
- Occupation: Possibly an assistant to the High Sheriff of Warwickshire
- Spouse: Elizabeth Hall

Thomas Nash (baptised 20 June 1593 – died 4 April 1647) was the first husband of William Shakespeare's granddaughter Elizabeth Barnard. He lived most of his life in Stratford-upon-Avon, and was the dominant male figure amongst Shakespeare's senior family line after the death of Dr. John Hall, Shakespeare's son-in-law, in 1635.

== Early life ==
Nash was baptised at the parish church of the Holy Trinity in Stratford-upon-Avon and entered in the register as "Thomas filius Anthonij Nash generosi", i.e. "Thomas, son of Anthony Nash gentleman". His mother's maiden name was Mary Baugh and she came from Twyning, near Tewkesbury in Gloucestershire. His father Anthony, a friend of Shakespeare and farmer of his tithes, was born in Old Stratford. Nash entered Lincoln's Inn, one of the four Inns of Court in London, on 15 May 1616 at the age of 22.

== Career of Nash ==
Nash was called to the bar on 25 November 1623, but there is no evidence that he ever went on to practice law. The Oxford Dictionary of National Biography says that he may however have taken over a rôle that his father held in being an agent for Sir John Hubaud, a High Sheriff of Warwickshire; but Sir John Hubaud died in 1583, ten years before Thomas was born.

When Nash's father died in 1622, he was bequeathed properties in Stratford: the Bear Inn (opposite the Swan) and a house in Bridge Street, and a piece of land called "the Butt Close by the Avon" where burghers used to shoot at archery butts. Thomas was an executor to his father's will. It appears that Thomas held on to the Bear Inn: his father-in-law, Dr. John Hall, once treated someone that he called one of Thomas's servants "lying at the Bear", presumably indicating that he was a publican or worker at that inn. Hall's first treatment for the poor heavily jaundiced servant elicited "seven Vomits", and this and a series of further treatments "cured him perfectly".

Nash was part of the 1633 triumvirate, along with John Hall and the vicar of Harbury, Richard Watts, that was to oversee the wranglings associated with Thomas Quiney and his lease on a house called The Cage. Nash apparently lived in the house now known as Nash's House, before moving in with his mother-in-law next door at New Place after the death of Dr. Hall in 1635. Nash is known to have been a declared royalist, a supporter of Charles I and indeed a donor to the king's cause to the tune of £100, which may have led to Queen Henrietta Maria and the king's entourage staying with Thomas and his family at New Place in July 1643.

According to Charlotte Carmichael Stopes, Nash's coat of arms was emblazoned "double quarterly of four, First, 1 and 4 argent on a chevron between three ravens' heads erased azure, a pellet between 4 cross-crosslets sable, for Nash; 2 and 3 sable a buck's head caboshed argent attired or, between his horns a cross patée, and across his mouth an arrow, Bulstrode. Second, 1 and 4, for Hall, 2 and 3 Shakespeare".

== Personal life ==
Portrait of Elizabeth Hall, Thomas Nash's wife

Nash married Elizabeth Hall on 22 April 1626 at Holy Trinity church in Stratford-upon-Avon. Elizabeth was Shakespeare's granddaughter through his eldest child Susanna and her husband John Hall. Writer Thomas de Quincey (1785–1859) later conjectured that this date was chosen to celebrate the birthday of Elizabeth's famous grandfather, who was baptised on 26 April, and whose birthday is traditionally celebrated on 23 April. Being 32 years old at the time of the marriage, Nash was 14 years older than his 18-year-old bride. They had no children, and Elizabeth lived to become the last surviving direct descendant of Shakespeare.

=== Death ===
Thomas Nash died in 1647, at the age of 53. In the will that he made on 20 August 1642 he bequeathed memorial rings (a common practice at the time) to Judith and Thomas Quiney, Shakespeare's younger daughter and son-in-law.

Less straightforwardly, he also bequeathed property that did not belong to him, leaving Shakespeare's house New Place, bequeathed by Shakespeare to his daughter, Nash's mother-in-law Susanna Hall and her direct heirs (i.e. daughter Elizabeth), Nash's wife, to his cousin Edward Nash. It has been speculated that this was due to Nash thinking that he would outlive Susanna and Elizabeth—in the event Nash predeceased them. Nash refers to Susanna in a letter as "Mrs. Hall, my mother-in-law, who lives with me", although she owned the house. Susanna successfully retained the house, which Shakespeare had bought in 1597 for £60, after it was proven in court that she was the legal owner and her daughter's late husband did not have the right to dispose of her property. Elizabeth inherited the estate on her mother's death in 1649. When Elizabeth died childless in 1670, ending Shakespeare's direct line of descendants, her will stipulated that Edward Nash would have the right to acquire New Place "according to my promise formally made to him", suggesting some spoken arrangement. However, there is no recorded mention of Edward owning New Place.

Nash's will was known about in the mid-19th century, but then disappeared, until it was rediscovered in an unmarked box in the National Archives in 2025 by historian Dan Gosling.

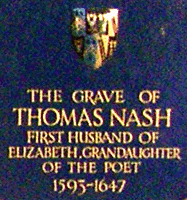
Information board placed on Nash's grave.

Nash was buried in the chancel of Holy Trinity, immediately to the left of Shakespeare's as one faces the altar. To be accorded this honour required some kind of position recognised by the church as fitting, such as holding parish tithes. His burial inscription and epitaph reads:

HEERE RESTETH YE BODY OF THOMAS
NASHE, ESQ. HE MAR. ELIZABETH, THE
DAVG: & HEIRE OF IOHN HALLE, GENT.
HE DIED APRIL 4. A. 1647, AGED 53.

Fata manent omnes, hunc non virtute carentum
vt ncque diuitiis, abstulit atra dies;
Abstulit, at referet lux ultima; siste viator,
si peritura paras per male parta peris.

His widow Elizabeth married for the second time two years later to John Bernard (MP for Northampton), and eventually became Lady Bernard. They lived in Elizabeth's property of New Place for a time.
