= All Is True =

2018 film by Kenneth Branagh

- Theatrical release poster
- Directed by: Kenneth Branagh
- Written by: Ben Elton
- Produced by: Tamar Thomas; Ted Gagliano
- Starring: Kenneth Branagh; Judi Dench; Ian McKellen
- Cinematography: Zac Nicholson
- Edited by: Úna Ní Dhonghaíle
- Music by: Patrick Doyle
- Production company: TKBC
- Distributed by: Sony Pictures Classics
- Release dates: 21 December 2018 (United States); 8 February 2019 (United Kingdom)
- Running time: 101 minutes
- Country: United Kingdom
- Language: English
- Box office: $3 million

All Is True is a 2018 British historical film directed by Kenneth Branagh and written by Ben Elton. It stars Branagh as playwright William Shakespeare. The film takes its title from an alternative name for Shakespeare's play Henry VIII.

== Plot ==
After the Globe Theatre burns down in 1613 during a performance of Shakespeare's play Henry VIII, William Shakespeare, aged 49, returns home from London to Stratford-upon-Avon to rejoin his wife, Anne Hathaway. Shakespeare and Anne have a distant relationship, as he has spent most of their marriage working in London, and she is a down-to-earth country woman who cannot read or write. Their marriage has never recovered from the death of their son Hamnet, aged 11, of plague in Stratford, while his father was in London. While they also have two daughters, Hamnet was Shakespeare's favourite child, especially because of the poems which he believes the child wrote. Shakespeare now devotes his time to tending to the family garden. In spite of his hard work he is not very successful.

The Shakespeares' elder daughter Susanna is married to a doctor named John Hall, who is a prominent Puritan in town. Susanna has to stifle her independence and her own personality to live by her husband's moral codes. She is accused of committing adultery with local haberdasher Rafe Smith and faces a public trial. Shakespeare terrifies her accuser by claiming that he knows an African actor who was once in love with Susanna and who would kill anyone who ruined her good name. The accuser fails to attend the hearing, as a consequence of which Susanna is acquitted. Anne is impressed by her husband's actions, especially as she knows that he was lying; the African actor was a gentle person who would never harm anyone.

Shakespeare's younger daughter, Judith (Hamnet's twin), is outspoken in her doubts about the role of women in Jacobean England. She has not been allowed to have an education or opportunities in life, because it is expected she will marry and provide children. She has refused to marry and is bitter at her father for not loving her as much as her dead brother. One night during an argument, Judith confesses to Shakespeare that it was she who wrote the poems, rather than her brother. They were in Hamnet's handwriting because Judith cannot read or write and dictated them to him. Anne agrees that Hamnet was not especially intelligent; they have hidden this from Shakespeare so he would be able to keep his fond memories.

The Shakespeares receive a visit from the Earl of Southampton, Shakespeare's former literary patron, to whom he wrote his 154 sonnets. This upsets Anne; she is aware of rumours that William and Southampton were lovers. While drinking with Southampton, Shakespeare recites his Sonnet 29, expressing his feelings for Southampton and hoping that Southampton felt the same way about him. Southampton cuts off the conversation and seems uncomfortable but as he leaves he also recites Sonnet 29, indicating to Shakespeare that he did have feelings for him.

After some time at home, Shakespeare and Anne grow closer and develop a mature relationship. Anne ultimately allows her husband to sleep with her in the family's second-best bed (the best bed is reserved for guests). Having fallen back in love with Anne, Shakespeare amends his will to make sure that she will receive this bed. Now that the truth has been told about the poems, Judith also develops a warmer relationship with her father. She agrees to marry a local man, Thomas Quiney, who has been her suitor for some time. Quiney's reputation is damaged when his former sweetheart gives birth to his illegitimate child and the baby and mother die during labour. Judith becomes pregnant by Quiney, much to Shakespeare's delight.

While researching, Shakespeare discovers that there was no notable plague outbreak in 1596, the year that Hamnet died. He becomes suspicious and questions his family. Anne tries to convince him that Hamnet died of plague but Judith confesses the truth. One day as a child, Judith told her brother that she was going to tell their father that Hamnet did not write the poems. That night, Hamnet went missing. He was found drowned in a nearby pond with the copies of the poems in the water with him. Hamnet would never normally enter the pond and so Anne and Judith suspect he killed himself. The women covered it up and told everyone that the boy had died of plague. Although it is an emotional revelation, the truth allows Shakespeare to finally come to terms with his son's death and to accept a more honest memory of the boy.

In April 1616 Shakespeare's fellow playwright Ben Jonson visits him and they reminisce about their lives. On the 23rd of April, Shakespeare's fifty-second birthday, he is feeling unwell. His wife and daughters gather to present him with a surprise. Susanna has been teaching Anne and Judith how to read and write. Susanna has found the Shakespeares' marriage certificate and Anne finally signs her name, where previously she had only been able to sign with an "X". Shakespeare dies that day. At his funeral, the three women recite the song "Fear No More" from Shakespeare's play Cymbeline. They are now all able to read.

== Cast ==
- Kenneth Branagh as William Shakespeare
- Judi Dench as Anne Hathaway
- Ian McKellen as The Earl of Southampton
- Lydia Wilson as Susanna Shakespeare
- Kathryn Wilder as Judith Shakespeare
- Jimmy Yuill as Edward Woolmer, curate at Holy Trinity, the Shakespeares' parish church
- Gerard Horan as Ben Jonson
- Hadley Fraser as John Hall
- Alex Macqueen as Sir Thomas Lucy
- Nonso Anozie as Actor playing Aaron
- John Dagleish as Rafe Smith
- Phil Dunster as Henry, the Student

== Production ==
It was announced on 30 October 2018 that Sony Pictures Classics would distribute the film, which Kenneth Branagh had already filmed without publicity, directing and starring alongside Judi Dench and Ian McKellen.

Dorney Court, a grade I listed Tudor manor house in Buckinghamshire, was a filming location.

== Release ==
The film was given a limited release in the US at the Laemmle Monica Film Center in Santa Monica from 21 to 27 December 2018, to qualify it for that year's Academy Awards. It screened as the Opening Night Gala feature at the Palm Springs Film Festival on 4 January 2019. It was released in the UK on 8 February 2019. It had a limited re-release in Los Angeles and New York in May 2019, followed by a wider US release. Its video release was distributed on 13 August 2019 by Sony Pictures Home Entertainment.

== Reception ==
=== Box office ===
All Is True grossed $1.2 million in the United States and Canada and $1.8 million in other territories for a worldwide total of $3 million.

=== Critical response ===
On review aggregator website Rotten Tomatoes, the film holds an approval rating of 72% based on 141 reviews, with an average rating of 6.6/10. The website's critics consensus reads, "Impressively cast and beautifully filmed, All Is True takes an elegiac look at Shakespeare's final days." On Metacritic, the film has a weighted average score of 59 out of 100, based on 32 critics, indicating "mixed or average reviews".

== See also ==
- Upstart Crow, a television series about Shakespeare also written by Ben Elton, and Elton's play The Upstart Crow
- Bingo: Scenes of Money and Death, a play by Edward Bond
- The Herbal Bed, a play by Peter Whelan
