= Quiney =

Quiney is a surname. Notable people with this surname include:

- Anthony Quiney (born 1935), a British architectural historian
- Carlos Quiney (1937–2007), a Spanish actor
- Judith Quiney (1585–1662), the younger daughter of William Shakespeare
- Thomas Quiney (1589–c. 1662), the husband of the above
- Rob Quiney (born 1982), a former Australian cricket player
