= Fulke Underhill =

- Born: baptised 28 January 1578
- Died: 21 March 1599 (aged 20–21); Warwick
- Buried: Idlicote, Warwickshire
- Father: William Underhill
- Mother: Mary Underhill

Fulke Underhill (1578–1599) was the son of William Underhill II of Warwickshire, owner of New Place in Stratford-Upon-Avon. His father sold New Place to William Shakespeare in 1597, and his brother Hercules Underhill confirmed the sale in 1602. Fulke was alleged to have murdered his father by poison, but sources differ on whether he was accused, tried, and hanged, or accused only after his death; see below.

== Family ==
Fulke Underhill, baptised 28 January 1578, was the eldest son and heir of William Underhill (d.1597) and Mary Underhill (buried 10 November 1590), daughter of Thomas Underhill of Ettington, Warwickshire. He had five brothers and three sisters:

- Hercules Underhill (1581–1650), who married Bridget Carlton, the daughter of Anthony Carleton of Brightwell Baldwin, Oxfordshire.
- Timothy Underhill (d.1658) of Idlicote.
- Ludowick (or Lewis) Underhill, citizen and haberdasher of London, living 1607.
- William Underhill (baptised 6 March 1588, d. 1656) of Ludlow, who married Hester Parker (1601–1641), daughter of Samuel Parker of Ludlow, mercer.
- Simon Underhill of Idlicote, (baptised 16 November 1589, d.1664), who married Elizabeth Hall (1585–1638), widow of Walter Savage (d.1622) of Broadway, and daughter of Richard Hall of Idlicote.
- Dorothy Underhill (baptised 18 May 1579).
- Elizabeth Underhill (baptised 10 November 1585, buried 25 November 1585).
- Valentine Underhill (baptised 17 February 1587), who married John Bolt.

Fulke Underhill's paternal grandparents were William Underhill (d. 31 March 1570) and Ursula Congreve (d. 13 May 1561), youngest daughter of John Congreve, esquire, of Stretton, Staffordshire; they had one son, William Underhill (d.1597), and four daughters. After Ursula Congreve's death, William Underhill married Dorothy Hatton (d.1569), widow of Richard Newport of Hunningham, Warwickshire, and sister of Sir Christopher Hatton, by whom he had no issue.

== Career ==
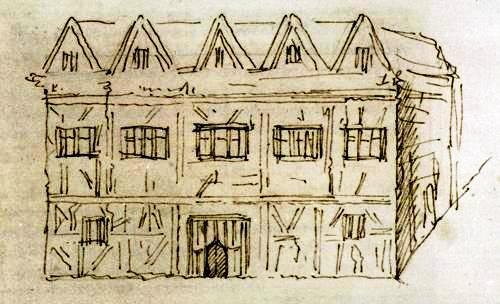
Sketch made in 1737 by George Vertue of New Place in Stratford upon Avon, sold to Shakespeare by Fulke Underhill's father in 1597

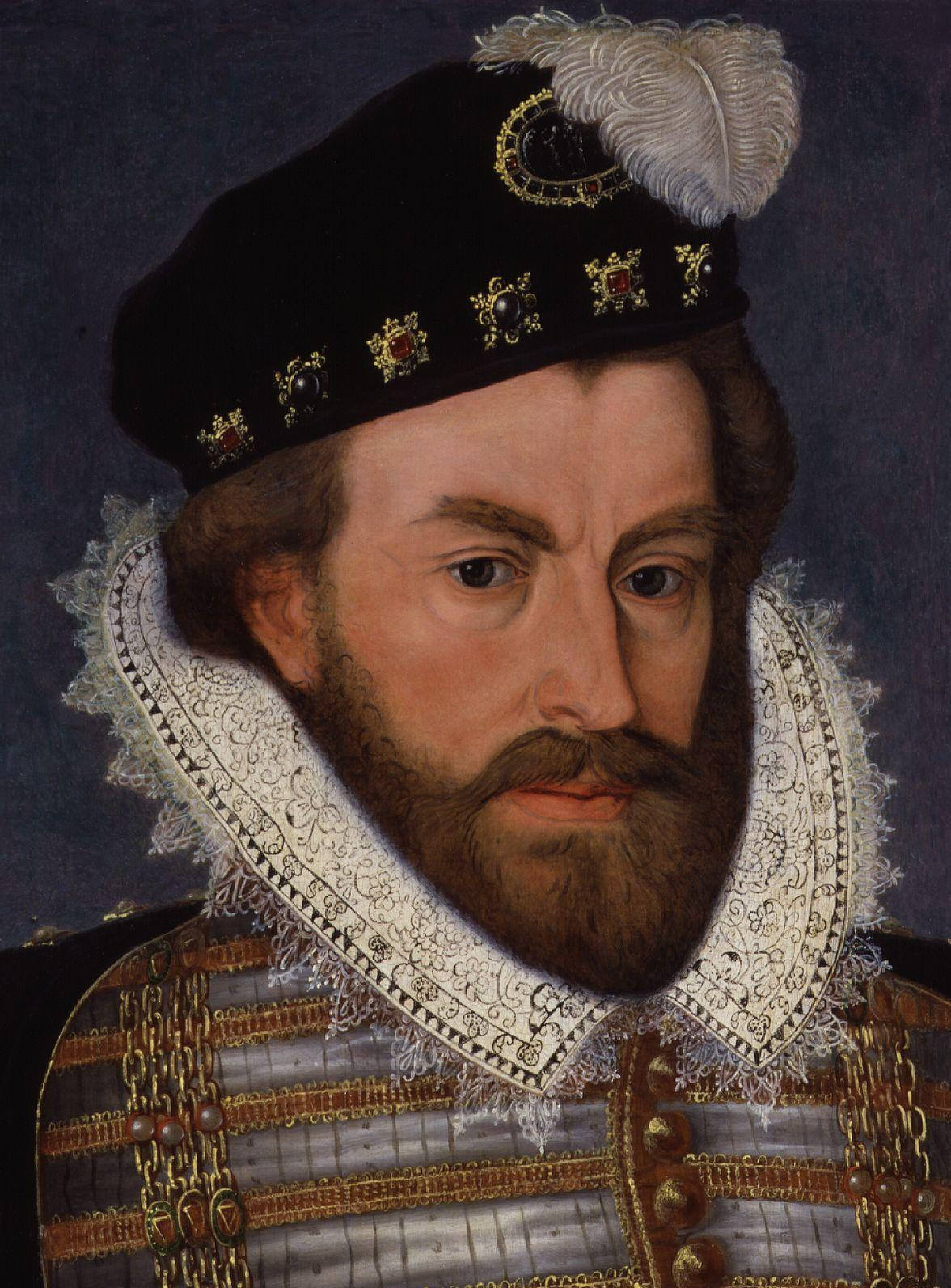
Sir Christopher Hatton, who purchased the wardship of Fulke Underhill's father

Fulke Underhill's paternal grandfather, William Underhill (c.1523 – 31 March 1570), was an Inner Temple lawyer and clerk of assizes at Warwick, and a substantial property holder in Warwickshire. Among his holdings was the manor of Idlicote, which he purchased from Lodovic Greville. He also held a 21-year lease on the manor of Newbold Revel from Thomas Throckmorton. In 1567 he purchased New Place in Stratford upon Avon from William Bott, agent of William Clopton, esquire. In addition to these properties he held the manors of Loxley and Barton-on-the-Heath, 'together with other houses and lands in Stratford, Hollington, Hardwick, Meriden, Haselor, Drayton and Easinghall'.

William Underhill died 31 March 1570, and was buried at Nether Ettington, where he and his first wife are commemorated by a marble monument. In his will he directed that his estates were not to be alienated by his heir save in circumstances of 'pressing need'. His three daughters were given marriage portions of five hundred pounds and a silver spoon apiece. His second daughter was given the wedding ring which had belonged to her stepmother, Dorothy Hatton, and his youngest daughter was given one of her mother Ursula Congreve's rings.

William Underhill (d.1597), his only son and heir, was sixteen years of age at his father's death in 1570, and became a ward of the crown. His wardship was purchased in 1571 by his stepmother Dorothy's Hatton's brother, Sir Christopher Hatton.

When he came of age in about 1575, William Underhill inherited his father's estates. Shortly thereafter he obtained licence to sell the manor of Loxley to Thomas Underhill, one of his cousins, and about that time married Mary Underhill (d.1590), another cousin. In 1579 he was imprisoned for recusancy, 'but being able to give an explanation to Burghley, was soon released'. In 1581, by reason of pressing financial circumstances, he was granted licence to alienate lands in Hollington and Meriden. In 1587 he was appointed escheator for Warwickshire and Leicestershire. In 1590 his wife, Mary, died. She was buried at Idlicote, and after her death he settled his estates in trust on his eldest son and heir, Fulke Underhill.

In Easter term 1597 William Underhill sold New Place to William Shakespeare for £60 by final concord dated 4 May (see Shakespeare Birthplace Trust MS, Item 1, Case 8). At the time of the sale the property consisted of one messuage, two barns and two gardens with their appurtenances.

=== Father's death and after ===
In July 1597 William Underhill was poisoned at Fillongley near Coventry, and on 6 July made a nuncupative will, naming as executors George Shirley and Thomas Shirley of Staunton Harold, Leicestershire. He left all his lands to his eldest son, Fulke Underhill, £200 apiece to each of his younger sons, and £500 apiece to his daughters Dorothy and Valentine. He died 7 July, and was buried with his wife at Idlicote.

According to Stopes, Fulke Underhill died without issue in May 1598, while still underage, leaving his brother Hercules as his heir, and was not at first suspected of having poisoned his father; however 'either through his own confession or the evidence of others, his guilt afterwards became known', and in 1602 the Court of Exchequer appointed a commission to 'obtain an account of the possessions of Fulke Underhill of Fillongley, county Warwick, felon, who had taken the life of his father, William Underhill, by poison'. As evidence that Fulke Underhill died at Warwick in May 1598, Stopes writes:

From Mr. Savage's "Churchwardens' Accounts of St. Nicholas, Warwick," we find that sixpence was received "for tolling the great bell for Vouckas Underhill, May, 1598." He was, however, buried at Idlicote.

In contrast to Stopes, Schoenbaum states that the crime was discovered before Fulke Underhill's death, and that he was prosecuted for it and hanged at Warwick in 1599, and attainted of felony, whereby his estates escheated to the crown, which regranted them to his brother, Hercules Underhill, when he came of age in 1602.

In Michaelmas term 1602, Hercules Underhill confirmed the sale of New Place to William Shakespeare by final concord; to obtain clear title, Shakespeare paid a fee equal to one quarter of the yearly value of the property, 'the peculiar circumstances of the case causing some doubt on the validity of the original purchase'.
