= Thomas Quiney =

Husband of Shakespeare's younger daughter

- Born: Stratford-upon-Avon, England
- Baptised: 26 February 1589
- Died: 1662 or 1663 (aged 73 or 74); Stratford-upon-Avon, England
- Occupations: Vintner and tobacconist
- Known for: Son-in-law of William Shakespeare
- Spouse: Judith Shakespeare (m. 1616; died 1662)
- Children: 3

Thomas Quiney (baptised 26 February 1589 – c. 1662 or 1663) was the husband of William Shakespeare's daughter Judith Shakespeare, and a vintner and tobacconist in Stratford-upon-Avon. Quiney held several municipal offices in the corporation of Stratford-upon-Avon, the highest being chamberlain in 1621 and 1622, but was also fined for various minor offences.

In 1616, Quiney married Judith Shakespeare. The marriage took place during a season when a special licence was required by the church, and the couple had failed to obtain one, leading to Quiney's brief excommunication. Quiney was also summoned before the Bawdy Court less than two months after the wedding to answer charges of "carnal copulation" with a Margaret Wheeler, who died in childbirth. Scholars believe that as a result of these events William Shakespeare altered his will to favour his other daughter, Susanna Hall, and excluded Quiney from his inheritance.

Judith and Thomas had three children: Shakespeare, Richard, and Thomas. Shakespeare Quiney died at six months of age, and neither Richard nor Thomas lived past 21. The death of Judith's last child led to legal wrangling over William Shakespeare's will that lasted until 1652. Scholars speculate that Thomas Quiney may have died in 1662 or 1663 when the burial records are incomplete.

== Birth and early life ==
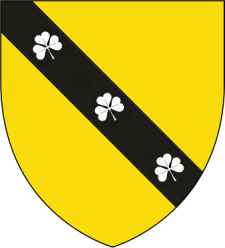
Quiney family coat of arms. "Or, on a bend sable, three trefoils slipped argent."

Thomas Quiney was born in Stratford-upon-Avon and baptised on 26 February 1589 in Holy Trinity Church. He was the son of Richard and Elizabeth Quiney. He had 10 siblings, among them a Richard Quiney who was a grocer in London, Mary Quiney who later married Richard Watts, the vicar of Harbury, and Elizabeth Quiney who married William Chandler. There is no record of Thomas Quiney's attendance at the local school, but he had sufficient education to write short passages in French, run a business, and hold several municipal offices in his life.

== Business and municipal offices ==
Quiney was a vintner and dealt in tobacco. He held the lease to a house known as "Atwood's" for the purpose of running a tavern, and later traded houses with his brother-in-law, William Chandler, for the larger house known as "The Cage" where he set up his vintner's shop in the upper half. He is recorded as selling wine to the corporation of Stratford-upon-Avon as late as 1650.

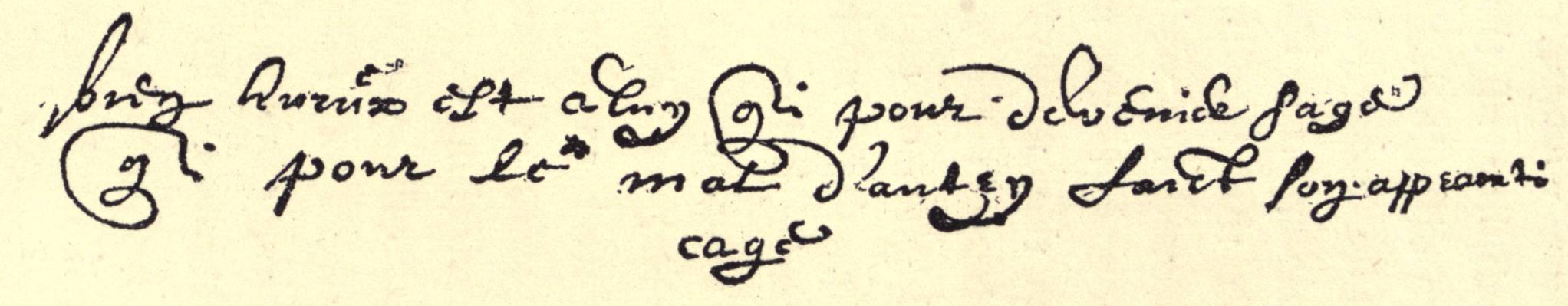
Facsimile of Quiney's couplet in French for the accounts of 1622–23.

He was a man of some education, with knowledge of French and calligraphy. In signing his accounts for 1621 and 1622 as chamberlain, he decorated them with a couplet in French from a romance by Mellin de Saint-Gelais. Quiney writes "Bien heureux est celui qui pour devenir sage, Qui pour le mal d'autrui fait son apprentissage" but the original is "Heureux celui qui pour devenir sage, Du mal d'autrui fait son apprentissage". The original translates into English as "Happy is he who to become wise, serves his apprenticeship from other men's troubles" but Quiney's version "... is ungrammatical and without sense".

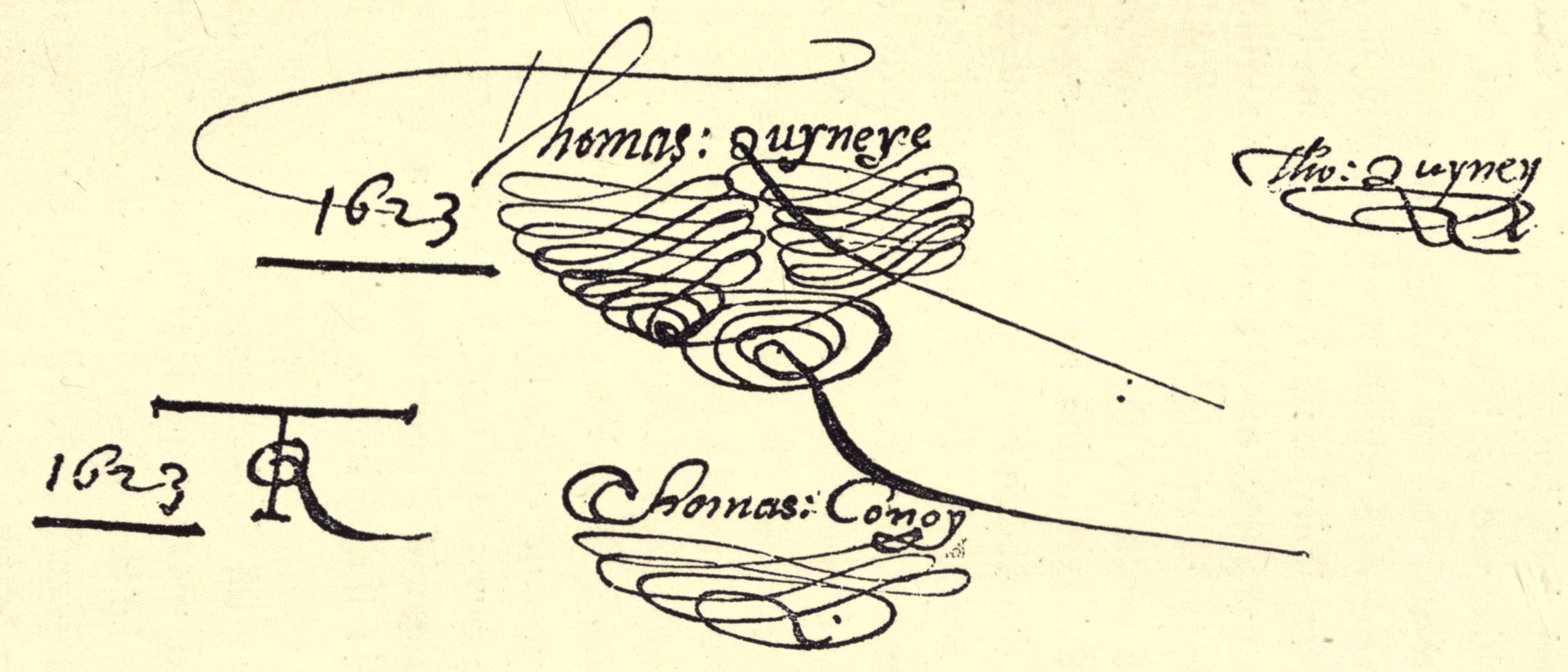
Facsimile of Quiney's signature "with flourishes" from the accounts of 1622–1623.

He was a well-respected man in the borough, and was elected a burgess and constable in Stratford-upon-Avon in 1617. In 1621 and 1622 he was acting chamberlain. In signing his accounts for 1622–1623, he did so "with flourishes", but the records show that the council voted them "imperfect". Quiney did not attend this meeting, but he did attend the later meeting where the accounts were passed, so they appear to have needed further explanation.

Quiney's reputation was slightly spotted; he was fined for swearing and for "suffering townsmen to tipple in his house", and was at one point in danger of prosecution for "dispensing unwholesome and adulterated wine".

== Marriage ==
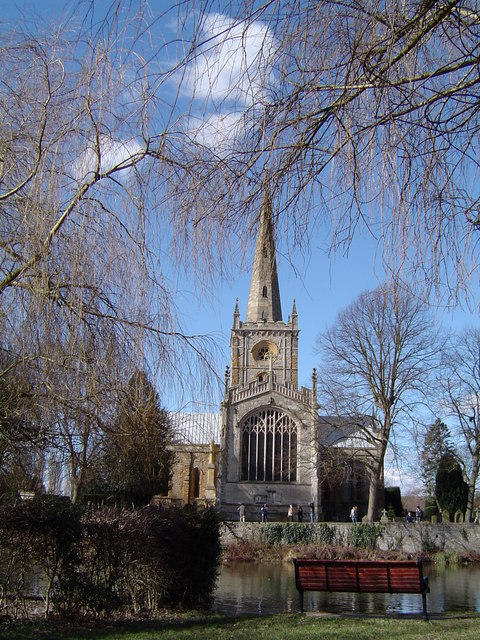
Holy Trinity Church, Stratford-upon-Avon, where Quiney was married. Viewed from the opposite bank of the River Avon.

On 10 February 1616, Thomas Quiney married Judith Shakespeare, William Shakespeare's daughter, in Holy Trinity Church. The assistant vicar, Richard Watts, who later married Quiney's sister Mary, probably officiated. The wedding took place during the Lenten season, during which marriage was prohibited. In 1616 Lent started on 23 January, Septuagesima Sunday, and ended on 7 April, the Sunday after Easter. The marriage therefore required a special licence, issued by the Bishop of Worcester, which the couple had failed to obtain. A Walter Wright of Stratford was cited for marrying without either banns or licence, so since Quiney was only cited for marrying without the required licence it is presumed that they had posted banns in church. The infraction was a minor one, apparently caused by the minister, as three other couples were also wed that February. Quiney was nevertheless summoned by Walter Nixon to appear before the consistory court in Worcester. (This same Walter Nixon was later involved in a Star Chamber case and was found guilty of forging signatures and taking bribes). Quiney failed to appear by the required date. The register recorded the judgement, which was excommunication, on or about 12 March 1616. It is unknown if Judith was also excommunicated, but in any case the punishment did not last long. In November of the same year they were back in church for the baptism of their firstborn child.

The marriage did not begin well: Quiney had recently impregnated another woman, Margaret Wheeler, who was to die in childbirth along with the child and was buried on 15 March 1616. On 26 March 1616, Quiney appeared before the Bawdy Court, which dealt, among other things, with "whoredom and uncleanliness". Confessing in open court to "carnal copulation" with Margaret Wheeler, he submitted himself for correction. He was sentenced to open penance "in a white sheet (according to custom)" before the congregation on three Sundays. He also had to admit to his crime, this time wearing ordinary clothes, before the Minister of Bishopton in Warwickshire. The first part of the sentence was remitted, essentially letting him off with a five-shilling fine to be given to the parish's poor. Since Bishopton only had a chapel, he was spared any public humiliation.

== Chapel Lane, Atwood's and The Cage ==
Where the Quineys lived after being married is unknown. Judith owned her father's cottage on Chapel Lane, Stratford, while Thomas had held, since 1611, the lease on a tavern called "Atwood's" on High Street. The cottage later passed from Judith to her sister as part of the settlement in their father's will. In July 1616 Thomas swapped houses with his brother-in-law, William Chandler, moving his vintner's shop to the upper half of a house at the corner of High Street and Bridge Street. Known as "The Cage", it is the house traditionally associated with Judith Quiney. In the 20th century The Cage was for a time a Wimpy restaurant before being turned into the Stratford Information Office.

The Cage provides further insight into why Shakespeare would not have trusted Judith's husband. Around 1630 Quiney tried to sell the lease on the house but was prevented by his kinsmen. In 1633, to protect the interests of Judith and the children, the lease was signed over to the trust of three relatives: John Hall, Susanna's husband; Thomas Nash, the husband of Judith's niece; and Richard Watts, vicar of nearby Harbury, who was Quiney's brother-in-law and who had officiated at Thomas and Judith's wedding. Eventually, in November 1652, the lease to The Cage ended up in the hands of Thomas' eldest brother, Richard Quiney, a grocer in London.

== William Shakespeare's last will and testament ==
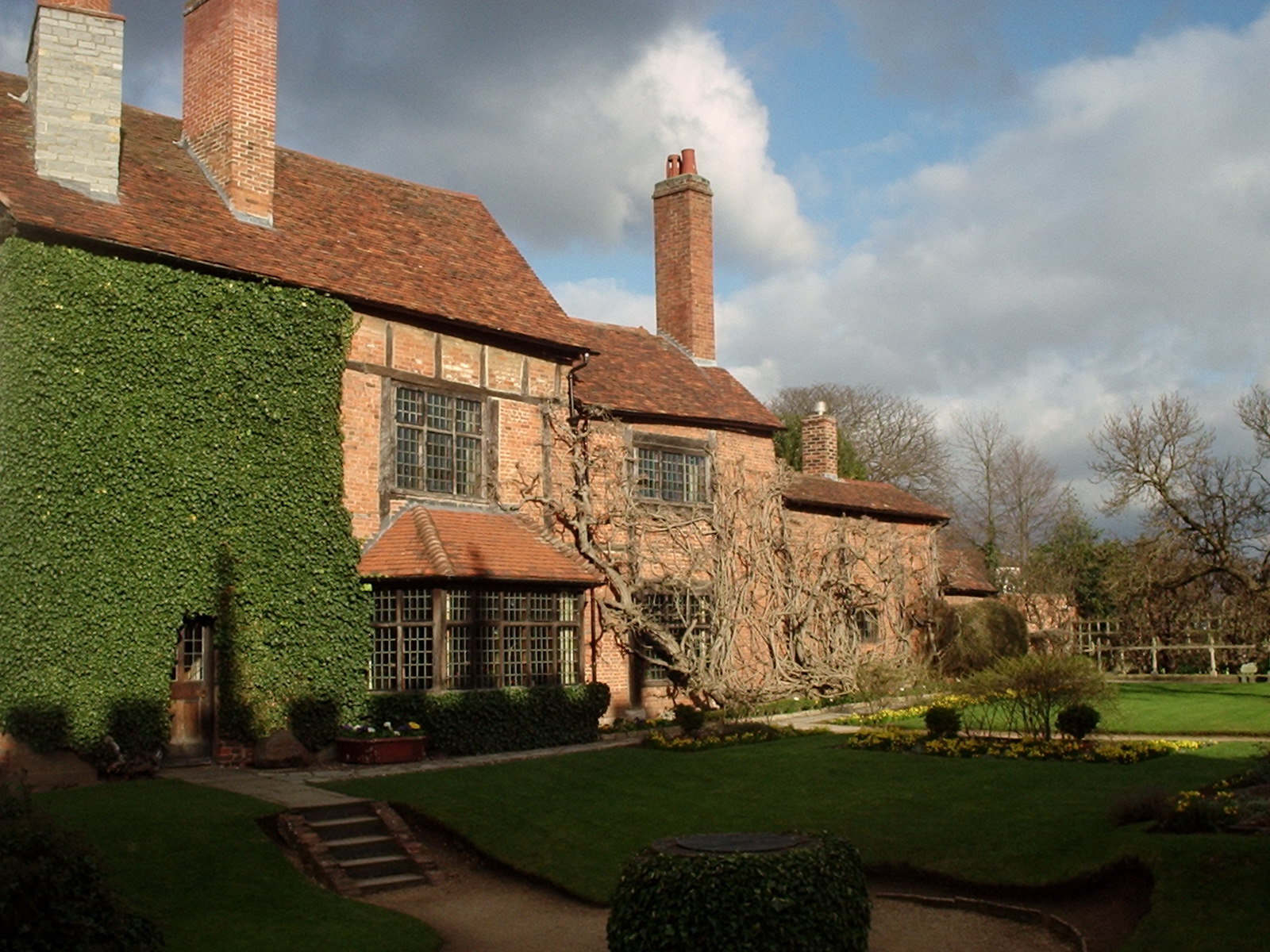
Nash's House, standing adjacent to the site of New Place

The inauspicious beginnings of Judith's marriage, in spite of her husband and his family being otherwise unexceptionable, has led to speculation that this was the cause for William Shakespeare's hastily altered last will and testament. He first summoned his lawyer, Francis Collins, in January 1616. On 25 March he made further alterations, probably because he was dying and because of his concerns about Quiney. In the first bequest of the will there had been a provision "vnto my sonne in L[aw]"; but "sonne in L[aw]" was then struck out, with Judith's name inserted in its stead. To this daughter he bequeathed £100 "in discharge of her marriage porcion"; another £50 if she were to relinquish the Chapel Lane cottage; and, if she or any of her children were still alive at the end of three years following the date of the will, a further £150, of which she was to receive the interest but not the principal. This money was explicitly denied to Thomas Quiney unless he were to bestow on Judith lands of equal value. In a separate bequest, Judith was given "my broad silver gilt bole".

Finally, for the bulk of his estate, which included his main house, "New Place", his two houses on Henley Street and various lands in and around Stratford, Shakespeare had set up an entail. His estate was bequeathed, in descending order of choice, to the following:

(1) his daughter, Susanna Hall;
(2) upon Susanna's death, "to the first sonne of her bodie lawfullie yssueing & to the heires Males of the bodie of the saied first Sonne lawfullie yssueing";
(3) to Susanna's second son and his male heirs;
(4) to Susanna's third son and his male heirs;
(5) to Susanna's "ffourth ... ffyfth sixte & Seaventh sonnes" and their male heirs;
(6) to Elizabeth, Susanna and John Hall's firstborn, and her male heirs;
(7) to Judith and her male heirs; or
(8) to whatever heirs the law would normally recognise.

This elaborate entail is usually taken to indicate that Thomas Quiney was not to be entrusted with Shakespeare's inheritance, although some have speculated that it may simply indicate that Susanna was the favoured child.

== Children ==
Judith and Thomas Quiney had three children: Shakespeare (baptised 23 November 1616 – buried 8 May 1617); Richard (baptised 9 February 1618 – buried 6 February 1639); and Thomas (baptised 23 January 1620 – buried 28 January 1639). Shakespeare was named for his mother's father. Richard's name was common among the Quineys: his other grandfather and an uncle were both named Richard.

Shakespeare Quiney died at six months of age. Richard and Thomas Quiney were buried within a month of each other; they were 21 and 19 years old, respectively. The deaths of all of Judith's children brought on new legal consequences. The entail on her father's inheritance led Susanna, along with her daughter and son-in-law, to make a settlement, by use of a rather elaborate legal device, for the inheritance of her own branch of the family. Legal wrangling continued for another thirteen years, until 1652.

== Death ==
Of Thomas Quiney's fate the records show little. It is speculated that he may have died in 1662 or 1663 when the parish burial records are incomplete. He certainly had a nephew in London, who by this time held the lease to The Cage.

== Bibliography ==
- Chambers, Edmund Kerchever (1930). William Shakespeare: A Study of Facts and Problems. Oxford: Clarendon Press. OCLC 353406.
- Chambers, Edmund Kerchever (1970). Sources for a Biography of Shakespeare. Oxford: Clarendon Press. OCLC 59179182.
- Halliwell-Phillipps, James Orchard (1882). Outlines of the life of Shakespeare. London: Longmans. OCLC 5190346.
- Schoenbaum, Samuel (1991). Shakespeare's Lives. Oxford: Oxford University Press. ISBN 0-19-818618-5.
- Schoenbaum, Samuel (1977). William Shakespeare: A Compact Documentary Life. Oxford: Clarendon Press. ISBN 0-19-505161-0.
