= Hercules Underhill =

- Born: 1581
- Died: 1658 (aged 76–77)
- Spouse(s): Bridget Carleton
- Father: William Underhill
- Mother: Mary Underhill

Sir Hercules Underhill (1581–1658) was the son of William Underhill of Warwickshire, owner of New Place in Stratford-Upon-Avon. William Underhill sold New Place to William Shakespeare in 1597, and Hercules Underhill confirmed the sale in 1602.

== Family ==
Hercules Underhill, born in 1581, was the second son of William Underhill (d.1597) and Mary Underhill (buried 10 November 1590), daughter of Thomas Underhill of Ettington, Warwickshire. He had five brothers and three sisters:

- Fulke Underhill (baptized 28 January 1578, d. 21 March 1599).
- Timothy Underhill (d.1658) of Idlicote.
- Ludowick (or Lewis) Underhill, citizen and haberdasher of London, living 1607.
- William Underhill (baptized 6 March 1588, d. 1656) of Ludlow, who married Hester Parker (1601–1641), daughter of Samuel Parker of Ludlow, mercer.
- Simon Underhill of Idlicote, (baptized 16 November 1589, d.1664), who married Elizabeth Hall (1585–1638), widow of Walter Savage (d.1622) of Broadway, and daughter of Richard Hall of Idlicote.
- Dorothy Underhill (baptized 18 May 1579).
- Elizabeth Underhill (baptized 10 November 1585, buried 25 November 1585).
- Valentine Underhill (baptized 17 February 1587), who married John Bolt.

Hercules Underhill's paternal grandparents were William Underhill (d. 31 March 1570) and Ursula Congreve (d. 13 May 1561), youngest daughter of John Congreve, esquire, of Stretton, Staffordshire; they had one son, William (1563-1597), and four daughters (Dorothy b.1551, Elizabeth b.1553, Anne 1557-1625, Margaret b.1559). After Ursula Congreve's death, William Underhill married Dorothy Hatton (1536-1569), widow of Richard Newport of Hunningham, Warwickshire, and sister of Sir Christopher Hatton, by whom he had no issue.

== Family history ==
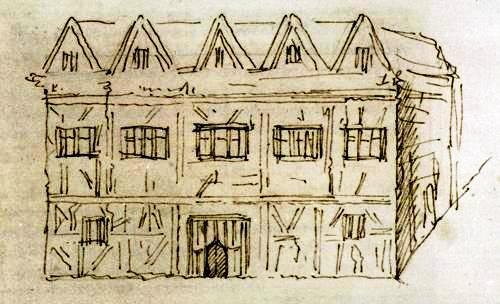
Sketch made in 1737 by George Vertue of New Place in Stratford upon Avon, sold to Shakespeare by Sir Hercules Underhill

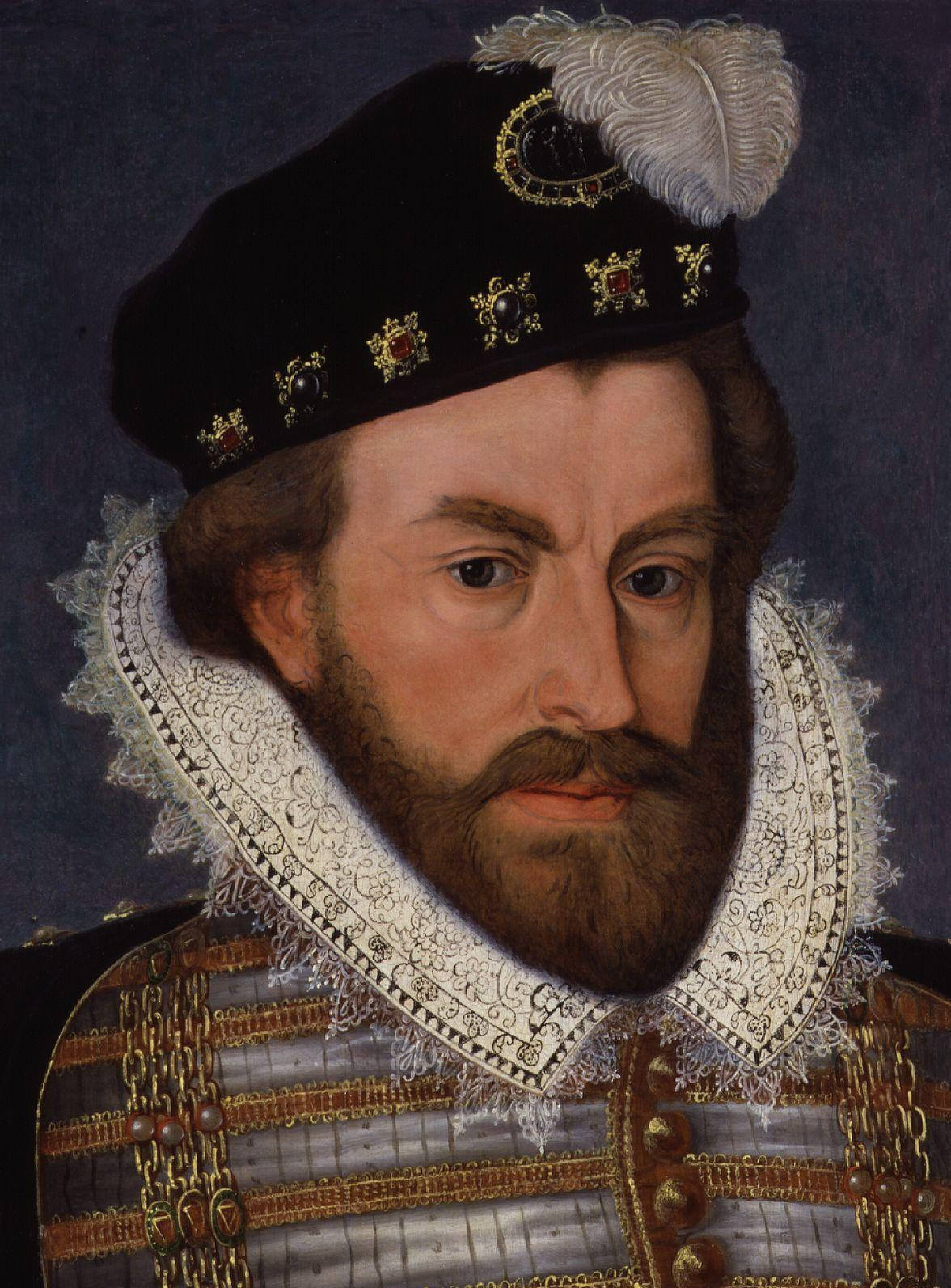
Sir Christopher Hatton, who purchased the wardship of Hercules Underhill's father

Hercules Underhill's paternal grandfather, William Underhill (c.1523 – 31 March 1570), was an Inner Temple lawyer and clerk of assizes at Warwick, and a substantial property holder in Warwickshire. Among his holdings was the manor of Idlicote, which he purchased from Lodovic Greville. He also held a 21-year lease on the manor of Newbold Revel from Thomas Throckmorton. In 1567 he purchased New Place in Stratford upon Avon from William Bott, agent of William Clopton, esquire. In addition to these properties he held the manors of Loxley and Barton-on-the-Heath, 'together with other houses and lands in Stratford, Hollington, Hardwick, Meriden, Haselor, Drayton and Easinghall'.

William Underhill died 31 March 1570, and was buried at Nether Ettington, where he and his first wife are commemorated by a marble monument. In his will he directed that his estates were not to be alienated by his heir save in circumstances of 'pressing need'. His three daughters were given marriage portions of five hundred pounds and a silver spoon apiece. His second daughter was given the wedding ring which had belonged to her stepmother, Dorothy Hatton, and his youngest daughter was given one of her mother Ursula Congreve's rings.

William Underhill (d.1597), his only son and heir, was sixteen years of age at his father's death in 1570, and became a ward of the crown. His wardship was purchased in 1571 by his stepmother Dorothy's Hatton's brother, Sir Christopher Hatton.

When he came of age in about 1575, William Underhill inherited his father's estates. Shortly thereafter he obtained licence to sell the manor of Loxley to Thomas Underhill, one of his cousins, and about that time married Mary Underhill (d.1590), another cousin. In 1579 he was imprisoned for recusancy, 'but being able to give an explanation to Burghley, was soon released'. In 1581, by reason of pressing financial circumstances, he was granted licence to alienate lands in Hollington and Meriden. In 1587 he was appointed escheator for Warwickshire and Leicestershire. In 1590 his wife, Mary, died. She was buried at Idlicote, and after her death he settled his estates in trust on his eldest son and heir, Fulke Underhill.

== Real estate proceedings with Shakespeare ==
In Easter term 1597 William Underhill sold New Place to William Shakespeare for £60 by final concord dated 4 May (see Shakespeare Birthplace Trust MS, Item 1, Case 8). At the time of the sale the property consisted of one messuage, two barns and two gardens with their appurtenances.

In July 1597 he was poisoned at Fillongley near Coventry, and on 6 July made a nuncupative will (spoken rather than written) naming as executors George Shirley and Thomas Shirley of Staunton Harold, Leicestershire. He left all his lands to his eldest son, Fulke Underhill, £200 apiece to each of his younger sons, and £500 apiece to his daughters Dorothy and Valentine. He died on 7 July, and was buried with his wife at Idlicote.

According to Charlotte Stopes, Fulke Underhill died without issue in May 1598, while still under age, leaving his brother Hercules as his heir, and was not at first suspected of having poisoned his father; however "either through his own confession or the evidence of others, his guilt afterwards became known", and in 1602 the Court of Exchequer appointed a commission to "obtain an account of the possessions of Fulke Underhill of Fillongley, county Warwick, felon, who had taken the life of his father, William Underhill, by poison". According to Schoenbaum, however, he was hanged at Warwick in 1599 for poisoning his father, and attainted for felony, whereby his estates escheated to the crown, which regranted them to Hercules Underhill when he came of age in 1602. In Michaelmas term 1602, Hercules Underhill confirmed the sale of New Place to William Shakespeare by final concord; in order to obtain clear title, Shakespeare paid a fee equal to one quarter of the yearly value of the property, "the peculiar circumstances of the case causing some doubt on the validity of the original purchase".

== Career ==
Underhill was knighted by James I at Compton Wynyates, Warwickshire, on 6 September 1617, and was appointed High Sheriff of Warwickshire in 1625. During the English Civil War he was a Royalist, and having been accused of being a 'Popish recusant', was forced to compound his estates for the sum of £1177.

He died at Idlicote, Warwickshire, in 1658. As he left no surviving issue, his heir was his nephew, William Underhill, who was later knighted and married Alice Lucy, daughter of Sir Thomas Lucy.

The arms borne by Sir Hercules Underhill were Argent a chevron between three trefoils flipped, vert, three bezants.

== Marriage ==
He married Bridget Carleton, sister of Dudley Carleton, 1st Viscount Dorchester, and daughter of Anthony Carleton by his second wife, Joyce Goodwin. There are said to have been no surviving issue of the marriage.
