= All is True =

All is True can refer to:

- An alternative name for William Shakespeare's play Henry VIII
- All Is True, a 2018 Kenneth Branagh film
