= Susanna Hall =

Eldest child of William Shakespeare and Anne Hathaway (1583–1649)

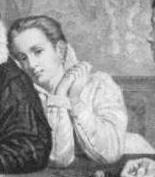
- Born: Susanna Shakespeare c. 24 May 1583; England
- Died: 11 July 1649 (aged 66); England
- Spouse: John Hall (m. 1607; died 1635)
- Children: Elizabeth Bernard
- Parent(s): William Shakespeare; Anne Hathaway

Susanna Hall (née Shakespeare; bapt. 26 May 1583 – 11 July 1649) was the oldest child of William Shakespeare and Anne Hathaway and the older sister of twins Judith and Hamnet Shakespeare. Susanna married John Hall, a local physician, in 1607. They had one daughter, Elizabeth, in 1608. Elizabeth married Thomas Nash, son of Anthony Nash on 22 April 1626 at Holy Trinity Church, Stratford-upon-Avon.

== Birth and early life ==
Susanna was baptised in the Church of the Holy Trinity, Stratford-upon-Avon on Trinity Sunday (a church feast day), 26 May 1583.

Shakespeare's wife Anne was already pregnant with Susanna when the couple were married. The name "Susanna" derives from the apocryphal story of Susanna and the elders in the Book of Daniel and suggests "purity and spotlessness", and had associations that appealed to the Puritans. It first appeared in Stratford parish registers in 1574, so the name was still rather novel, but it was shared by two other children born that spring. As such it may have been an assertion of virtue for a child born "perilously close to the wrong side of marriage" as the historian Peter Ackroyd put it.

She was raised in Stratford-upon-Avon along with her younger siblings, twins Hamnet and Judith. Stratford school records of the time do not exist, and since girls were not allowed at the Stratford King Edward VI School, any education she would have received would have been arranged by her family through tutors. Her signature exists in two separate documents, demonstrating that she was able to sign her name.

== Marriage to John Hall ==
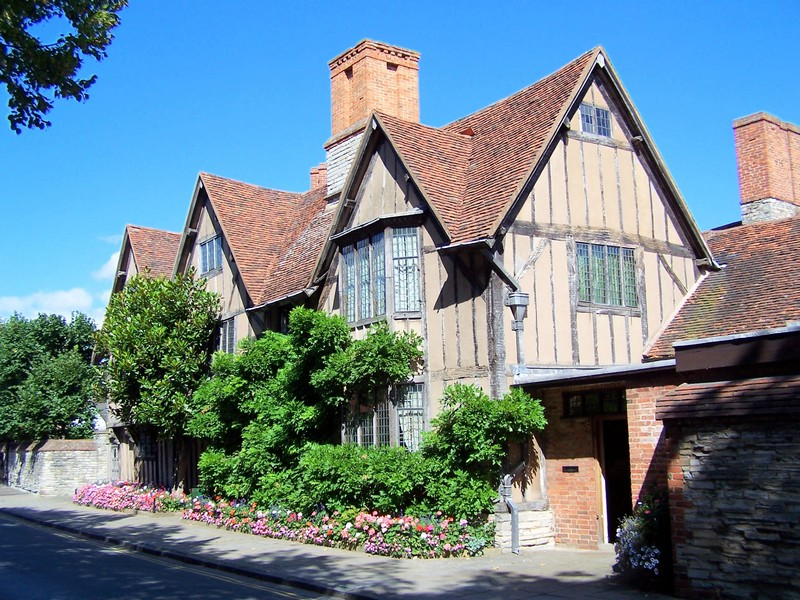
John and Susanna Hall lived at Hall's Croft in Stratford until 1616.

Susanna married John Hall, a respected physician, on 5 June 1607 in Holy Trinity Church. She was 24; he was about 32. Some slight evidence indicates that Shakespeare settled a substantial dowry on Susanna of 105 acres of his land in Old Stratford he had bought in 1602, probably retaining a life interest in it. John Hall's Select Observations, case studies of his patients, was published in 1657, 22 years after his death. The earliest case, a local one, dates from 1611, making it almost certain that he lived and worked in Stratford from at least the time of his marriage.

Their one child, Elizabeth, was baptised on 21 February 1608 in Holy Trinity Church. The couple had no other children, and Elizabeth was the only grandchild Shakespeare knew, as Judith's children with Thomas Quiney were born after his death.

== Suit for slander ==
In June 1613, a man named John Lane, Jr., 23, accused Susanna of adultery with Rafe Smith, a 35-year-old haberdasher, and claimed she had caught a venereal disease from Smith. As a notable Puritan of the community, Hall supported the Puritan vicar, Thomas Wilson, against whom Lane would later participate in a riot, and it is possible that Lane's charges had political motives in defaming Susanna.

On 15 July the Halls brought suit for slander against Lane in the Consistory court at Worcester. Robert Whatcott, who three years later witnessed Shakespeare's will, testified for the Halls, but Lane failed to appear. Lane was found guilty of slander and excommunicated. In 1619 Lane was found guilty of slander again, this time for attacks on the vicar and local aldermen. He was also named in court as a persistent drunkard.

== Inheritance ==
When Shakespeare died on 23 April 1616, he left the bulk of his estate, in an elaborate fee tail, to Susanna and her male heirs, which included his main house, New Place, his two houses on Henley Street, and various lands in and around Stratford, and all his "goodes Chattels, Leases, plate, jewles and Household stuffe whatsoever after my dettes and Legasies paied and my funerall expences discharged" to her and her husband.

In the case of Susanna's death, the estate was bequeathed, in descending order of choice, "to the first sonne of her bodie lawfullie yssueing & to the heires Males of the bodie of the saied first Sonne lawfullie yssueing"; and in default of such issue, to her second son and his male heirs and to the third, fourth, fifth, sixth and seventh sons and their male heirs. In case no sons were born or they died, the estate would then go to her daughter Elizabeth Hall and her male heirs; to Judith and her male heirs; or to whatever lawful heirs survived.

He also named the Halls as executors of the will, and John Hall proved the will in London 22 June 1616 at the archbishop's prerogative court at Canterbury.

In 1626, Susanna's daughter Elizabeth Hall married Thomas Nash. The Nashes lived with Susanna in New Place, the second biggest house in Stratford for at least a proportion of their marriage. Thomas made his will on 25 August 1642, in which he left his house in Chapel Street and two meadows to Elizabeth but the bulk of his estate to his cousin, Edward Nash, including New Place. However, as he was not the owner, but the owner's son in law, he did not have the right to dispose of the property. On 4 April 1647, Thomas Nash died. Susanna and Elizabeth obtained a deed of settlement to confirm that they were still the legal holders of the estates Susanna had inherited from Shakespeare and which were entailed to Elizabeth. Edward Nash took Elizabeth Nash to chancery court the following year, demanding that she honour the terms of her late husband's will. His legal bid was not successful.

== Death and burial ==
Susanna died aged 66 years, a few weeks after Elizabeth married for the second time, to John Bernard (MP for Northampton).

Susanna was buried in Holy Trinity Church in Stratford next to her parents. Her tombstone epitaph reads:

Here lyeth the body of Susanna, wife of John Hall, gent., the daughter of William Shakespeare, gent. She deceased the 11 day of July, Anno 1649, aged 66.

Witty above her sex, but that's not all,
Wise to Salvation was good Mistress Hall,
Something of Shakespeare was in that, but this
Wholly of him with whom she's now in blisse.
Then, passenger, hast nere a tear
To weep with her that wept with all
That wept, yet set herself to chere
Them up with comforts cordiall?
Her love shall live, her mercy spread
When thou hast nere a tear to shed.

== Fictional portrayals ==
- Peter Whelan's 1996 play The Herbal Bed is a fictionalization of the events surrounding Hall's slander suit.
- Susanna is the main character of author Michael J. Ortiz's 2006 novel Swan Town: The Secret Journal of Susanna Shakespeare.
- In the 2016 sitcom Upstart Crow, Susanna is played by Helen Monks.
- In the 2017 drama Will, Susanna is played by Phoebe Austen.
- In the 2019 film All Is True, Susanna is played by Lydia Wilson.
- In the 2025 film Hamnet, Susanna is played by Bodhi Rae Breathnach.
