= Anthony Carleton =

English politician (c.1522–1576)

- Born: c. 1522
- Died: 18 January 1576 (aged 53–54)
- Buried: Brightwell Baldwin, Oxfordshire
- Spouses: Anne Peryent; Joyce Goodwin
- Issue: John Carleton; George Carleton; Dudley Carleton, 1st Viscount Dorchester; Elizabeth Carleton; Joyce Carleton; Elizabeth Carleton; Bridget Carleton; Alice Carleton; Anne Carleton
- Father: John Carleton
- Mother: Joyce Welbeck

Anthony Carleton (c.1522 – 18 January 1576) was a landowner and Member of Parliament, and the father of Dudley Carleton, 1st Viscount Dorchester.

== Family ==
Anthony Carleton, born about 1522, was the eldest son of John Carleton of Walton-on-Thames, Surrey, and Brightwell Baldwin, Oxfordshire, and Joyce Welbeck, the daughter of John Welbeck of Oxon Hoath, Kent. His maternal grandmother, Margaret Culpeper, was the aunt of Henry VIII's fifth wife, Katherine Howard.

The inscription on his father's monument states that he had four brothers: George Carleton; William (said to have been a priest); John (who died unmarried at Bologna); and Edward, and four sisters: Anne, who married Rowland Lytton; Katherine, who married Francis Blount, younger brother of James Blount, 6th Baron Mountjoy; Mabel, who married John Fetch of Haddenham, Buckinghamshire; and Jane, who married Erasmus Gainsford, son of Sir John Gainsford (d.1540) of Crowhurst, Surrey.

== Career ==
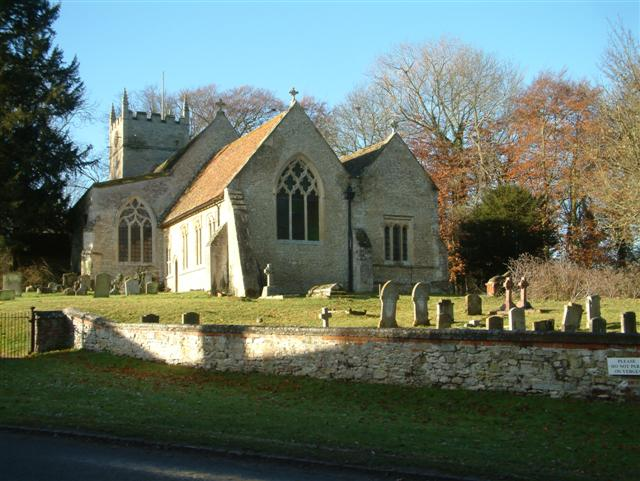
Church of St Bartholomew at Brightwell Baldwin, where Anthony Carleton was buried

He succeeded his father in 1551. At the beginning of the reign of Elizabeth I, he is said to have held a minor position in the royal household.

He was elected Member of Parliament for Westbury in 1559, likely through his family connection to the Blounts. However he was primarily a local official. By 1559 he was a Justice of the Peace for Oxfordshire and escheator for Berkshire and Oxfordshire. From September 1559 to February 1565 he was receiver-general for Bedfordshire and Buckinghamshire, and also later served as a commissioner for sewers in Buckinghamshire, and commissioner of musters in Oxfordshire.

It has been conjectured from the language of his will that he shared the Puritan sympathies of his brother, George.

He made his last will on 18 December 1575, and died 18 January 1576. The will was proved the following June. In it he appointed his widow, Joyce, as his sole executrix, with Thomas Wilson and Edward Denton as overseers. He left legacies of £20 to the poor and marriage portions of £200 apiece to his four younger daughters. The Queen later intervened in the administration of Carleton's estate on behalf of his 'poor widow' in connection with some land in Brightwell Baldwin. Joyce Carleton was still living in 1606, when she was mentioned in a letter from John Chamberlain to Sir Dudley Carleton.

He was buried in the parish church of St Bartholomew at Brightwell Baldwin, where a monument to him and to his first wife, Anne, names his son, John, and daughter, Joyce, by his first marriage.

== Marriages and issue ==
He married firstly Anne Peryent (d. 3 April 1562), daughter and coheir of Thomas Peryent of Digswell, Hertfordshire, by whom he had a son and two daughters:

- John Carleton, who died without issue.
- Elizabeth Carleton, who married Anthony Berners of Thoby, Essex.
- Joyce Carleton, who according to one source married a husband surnamed Plumsted; however according to McClure she married Edward Denton.

He married secondly Joyce Goodwin, widow of Robert Saunders of Flore, Northamptonshire, and daughter of Sir John Goodwin of Winchendon, Buckinghamshire, by whom he had two sons and four daughters:

- George Carleton of Huntercombe, Oxfordshire, eldest son and heir, who married firstly Elizabeth Brockett, daughter and heir to Sir John Brocket, and secondly Katherine Harrison (d. October 1619), widow of Thomas Spyer of Huntercombe, and daughter of Thomas Harrison (d. 25 February 1603) of East Court by his second wife, Katherine Chamberlaine.
- Dudley Carleton, 1st Viscount Dorchester.
- Elizabeth Carleton, who married Alexander Williams and resided at Cripplegate.
- Bridget Carleton, who married Hercules Underhill of Idlicote, Warwickshire. Underhill sold New Place in Stratford-upon-Avon to William Shakespeare.
- Alice Carleton, who was a close friend of John Chamberlain, who left her substantial bequests in his will, and may have intended to marry her. She accompanied her brother, Sir Dudley Carleton, to Venice while he was ambassador there.
- Anne Carleton (d. October 1606), who married John Dove, Doctor of Divinity, rector of St Mary Aldermanbury.
