= Felix Ladbroke =

English banker and cricketer

Felix Calvert Ladbroke (1771 - 14 March 1840) was an English banker and amateur cricketer.

== Biography ==
He was born in Idlicote, near Shipton-on-Stour, Warwickshire, the second son of Robert Ladbroke, banker and Member of Parliament for Warwick. His father later sold Idlicote and purchased estates in Surrey. Felix inherited 10,000 pounds on his father's death in 1814 and land, mainly in Surrey, from his cousin James Weller Ladbroke,

Following his father, he was a partner in the banking firm of Ladbroke, Kingscote and Co. and also had insurance and brewing interests. In 1829 he was appointed High Sheriff of Surrey.

== Cricketing career ==
As a cricketer he was mainly associated with Marylebone Cricket Club (MCC). As an English amateur cricketer he made 29 known appearances in important matches from 1804 to 1826.

In 1815, Ladbroke scored one of the earliest known centuries at the new Lord's Cricket Ground in the Middlesex v Epsom match on 24 & 25 August when he and Frederick Woodbridge made 116 and 107 respectively for Epsom.
