= Nash's House =

House of Shakespeare's son-in-law in Stratford-upon-Avon

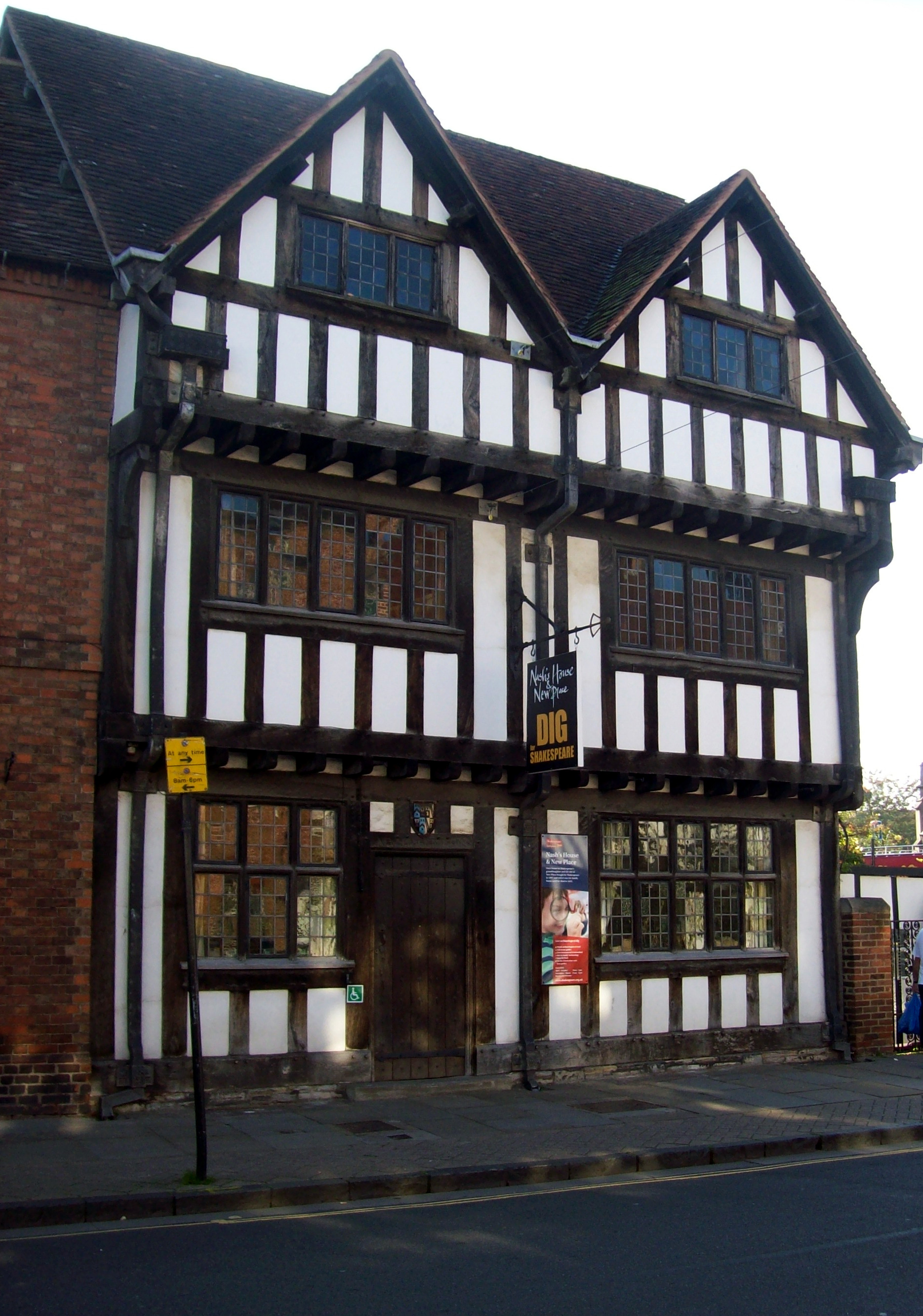
- The front of Nash's House
- Interactive map of Nash's House
- Location: 22 Chapel Street, Stratford-upon-Avon, Warwickshire, England
- Coordinates: 52.1908°N 1.7073°W
- Built: c. 1600
- Owner: Shakespeare Birthplace Trust
- Website: www.shakespeare.org.uk

Listed Building – Grade I
- Official name: Nash's House (New Place Museum)
- Designated: 25 October 1951
- Reference no.: 1204376

Nash's House in Chapel Street, Stratford-upon-Avon, Warwickshire, England, is the house next door to the ruins and gardens of William Shakespeare's final residence, New Place.

== History ==
It is a grade I listed building and has been converted into a historic house museum.

The house was built around 1600. By 1642, it had passed to Thomas Nash, Shakespeare's son-in-law. Its frontage was rebuilt in 1912, replacing 19th-century alterations which had led to the demolition of the original front wall. The Shakespeare Birthplace Trust acquired New Place and Nash's House in 1876. The museum traces the history of Stratford-upon-Avon from the earliest settlers in the Avon Valley to Shakespeare's time.
