= The Herbal Bed =

1996 play written by Peter Whelan

- Poster for the 1998 US production
- Original language: English
- Written by: Peter Whelan
- Subject: Shakespeare's daughter is accused of adultery
- Genre: Period piece
- Setting: 1613, Stratford-upon-Avon, England

Premiere
- Date: 1996
- Place: The Other Place; Stratford-upon-Avon

The Herbal Bed (1996) is a play by Peter Whelan, written specifically for the Royal Shakespeare Company. The play is set in the year 1613 and is about Susanna Hall, daughter of William Shakespeare, who is accused of adultery with local haberdasher Rafe Smith. Her husband, Dr John Hall, is suspicious of their relationship, but stands up for his wife when she takes her accuser to court for slander. Though Susanna's father is regularly mentioned, his name is never specified and he never appears. The play ends as he is about to enter.

In the original 1996 production at The Other Place theatre, the leading role of John Hall was played by Liam Cunningham. Susanna was played by Teresa Banham. The accuser Jack Lane was played by David Tennant and Smith by Joseph Fiennes. The production was directed by Michael Attenborough.

During 1997 the play had a successful run at the Duchess Theatre in London's West End. John Hall was played by Lorcan Cranitch. In 1998, a NYC production played at the Eugene O'Neill Theater with an all-American cast, including Armand Schultz (Rafe), Tuck Milligan (John), and Laila Robins (Susanna). The NYC production was also directed by Michael Attenborough.

== Characters ==
- John Hall, a doctor
- Susanna Hall, his wife
- Hester Fletcher, a servant of the Halls
- Rafe Smith, a haberdasher
- Jack Lane, a young gentleman studying medicine with Dr Hall
- Henry Parry, Bishop of Worcester
- Barnabus Goche, Vicar-General
- Elizabeth Hall, daughter of John and Susanna

== Plot ==
=== Act I ===
Scene one: In the herbal garden outside the Halls's residence, raffish medical student Jack Lane and pious haberdasher Rafe Smith discuss the visit of the local bishop. As the bishop and his entourage emerge Susanna gives him a herbal tonic. Smith dislikes having to bow to the bishop, but does so out of politeness. John explains the medical use of herbs to the bishop. After the bishop leaves, John tells Jack that he has had a complaint of possible sexual misconduct against him. Jack shrugs it off. John says he must leave for the night to attend an important patient, Lady Haines. Hester talks to Rafe, who she obviously adores. Rafe discusses his troubled marriage. Susanna buys ribbons for Elizabeth from Rafe, who offers them free of charge. It is clear that Rafe and Susanna are attracted to each other. Rafe says that since her husband will be away she should join him and his wife for dinner at his friend John Palmer's house. He leaves.

Scene two: Later that evening Susanna learns that her father is ill. She prepares some herbal medicine for him. Jack attempts to seduce Hester, but is spotted by Susanna. When John is informed, he tells Jack that he must leave. Jack is horrified, as his father will cut off his allowance if he is not training for a profession. John leaves for the night.

Scene three: At night Rafe reappears. He confesses that there was no dinner at his friend Palmer's house. In fact Palmer is away. Rafe had hoped to take Susanna there so they could be alone together, but his respect for her husband and sincere feelings for Susanna stopped him. Susanna is shocked, but confesses her love for Rafe. The two kiss and disappear into the bushes of the herbal garden. Hester reappears and spots Rafe, who quickly departs. Susanna tells her that they have just come back from the dinner. Jack also appears, having been with Hester. Susanna says she is making a medical preparation for herself, but when Jack sees the medicine she has made he recognises it as a treatment for gonorrhea.

=== Act II ===
Scene one. Two days later, in the garden. Susanna is playing with Elizabeth as John tells her about his visit to Lady Haines. A letter arrives. John reads it and is disturbed by its contents. It is from an acquaintance, who tells him that Jack was mouthing off in the local inn that Susanna has gonorrhea and that she has passed it on to Rafe after meeting him at the empty Palmer residence. John is outraged, but assumes that the story is intended as revenge on him for dismissing Jack. He leaves. Susanna asks Hester to lie about what really happened. She agrees. Jack appears, contrite, insisting that he will withdraw everything he said. John wants a written retraction posted in the church, but Jack is worried about what his father will say. Susanna, afraid that her tryst with Rafe will be discovered, tries to resolve matters. Rafe appears, furious, and berates Jack. Jack feels insulted that a mere tradesman is looking down on him, and draws his sword, but Rafe easily disarms him. Humiliated, Jack now refuses to retract, insisting that he spoke the truth. Jack leaves. John is now suspicious that he is not being told the full truth. Though Hester loyally supports her mistress's version of events, Rafe can barely be held back from confessing. John leaves to look up the legal issues. Susanna tries to convince Rafe that their love is not immoral, since they did not actually have sex. She invokes Rafe's admiration of John, pointing out that the truth would humiliate him and probably destroy his practice. Rafe reluctantly agrees to keep silent about what really happened. John returns, having concluded that Jack should be sued for slander in the ecclesiastical courts. He suggests that a letter to Jack's father might smooth matters over. If Jack agrees to confess to slander John will help him find another medical tutor. After a tense discussion, Susanna, John and Rafe agree to support one another.

Scene two: At the ecclesiastical court John, Rafe, Susanna and Hester wait to testify. John receives a letter from Jack's father saying that his son will plead guilty. The bishop and his puritanical assistant Barnabus Goche appear. They say that Jack has failed to appear, claiming to be ill, even though they have evidence otherwise. He has therefore lost the case and will be excommunicated. The bishop says John, Rafe and Susanna can leave without a stain on their character. Hester is sent to prepare for their going, but when the bishop leaves Goche detains them. He interrogates them, looking for inconsistencies in their story. Matters remain tense. Goche thinks he has found an inconsistency in one detail and recalls Hester, who has been forcibly detained. Hester is indignant. She comes up with a convincing lie. Goche leaves and Hester falls to her knees saying that God told her to lie.

Scene three: Back in the herbal garden John and Susanna are awaiting the arrival of Susanna's sick father. Rafe arrives and says he intends to leave Stratford. They try to persuade him to stay. Jack, now a chronic drunk, also appears and offers to help. Susanna allows him to stay, despite the distaste of Rafe and Hester. John speaks of his impotence as a doctor, believing that his inability to help Susanna's father is divine punishment. He tells Susanna that he now understands that she believed her father to be suffering from gonorrhea, and that the treatment she was preparing was intended for him. But her father's disease is more serious than that, and John has no cure. News arrives that Susanna's father needs to be carried into the garden in a special chair. Susanna reflects that her father was unfaithful to her mother, but everyone felt 'warm' when he was in the house. Rafe, Jack and Hester all help to carry him into the garden.

== Historical context ==
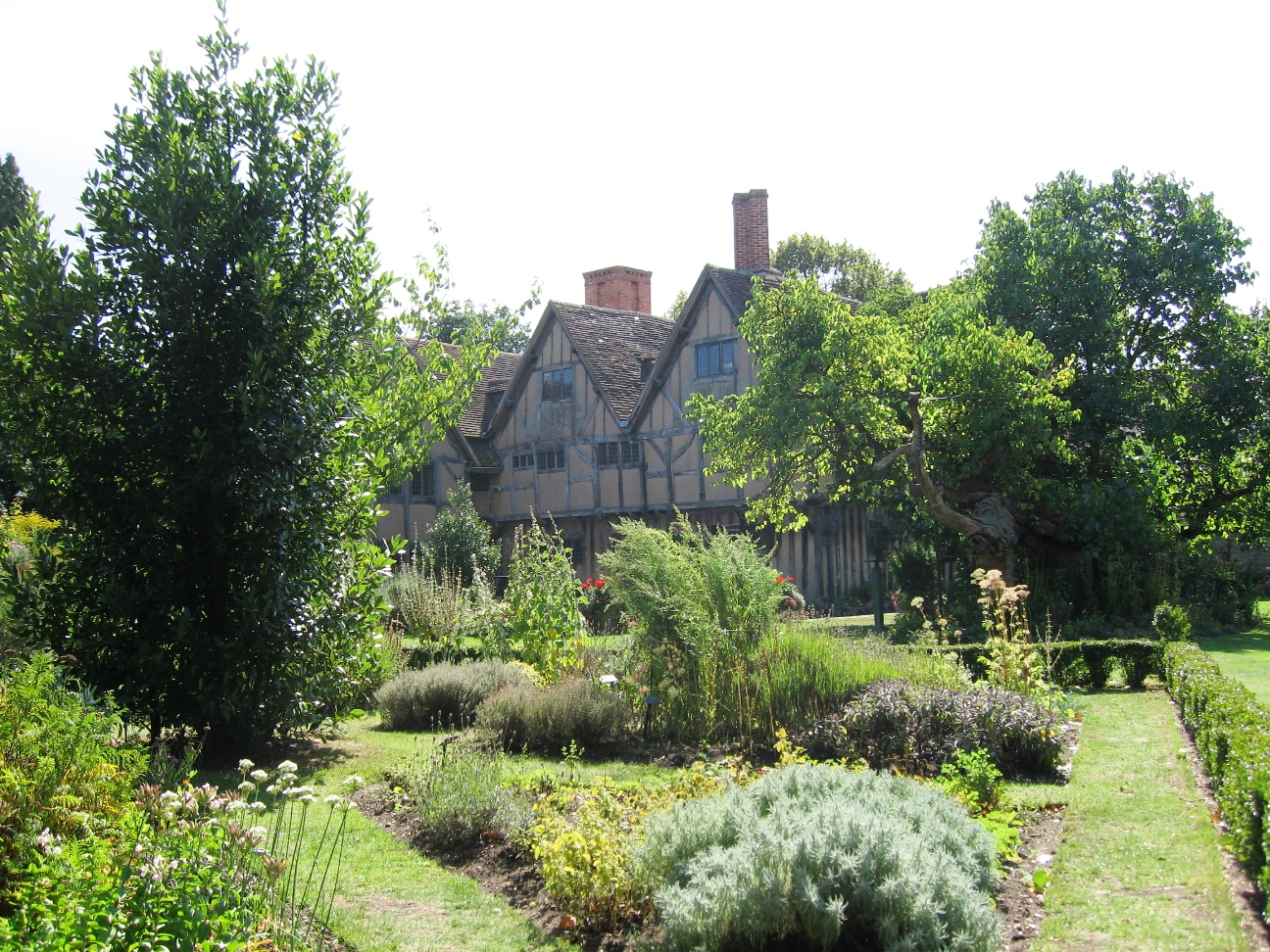
John and Susanna Hall's home Hall's Croft, in the garden of which most of the play is set.

The play derives from a real court case. In June 1613, a man named John Lane (1590–1640), aged 23, accused Susanna of adultery with a Rafe Smith at the house of John Palmer. He claimed she had caught "the running of the raynes [kidneys]", a term used for gonorrhea, from Smith. Smith was a 35-year-old haberdasher, and the nephew of Shakespeare's close friend Hamnet Sadler. On 15 July the Halls brought suit for slander against Lane in the Consistory Court at Worcester. Robert Whatcott, who three years later witnessed Shakespeare's will, testified for the Halls, but Lane failed to appear. Lane was found guilty and excommunicated.

Lane may have had a grudge against Hall. His later activities indicate that he may have been an opponent of the Puritan cause in Stratford. Hall was a notable Puritan and supporter of the local vicar, Thomas Wilson, against whom Lane would later provoke a riot. It is thus possible that Lane had political motives in defaming Susanna. However, he was regularly in trouble with the law. In 1619 he was tried for the rioting and for libelling the vicar and local aldermen. He was also accused in Stratford Church court of being an alcoholic.

In the play the principal witness Robert Whatcott does not appear in the court scene, but is named as the author of the letter to Hall outlining Lane's slanders. Lane was a member of a local gentry family, but was not studying medicine with Hall. The suggestion in the play that Shakespeare himself may be suffering from a venereal disease in his last years has been made by some biographers. Katherine Duncan-Jones argues that he suffered from syphilis. However, there is no evidence that he was seriously ill in 1613. Indeed, in November 1614 Shakespeare was in London on business for several weeks with Hall.
