= Idlicote =

Coordinates: 52.0952°N 1.5888°W

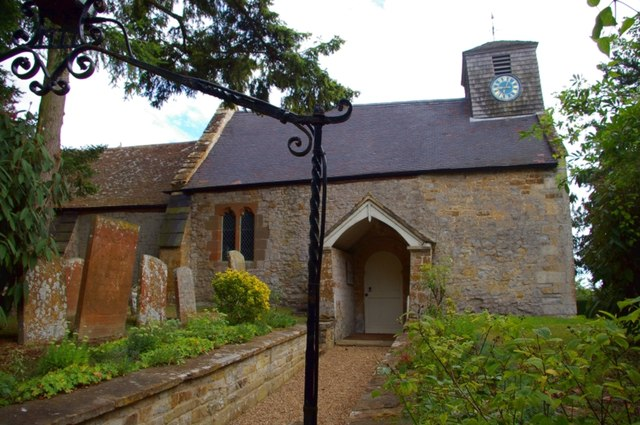
- St James the Great parish church

- Location within Warwickshire
- District: Stratford-on-Avon
- Shire county: Warwickshire
- Region: West Midlands
- Country: England
- Sovereign state: United Kingdom
- Post town: Shipston-on-Stour
- Postcode district: CV36
- Dialling code: 01608
- Police: Warwickshire
- Fire: Warwickshire
- Ambulance: West Midlands

Idlicote is a small settlement and civil parish in the English county of Warwickshire, about 3 miles (5 km) north-east of Shipston-on-Stour and 8 miles (13 km) south-east of Stratford-upon-Avon. Population details can be found under Honington. The best known feature is Idlicote House, a grade II listed country house, on a site once owned by St Mary's Abbey. The most notable building is the parish church of Saint James the Great, which has surviving features from the 13th and 14th centuries and a 17th-century chapel added to house tombs of members of the Underhill family of Idlicote.

Apart from these two, there are several other listed buildings, including Badger's Cottage and Badger's Farm, the Old Rectory, the Whitehouse and Nineveh farmhouses, and the dovecote at Idlicote House. The parish is considered too small for a parish council and instead has a parish meeting. It also forms part of the Brailes ward of the Stratford-on-Avon District. In 1868 The National Gazetteer of Great Britain and Ireland said of Idlicote:

"IDLICOTE, a parish in the Brailes division of the hundred of Kington, county Warwick, 3 miles N. E. of Shipston-on-Stour, its post town. The parish, which is small, is wholly agricultural. It is a meet for the Warwick hounds. There is no village, only a few farmhouses. Stone is quarried. The living is a rectory, in the diocese of Worcester, value £80. The church is dedicated to St. James. The parochial charities produce about £5 per annum. Idlicote House, the principal residence, is the seat of Captain H. K. P. Peach. It formerly belonged to the monks of Kenilworth, and after passing through several hands, was finally purchased by the present owner, who is lord of the manor and sole landowner."

== Notable people ==
- Fulke Underhill (1578–1598), of Idlicote House
- Sir Hercules Underhill (1581–1650), of Idlicote House
- Sir Robert Ladbroke (1713–1773), of Idlicote House
- Felix Ladbroke (1771–1840), a banker and cricketer, was born here
- Geoffrey Howe, Lord Howe, Conservative politician, Chancellor, Foreign Secretary, Peer
- Elspeth Howe, Baroness Howe of Idlicote, life peer, the Old Rectory, Idlicote, widow of Geoffrey.
