= John Bernard (MP for Northampton) =

English landowner and Member of Parliament

Sir John Bernard (23 August 1604 – 5 March 1674) of Abington Park, Northamptonshire was an English landowner and briefly a Member of Parliament.

Abington Park, c.1910

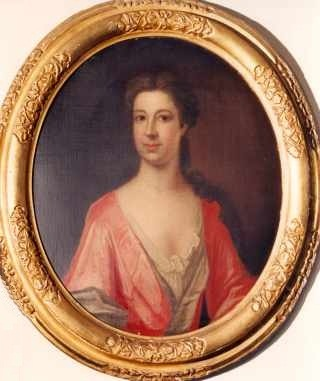
Elizabeth Bernard, granddaughter of William Shakespeare

== Biography ==
The eldest son of Baldwin Bernard of Abington, Northamptonshire, via his second wife, Eleanor, daughter of John Fulwood, of Forde Hall, Warwickshire. He succeeded his father to the Abington estate in 1610.

He was knighted on 24 September 1661, and on 31 March 1664 he was elected Member of Parliament for Northampton, but was unseated on 26 April in favour of Sir Henry Yelverton.

In 1669 he sold Abington Park, having previously extended it, to William Thursby, a future MP for Northampton. He died in 1674.

He had married firstly Elizabeth, daughter of Sir Clement Edmondes; they had four sons, who all predeceased him, and four daughters. His second wife, Elizabeth, was daughter of John and Susanna Hall and granddaughter (and only surviving descendant) of William Shakespeare. They had no children.
