= John Hall (physician) =

16th/17th-century English physician and son-in-law of William Shakespeare

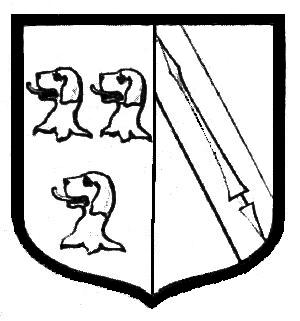
- Coat of arms of John Hall (left) impaled with the coat of arms of Shakespeare (right)
- Born: 1575; Carlton, Bedfordshire, England
- Died: 25 November 1635 (aged 59–60)
- Spouse: Susanna Hall (m. 1607)

John Hall (1575 – 25 November 1635) was an English physician who was a son-in-law of William Shakespeare as the husband of Susanna Hall (née Shakespeare).

== Life ==
He was probably born in Carlton, Bedfordshire, about 1575, although his baptism is not recorded there as there is a hiatus in the Carlton registers at this time. His father was William Hall, formerly of Carlton and latterly of Acton, Middlesex. A covenant to levy a fine at Steventon, now Stevington, Bedfordshire, in 1570 details more of the Hall's ancestry. William Hall of Carlton, gentleman, the son of Christopher Hall ‘late of Edgeworth in y^{e} Countye of Midd gentlyman deceassed’, transfers to Edward Wilkinson of Stevington, yeoman, a messuage called Aluff’s in Stevington as well as other property and land there and at Bromham and Stagsden, all ‘late of John Hall deceassed grandfather unto y^{e} sayd Wyllyam in Stevynton’. Furthermore, this document also tells us that William Hall’s ‘nowe wyffe’ was called ‘Julyan’,

He studied at Queens' College, Cambridge from 1589, receiving a B.A. in 1593 and an M.A. in 1597. He became a physician, although he did not hold an English medical degree; it has been speculated that he studied medicine in France.

He established a practice in Stratford-upon-Avon, where he was the only doctor in the town. He married Shakespeare's daughter Susanna on 5 June 1607. They had one daughter, Elizabeth. Their home in Stratford, Hall's Croft, is now open to the public. After Shakespeare's death, they moved into his former house at New Place.

Hall appears to have had a close relationship with his father-in-law, as they are recorded as being in agreement over a local issue regarding enclosure in 1613. They are also known to have travelled together to London on business in 1614.

Hall is believed to have written the Latin epitaph upon his mother-in-law Anne Shakespeare's grave slab in the Church of the Holy Trinity, Stratford-upon-Avon on behalf of his wife, although it has alternatively been suggested that Susanna and Judith, his respective wife and sister-in-law, were its writers.

== Defamation case ==
Hall was a leading local Puritan. He had supported the Puritan vicar, Thomas Wilson, against whom there was much local opposition. In 1613, a member of the anti-Wilson faction, John Lane, defamed Susanna, claiming she had committed adultery with one Ralph Smith, a 35-year-old haberdasher, and had caught a venereal disease from Smith. On 15 July the Halls brought suit for slander against Lane in the Consistory Court at Worcester. Robert Whatcott, who three years later witnessed Shakespeare's will, testified for the Halls, but Lane failed to appear. Lane was found guilty and excommunicated. He was later involved in a riot to protest against Wilson.

== Writings ==
Hall prepared two notebooks of his case notes with the intention that they be published. They were purchased and translated from Latin by James Cooke (1614–1688), a surgeon. He published them in 1657, 22 years after Hall's death, as Select observations on English bodies, or Cures both empericall and historicall performed upon very eminent persons in desperate diseases. The earliest case, in Stratford, dates from 1611, making it almost certain that Hall lived and worked in Stratford from at least the time of his marriage. The first notebook still survives, but the original manuscript of the second notebook has been lost.

- Wells, Greg; Edmondson, Paul (Eds.): John Hall, Master of Physicke – a casebook from Shakespeare's Stratford, Manchester : Manchester University Press, 2020, ISBN 978-1-5261-3453-0

== Portrayals ==
The slander case has been used as the subject of a play, The Herbal Bed, by Peter Whelan. In the original production Hall was played by Liam Cunningham.

He was portrayed by Tom Hiddleston in A Waste of Shame: The Mystery of Shakespeare and His Sonnets, a TV film first broadcast on BBC Four on 22 November 2005 as part of a supporting programme for the BBC's ShakespeaRe-Told season.

Hadley Fraser portrayed him in the 2018 movie All Is True, directed by Kenneth Branagh.
