= Elizabeth Bernard (1608–1670) =

Granddaughter of William Shakespeare

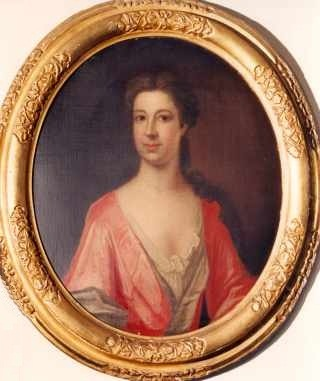
- Portrait of Lady Bernard
- Born: 1608; Stratford-upon-Avon, England
- Died: 17 February 1670 (aged 61); Abington, Northamptonshire, England
- Spouses: Thomas Nash (m. 1626; died 1647); John Bernard (m. 1649)
- Parents: John Hall; Susanna Shakespeare

Elizabeth, Lady Bernard (née Hall, formerly Nash; bapt. 21 February 1608 – 17 February 1670) was the granddaughter of the English poet, playwright and actor William Shakespeare and Anne Hathaway. Despite two marriages, she had no known children, and was the last surviving descendant of Shakespeare.

Elizabeth was closely associated with the Royalist cause during the English Civil War (1642 to 1651). Both her husbands were dedicated supporters of Charles I.

== Early life ==
Elizabeth Hall was born to Susanna Hall and Doctor John Hall. She was baptised in the Holy Trinity Church of Stratford-upon-Avon, England. She was the only grandchild William Shakespeare ever knew, because her three cousins were born after his death in 1616.

== First marriage ==
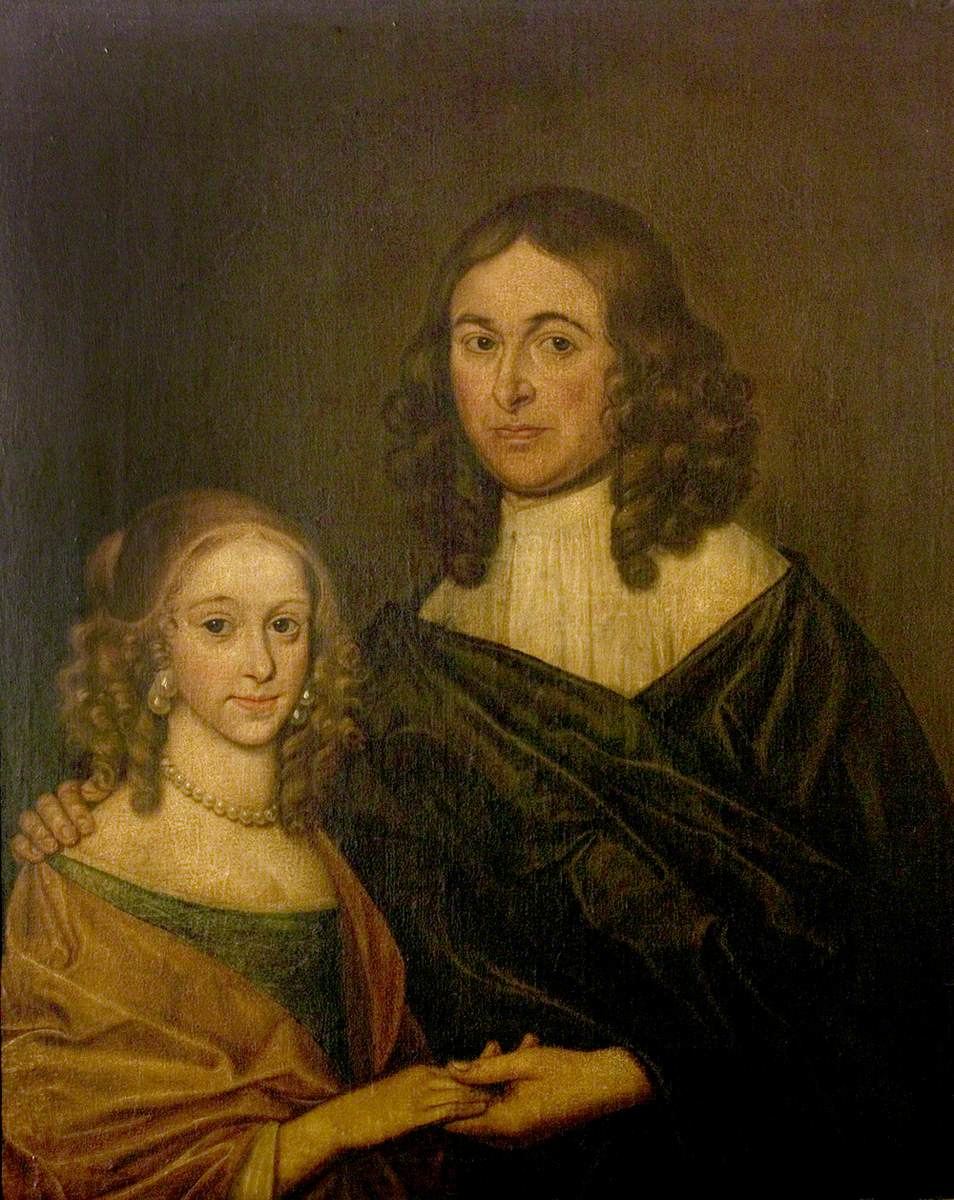
Elizabeth and her first husband, Thomas Nash

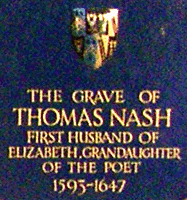
Thomas Nash's coat of arms impaled with those of his wife, Elizabeth.

In 1626, Elizabeth Hall married Thomas Nash, who was a member of the Manor and Lordship of Shottery. Nash was an ardent Royalist, a supporter of Charles I and a donor to the king's cause to the tune of £100. In July 1643 Queen Henrietta Maria stayed with the Nashes at New Place, in Stratford upon Avon, formerly home to William Shakespeare.

Thomas made his will on 25 August 1642, in which he left his house in Chapel Street and two meadows to Elizabeth. He left the bulk of his fortune to his cousin, Edward Nash, including New Place. However, whilst he lived in the house, he was not the owner and did not have the right to dispose of the property. Elizabeth's mother, Susanna Hall, eldest daughter of William Shakespeare and the inheritor of the majority of his estate, was the legal owner. The Nashes lived with her in New Place. On 4 April 1647, Thomas Nash died. Elizabeth was his executrice and she and her mother obtained a deed of settlement to confirm that they were still the legal holders of Shakespeare's estates. Edward Nash took Elizabeth Nash to chancery court the following year, demanding that she honour the terms of her late husband's will. His legal bid was not successful.

== Second marriage ==
On 5 June 1649, eighteen months after her first husband's death, Elizabeth married John Bernard (1604–74) of Abington, near Northampton. Bernard was a widower with several children. It is not known how they met, since he did not live near Stratford, but it was most likely through Elizabeth's Royalist connections. Like Nash, he had been a strong supporter of the Royalists in the Civil War. Five weeks after the marriage, Elizabeth's mother Susanna died. As a result, Elizabeth inherited the Shakespeare family property. The couple moved to Stratford, to live in New Place.

As a staunch Royalist, Bernard's social position improved dramatically after the Restoration in 1660. He was knighted on 25 September 1661, thus giving his wife the title Lady Bernard. They left Stratford to move into the Bernard family home in Abington. The couple had no children.

In February 1662, Judith Quiney died in Stratford-upon-Avon, making Elizabeth Bernard the last descendant of William Shakespeare. She wrote her will on 29 January 1669, which did not give much to her husband, Sir John Bernard. Elizabeth died at Abington, Northamptonshire on 17 February 1670. There is a memorial plaque in the Church of Saint Peter & Paul, Abington, where she is buried.

The family home of Sir John and Lady Bernard is now a museum, Abington Park Museum, and the grounds are now a park in the town of Northampton.

== See also ==
- Shakespeare's life
