= Court of Peculiars =

Ecclesiastical court of the Church of England

The Court of Peculiars is one of the ecclesiastical courts of the Church of England. The court sits with a Dean, who is also the Dean of the Arches. The Registrars are the Joint Provincial Registrars. The Court of Peculiars deals with all legal matters from peculiar parishes (Note: A peculiar parish is a parish outside the jurisdiction of the diocese in which it is located.) in the province. Until 1545, ecclesiastical judges were required to have a degree in canon law; thereafter, they only needed a doctorate in civil law. Binding precedent was only introduced into the ecclesiastical courts in the nineteenth century.

== List of deans of the court ==
- Sir Philip Wilbraham-Baker, c. 1938–1955
- Sir Henry Willink, 1955–1970
- Walter Wigglesworth, 1971–1972
- Sir Harold Kent, 1972–1976
- Kenneth Elphinstone, 1977–1980
- Sir John Owen, 1980–2000
- Sheila Cameron, 2000–2009
- Charles George, 2009–
