= William Clopton =

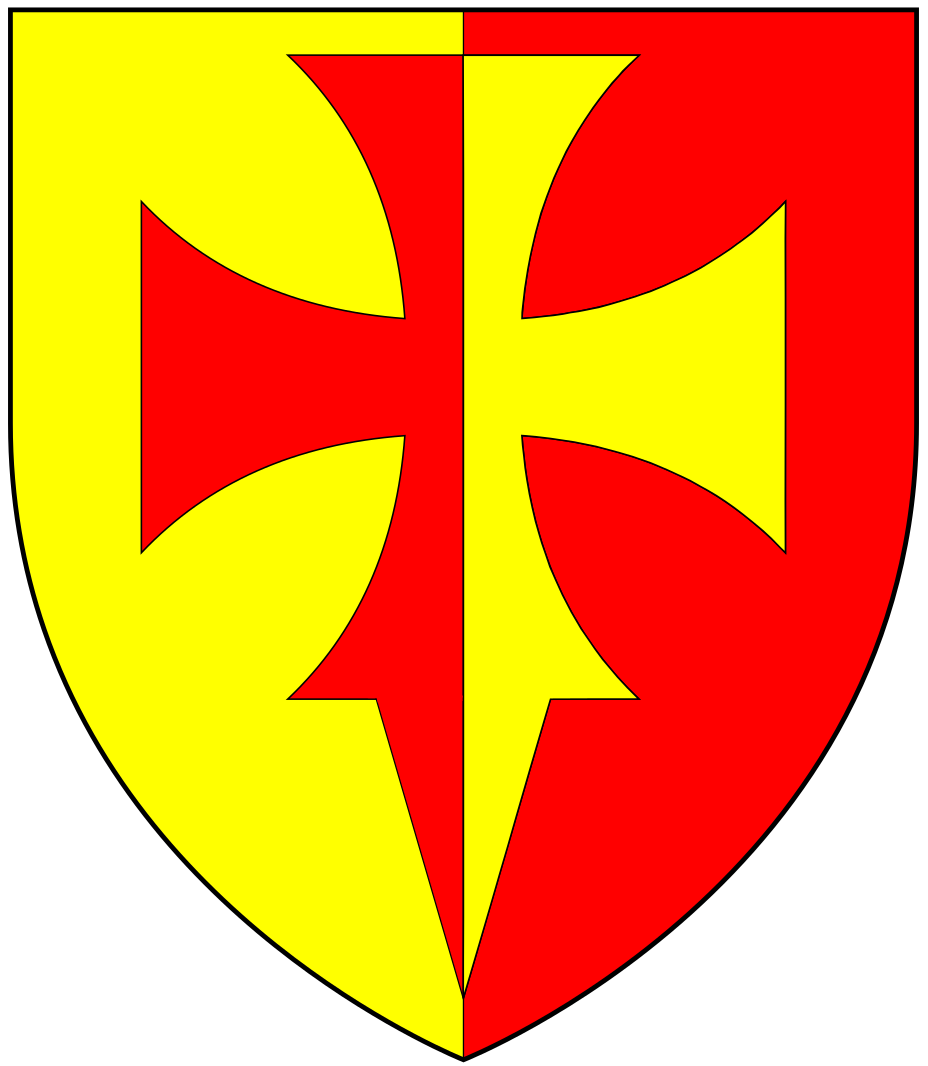
Arms of Clopton of Clopton, in the parish of Stratford-upon-Avon, Warwickshire: Per pale or and gules, a cross patée fitchée counterchanged. As seen on the monument to George Carew, 1st Earl of Totnes (1555–1629), and his wife Joyce Clopton (d.1637) in the Church of the Holy Trinity, Stratford-upon-Avon

William Clopton (1538–1592) was a member of the English gentry who inherited New Place in Stratford upon Avon, and in 1563 sold it to William Bott.

== Biography ==
William Clopton, born in 1538, was the second but only surviving son of William Clopton (died 1560), (Note: William Clopton was the great-great-great-nephew of Hugh Clopton (d.1496), Lord Mayor of London, builder of both New Place and the bridge at Stratford upon Avon.) and Elizabeth Grey, the daughter of Sir Edward Grey (d. 14 February 1529) of Enville, Staffordshire, and Joyce Horde. (Note: The Clopton pedigree in the Visitation of Warwick states that she was the daughter of Sir Edward Grey; however Grey pedigree in the same Visitation states that she was the daughter of Sir Edward Grey's son and heir, Thomas Grey; Fetherston 1877, pp. 42–3, 110.)

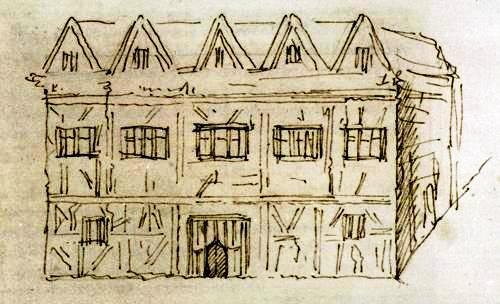
New Place, which William Clopton sold in 1563 to William Bott

From the thirteenth century, the Clopton family seat was Clopton House near Stratford upon Avon. William Clopton's father is said to have been the 'champion of the Catholic party' in the area, against William Lucy (d.1551) of Charlecote. He served the table of Queen Mary I with wafers at the feast which followed her coronation on 1 October 1553, receiving as his fee 'all the instruments as well of silver or other metal for making of the same wafers, and also all the napkins and other profits thereunto appertaining'.

William Clopton's parents died within a year of each other. His mother, Elizabeth Grey, was buried in Holy Trinity Church in Stratford on 31 January 1559, probably in what has been termed the Clopton chapel at the east end of the north aisle of the church. On 4 January 1560, his father made his last will, witnessed by his agent William Bott, requesting burial in the same place. After his father's death, Clopton resided at Clopton House, while his father's agent, William Bott, moved from his home in Snitterfield into New Place in Stratford upon Avon.

William Clopton, aged twenty-two at his father's death in 1560, was his father's only surviving son and heir, but in order to pay the legacies bequeathed to his four sisters, Anne, Elizabeth, Eleanor and Rose, and to finance his travels in Italy, he was forced to sell a portion of his inheritance. In 1563 he sold New Place to William Bott, who had already been residing there for some time. However in the following year he brought a case in the Court of Star Chamber against Bott, accusing him of fraud and forgery. Bott sold New Place in 1567 to William Underhill (c.1523 – 31 March 1570), an Inner Temple lawyer and substantial property holder in Warwickshire.

He is said to have built 'the oldest surviving portions of Clopton House'. He and his wife were Catholic recusants; however after his death it was reported that his widow 'goeth now to church'.

He died in 1592. His widow, Anne, survived him by two years; both were buried in Holy Trinity Church. As he had no surviving male issue, he had settled his property on his two surviving daughters, Joyce and Anne.

== Family ==
He married Anne, the daughter of Sir George Griffith, with whom he had two sons and four daughters:

- Lodowick, who died without issue.
- William, who died without issue.
- Elizabeth, who died without issue.
- Margery, who died without issue.
- Joyce (died 1635), who at the age of fifteen, in 1580, married George Carew, 1st Earl of Totnes (d.1629). There were no issue of the marriage. She and her husband are buried in the Clopton chapel Holy Trinity Church, where they are commemorated by a monument. (Note: After the death of his father-in-law Carew, purchased Clopton House, but as he had no issue the Clopton family's principal seat was again recovered by the Clopton family after Joyce Clopton's death in 1635. New Place also came back into the Clopton family's hands, but not until the eighteenth century.)
- Anne, who at the age of thirteen married, in 1589, her cousin William Clopton of Sledwick in Durham. He was the great-grandson of Hugh Clopton's younger brother, John Clopton, Merchant of the Staple.
