= Peter Whelan (playwright) =

Peter Whelan (3 October 1931 – 3 July 2014) was a British playwright.

Whelan was born and raised in Stoke-on-Trent, England. As a student from 1951–55 Whelan was an inspirational figure in the newly-formed Drama Society at the experimental University College of North Staffordshire, later Keele University. At Keele he met his wife Frangcon Price, who also excelled in drama as a student and in her later career. They married in 1958.

His works includes seven plays for the Royal Shakespeare Company, most of which are period pieces based on real historical events. The first of these was Captain Swing in 1979. Another was The Herbal Bed, about a court case involving William Shakespeare's daughter. It was first produced at the RSC's The Other Place theatre, Stratford-upon-Avon, in 1996 and was revived at The Duchess Theatre from April to October 1997.

In 2008, his play The School of Night, originally produced at The Other Place theatre, in November 1992, made its US debut at the Mark Taper Forum in Los Angeles. It fictionalizes the relationships between Shakespeare, Christopher Marlowe, Thomas Kyd and Sir Walter Raleigh as well as the events leading up to Marlowe's death.

In January 2018, his play Sleepers in the Field had its world premiere at The Questors Theatre, in Ealing, London.

Important papers of his are stored in the Borthwick Institute for Archives in the Library of the University of York.

== Plays ==
- Double Edge (1975) co-written with Leslie Darbon
- Captain Swing (1979)
- The Accrington Pals (1981)
- Clay (1982)
- A Cold Wind Blowing Up (1983) co-written with Leslie Darbon
- World's Apart (1986)
- The Bright and Bold Design (1991)
- The School of Night (1992)
- Shakespeare Country (1993)
- The Tinder Box (1995)
- The Divine Right (1996)
- The Herbal Bed (1996)
- Nativity (1997) co-written with Bill Alexander
- Overture (1997)
- A Russian in the Woods (2001)
- The Earthly Paradise (2004)
- Sleepers in the Field (2009)
