= New Place =

House in Stratford-upon-Avon associated with William Shakespeare

Coordinates: 52.1907°N 1.7076°W

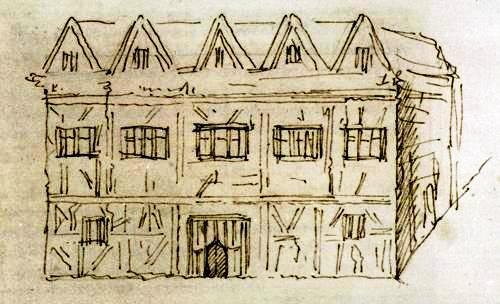
- New Place sketched by George Vertue from contemporary descriptions when he visited Stratford-upon-Avon in 1737
- Interactive map of the New Place area

General information
- Location: Chapel Street, Stratford-upon-Avon, Warwickshire, England
- OS grid reference: SP 201 548
- Completed: 1483
- Demolished: 1702
- Client: Sir Hugh Clopton
- Owner: Shakespeare Birthplace Trust (site)

Website
- https://www.shakespeare.org.uk/visit/shakespeares-new-place/

New Place was William Shakespeare's final place of residence in Stratford-upon-Avon. He died there in 1616. The whole building was demolished in 1702 by Sir John Clopton, who replaced it with a modern-style house, also called New Place. This in turn was demolished by Francis Gastrell, vicar of Frodsham, Cheshire, in 1759. It was never rebuilt after the second demolition and only the foundations remain.

Though the house no longer exists, the site is owned by the Shakespeare Birthplace Trust, which maintains it as a specially designed garden for tourists.

== Early history ==
The three-storey house stood on the corner of Chapel Street and Chapel Lane, and was apparently the second largest dwelling in the town. The current site of New Place was initially within the plot of an Iron Age farmstead sometime around 700 BC – 43 AD, as indicated by pottery that also dates to the same time period. New Place was built atop the site of a former 13th-century timber building in 1483 by Sir Hugh Clopton, a wealthy London mercer and Lord Mayor. Built of timber and brick (then an innovation in Stratford) it had ten fireplaces, five handsome gables, and grounds large enough to incorporate two barns and an orchard.

In 1496 Sir Hugh Clopton left New Place in his will to his great-nephew William Clopton I ('my cousin William Clopton') and the male heirs of the lordship of Clopton. In his will William Clopton I (d. 29 May 1521) granted his wife, Rose (d. 17 August 1525) a life interest in the property, with the reversion after her death to his son, William Clopton II. When John Leyland visited in 1540, he described New Place as a "praty house of Bricke and tymbre wherm he (ie Hugh Clopton) lived in his latter dayes and dyed". In November 1543, William Clopton II leased it for forty years to a surgeon, Thomas Bentley (d.1549), who left his wife, Anne, a life interest in the lease during her widowhood. Anne remarried, however, and after she became the wife of Richard Charnock, William Clopton II retook possession of New Place. By his wife Elizabeth Grey, the daughter of Sir Edward Grey of Enville, Staffordshire, William Clopton II had a son, William Clopton III (1537–1592), to whom he left New Place by will in 1560. On 20 December 1563, hard-pressed for money to pay his sisters' marriage portions and continue travelling in Italy, William Clopton III sold New Place to William Bott, who had already resided in it for several years. In 1567 Bott sold New Place to William Underhill I (c. 1523 – 31 March 1570), an Inner Temple lawyer and clerk of assizes at Warwick, and a substantial property holder in Warwickshire.

== Sale to Shakespeare ==
The final concord (a conveyance in two parts) between William Shakespeare and Hercules Underhill, confirming Shakespeare's title to New Place, Michaelmas 1602

At his death in 1570, Underhill left New Place to his son, William Underhill II (d.1597), who in May 1597 sold it to William Shakespeare for £60. He (William Underhill II) died two months later, and it emerged that he had been poisoned by his eldest son and heir, Fulke Underhill. According to some sources, Fulke Underhill died in May 1598 while still a minor and before the fact that he had murdered his father was discovered. According to other sources, however, Fulke Underhill was hanged in 1599 for his father's murder and attainted for felony, whereby his property, including New Place, was forfeit to the crown. In 1602 the Court of Exchequer appointed a commission to "obtain an account of the possessions of Fulke Underhill of Fillongley, county Warwick, felon, who had taken the life of his father, William Underhill, by poison". When Fulke's younger brother, Hercules Underhill, came of age in 1602, his father's former properties were regranted to him, and he and Shakespeare negotiated a confirmation of the sale.

== After Shakespeare's death ==
In 1616 the house passed directly to Shakespeare's eldest daughter Susanna Hall who lived there for some time. Her daughter, Elizabeth Hall, Shakespeare's last surviving descendant, lived in New Place with both her mother and her first husband, Thomas Nash, who had owned the house next door. Thomas Nash wrote a will on 25 August 1642, leaving New Place to his cousin Edward Nash, but had no legal right to do so as the house still belonged to Susanna Hall. This will went missing in the nineteenth century and was only rediscovered in the National Archives in 2025. After Nash predeceased both his wife and mother in law in 1647, the women obtained a deed of settlement to confirm that they were still the legal holders of Shakespeare's estates. Edward Nash took Elizabeth Nash to chancery court the following year, demanding that she honour the terms of her late husband's will. His legal bid was not successful.

Elizabeth Nash married for a second time, to John Bernard (MP for Northampton) on 5 June 1649 (1604–74). Just weeks after the marriage, Susanna Hall died and Elizabeth inherited the Shakespeare family property from her. The Bernards moved into New Place. On her death in 1670 Elizabeth left no surviving heirs. Her will stipulated "according to my promise formally made to him" that Edward Nash would have the right to acquire New Place, but there are no records of his having ownership. The house was returned to the Clopton family.

In 1702 Sir John Clopton demolished the original New Place, building in its place a replacement, also called New Place, in a very different contemporary style. In 1756 then-owner Reverend Francis Gastrell (vicar of Frodsham, Cheshire) having become tired of visitors, attacked and destroyed a mulberry tree in the garden said to have been planted by Shakespeare. In retaliation, the townsfolk destroyed New Place's windows. Gastrell applied for local permission to extend the garden. His application was rejected and his tax was increased, so Gastrell retaliated by demolishing the house in 1759. This greatly outraged the inhabitants and Gastrell was eventually forced to leave town.

The Shakespeare Birthplace Trust acquired New Place and Nash's House in 1876. Today the site of New Place is accessible through a museum that resides in Nash's House, the house next door. The site received 109,452 visitors during 2018.

== Archaeological excavations ==
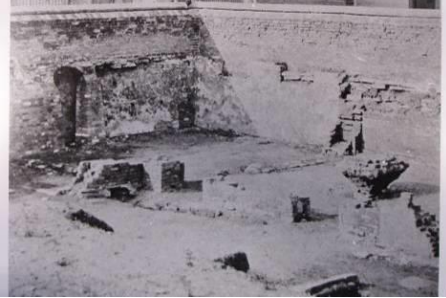
Photograph of the ruins of New Place in January 1864

Excavations in the grounds of Nash's House were initially carried out in 1862 and January 1864 by James Halliwell-Phillipps but after the excavations were finished, the ruins were eventually covered up by a garden and further excavations carried out during 2010, 2011 and 2012 by Birmingham Archaeology, removing the garden from the site all together. Archaeologists from Time Team visited the dig during 2011 and a special programme on the subject, "Searching for Shakespeare's House", was transmitted on 11 March 2012. BBC One National Treasures broadcast a live programme from the site in August 2011. Findings from the excavation indicated the presence of a Tudor structure but were inconclusive as to the ground plan of Shakespeare's original house.

=== Clay pipe fragments at Stratford-upon-Avon ===
Clay pipe fragments unearthed in recent years in Shakespeare's Stratford-upon-Avon garden were found to possibly contain traces of cannabis, along with tobacco and camphor, based on the results of a study published in the South African Journal of Science. This has fuelled speculation by some that Shakespeare may have possibly smoked cannabis, which is known to have been used to treat certain medical conditions at the time by Elizabethans, as well as in the manufacture of materials such as sails, rope, and clothing, and may have also been used for purposes of pleasure. The pipe fragments, however, could have belonged to any number of other persons besides the famous playwright, and cannot be definitively dated to the periods of his residency there as they could have been from the 18th century, around 200 years after Shakespeare's death.

== Gallery ==
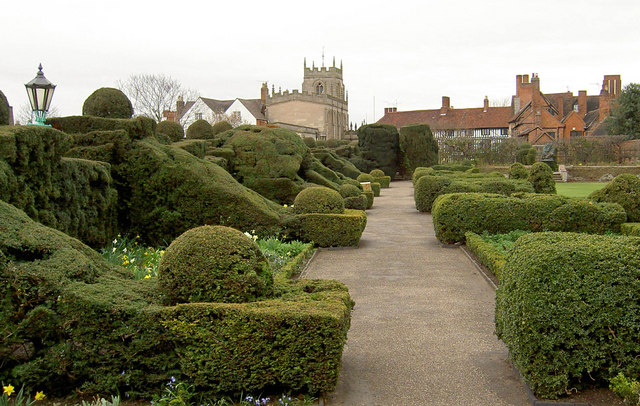
Gardens

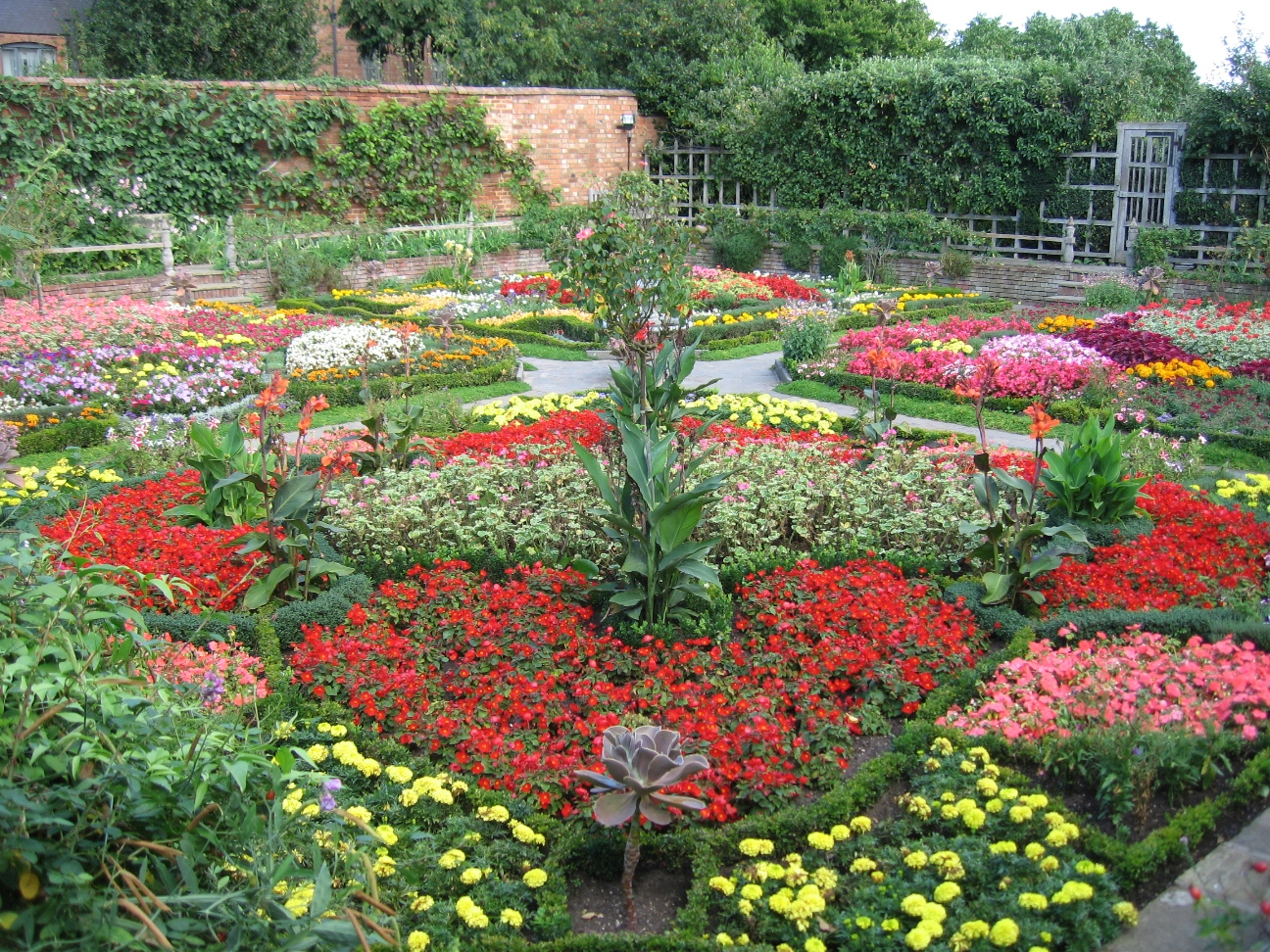
Knot Garden, New Place

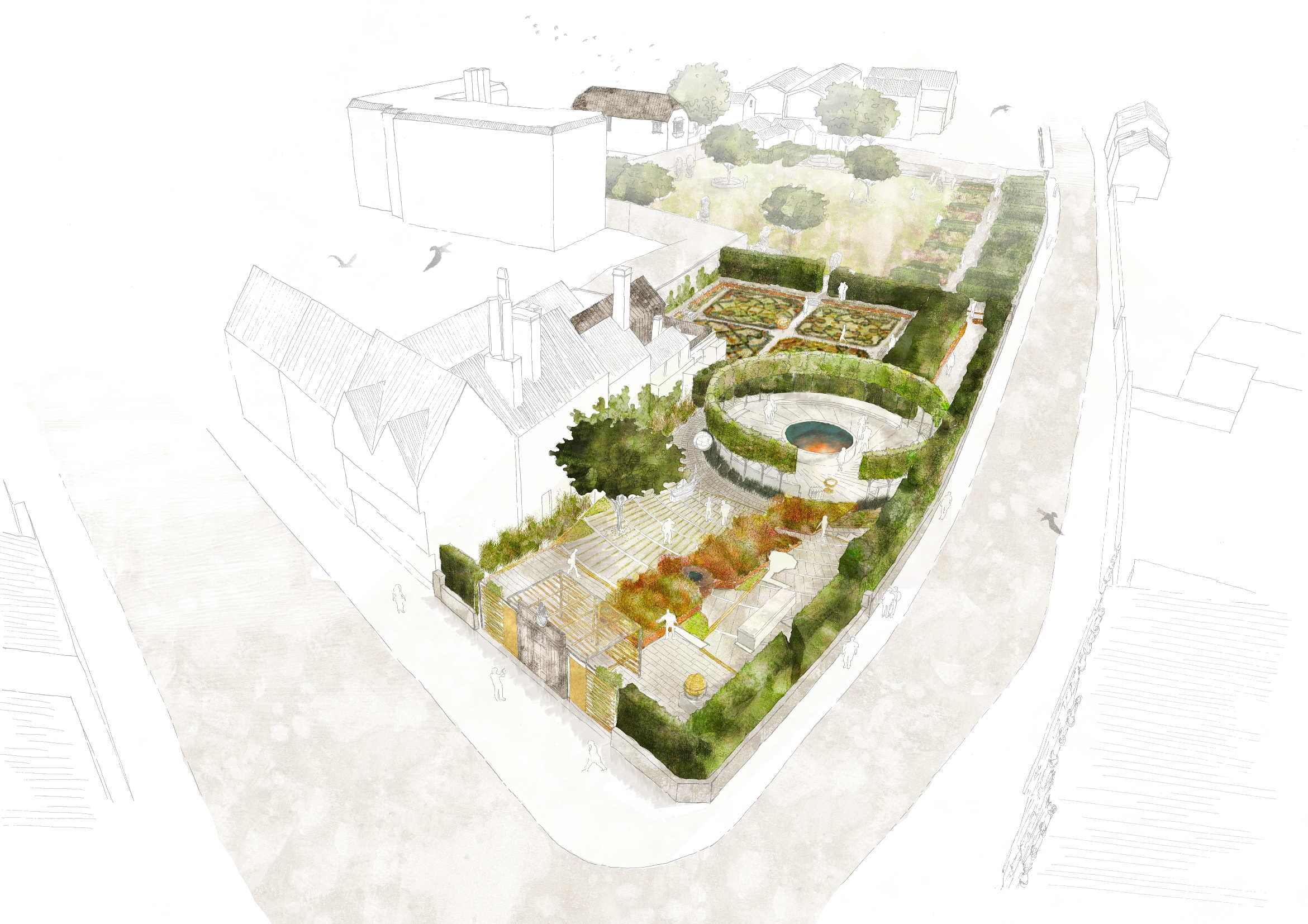
Artist impression of Shakespeares New Place opening July 2016

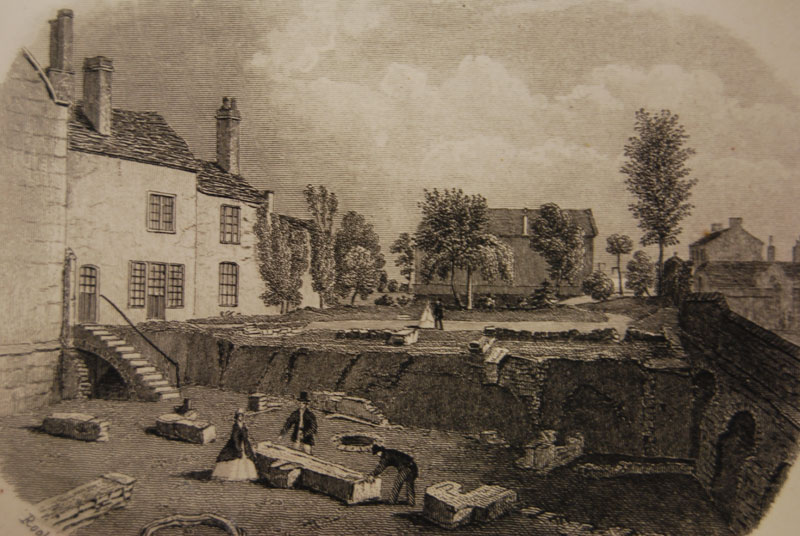
Site of the ruins of New Place next to Nash's House in January 1864

== See also ==
- Shakespeare garden
