= Aviair =

Australian airline

IATA	ICAO	Call sign
GD	—	—
- Founded: 1984
- Hubs: East Kimberley Regional Airport
- Secondary hubs: Broome, Karratha
- Alliance: Nexus Airlines
- Fleet size: 30
- Destinations: 8
- Parent company: HM Consolidated Group
- Headquarters: Kununurra, Western Australia
- Website: www.aviair.com.au

Aviair, previously known as Slingair Heliwork, is an airline and air charter company based in Kununurra, Western Australia. It operates air charter services and regular passenger services. Its main bases are at East Kimberley, Broome and Karratha airports.

== History ==
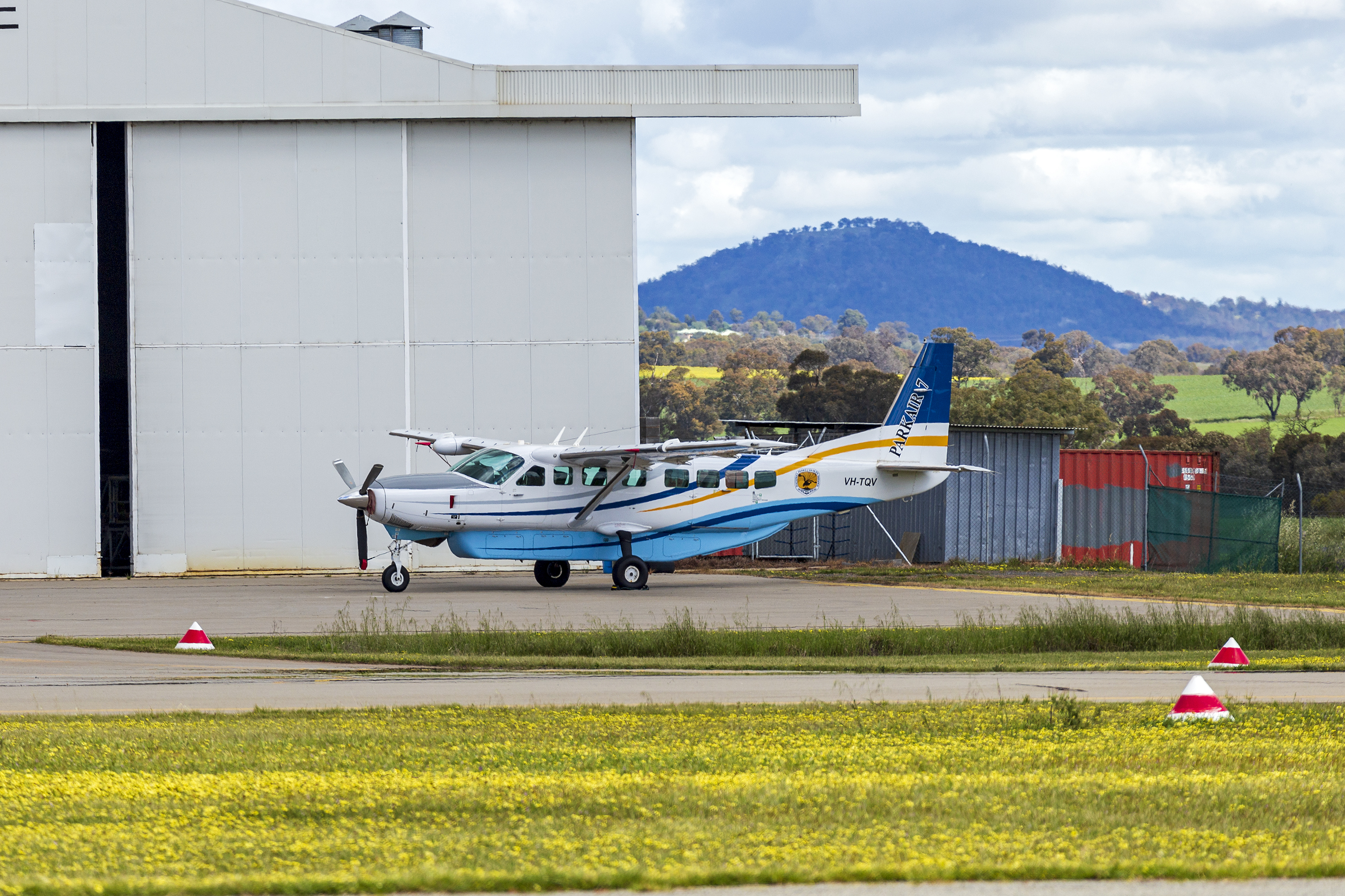
Aviair, contracted for the NSW National Parks & Wildlife Service as Parkair 7, (VH-TQV) Cessna 208B Grand Caravan at Wagga Wagga Airport

Aviair was established in 1984 as Slingair Heliwork by Kerry Slingsby. Aviair began providing air services in Kununurra, Western Australia shortly after its foundation. It is a wholly owned subsidiary of HM Consolidated Group.

Slingair received the Sir David Brand Award every year from 1996 to 1998 and was a finalist in 2000.

In May 2008, Grant Kenny acquired Slingair.

In 2010 and 2015 Slingair supported field research for discovering rock shelters and artworks made by Aboriginal Australians in the Kimberley.

In 2016 Slingair was purchased by the owners of HeliSpirit, Michael McConachy and Geoff Hamilton. Slingair was renamed Aviair. Further field research in the Kimberley region was supported by Aviair in 2019.

On 16 August 2021, Aviair commenced a service from Derby to Broome.

== Destinations ==
Aviair provides scheduled services to the following destinations: These are operated with a subsidy from the Government of Western Australia.

- Balgo
- Broome
- Derby
- Halls Creek
- Kalumburu
- Karratha
- Kununurra
- Newman
- Port Hedland

== Fleet ==
As of August 2025, the Aviair fleet includes the following aircraft:

- 5 De Havilland Canada DHC-8-400

As of 2021, the Aviair fleet consisted of the following aircraft:

Aviair fleet
Aircraft	In service	Orders	Notes
King Air B200	3	—	
Cessna 208 Caravan	13	—	
Pilatus PC-12	5	—	
GippsAero GA8 Airvan	1	—	
Beechcraft G58 Baron	1	—	
Cessna Citation Mustang	2	—	
Total	25	0	—

== Incidents and accidents ==
- On 18 August 2011, one of Slingair's former Cessna 210 Centurion aircraft (registration VH-OCM) performed a forced landing 800 meters short of runway 12 at East Kimberley Regional Airport due to the pilot failing to switch selected fuel tanks, causing engine to stop.
- On 8 August 2015, one of Slingairs's Cessna 208 Caravan aircraft (registration VH-LNH) experienced an oil leak which forced them to return to their airport of origin.
- On 16 November 2016, one of Aviair's Cessna 208 Caravan aircraft (registration VH-LNH) made a forced landing 8 km north-west of Solomon Airport, Western Australia due to an engine failure.
- On 16 April 2022, an Aviair Beechcraft Baron aircraft (registration VH-NPT) with a pilot and passenger onboard was involved in a fire during final approach for runway 12 at East Kimberley Regional Airport which resulted in a runway undershoot. The passenger was fatally injured and the aircraft was destroyed.

== See also ==
- List of airlines in Australia
- List of defunct airlines of Australia
- Regional Aviation Association of Australia
