= 2023 Special Honours (Australia) =

The Special Honours Lists for Australia are announced by the Sovereign and Governor-General at any time.

Some honours are awarded by other countries where King Charles III is the Head of State and Australians receiving those honours are listed here with the relevant reference.

This list also incorporates the Mid Winters Day honours list and the Bravery honours lists.

== Order of Australia ==
Ribbon bar of the Order of Australia (General)

Ribbon bar of the Order of Australia (Military)

=== Officer of the Order of Australia (AO) ===
Military

- Major General Andrew William Bottrell, CSC & Bar, DSM – 11 April 2023 – For distinguished service as Commander of the 17th Brigade, Commander Joint Agency Task Force for Operation Sovereign Borders and Head Land Systems, Capability Acquisition and Sustainability Group.

Honorary Military

- Major General Kelvin Khong – 8 February 2023 – For distinguished service in fostering the military relationship between the Republic of Singapore and Australia through strategic vision, outstanding personal commitment and exceptional leadership, and in recognition of his role in supporting Australia during times of great need.
- Lieutenant General Scott Berrier – 29 March 2023 – For distinguished service to strengthening the defence intelligence relationship between Australia and the United States of America through leadership, dedication and strategic foresight as Director Defense Intelligence Agency.
- General Affendi Buang – 19 April 2023 – For distinguished service to strengthening the defence relationship between Australia and Malaysia through commitment, leadership and strategic foresight as the Malaysian Chief of Defence Force.
- General Dudung Abdurachman – 9 October 2023 – For distinguished service as the Chief of Staff of the Indonesian Army in enhancing the relationship and interoperability between the Australian Army and the Indonesian Army.
- Air Chief Marshal Fadjar Prasetyo – 16 October 2023 – For distinguished service to the Republic of Indonesia and Australia through strategic vision and promotion and enhancement of the military-to-military relationship between the two countries.

Honorary General

- Ratan Tata, GBE – 17 March 2023 – For distinguished service to the Australia-India bilateral relationship, particularly to trade, investment and philanthropy.

=== Member of the Order of Australia (AM) ===
Honorary General

- General Elrick Irastorza (Retd) – 16 August 2023 – For significant service to the relationship between Australia and France, during the ANZAC Centenary Commemorative period in France (2014-2018).

=== Medal of the Order of Australia (OAM) ===
Honorary General

- Jennifer Jean Macaulay – 8 February 2023 – For service to the community of Portarlington, Victoria, particularly through educational and cultural initiatives.
- Pierre Seillier – 8 February 2023 – For service to commemorating Australia's military service, particularly during World War I at the Western Front at Fromelles, France.
- Tham Yau Kong – 5 April 2023 – For service to commemorating the sacrifice of Australian prisoners of war in Malaysia, particularly along the Sandakan-Ranau death march (1942–1945).

== Royal Victorian Order ==
Ribbon bar of the Royal Victorian Order

=== Commander of the Royal Victorian Order (CVO) ===
- Her Excellency The Honourable Linda Dessau, AC – Governor of Victoria. Awarded as part of the 2023 New Year Honours
- Her Honour The Honourable Vicki O'Halloran, AO – Administrator of the Northern Territory. Awarded as part of the 2023 New Year Honours

=== Lieutenant of the Royal Victorian Order (LVO) ===
- Colonel Michael John Miller, RFD – Official Secretary to the Governor of New South Wales, Australia. Awarded as part of the 2023 New Year Honours

=== Member of the Royal Victorian Order (MVO) ===
- Anna Maria Rischitelli, Functions Co-ordinator, Government House, Victoria, Australia. Awarded as part of the 2023 Birthday Honours

== Most Excellent Order of the British Empire ==
Ribbon bar of the Order of the British Empire (Civil)

=== Commander of the Order of the British Empire (CBE) ===
- Professor John Mitchell Finnis, AC, KC, FBA – Professor and Legal Academic. For services to Legal Scholarship. Awarded as part of the 2023 New Year Honours

== Medal for Gallantry (MG) ==
Ribbon bar of the Medal for Gallantry

- Mr (then Private) Alan James Parr, OAM – 23 May 2023 – For acts of gallantry in action in hazardous circumstances as the radio operator in the 1st Battalion, the Royal Australian Regiment's mortar line during the Battle for Fire Support Base Coral in Vietnam on 13 May 1968.
- Mr (then Sapper) Murray Clarke Walker - 18 July 2023 - For acts of gallantry in action in hazardous circumstances in Vietnam on 18 February and 22 March 1968.
- Major (then Lieutenant) Mark Augustine Moloney (Retd) – 19 July 2023 – For acts of gallantry in action in hazardous circumstances as the platoon commander 8 Platoon, Charlie Company, 7th Battalion, the Royal Australian Regiment at Bien Hoa Province on 7 February 1968.

== Bravery Medal (BM) ==
Ribbon bar of the Bravery Medal

- Nicholas Andrew Austin – Mr Nicholas Austin displayed considerable bravery for his actions during the attempted rescue of a kite surfer in Geraldton, Western Australia on 20 October 2016.
- Belana Broadley – Miss Belana Broadley displayed considerable bravery for her actions during the rescue of two young girls caught in a rip in Ballina, New South Wales on 30 January 2021.
- Leading Senior Constable Grant Andrew Healey, Victoria Police – Leading Senior Constable Grant Healey displayed considerable bravery for his actions during the attempted rescue of a person from a house fire in Elmhurst, Victoria on 28 December 2019.
- The late Leonie Mary Jackson – The late Ms Leonie Jackson displayed considerable bravery for her actions rescuing her two children from a rip in Congo, New South Wales on 17 January 2021.
- The late Salesi Finau Kalauta – The late Mr Salesi Kalauta displayed considerable bravery during the interception of a man armed with a rifle in Petersham, New South Wales on 27 December 2014.
- Michael Robert King – Mr Michael King displayed considerable bravery for his actions rescuing an elderly resident from a house fire in Katanning, Western Australia on 5 September 2019.
- Frank Daniel Montague – Mr Frank Daniel Montague displayed considerable bravery for his actions during the rescue of a young boy from a rip in Maroochydore, Queensland on 4 September 2020.
- Elyse Maisie Partridge – Miss Elyse Maisie Partridge displayed considerable bravery for her actions during the rescue of two young girls caught in a rip in Ballina, New South Wales on 30 January 2021.
- Melwin (Mesut) Polat – Mr Melwin (Mesut) Polat displayed considerable bravery for his actions rescuing a woman from a burning vehicle in Carlisle, Western Australia on 12 February 2022.
- Rupert John Rudd – Mr Rupert Rudd displayed considerable bravery for his actions during the apprehension of an armed offender in Yokine, Western Australia on 21 October 2016.
- James Christopher Waterbury – Mr James Waterbury displayed considerable bravery for his actions during the attempted rescue of a kite surfer in Geraldton, Western Australia on 20 October 2016.
- Alicia Maree Bain – Miss Alicia Bain displayed considerable bravery by her actions following a shark attack in Greenmount, Queensland on 8 September 2020.
- Cameron Candy – Mr Cameron Candy displayed considerable bravery by his actions apprehending an armed offender in Minchinbury, New South Wales on 21 August 2020.
- Daniel Wade Candy – Mr Daniel Candy displayed considerable bravery by his actions apprehending an armed offender in Minchinbury, New South Wales on 21 August 2020.
- Esira Salusalu – Mr Esira Salusalu displayed considerable bravery by his actions during an assault in Forest Lake, Queensland on 14 August 2017.

== Order of St John ==
Order of St John ribbon

=== Knight of the Order of St John ===
- His Excellency The Honourable Chris Dawson, AC, APM – 31 January 2023 – On his appointment as the Governor of Western Australia.
- His Honour The Honourable Hugh Heggie, PSM – 5 February 2023 – On his appointment as the Administrator of the Northern Territory.
- Robert Wilson – 16 November 2023

=== Dame of the Order of St John ===
- Her Excellency The Honourable Margaret Gardner, AC – 14 September 2023 – On her appointment as the Governor of Victoria.
- Valmai Dempsey – 16 November 2023

=== Commander of the Order of St John ===
- Alistair Dunn – 16 November 2023
- Eleanor Hill – 16 November 2023
- Karen Limb – 16 November 2023
- Ilan Lowbeer – 16 November 2023
- Sean McGuinness – 16 November 2023
- Rolf Schafer – 16 November 2023
- Anthony Smith – 16 November 2023

=== Officer of the Order of St John ===
- Kathleen Broadbent – 16 November 2023
- Brett Butler – 16 November 2023
- Ian Digweed – 16 November 2023
- Rhys Dowell – 16 November 2023
- Thomas Drake-Brockman – 16 November 2023
- Barbara Groves – 16 November 2023
- Rodney Hocking – 16 November 2023
- Brain Gallop – 16 November 2023
- Mark Engel – 16 November 2023
- John Gallagher – 16 November 2023
- Ross Parkinson – 16 November 2023
- Ian Rae – 16 November 2023
- Lynda Tyler – 16 November 2023

=== Member of the Order of St John ===
- Tyrone Andrews
- Edward Anstee – 16 November 2023
- Bevan Bailye – 16 November 2023
- David Boadle – 16 November 2023
- Charlie Bartak – 16 November 2023
- Shannan Bradley – 16 November 2023
- Connie Bruynen – 16 November 2023
- Brenda Brown – 16 November 2023
- Rodney Burgess – 16 November 2023
- Celia Campbell – 16 November 2023
- Hayley Clarke – 16 November 2023
- Mark Cockburn – 16 November 2023
- Serena Coleman – 16 November 2023
- Lance Cooper – 16 November 2023
- Bradley Costin – 16 November 2023
- Kerrilee Dennis – 16 November 2023
- Carole Donaldson – 16 November 2023
- Janine Doney – 16 November 2023
- Rachael Doney – 16 November 2023
- Ross Doney – 16 November 2023
- Catherine Driver – 16 November 2023
- Craig Ellis – 16 November 2023
- Caroline Elliott – 16 November 2023
- Sabrina Erdossy – 16 November 2023
- Heidi Fischer – 16 November 2023
- Catherine Graham – 16 November 2023
- Shane Gray – 16 November 2023
- Stuart Green – 16 November 2023
- Kelly Guest – 16 November 2023
- Jay Hammond – 16 November 2023
- Caryn Hargrave – 16 November 2023
- Paul Harrington – 16 November 2023
- Kelly Harverson – 16 November 2023
- Abbey Hay – 16 November 2023
- Claire Hensby – 16 November 2023
- James Hunt – 16 November 2023
- Tracie Ironside – 16 November 2023
- Matthew Jaskolski – 16 November 2023
- Victoria Jones – 16 November 2023
- Jennifer Joseph – 16 November 2023
- Jade Kirk – 16 November 2023
- Jamie Kopper – 16 November 2023
- Michelle Lamont – 16 November 2023
- Chelsea Lazar – 16 November 2023
- James Leigh – 16 November 2023
- Rocky Liang – 16 November 2023
- Davide Luisetto – 16 November 2023
- Belinda Marsh – 16 November 2023
- Shirley Marsh – 16 November 2023
- Mavis Marshall – 16 November 2023
- Mark McDonald – 16 November 2023
- Michael Morgan – 16 November 2023
- Keita Morimoto – 16 November 2023
- Shane Munro – 16 November 2023
- Hamish Nicholls – 16 November 2023
- Erin Nugent – 16 November 2023
- Leonardo Pane – 16 November 2023
- Elizabeth Ravalli – 16 November 2023
- Darryl Shaw – 16 November 2023
- Catherine Smith – 16 November 2023
- Michaela Stone – 16 November 2023
- Thomas Theel – 16 November 2023
- Beth Trezona – 16 November 2023
- Damien Vickers – 16 November 2023
- Hilary Warrington – 16 November 2023
- Adrian Watts – 16 November 2023
- Deborah Williams – 16 November 2023
- Craig Zaal – 16 November 2023
- Andrew Zollia – 16 November 2023

== Australian Antarctic Medal (AAM) ==
Australian Antarctic Medal ribbon

- Robert Anders King – 21 June 2023 – For his outstanding contribution to the Australian Antarctic Program, particularly through innovative research in marine biology.
- Aaron Charles Read – 21 June 2023 – For his outstanding contribution to the Australian Antarctic Program, particularly through the establishment and leadership of the Wilkins Ice Runway Aerodrome in East Antarctica.
- Lisa Anne Wilkinson – 21 June 2023 – For her outstanding contribution to the Australian Antarctic Program, particularly through advocacy for diversity and inclusion.

== Commendation for Gallantry ==
Ribbon bar of the Commendation for Gallantry

Australian Army

- Private Richard Murray - 20 July 2023 - For an act of gallantry in action while a Far East Prisoner of War at Ranau which resulted in his execution on 20 May 1945.

== Commendation for Brave Conduct ==
Ribbon bar of the Commendation for Brave Conduct

- Gregory John Anderson – Mr Gregory Anderson is commended for brave conduct for his actions during the attempted rescue of a man from a rip in Currumbin, Queensland on 6 November 2020.
- Leading Senior Constable Simon John Barker, Victoria Police – Leading Senior Constable Simon Barker is commended for brave conduct for his actions during the rescue of two people from a submerged car in Creswick, Victoria on 7 November 2019.
- Sergeant Mark Jason Eade, Victoria Police – Sergeant Mark Eade is commended for brave conduct for his actions rescuing a man on fire in Shepparton, Victoria on 28 February 2021.
- Matthew James Ferrier – Mr Matthew Ferrier is commended for brave conduct for his actions rescuing a man caught in a rip in Marcoola, Queensland on 12 April 2005.
- Timothy Berrigan Gaunt – Mr Timothy Gaunt is commended for brave conduct for his actions rescuing a young girl from a rip in Killcare, New South Wales on 19 April 2022.
- Andrew David Hobman – Mr Andrew Hobman is commended for brave conduct for his actions assisting victims of a stabbing attack in Gordonvale, Queensland on 14 March 2016.
- Mr Lindsay John Larner – Mr Lindsay Larner is commended for brave conduct for his actions rescuing a trapped driver from a burning vehicle in Philpott, Queensland on 11 February 2021.
- Benjamin Charles McCauley – Mr Ben McCauley is commended for brave conduct for his actions retrieving a shark attack victim in Cid Harbour on Whitsunday Island, Queensland on 19 September 2018.
- Robert Malcolm Medaris – Mr Robert Medaris is commended for brave conduct for his actions assisting two girls who were caught in a rip on the Gold Coast, Queensland on 10 December 2020.
- Leading Senior Constable Raymond James Moreland, Victoria Police – Leading Senior Constable Raymond Moreland is commended for brave conduct for his actions during the rescue of two people from a burning property in Buchan, Victoria on 30 December 2019.
- Mabel Rose Oxenham – Miss Mabel Oxenham is commended for brave conduct for her actions during the rescue of a woman from Sydney Harbour, New South Wales on 14 December 2021.
- Trevor Thomas Parminter – Mr Trevor Parminter is commended for brave conduct for his actions during the rescue of a woman from a burning vehicle in Wickepin, Western Australia on 10 February 2021.
- Trevor Kenneth Richards – Mr Trevor Richards is commended for brave conduct for his actions when he pushed a woman out of the path of an out of control vehicle in Woodford, Queensland on 22 April 2019.
- Riley Seccull – Mr Riley Seccull is commended for brave conduct for his actions during the rescue of an elderly man from a house fire in Ballarat, Victoria on 22 February 2020.
- Lucas Glenn Short – Mr Luke Short is commended for brave conduct for his actions rescuing two swimmers in Angourie, New South Wales on 2 January 2022.
- Steven Tanevski – Mr Steven Tanevski is commended for brave conduct for his actions rescuing three people from the Wollondilly River in Goodmans Ford, New South Wales on 17 January 2022.
- Leading Senior Constable Andrew Peter Trace, Victoria Police – Leading Senior Constable Andrew Trace is commended for brave conduct for his actions during the rescue of two people from a burning property in Buchan, Victoria on 30 December 2019.
- Leading Seaman Trent Traynor, Royal Australian Navy – Leading Seaman Trent Traynor is commended for brave conduct for his actions during a submarine fire in Rockingham, Western Australia on 8 April 2021.
- Daniel Lee White – Mr Daniel White is commended for brave conduct for his actions during the rescue of a man from a burning vehicle in Baynton, Victoria on 30 March 2018.
- Petty Officer James Edmund Willson, Royal Australian Navy – Petty Officer James Willson is commended for brave conduct for his actions during a submarine fire in Rockingham, Western Australia on 8 April 2021.
- Daniel Gareth Wilson – Mr Daniel Wilson is commended for brave conduct for his actions during a house fire in West Gladstone, Queensland on 15 February 2017.
- Steven John Bradbury, OAM – Mr Steven Bradbury is commended for brave conduct for his actions during the rescue of four teenagers from rough seas in Caloundra, Queensland on 5 March 2022.
- Turawaho Hemopo – Mr Turawaho Hemopo is commended for brave conduct for his actions apprehending an offender in Yarrabilba, Queensland on 27 February 2020.
- Senior Sergeant Johnny Patrick Lombardi, Victoria Police – Senior Sergeant Johnny Lombardi is commended for brave conduct for his actions after a vehicle drove through a crowd of people in Melbourne, Victoria on 21 December 2017.
- Peter Robert Moore – Mr Peter Moore is commended for brave conduct for his actions retrieving two people from rough seas in Shoalwater, Western Australia on 22 May 2022.
- Lisa (Evalina) Jane Woodward – Miss Lisa (Evalina) Woodward is commended for brave conduct for her actions during an assault at a youth justice centre in Malmsbury, Victoria on 3 October 2019.

== Commendation for Distinguished Service ==
Ribbon bar of the Commendation for Distinguished Service

Australian Army

- Mr (then Sapper) Rohan Paul Conlon - 27 September 2023 - For distinguished performance of duty whilst deployed on warlike operations as a Combat Engineer in Mentoring and Reconstruction Task Force 2 on Operation SLIPPER on 7 July 2009.

== Group Bravery Citation ==
The recipients are recognised with the award of the Group Bravery Citation for their actions during the rescue of people from burning vehicles in Breton Bay, Western Australia on 27 August 2019.

- Zhenbo Fang

The recipients are recognised with the award of the Group Bravery Citation for their actions during the rescue of two people from a burning car in Morwell, Victoria on 29 April 2019.

- Detective Leading Senior Constable Joey Anton Kurtschenkp, Victoria Police
- Detective Senior Constable Jarred Lindsay Smith, Victoria Police
- Sergeant Mark James Smith, Victoria Police

The recipients are recognised with the award of the Group Bravery Citation for their actions after a building exploded and caught fire in Wentworthville, New South Wales on 8 October 2013.

- Senior Constable Domenico Barillaro, New South Wales Police
- Senior Constable K, New South Wales Police
- Rabii Haddad
- Senior Constable Chantelle Hannah, New South Wales Police
- Detective Sergeant Sean Martin Heagney, New South Wales Police
- Senior Constable Joshua Jones, New South Wales Police
- Senior Constable Todd Kirk, New South Wales Police
- Senior Constable Ergun Koksal, New South Wales Police
- Senior Constable Kelly Scholes, New South Wales Police
- Gilbert Alex Varlet

The recipients are recognised with the award of the Group Bravery Citation for their actions rescuing people from burning vehicles following a collision on the Bruce Highway near Gindoran, Queensland on 5 August 2020.

- Dean Andrew Bird
- Glen Kenneth Dissell
- The late Matthew James Stockman

The recipients are recognised with the award of the Group Bravery Citation for their actions during the attempted rescue of a man from a dog attack in Mill Park, Victoria on 10 July 2019.

- Senior Constable David Bojczenko, Victoria Police
- Senior Constable Priyanka Dunlop, Victoria Police
- Senior Constable Rebecca Noviello, Victoria Police
- Senior Constable Thomas William Shakespear, Victoria Police

The recipients are recognised with the award of the Group Bravery Citation for their actions following a multi-vehicle collision on the Bruce Highway near Tiaro, Queensland on 17 April 2017.

- Ann Margaret Gillies
- Gary Gordon Gillies, ASM
- Jack McInnes
- Stephen Kenneth Rainbow

The recipients are recognised with the award of the Group Bravery Citation for their actions during the attempted rescue of a man from a house fire in Elmhurst, Victoria on 28 December 2019.

- Jonathan Keith
- Sarah Nanette Keith
- Justin McKenzie
- Geoffrey Douglas Penna, OAM
- Geoffrey Rogers
- Mark Stephens
- Steven Craig Witting
- Peter Wilson

The recipients are recognised with the award of the Group Bravery Citation for their actions rescuing multiple people from a rip at Petrel Cove Beach in Encounter Bay, South Australia on 27 January 2023.

- Edward Michael Blight
- Henry John Weir
- Henry Murray Sever

This recipient is added to the Group Bravery Citation gazetted on 31 March 2020. The recipients are recognised with the award of the Group Bravery Citation for their actions during the rescue of a man from a burning vehicle at Gympie in Queensland.

- Senior Constable Kevin Alva Mayo, Queensland Police Service

== Meritorious Unit Citation ==
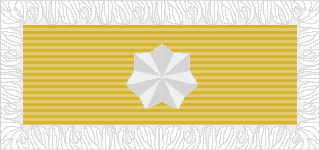
Insignia as worn by members of unit when awarded.

- HMAS Tobruk – 20 November 2023
  - For sustained outstanding service in warlike operations on Operation SOLACE in support of United Nations Security Council Resolution 794 to end hostilities in Somalia and establish a secure environment for the distribution of humanitarian aid in 1993.
- 1st Battalion, Royal Australian Regiment – 20 November 2023
  - For sustained outstanding service in warlike operations as part of the Unified Task Force on Operation SOLACE in Somalia, over the period December 1992 to May 1993.
- Australian Service Contingents I, II, III and IV – 20 November 2023
  - For sustained outstanding service in warlike operations as part of the first and second United Nations Operations in Somalia on Operation IGUANA, over the period October 1992 to November 1994.

== Queen Elizabeth II Platinum Jubilee Medal ==
Platinum Jubilee medal ribbon

Cross of Valour

- Timothy Britten, CV – 2 May 2023
- Darrell Tree, CV – 1 October 2023

== Theatre Honour ==
- 7th Battalion, Royal Australian Regiment - 15 October 2023 - Awarded the Theatre honour ‘Iraq 2003-2011’.
