= Hardy Aviation =

Australian airline

IATA	ICAO	Call sign
-	-	-
- Founded: 1991
- Hubs: Darwin International Airport
- Frequent-flyer program: None
- Fleet size: 29
- Headquarters: Darwin, Northern Territory, Australia
- Key people: John Hardy (Founder)
- Employees: 90
- Website: hardyaviation.com.au

Hardy Aviation (N.T.) Pty Ltd, is an air charter company based at Darwin International Airport in Darwin, Northern Territory, Australia. It operates air charter services. Its main base is Darwin International Airport.

Hardy Aviation is a member of the Regional Aviation Association of Australia (RAAA).

== History ==
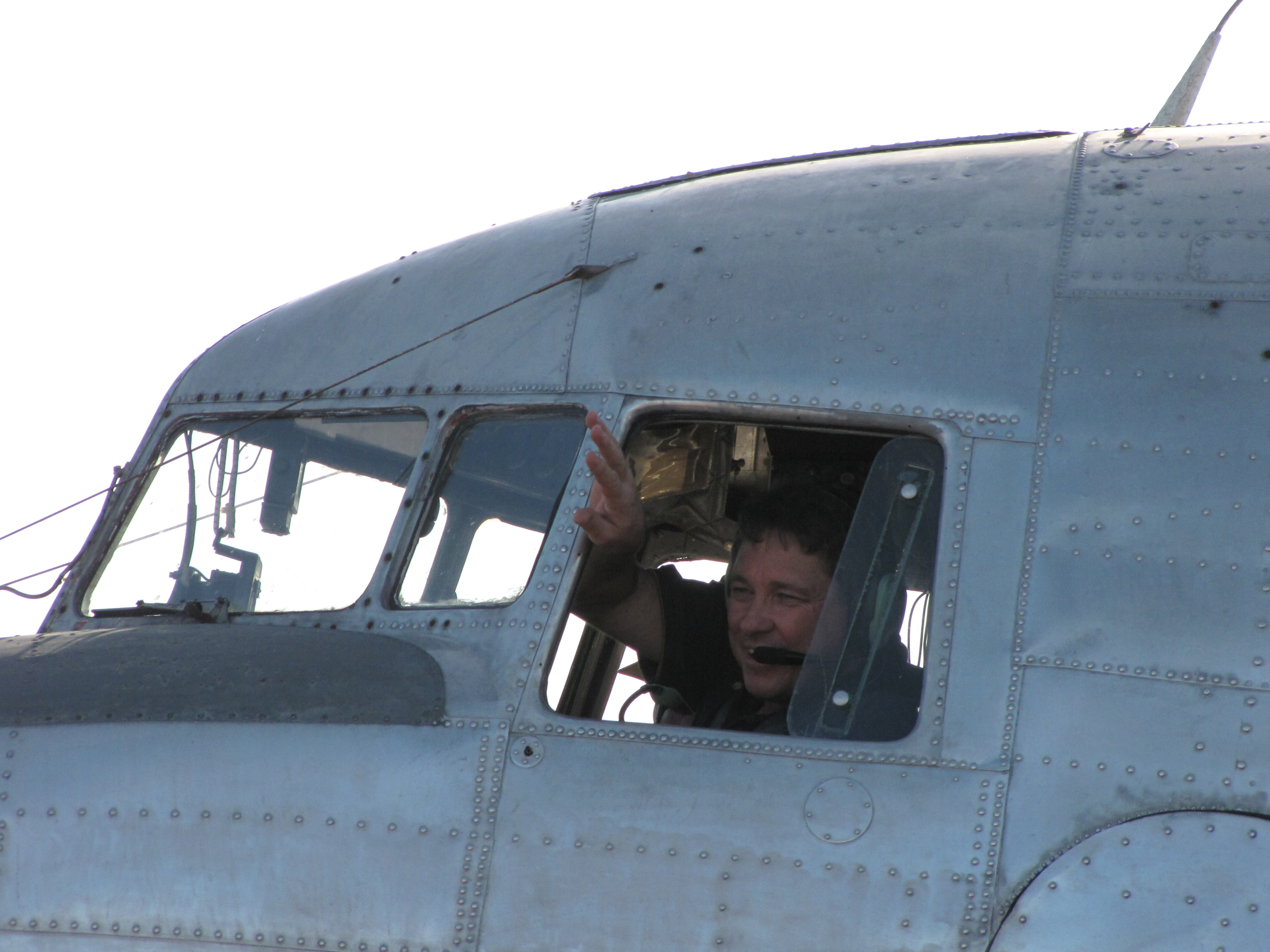
Hardy Aviation's C47 Dakota, VH-MMA, taxis after landing at the WWII Coomalie Creek airstrip for the annual Merlin Magic night.

Hardy Aviation was founded in 1991 by John Hardy.

In November 2008, Hardy Aviation created a subsidiary called Fly Tiwi.

In December 2012 Hardy Aviation and Fly Tiwi were grounded because senior pilots failed a review test. Hardy Aviation was allowed to resume operations shortly after. However, Hardy Aviation had to threaten legal action against Civil Aviation Safety Authority before Fly Tiwi could resume operations.

In 2014, Hardy Aviation constructed new facilities at Borroloola Airport, Northern Territory.

In March 2020, Hardy Aviation received financial support from the Northern Territory Government for the COVID-19 pandemic.

In April 2020, Hardy Aviation received financial support as part of the Australian Government's COVID-19 Regional Airline Network Support Program.

== Fleet ==
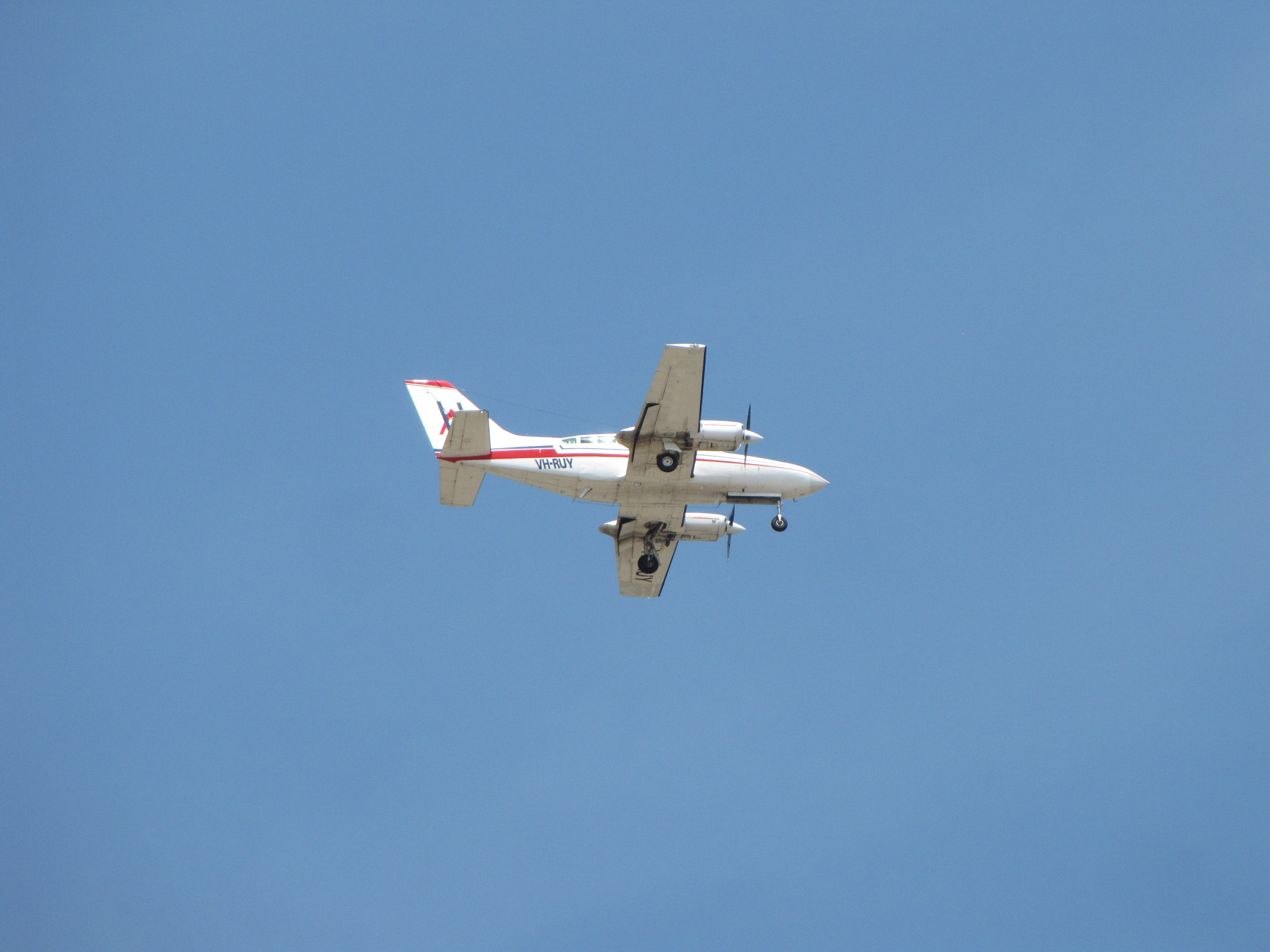
Hardy Aviation - Cessna 402C

The Hardy Aviation fleet consists of the following aircraft:

Hardy Aviation fleet
Aircraft	In service	Orders	Passengers
Cessna 206	3	—	5
Cessna 404 Titan	4	—	9
Cessna 441 Conquest II	4	—	9
Fairchild Swearingen Metroliner	2	—	19
Cessna 402	5	—	7
Cessna 210 Centurion	3	—	5
Cessna 208 Caravan	10	—	13
Total	31	0	—

== See also ==
- List of airlines of Australia
- John Hardy (aviator)
