= John Hardy (aviator) =

Australian businessman (born 1942)

The Honourable John Hardy AO
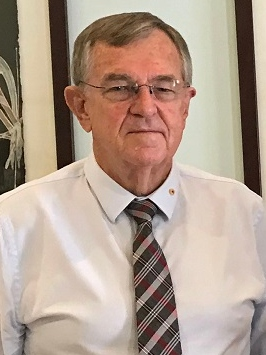
- Hardy in 2017

21st Administrator of the Northern Territory
- In office 10 November 2014 – 30 October 2017
- Governor General: Sir Peter Cosgrove
- Preceded by: Sally Thomas
- Succeeded by: Vicki O'Halloran

Personal details
- Born: 14 September 1942 (age 84) Midland, Western Australia
- Spouse: Marie Vincenette (m. 1962)
- Education: South Australian Institute of Technology
- Occupation: Aviator, radiographer

John Laurence Hardy AO (born 14 September 1942) is an Australian aviator and businessman who founded the aviation company Airnorth in 1978 and Hardy Aviation in 1991. He was Administrator of the Northern Territory from November 2014 until October 2017.

Hardy was born at Midland Junction in Perth, Western Australia, and moved at the age of six to Broken Hill, where his father, Evan, was chief metallurgist at North Broken Hill mine. He was schooled at Broken Hill High School.

He moved to the Northern Territory in 1971 to work as a pilot in the South Australian and Territory Air Services, where he flew supplies from Darwin to the Indonesian island of Ceram for the American oil giant Gulf and Western's oil field there. When aviation work was not available, Hardy worked as a radiographer at Darwin Hospital in Larrakeyah.

On 10 November 2014, Hardy was sworn in as Administrator of the Northern Territory by Governor-General Sir Peter Cosgrove.

== Honours ==
In 2012 Hardy was awarded the Medal of the Order of Australia (OAM) for service to aviation in the Northern Territory, and to the community; and in 2017 he was appointed an Officer of the Order of Australia for distinguished service to the people of the Northern Territory, and as a patron and supporter of a range of aviation, health, emergency service and charitable organisations.

Government offices
Preceded by Sally Thomas	Administrator of the Northern Territory; 2014–2017	Succeeded by Vicki O'Halloran
