= David Connolly (cattleman) =

Administrator of the Northern Territory

His Honour the Honourable David Connolly

24th Administrator of the Northern Territory
- Incumbent
- Assumed office 27 February 2026
- Governor General: Sam Mostyn
- Preceded by: Hugh Heggie

Personal details
- Born: Cunnamulla, Queensland, Australia
- Spouse: Susan Brosnan

David Connolly is an Australian cattleman who has served as the 24th Administrator of the Northern Territory since February 2026, the King's representative in the Territory. He previously served for several years as president of the NT Cattlemen's Association.

== History ==
Connolly was born in Cunnamulla, Queensland and was educated at Southport School, as a boarder, and the University of Queensland, from which he graduated with an associate diploma in stock and meat inspection and a graduate diploma of agribusiness.

His experience in the Northern Territory includes

- General Manager of the Tipperary Group of stations 2013–2024; his brother Bruce Connolly was the Farming Manager of Tipperary Station, north of Katherine. Prior to this appointment David was general manager Thames Pastoral Co., the British owners of Tanumbirini and Forrest Hill stations, both in the NT.
- President of the Northern Territory Cattlemen's Association from 2020
- Director of the National Farmers' Federation
- Managing director of the Northern Territory's first commercial cotton gin, (Note: The cotton-growing industry in the Northern Territory employs rain-grown cotton, with fibre production auxiliary to the production of cottonseed meal as a stock feed. Cotton has a similar growing profile to grain sorghum, for which Tipperary Station was originally developed.) which opened at Katherine in 2023.

== Administrator of the Northern Territory ==
On 22 December 2025, the Northern Territory Chief Minister Lia Finocchiaro announced Connolly as her pick for the position of NT administrator. In her press release, she said "He is a true cattleman, a sharp mind, and a respected leader whose life's work has been shaped by the land and the people who depend on it ... David will represent the Territory with integrity, clarity and a keen sense of purpose."

The appointment, for a position which attracts a yearly salary of $376,640, attracted criticism on account of posts he made on the social media platform X (previously Twitter), which have since been deleted. Some posts were dismissive or contemptuous of the Commonwealth government and prime minister Anthony Albanese; others were deemed insulting to Aboriginals and women. Selena Uibo, the Leader of the Opposition in the Northern Territory, questioned the Chief Minister's judgment in her selection for a position which should be above party politics and non-controversial.

He was sworn in on 27 February 2026 at Parliament House, Darwin, by the Governor-General, Sam Mostyn, and henceforth is entitled to the honorific His Honour.

In July 2026 Federal ALP politician Luke Gosling was charged with having assaulted Connolly at the NT Thailand Grand Festival held in Darwin on 18 July 2026. The allegations, which gained additional significance as Connolly was at the time acting in his capacity as Administrator, were refuted by Gosling.

== Honours ==
Knight of Grace of the Order of St John	2026 Special Honours appointment as Deputy Prior of the Venerable Order of Saint John.	12 November 2026

=== Honorary appointments ===
- 27 February 2026, upon his appointment as governor.
  - (United Kingdom) Order of St John, Deputy Prior of the Order of St John.

== Personal life ==
His wife is former Olympic rower and agricultural businesswoman Susan Brosnan.

== Notes ==
Government offices
Preceded by Hugh Heggie	Administrator of the Northern Territory; 2026–present	Incumbent
