= Elizabethan Village =

Former tourist attraction in Armadale, Western Australia

Coordinates: 32°08′30″S 116°02′11″E

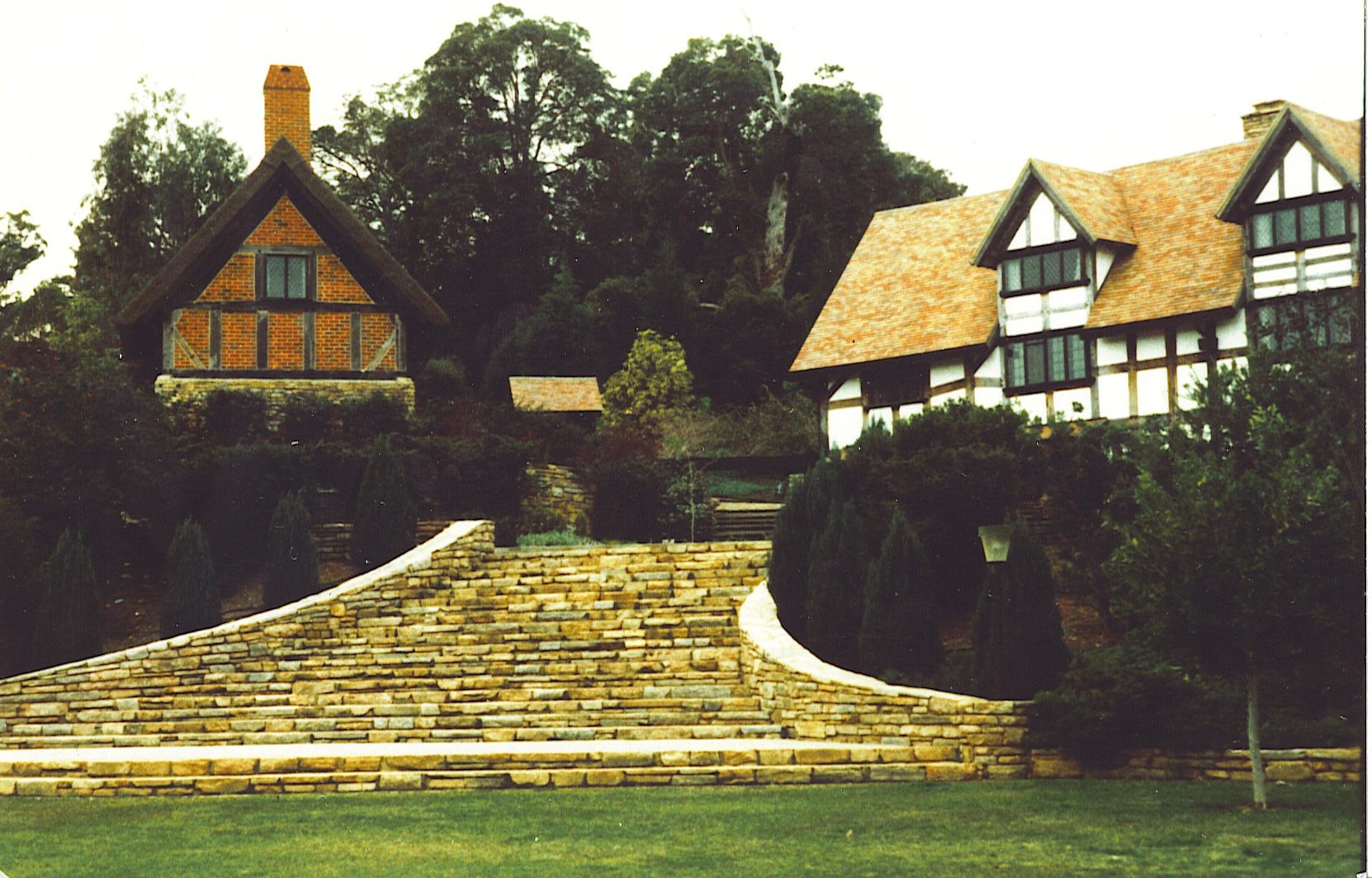
Replicas of Shakespeare's Birthplace (left) and Anne Hathaway's Cottage (right) in 2000

The Elizabethan Village was a tourist attraction at Bedfordale, Western Australia, created by British engineer Leo Fowler (1923–1992).

== History ==
It was opened in 1977 by Charles Court, the Premier of Western Australia. In 1978 it was awarded the Sir David Brand Award for Tourism.

It comprised facsimiles of several buildings from Stratford-upon-Avon including Shakespeare's Birthplace and Anne Hathaway's Cottage.

As of April 2022 some of the buildings are still in use as the Last Drop Elizabethan, formerly Elizabethan Village Pub, Cobwebs restaurant and the Leo Fowler function centre.

The village is listed as a category D municipal heritage site by the Heritage Council of Western Australia.
