= 2026 Special Honours (Australia) =

Honours awarded by the sovereign

The Special Honours Lists for Australia are announced by the Sovereign and Governor-General at any time.

Some honours are awarded by other countries where King Charles III is the Head of State, Australians receiving those honours are listed here with the relevant reference.

This list also incorporates the Mid Winters Day honours list and the Bravery honours lists.

== Order of Australia ==
Ribbon bar of the Order of Australia (General)

Ribbon bar of the Order of Australia (Military)

=== Companion of the Order of Australia (AC) ===
General

- His Excellency The Honourable Thomas Bradley – 13 November 2026 – For his appointment as Governor of Queensland.

=== Officer of the Order of Australia (AO) ===
Honorary Military

- Admiral Samuel Paparo, Hawaii, United States of America – 6 March 2026 (authorised 1 July 2026) – For distinguished service to the military alliance between Australia and the United States of America.

=== Member of the Order of Australia (AM) ===
Honorary Military

- General Randy Alan George, Colorado, United States of America – 6 March 2026 (authorised 10 May 2026) – For exceptional service in fostering and deepening the military relationship between Australia and the United States of America.

== Royal Victorian Order ==
Ribbon bar of the Royal Victorian Order

=== Lieutenant of the Royal Victorian Order (LVO) ===
- Hugh Douglas Borrowman, Official Secretary to The Governor of South Australia. Awarded as part of the 2026 Birthday Honours.

=== Member of the Royal Victorian Order (MVO) ===
- Jason Michael Baltov, Inspector, New South Wales Police Force. Awarded as part of the 2026 New Year Honours.
- Paula Anne FitzPatrick, Senior Protocol Officer, New South Wales Premier's Department. Awarded as part of the 2026 New Year Honours.

== Star of Gallantry (SG) ==
Ribbon bar of the Star of Gallantry

Australian Army

- Private John Wesley Matten – 20 August 2026 – For acts of conspicuous gallantry in action in circumstances of great peril with the 3rd Special Air Service Squadron on 18 January 1967 on operations in South Vietnam.

Royal Australian Air Force

- Pilot Officer Warren Frank Cowan, MG – 27 March 2026 – For acts of conspicuous gallantry in action in circumstances of great peril on 22 July 1942 as the aircraft captain of Lockheed Hudson A16-201. The Medal for Gallantry awarded in October 2023 for the same action has been cancelled.

== Medal for Gallantry (MG) ==
Ribbon bar of the Medal for Gallantry

Australian Army

- Sergeant Garry John Chad – 14 February 2026 – For acts of gallantry in action in hazardous circumstances with 7 Platoon, 4th Battalion, The Royal Australian Regiment in Long Khanh Province in Vietnam on 29 July 1971. The Mention in Despatches awarded in July 1972 for the same action has been cancelled
- The late Mr (then Driver) Norman Ted Nye – 14 February 2026 – For acts of gallantry in action in hazardous circumstances as a tank driver from 2/6th Armoured Regiment in World War II at Buna, New Guinea on 24 December 1942. The Mention in Despatches awarded in December 1943 for the same action has been cancelled.
- Mr (then Private) Matthew John Adams – 21 July 2026 – For acts of gallantry in action in hazardous circumstances as a Commando with the 2nd Commando Regiment on Special Operations Task Group during Operation SLIPPER.

== Bravery Medal (BM) ==
Ribbon bar of the Bravery Medal

- Silas Despréaux – 13 April 2026 – Mr Silas Despréaux displayed considerable bravery during an armed attack at Westfield Bondi Junction, Bondi, New South Wales on 13 April 2024.
- Ashlee Good – 13 April 2026 – The late Ms Ashlee Good displayed considerable bravery during an armed attack at Westfield Bondi Junction, Bondi, New South Wales on 13 April 2024.
- Damien Jean Guerot – 13 April 2026 – Mr Damien Guerot displayed considerable bravery during an armed attack at Westfield Bondi Junction, Bondi, New South Wales on 13 April 2024.
- Detective Inspector Amy Louise Scott, New South Wales Police Force – 13 April 2026 – Detective Inspector Amy Louise Scott displayed considerable bravery during an armed attack at Westfield Bondi Junction, Bondi, New South Wales on 13 April 2024.
- Muhammad Taha – 13 April 2026 – Mr Muhammad Taha displayed considerable bravery during an armed attack at Westfield Bondi Junction, Bondi, New South Wales on 13 April 2024.
- Faraz Tahir – 13 April 2026 – The late Mr Faraz Tahir displayed considerable bravery during an armed attack at Westfield Bondi Junction, Bondi, New South Wales on 13 April 2024.
- Chinges Tumurkhuyag – 1 September 2026 – Mr Chinges Tumurkhuyag displayed considerable bravery by his actions during the rescue of a woman in Cairns, Queensland on 23 November 2019.
- Xiaoyan Xi – 1 September 2026 – Ms Xiaoyan Xi displayed considerable bravery by her actions during a stabbing incident in South Hedland, Western Australia on 1 May 2020.

== Order of St John ==
Order of St John ribbon

=== Knight of the Order of St John ===
- His Honour the Honourable David Connolly – 12 November 2026

== Conspicuous Service Medal ==
Ribbon bar of the Conspicuous Service Medal

Royal Australian Air Force

- Mr (then Flight Lieutenant) Lance Richard Haslewood, OAM – 21 July 2026 – For meritorious achievement as the Senior Instructor at the Air Movement Training and Development Unit, RAAF Base, Richmond, New South Wales from 1990 to 1992.

== Australian Antarctic Medal ==
Ribbon bar of the Australian Antarctic Medal

- Shaun Christopher Gillies – 21 June 2026 – For outstanding contribution to Australia’s Antarctic program, through fostering resilient and cohesive station communities.
- Jennifer Susan McGhee – 21 June 2026 – For outstanding contribution to Australia’s Antarctic Program, through leadership in fostering safe, inclusive and resilient station communities.
- Clive Reginald McMahon – 21 June 2026 – For outstanding contribution to Australia’s Antarctic Program, in marine mammal telemetry and ocean observing systems.

== Commendation for Gallantry ==
Ribbon bar of the Commendation for Gallantry

Australian Army

- Mr (then Trooper) Chris Williams – 21 July 2026 – For acts of gallantry in action as a Patrol Scout with the Special Air Service Regiment as part of the Special Operations Task Group during Operation SLIPPER in Afghanistan.

== Commendation for Brave Conduct ==
Ribbon bar of the Commendation for Brave Conduct

- Noel McLaughlin – 13 April 2026 – Mr Noel McLaughlin is commended for brave conduct for his actions during an armed attack at Westfield Bondi Junction, Bondi, New South Wales on 13 April 2024.
- Catherine Ann Molihan – 13 April 2026 – Mrs Catherine Ann Molihan is commended for brave conduct for her actions during an armed attack at Westfield Bondi Junction, Bondi, New South Wales on 13 April 2024.
- Jeremy Scott Blythman – 1 September 2026 – Mr Jeremy Blythman is commended for brave conduct for his actions during the interception of a male offender in Chiltern, Victoria on 3 February 2025.
- Robert John Copley – 1 September 2026 – Mr Robert John Copley is commended for brave conduct for his actions during the rescue of a person from a burning vehicle in Woongarra, Queensland on 21 April 2022.
- Jonathan Paul Croft – 1 September 2026 – Mr Jonathan Croft is commended for brave conduct for his actions during the rescue of a person from a house fire in Tootgarook, Victoria on 31 December 2023.
- Jack Lawrence Daw – 1 September 2026 – Mr Jack Daw is commended for brave conduct for his actions during the rescue of an individual from a burning vehicle near Tirroan, Queensland, on 22 October 2024.
- Steven Mark Daw – 1 September 2026 – Mr Steven Daw is commended for brave conduct for his actions during the rescue of an individual from a burning vehicle near Tirroan, Queensland, on 22 October 2024.
- Giuseppe Falabella – 1 September 2026 – Mr Giuseppe Falabella is commended for brave conduct for his actions during the rescue of a person from a burning vehicle in Woongarra, Queensland on 21 April 2022.
- Konrad Frost – 1 September 2026 – Mr Konrad Frost is commended for brave conduct for his actions during a stabbing incident in South Hedland, Western Australia on 1 May 2020.
- Thomas Alan Gallaway – 1 September 2026 – Mr Thomas Gallaway is commended for brave conduct for his actions during the rescue of a person from a vehicle accident near Kyabram, Victoria on 20 February 2024.
- Russell Timothy Harrison – 1 September 2026 – Mr Russell Harrison is commended for brave conduct for his actions during an assault in Frankston, Victoria on 11 December 2015.
- James Hermiston – 1 September 2026 – Mr James Hermiston is commended for brave conduct for his actions in intercepting an armed offender in Indooroopilly, Queensland on 5 July 1999.
- Brianna Kathryn Hurst – 1 September 2026 – Ms Brianna Kathryn Hurst is commended for brave conduct for her actions during the rescue of three swimmers at Marengo Beach, Marengo, Victoria, on 17 March 2024.
- The late Mr Antong Jiang – 1 September 2026 – The late Mr Antong Jiang is commended for brave conduct for his actions attempting to rescue a distressed swimmer in Wollongong, New South Wales on 29 October 2023.
- The late Dr Luqman Khaleel Jubair – 1 September 2026 – The late Doctor Luqman Khaleel Jubair is commended for brave conduct for his actions attempting to rescue a distressed fisherman in Miami Beach, Queensland on 17 February 2022.
- Ben Matthew Kettle – 1 September 2026 – Mr Ben Matthew Kettle is commended for brave conduct for his actions during the rescue of a driver from a burning vehicle in Moresby, Queensland on 20 August 2022.
- Warrick Bruce Lee – 1 September 2026 – Mr Warrick Lee is commended for brave conduct for his actions during an armed robbery in Morphett Vale, South Australia on 18 February 2023.
- Richard Mathiasz – 1 September 2026 – Mr Richard Mathiasz is commended for brave conduct for his actions in intercepting an armed offender in Bayswater North, Victoria on 15 March 2023.
- Dr Fergus McCabe – 1 September 2026 – Dr Fergus McCabe is commended for brave conduct for his actions in restraining an armed offender in North Perth, Western Australia on 28 September 2023.
- Lachlan James Mitchell – 1 September 2026 – Mr Lachlan James Mitchell is commended for brave conduct for his actions preventing a potential suicide attempt in Morningside, Queensland on 13 September 2019.
- Darcy Ian Regan – 1 September 2026 – Mr Darcy Regan is commended for brave conduct for his actions during the rescue of a person from a vehicle accident near Kyabram, Victoria on 20 February 2024.
- Ronin Montell Rio – 1 September 2026 – Mr Ronin Rio is commended for brave conduct for his actions during a stabbing in Coomera, Queensland on 28 May 2022.
- Todd James Sellars – 1 September 2026 – Mr Todd Sellars is commended for brave conduct for his actions during the attempted rescue of six people in a seaplane crash in Jerusalem Bay, Brooklyn, New South Wales on 31 December 2017.
- Kalam Waller – 1 September 2026 – Mr Kalam Waller is commended for brave conduct for his actions during the attempted rescue of a man from a house fire in Lowood, Queensland on 11 June 2021.

== Group Bravery Citation ==
Group Bravery Citation

Members of the Australian Defence Force are recognised with the award of the Group Bravery Citation for serving with UNAMET in East Timor in 1999.

- Colonel Michael Timothy Bye
- Major Daniel John Crogan
- Colonel Andrew Nigel Duff
- Brigadier John Loughlin Gould, DSC, CSC
- David William Graham
- Major Filip Franc Likar
- Commander Ian Parker, CSM
- Major Damon Ward Reid
- Brigadier Justin Matthew Roocke
- Lieutenant Colonel John George Sholl, BM
- Major General Paul Symon, AO
- Squadron Leader Gareck Dean Wilson

The recipients are recognised with the award of the Group Bravery Citation for their actions after a shooting in Campbelltown, South Australia on 15 July 2023.

- Daniela Mariana Badea
- Ion Badea
- Maxwell Ian Charles McLean

The recipients are recognised with the award of the Group Bravery Citation for their actions in intercepting an armed offender in Indooroopilly, Queensland on 5 July 1999.

- Louise Dewar
- The late Mr Frank Donald Putland

The recipient is added to the Group Bravery Citation gazetted on 19 March 2025, for their actions in intervening and apprehending a man armed with a knife in Sydney, NSW on 13 August 2019.

- John Gerard Bamford

The recipients are recognised with the award of the Group Bravery Citation for their actions in rescuing people from a derailed commuter train near Granville, New South Wales on 18 January 1977.

- Dr Barry James Gobbe, OAM
- The late Superintendent Richard Anthony Lamb, BM
- Gary Ernest Raymond, APM, OAM

The recipients are recognised with the award of the Group Bravery Citation for their actions rescuing people from a submerged vehicle in Wyaralong Dam, Wyaralong, Queensland on 22 November 2020.

- Dr Rodney Wayne Appleby
- Mark Duane Green
- Lawson Andrew Heath

The recipients are recognised with the award of the Group Bravery Citation for their actions taken during a rescue from a shark attack, Walkers Rock Beach, Elliston, South Australia on 13 May 2023.

- Clint Adam Beard
- Jonathon Robert Beard
- Kym Michael Custance
- Lachlan Custance
- Clare Sophie Eldridge

== New Zealand ==
=== New Zealand Order of Merit ===
Ribbon bar of the New Zealand Order of Merit

==== Knight Companion of the New Zealand Order of Merit (KNZM) ====
- Scott Ronald Glyndwr Dixon, CNZM – For services to motorsport. Awarded as part of the 2026 New Year Honours (New Zealand).

==== Member of the New Zealand Order of Merit (MNZM) ====
- Leighton Smith – For services to broadcasting. Awarded as part of the 2026 New Year Honours (New Zealand).

=== New Zealand Antarctic Medal (NZAM) ===
Ribbon bar of the New Zealand Antarctic Medal

- Professor Alan Dudley Hemmings – 1 June 2026 – For services to Antarctic law and environmental protection. Awarded as part of the 2026 Birthday Honours (New Zealand).

== Papua New Guinea ==
=== Most Excellent Order of the British Empire ===
Ribbon bar of the Order of the British Empire (Civil)

==== Knight Commander of the Order of the British Empire (KBE) ====
- Robert Bates, OBE – For services to Business and to the Community. Awarded as part of the 2026 New Year Honours by Papua New Guinea

== Other ==
=== Honorary military rank ===
==== Royal Australian Navy ====
- Russell Crowe – honorary Commander – 27 February 2026 – for "enduring advocacy for the Royal Australian Navy, his contribution to public understanding through storytelling and support of the defence community."
