= East Kimberley Regional Airport =

Airport in Kununurra, Western Australia

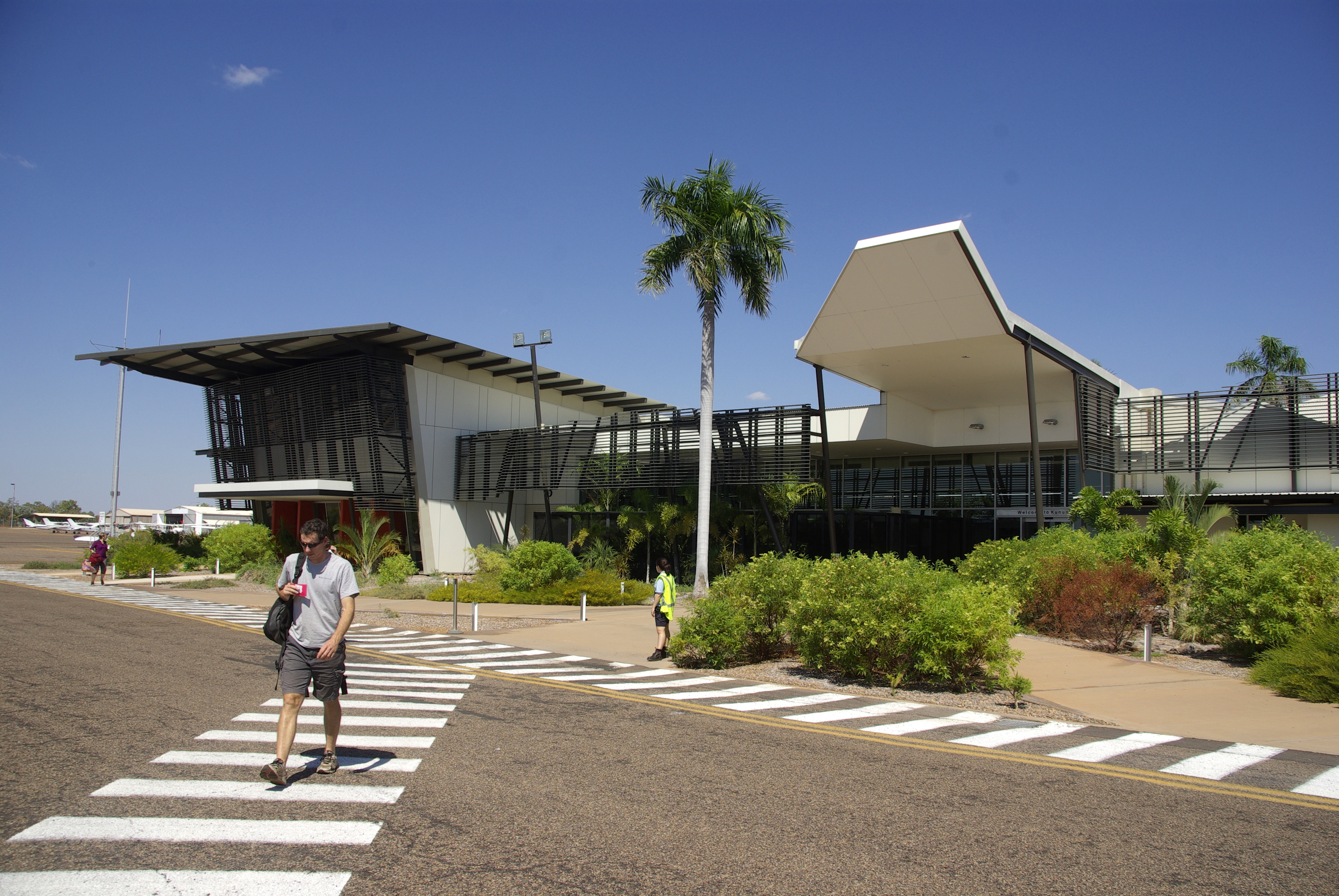
- IATA: KNX; ICAO: YPKU

Summary
- Airport type: Public
- Owner: Shire of Wyndham East-Kimberley
- Serves: Kununurra
- Location: Kununurra, Western Australia
- Elevation AMSL: 145 ft (44 m)
- Coordinates: 15°46′41″S 128°42′27″E
- Website: www.swek.wa.gov.au/airports.aspx

Map
- Location in Western Australia

Runways
Direction	Length		Surface
Direction	m	ft	Surface
12/30	1,829	6,001	Asphalt

Statistics (2010/11)
- Passengers: 86,955
- Aircraft movements: 2,779
- Sources: Australian AIP and aerodrome chart Passenger and aircraft movements from the BITRE

The East Kimberley Regional Airport (IATA: KNX, ICAO: YPKU), locally known as the Kununurra Airport, is an airport in Kununurra, Western Australia. The airport is 2 nautical miles (3.7 km; 2.3 mi) west of the town. Heavy wet seasons often result in this area being cut off from essential outside services and deliveries. The airport is a crucial piece of infrastructure which enables people and goods to enter or leave from the region and especially supports tourism and economic development.

In 2012, a major expansion of the airport was completed and opened to the public. Costing about AUD$8.68 million, it effectively doubled the size of the facility. This now includes a dedicated arrivals hall with baggage carousel, enlarged check-in area and improved security for the enlarged departure lounge.

== Airlines and destinations ==
Airlines	Destinations
Airnorth	Broome, Darwin; Seasonal: Perth
Alliance Airlines	Perth
Aviair	Balgo, Halls Creek, Kalumburu
Virgin Australia	Perth

=== Charter airlines ===
- Aviair
- Helispirit
- Kimberley Air Tours
- Shoal Air

Due to the long distances involved in traveling across the Kimberley region, several air-tours are offered by various charter airlines not based in Kununurra, hopping across the north-west of Australia. Occasionally connecting some major eastern Australian cities directly with Kununurra and with some bus tour companies too, to avoid lengthy transfers in Darwin or Perth.

== Statistics ==
Kununurra Airport was ranked 47th in Australia for the number of revenue passengers served in financial year 2010–2011.

Annual passenger and aircraft statistics for Kununurra Airport
Year	Revenue passengers	Aircraft movements
2001–02	37,134	2,200
2002–03	37,160	2,671
2003–04	40,239	2,625
2004–05	48,051	2,681
2005–06	50,901	2,556
2006–07	60,680	3,048
2007–08	69,483	2,817
2008–09	74,742	2,488
2009–10	81,933	2,514
2010–11	86,955	2,779
2011–12	91,459	2,257
2012–13	91,992	2,428
2013–14	86,279	2,250
2014–15	77,407	2,192
2015–16	74,334	2,170
2016–17	71,190	2,119
2017–18	69,599	1,991
2018–19	77,072	2,043

== New terminal ==
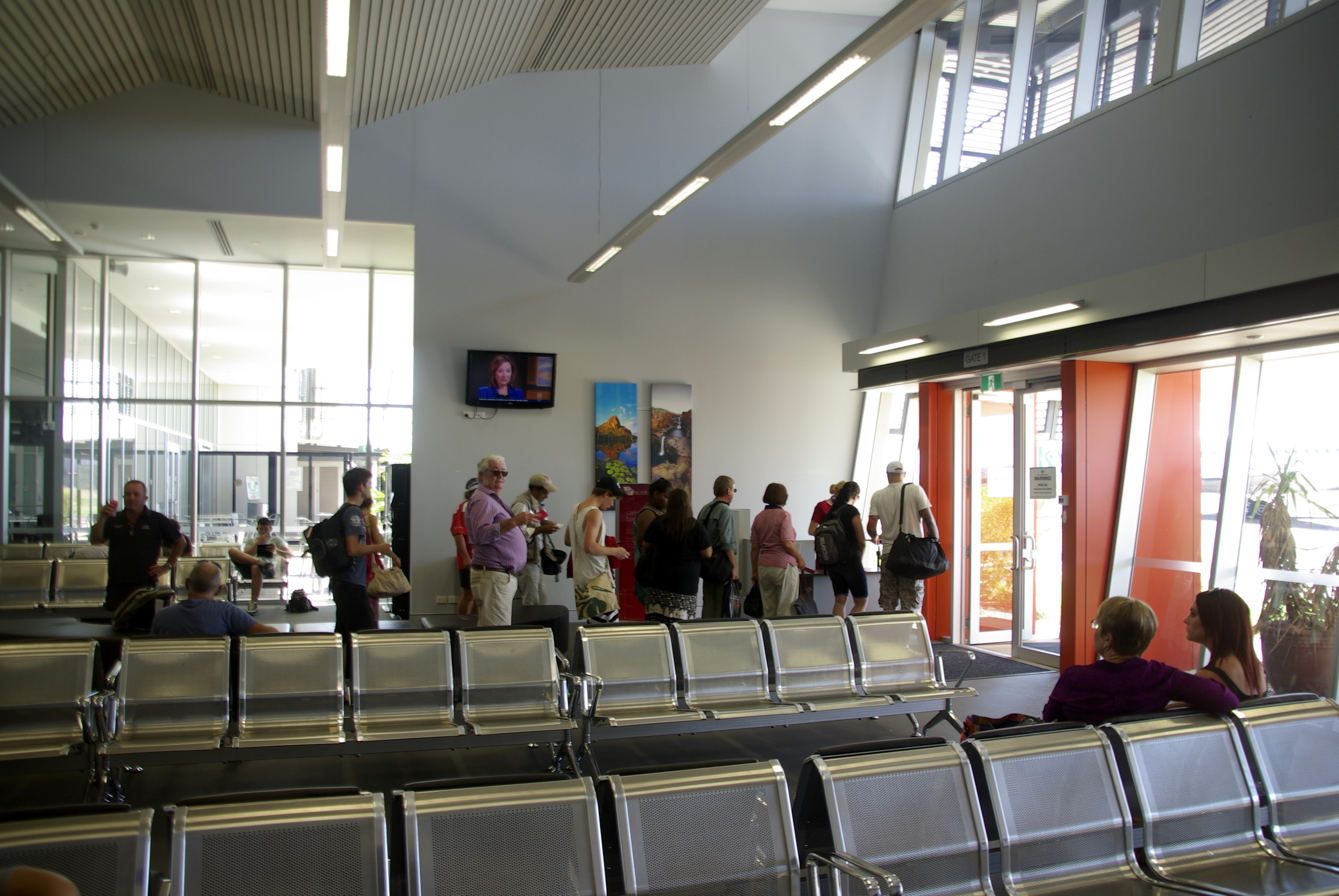
East Kimberly Regional Airport (Kununurra) departure lounge

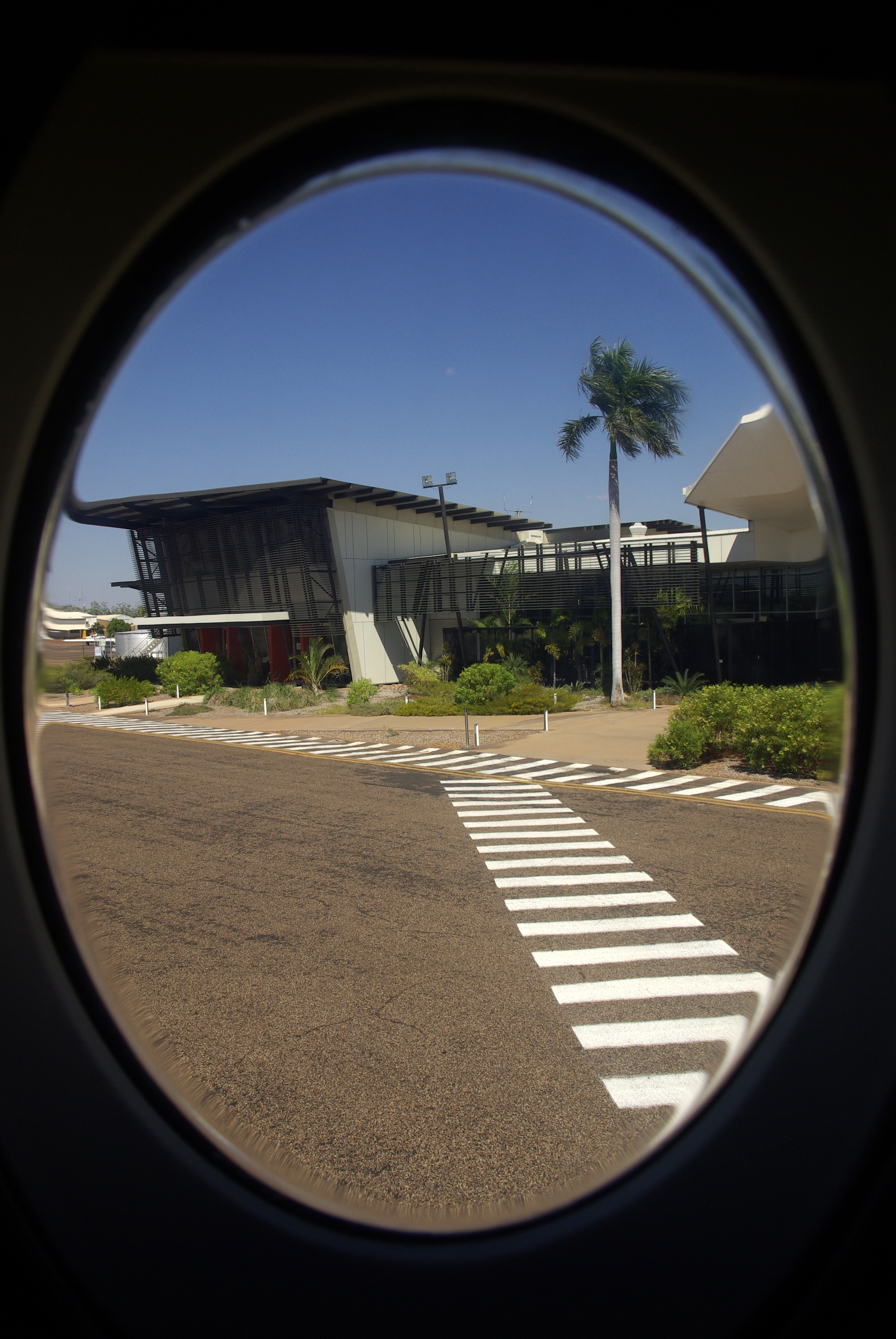
View of East Kimberly Regional Airport (Kununurra) from the window of a Virgin Australia Fokker 100

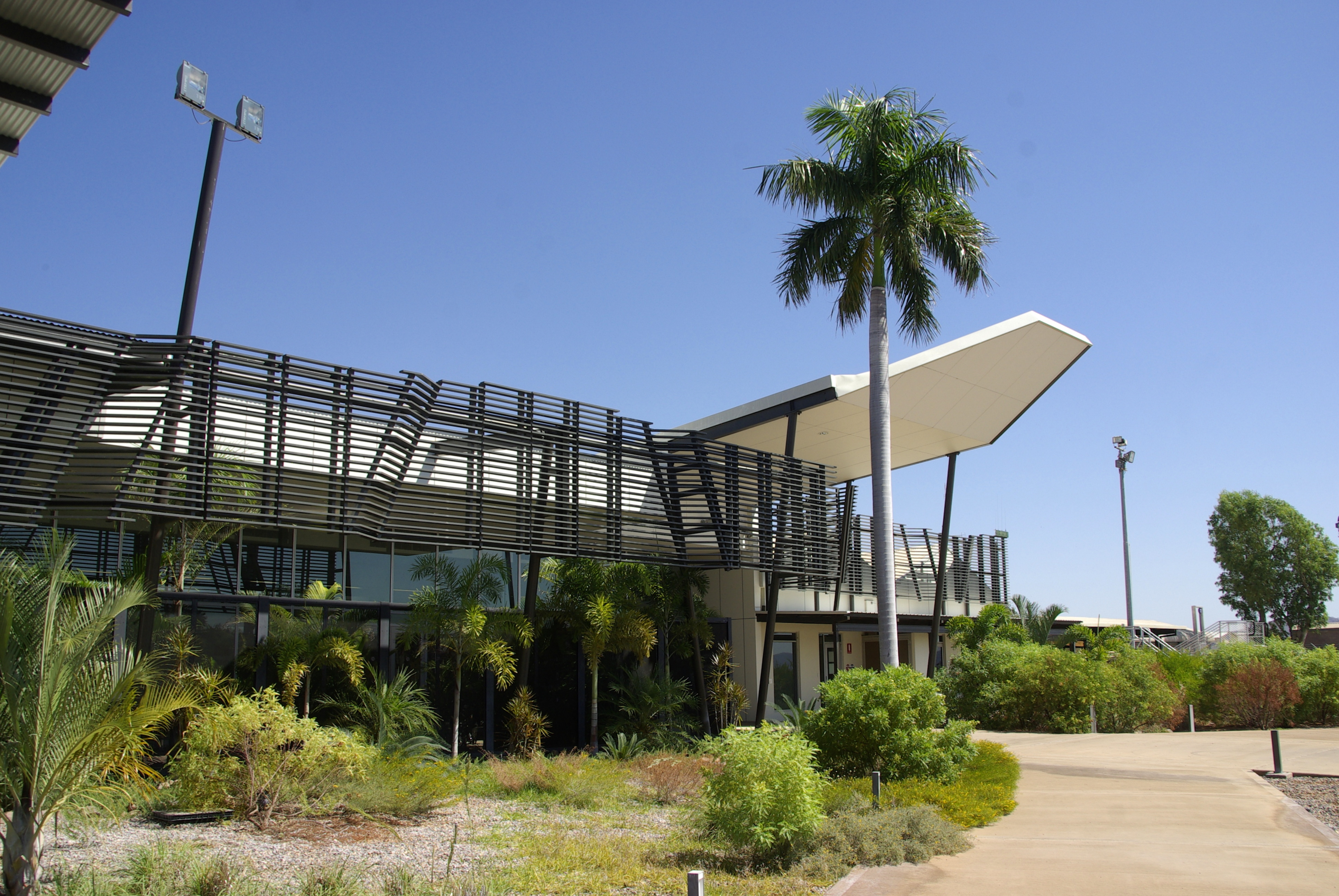
Airside view of East Kimberly Regional Airport (Kununurra)

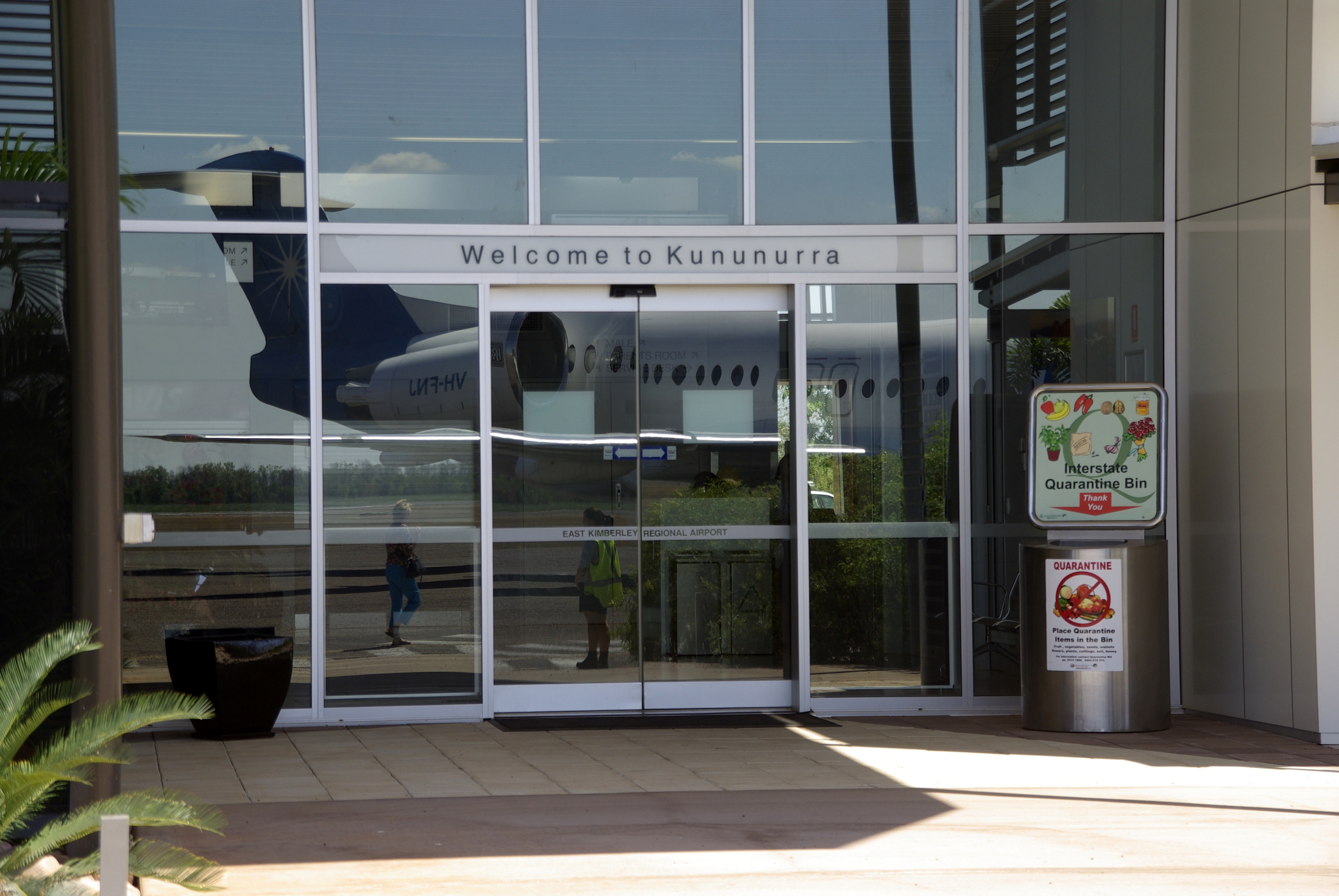
Arrivals gate at East Kimberley Regional Airport

== Old terminal ==
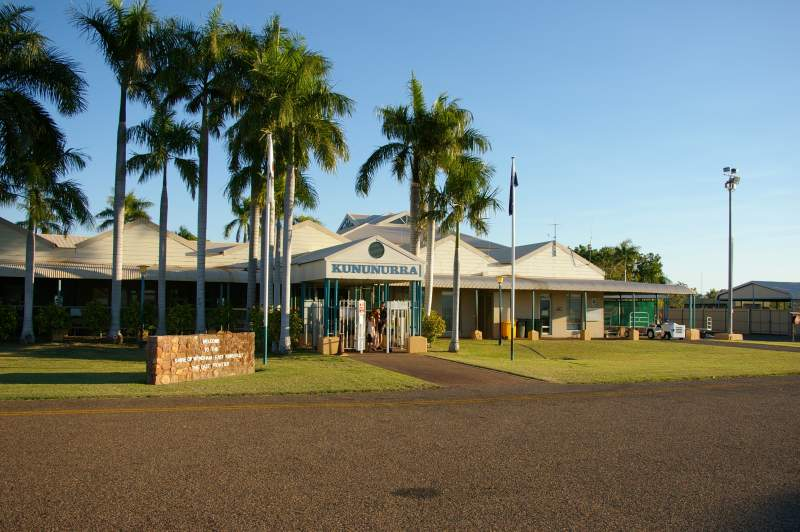
Former terminal building before the 2011–12 expansion works

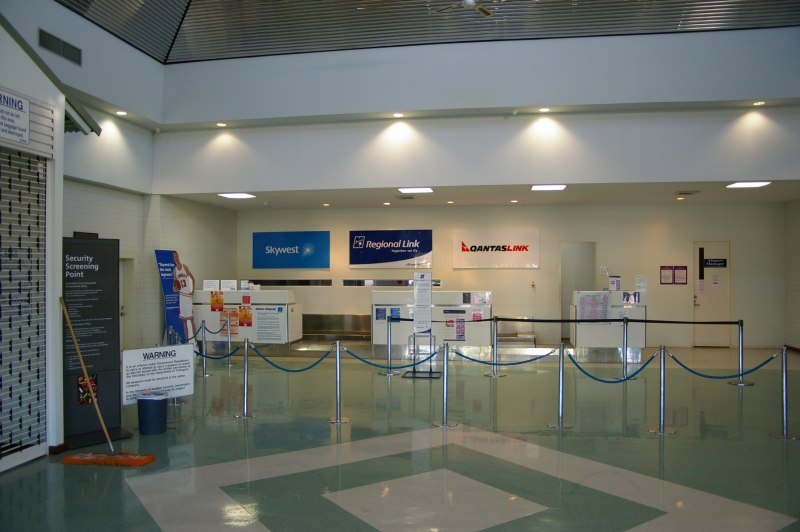
Inside the former terminal building

== See also ==
- List of airports in Western Australia
- Aviation transport in Australia
