= Sir David Brand Award =

Tourism award in Western Australia

The Sir David Brand Award for Tourism is the highest award for tourism in Western Australia, named after Sir David Brand (1912-1979), who was Premier of Western Australia from 1959 to 1971. It was established in 1972 as a single award, and is now the highest honour in the Western Australia Tourism Awards.

The awards were established in 1972, by John Wood, founder of the Fleetwood caravan company. He said later:

I recall an excited David Brand, WA's first Minister for Tourism, saying the award would come to symbolise the pinnacle achievement in WA tourism. How insightful his vision!

Speaking in parliament in 2013 John Day commented that David Brand's widow Lady Brand, then aged 92, had at that time attended all but one of the 41 presentation ceremonies for the award.

== Winners ==
- 2019: Busselton Jetty
- 2018: Kimberley Wild Expeditions
- 2017: Horizontal Falls Seaplane Adventures
- 2016: ADAMS Coachlines
- 2015: Sandalford Wines
- 2014: Broome's Cable Beach Club Resort & Spa
- 2013: Kings Park and Botanic Garden
- 2012: Challenger Institute of Technology, School of Hospitality & Tourism
- 2011: Eco Beach Broome
- 2010: Willie Creek Pearl Farm
- 2009: Augusta Margaret River Tourism Association
- 2008: Augusta Margaret River Tourism Association
- 2006: Willie Creek Pearl Farm
- 2001: Perth Zoo
- 1998: Aviair
- 1997: Aviair
- 1996: Aviair
- 1994: Feature Tours
- 1993: The Burswood Resort
- 1992: Esplanade Hotel, Albany
- 1984: York Motor Museum
- 1983: Atlantis Marine Park (closed 1990)
- 1978: Elizabethan Village
