= Hugh Heggie =

Administrator of the Northern Territory from 2023 to 2026

The Honourable Hugh Heggie AO PSM
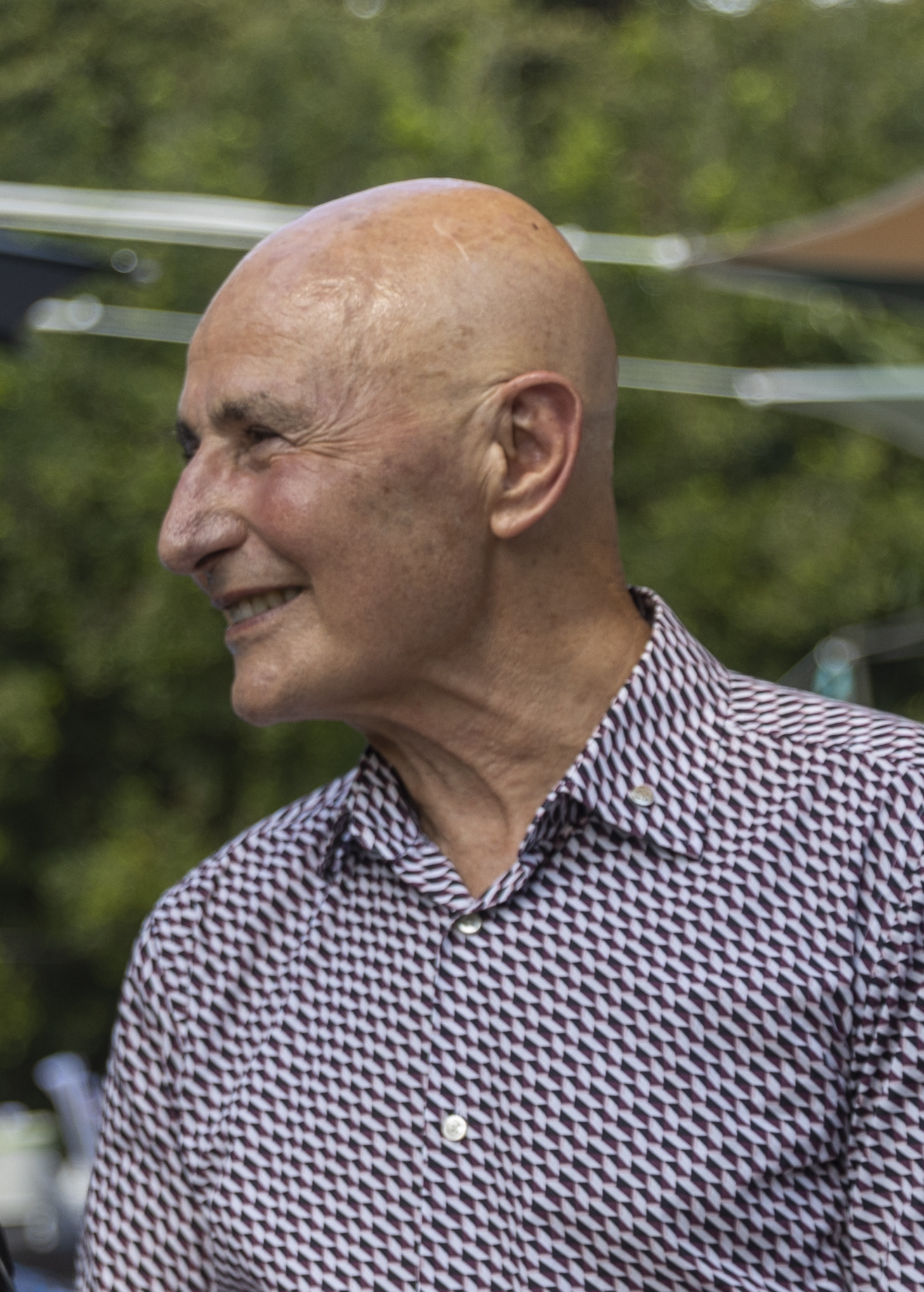

23rd Administrator of the Northern Territory
- In office 2 February 2023 – 30 January 2026
- Governors General: David Hurley; Sam Mostyn
- Preceded by: Vicki O'Halloran
- Succeeded by: David Connolly

Personal details
- Born: Hugh Crosbie Heggie; 1950 (age 75–76) Melbourne, Victoria, Australia
- Spouse: Ruth Jones (m. 2016)
- Education: University of Melbourne

Hugh Crosbie Heggie AO PSM (born 1950) is an Australian public servant and physician who served as the 23rd Administrator of the Northern Territory from 2 February 2023 to 30 January 2026.

== Career ==
Heggie was born in Melbourne, Victoria in 1950, and educated at Bonbeach High School. He attended the University of Melbourne and graduated with a Bachelor of Medicine and Bachelor of Surgery. On the completion of his first degree he relocated to Sydney where he worked as a research pharmacologist before returning to Melbourne. In 2001, after 20 years in Melbourne, he relocated to the Northern Territory with his family.

Between 2016 and 2022, Heggie served as the Chief Health Officer and executive director of Public Health and Clinical Excellence in the Northern Territory. He played a significant role during the COVID-19 restrictions in Australia and served on numerous boards, committees and councils locally and nationally.

On 29 November 2022, chief minister Natasha Fyles announced Heggie would become the 23rd Administrator of the Northern Territory, succeeding Vicki O'Halloran. He was sworn in by Governor-General David Hurley on 2 February 2023.

In April 2025, Heggie apparently made a comment supporting the Labor Party in the upcoming federal election despite having a "non-partisan" role.

== Honours ==
| Officer of the Order of Australia (AO) | 2024 Australia Day Honours for "distinguished service to medicine and medical research organisations, and as Administrator of the Northern Territory" | 26 January 2024 |
| Public Service Medal (PSM) | 2021 Australia Day Honours for "outstanding public service to community health in the Northern Territory" | 26 January 2021 |
| Knight of Grace of the Order of St John | 2023 Special Honours appointment as Deputy Prior of the Venerable Order of Saint John. | 5 February 2023 |
| Humanitarian Overseas Service Medal | with Vanuatu clasp. | 2021 |

=== Honorary appointments ===
- Australian Army 2023: Honorary, Colonel of North West Mobile Force
- Royal Australian Air Force 2023: Honorary, Air Commodore of No. 13 Squadron RAAF
- Royal Australian Air Force 2023: Honorary, Air Commodore of No. 17 Squadron RAAF

Government offices
| Preceded by Vicki O'Halloran | Administrator of the Northern Territory; 2023–2026 | Succeeded by David Connolly |
