= Derby Airport (Western Australia) =

- IATA: DRB; ICAO: YDBY

Summary
- Airport type: Public
- Operator: Shire of Derby/West Kimberley
- Location: Derby, Western Australia
- Elevation AMSL: 24 ft / 7 m
- Coordinates: 17°22′19″S 123°39′45″E

Map
- Location in Western Australia

Runways
Direction	Length		Surface
Direction	m	ft	Surface
11/29	1,736	5,696
05/23	1,158	3,799	Gravel/asphalt
- Sources: Australian AIP and aerodrome chart

Derby Airport (IATA: DRB, ICAO: YDBY) is located 5 nautical miles (9.3 km; 5.8 mi) southeast of Derby, Western Australia.

== History ==
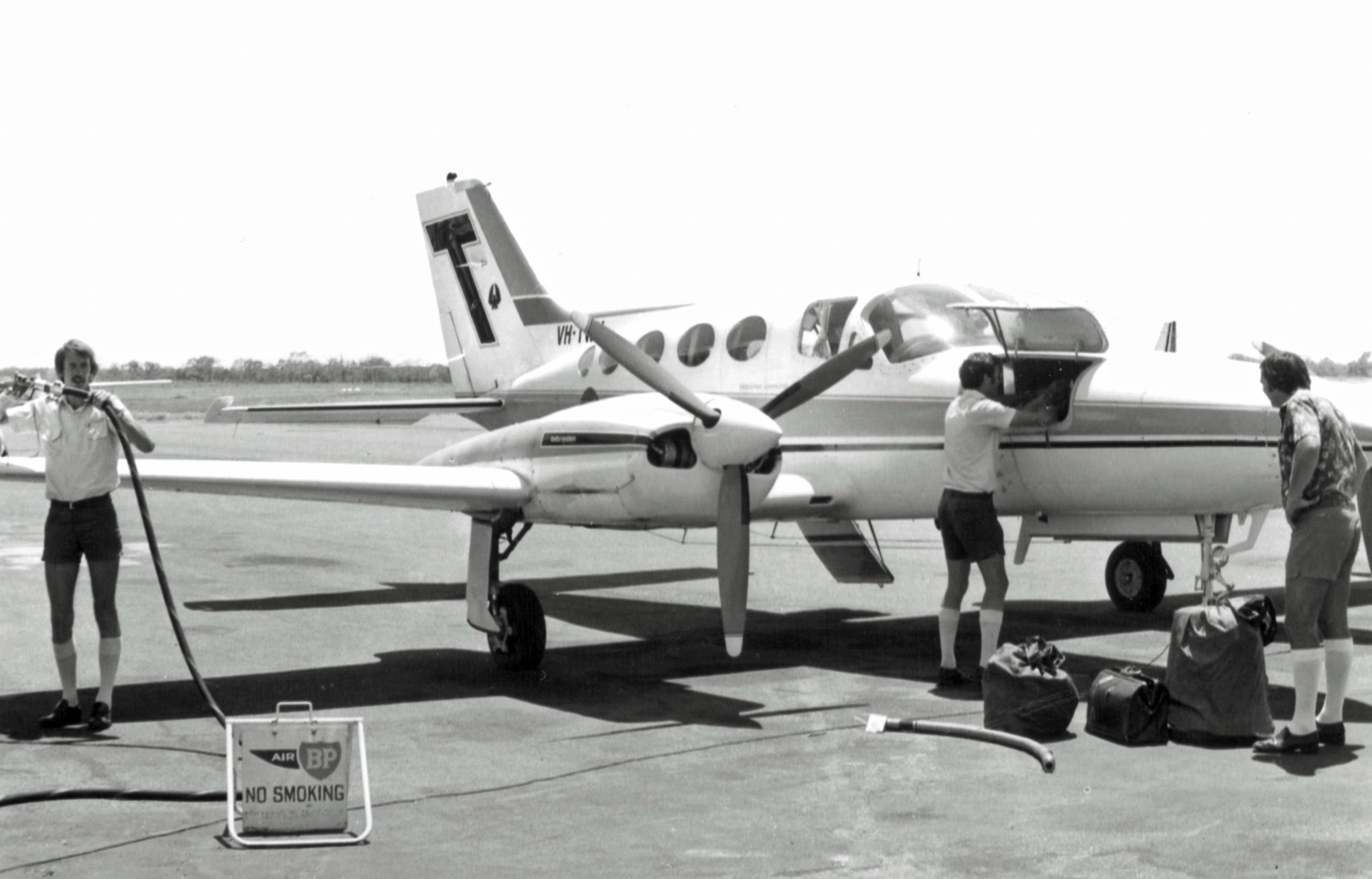
A Transwest Airlines aircraft refueling at Derby Airport in 1979

The site of Derby airport was first set aside for aviation uses in 1922. The airfield played a key role in the search for Charles Kingsford Smith's Southern Cross following a forced landing in the Kimberley region during 1929 in an incident that would become known as the "Coffee Royal Affair". Aviation pioneer Norman Brearley used aircraft of his West Australian Airways in the initial search effort flying outwards from Derby.

In 1938, it was proposed that Derby to be used as a base for flying boat services carried air mail from London to Australia via Egypt and Ceylon (Sri Lanka).

== See also ==
- Curtin Airport, nearby military base which hosted commercial passenger flights to Derby
- List of airports in Western Australia
- Aviation transport in Australia
