= Vicki O'Halloran =

Administrator of the Northern Territory from 2017 to 2023

The Honourable Vicki O'Halloran AO CVO
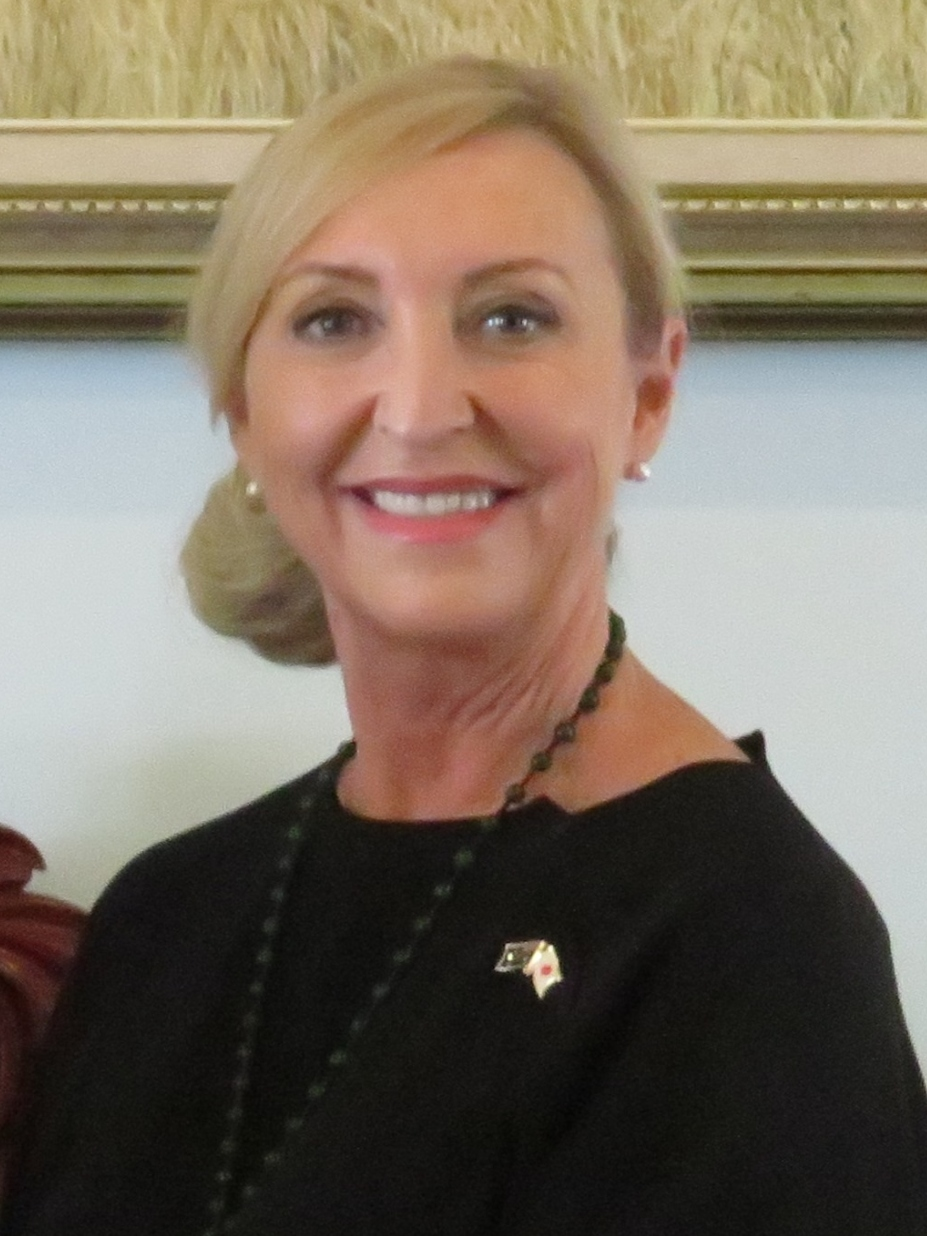
- O'Halloran in 2019

22nd Administrator of the Northern Territory
- In office 31 October 2017 – 30 January 2023
- Governors General: Sir Peter Cosgrove (2017–19); David Hurley (2019–23)
- Preceded by: John Hardy
- Succeeded by: Hugh Heggie

Personal details
- Born: Vicki Susan Cuttriss; 20 June 1964 (age 62) Burnie, Tasmania, Australia
- Spouse: Craig O'Halloran (m. 1993)
- Education: Charles Darwin University

Vicki Susan O'Halloran AO CVO (born 20 June 1964) is an Australian businesswoman and community worker, who was CEO of Somerville Community Services in the Northern Territory from 1998 to 2017. On 31 October 2017, she was sworn in as the 22nd administrator of the Northern Territory, replacing John Hardy.

O'Halloran was born in Burnie, Tasmania, and educated at Smithton High School and Devonport Community College. She worked as an education officer and child care director for Circular Head Council, before moving to Darwin, Northern Territory in 1989 where she studied for a Bachelor of Children's Services at Charles Darwin University. In 1993, she joined Somerville Community Services, as deputy CEO and manager, and became CEO in 1998.

In 2014, O'Halloran was made a Member of the Order of Australia for significant service to people with a disability through roles with a range of organisations, and to the community. She was subsequently advanced to Officer of the Order of Australia in the 2019 Queen's Birthday Honours for distinguished service to the people of the Northern Territory, and to the disability sector through a range of executive roles. She was appointed Commander of the Royal Victorian Order (CVO) in the 2023 New Year Honours.

Government offices
Preceded by John Hardy	Administrator of the Northern Territory; 2017–2023	Succeeded by Hugh Heggie
