= Regional Aviation Association of Australia =

Non-profit organisation

- Regional Aviation Association of Australia
- Founded: 1980; 46 years ago
- Location: Kingston ACT, Australia
- Origins: Regional Airline Association of Australia
- Services: Air Transportation
- Chairman: Malcolm Sharp
- Vice Chairman: Lee Schofield
- Vice Chairman and TWG Chairman: Mark Wardrop
- Finance Chairman: Daniel Bowden
- Board of directors: Mr Stuart Richter, Mr Jim Davis, Mr Carl Jepsen, Mr Neville Evans, Mr Shane Lawrey

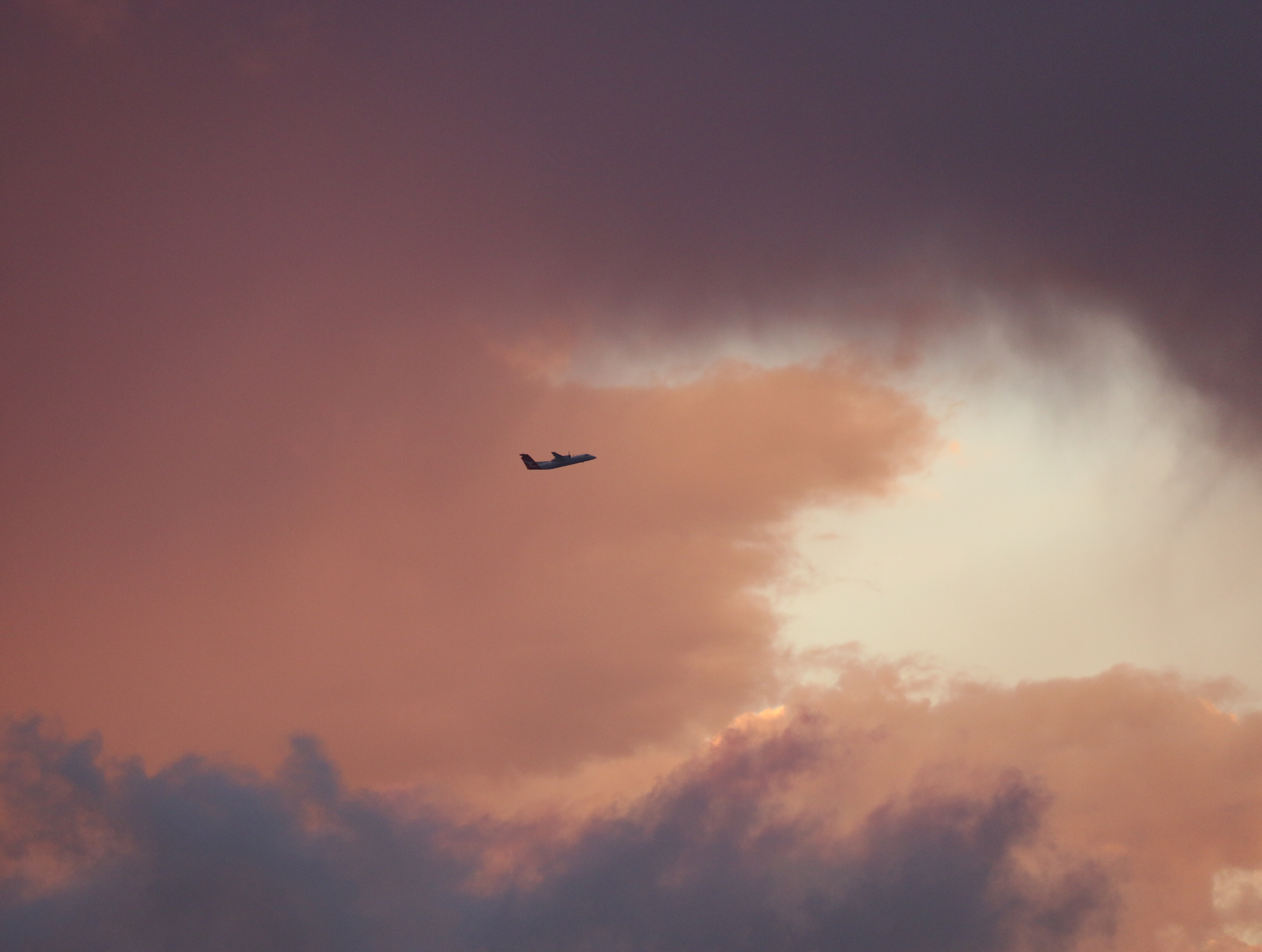
Plane

The Regional Aviation Association of Australia (RAAA) is a non-profit organisation representing the interests of regional aviation in Australia. RAAA has approximately 100 members and 2500 employees. They Provide air transportation in Australia for more than 2 million passengers and 23 million kilograms cargo per year.

It was formed in 1980 as the Regional Airline Association of Australia and amended its name in 2001 when its charter was widened to include "aerial work operators" as well as regional airlines and air charter companies "and the businesses that support them". The members of Regional Aviation Association of Australia include "airlines, airports, engineering and flight training companies, finance and insurance companies and government entities". Thomas Global System's CEO Angus Hutchinson stated "The RAAA plays a fundamental role in supporting the Australian aviation industry and linking regional communities and remote areas across Australia."

The Charter of Regional Aviation Association of Australia is to promote a safe and viable region aviation industry, to achieve this goal, RAAA require:

• promotes the regional aviation industry and its benefits to Australian transport, tourism and the economy among government and regulatory policy makers;

• lobbies on behalf of the regional aviation industry and its members;

• contributes to government and regulatory authority policy processes and formulation to enable its members to have input into policies and decisions that may affect their businesses;

• encourages high standards of professional conduct by its members; and

• provides a forum for formal and informal professional development and information sharing.

== Member directory ==
The membership of the association is accessible to any organization that is able to actively participate in or support the regional aviation industry.

There are four levels of membership, they are (a) Ordinary Members; (b) Associate Members; (c) Affiliate Members; (d) Honorary Members.

Of which Ordinary Member is open to all organizations holding an Air Operator Certificate (AOC) including:

• Aeromedical operators,

• Airline Operators,

• Charter Operators,

• Air Freight Operators,

• Flying Schools,

• Other aerial work requires an Air Operator Certificate. RAAA allows all organizations, other than Air Operator Certificate holders, that demonstrate participation in the regional aviation industry to become Associate members, including: RAAA allows all organizations, other than Air Operator Certificate holders, or person does not intention to be an Ordinary Member, that demonstrate participation in the regional aviation industry to become Associate Members, including:

RAAA allows all organizations, other than Air Operator Certificate holders, or person does not intention to be an Ordinary Member, that demonstrate participation in the regional aviation industry to become Associate Members, including:

• Airports,

• Consultants,

• Engine and Airframe Manufacturers and Distributors,

• Equipment and Spare Parts Suppliers,

• Financiers,

• Fuel and Oil Manufacturers and Distributors,

• Insurers,

• Law Firms,

• Maintenance Organizations,

• Some Government Agencies,

• Trade Journals

• Training Organizations. The Affiliate Member of Regional Aviation Association status is open to person other than Air Operator Certificate holders and associate members who remain directly or indirectly involved in or with the Australian Aviation Industry, including:

The Affiliate Member of Regional Aviation Association status is open to person other than Air Operator Certificate holders and associate members who remain directly or indirectly involved in or with the Australian Aviation Industry, including:

• Government Departments,

• Shire Councils,

• Other similar bodies.

The Honorary Members of Regional Aviation Association of Australia status is open to persons who could provide exceptional service to regional aviation industry or association.

Thomas Global System announced its membership in Regional Aviation Association of Australia on July 21, 2015. Thomas Global System provides products and designs for aerospace and defense, they are leading position in the innovation and production of electronic systems. The CEO of the Thomas Global System Angus Hutchinson believes that the Regional Aviation Association of Australia is the foundation of the Australian aviation industry and connects remote areas of Australia. He also believes that Thomas Global System work with Regional Aviation Association of Australia could achieve better air safety and operational practices.

== The Australian Aviation Association Forums ==
Regional Aviation Association of Australia provides broad representation for the regional aviation industry through direct lobbying of ministers and senior officials, through submissions to parliament, personal contacts, and ongoing and active participation in several advisory forums.

The Australian Aviation Associations Forum is a coalition of Australia's leading aviation associations. The aim is to ensure the industry has a unified voice with the government on key aviation issues and policies. It is characterized by expertise and representation of a wide range of people and organizations committed to aviation. Participants in the forum represented most airline operators: aircraft owners, service providers, supporters and participants.

== Major conferences and reforms ==
=== General meeting ===
The annual general meeting is between 30 September and 31 December. The exact time and place are decided by the board of directors. The meeting notice of the annual general meeting will be sent to the members of Regional Aviation Association of Australia by fax or email at least 28 days before the meeting.

Meetings other than annual general meeting are called Extraordinary General Meeting. The Extraordinary General Meeting shall be held within 21 days after the joint request of at least five members. The content of the application must be clearly stated and legitimate. The meeting notice of the Extraordinary General Meeting will be sent to the members of Regional Aviation Association of Australia by fax post or email at least 7 days before the meeting.

The Regional Aviation Association of Australia had canceled the annual general meeting in 2020 as the COVID-19 risk.

=== Technical working group ===
The Regional Aviation Association of Australia Technical Working Group (TWG) is a regular meeting event where Regional Aviation Association of Australia's members discuss issues affecting the aviation industry. It aims to define, review, and find solutions to common issues that are encountered from a management and operation perspective. The technical working group is responsible for advising the chairman, directors of NASA, flight operations, maintenance, and safety standards.

Regional Aviation Association of Australia technical working groups are also allowed to create sub-working groups to study some specific areas. Each sub-working group must be chaired by the board member of Regional Aviation Association of Australia. The sub-committee has the right to nominate a coordinator to provide expertise in a specific area with the approval of the Regional Aviation Association of Australia Board.

=== Regulatory Services and Surveillance Transformation Initiative ===
The Regulatory Services and Surveillance Transformation Plan was developed in 2019. It is regarding Regional Aviation Association of Australia 's entry control and surveillance program, which aims to change the management style to a more targeted and simplified approach. The plan provides a new aviation policy that all decisions should be made by the command center. It also uses the program to review all "on- board" activities carried out by Regional Aviation Association of Australia 's intelligence agencies to maintain Australia's aviation safety record and attention to the some risks and passenger safety.

=== National Runway Safety Group ===
Regional Aviation Association of Australia is a member of the National Runway Safety Group. The National Runway Safety Group is a working group cooperate with transportation and aviation industry to improve the safety performance and runway safety in Australia.

== Events ==
=== Early Career Pilot Attributes Study ===
Regional Aviation Association of Australia has launched Early Career Pilot Attributes Study to attract and retain pilots in the early stage. In 2014, Regional Aviation Association of Australia further cooperated with universities to provide technical and non- technical air transport training and understanding some shortcomings of Australia's professional aviation training program to provide appropriate guidance from an industry perspective. The event was facilitated by the Regional Aviation Association of Australia Training and Education Committee (TEC) and its members. This study provides insight into both technical and non-technical attributes of aviation managers for early career pilots.

=== Appeal For government assistance Under Covid-19 ===
The Australian Regional Aviation Association encourages the Government to seek further emergency financial assistance for aviation organizations affected by the current lockdown and travel restrictions (RCA). As a result, the Michael McCormack as Deputy Prime Minister of Federal Government has agreed to provide $198 million in route subsidies to regional airlines, aimed at providing reduced services to regional communities at risk of losing their current scheduled service, and an additional $100 million in direct financial support to smaller airlines facing collapse.

The Federal Government of Australia released the new Aviation Recovery Framework on 20 December 2021. Its aim is to recover the aviation industry damaged by the epidemic, which also means that the aviation industry has a potential role in economic recovery. After the release of the New Aviation Recovery Framework, the CEO of Regional Aviation Association of Australia Steven Campbell said that the funds were used for Regional Airline Network Support program, and 15 million was used for remote airstrip upgrades and 6.6 million was used for remote air services scheme.

=== New regional roadshow series ===
In 2020, due to the restriction of COVID-19, the annual general meeting of Regional Aviation Association of Australia cannot be held normally. Instead, regional roadshows will be held, including aspects of convention and some aspects of technical working group.

In March 2021, more than 80 members of the Regional Aviation Association of Australia (RAAA) gathered in Mildura for a two-day roadshow series. This is the Regional Aviation Association of Australia's first regional roadshow to replace the organization's usual annual meeting. The event was supported by the City Council's Activity Grant and support Recovery Fund. The main aim is to discuss the latest situation on COVID-19 impacts and recovery of the aviation industry, including the Ministry of Infrastructure Transport, Regional Development and Communications.

In December 2021, Regional Aviation Association of Australia announced they cooperate with AMDA to conduct the roadshow and aviation showcase across Australia. Both sides believe that this cooperation will achieve a win-win outcome and make the value of regional aviation in Australia even more significant. The regional aviation showcase cooperate with AMDA will be conducted during 28 February 2023 to 5 March 2023.

== Scholarship ==
Due to the high barrier of the aviation industry, it usually takes a lot of time and funds to enter this industry and maintain skill in the later stages. RAAA and sponsors offer the Scholarships for qualified pilots and technical trainees. The sponsors include Ansett Aviation Training, Avsuper, JSSI, Hawker Pacific and MFS.

== Challenge ==
The degree of attention by the government and various parties to regional airline is a severe challenge to the Regional Aviation Association of Australia. Some issues need to work together with the government to be solved more effectively. The CEO of Regional Aviation Association of Australia Paul Tyrrell said that even though regional airlines are important part of the Australian aviation industry, it still feels the neglect of the government and opposition, and many transportation policies could not help regional airline.

As Australia's population grows and more migrants onboards, the demand for domestic aviation in Australia will become greater in the future. At the same time, these problems also cause pressure on infrastructure. As the Asia-Pacific region with the most flights in the world, the supply of aviation will be much lower than the demand, more investment in the aviation industry in the future has also become a challenge.

The COVID-19 pandemic has wreaked a severe toll on the aviation industry. Even though the Australian government provided financial support to Australian Regional Airline, the future remains a concern. Australia's border blockade during the pandemic left many international students without entry, and these prospective pilots had to transfer their study destinations to other countries, such as the United States or European countries, which could create a shortage of future pilots in Australia.

The chairman of Regional Aviation Association of Australia Jim Davis in the context of COVID-19 epidemic said

"Many important regional aviation businesses including tourist operators and flying schools that provide essential services will not survive. "

== Controversy ==
Airlines and other airport users have expressed concern that airport operators are privately controlled monopolies with little regard for the welfare of airport users and communities. As a result, Regional Aviation Association of Australia members have had a largely negative experience with airports since privatization, except for a few regional airports. Due to the Regional Aviation Association of Australia's considerable influence in the Australian aviation industry, they have seen the inappropriate use of market power to raise their prices to a relatively high level and no competitors can compete with them, and lack of adequate consideration of operational needs including security issues. Low level of security, comfort and negotiating power relate to leasehold.

Regional Aviation Association of Australia supports the statement under “ Air Services and Facilities ” Part III A that the scope of "Air services and Facilities" needs to be expanded from the current definition to include all services and facilities essential to the operation of civil aviation services, including aircraft maintenance and cargo operations. The inappropriate use of market forces by airports adversely affects the investment and long-term future viability of regional aviation, and thus adversely affects regional communities. Regional Aviation Association of Australia encourages the commission to conduct a "regional aviation" survey to investigate these and other pressing issues such as skills shortages.
