= Richard Greene (disambiguation) =

Richard Greene (1918–1985) was a British film and television actor.

Richard Greene may also refer to:

- H. Richard Greene, American actor
- Richard Greene (colonist) (died 1622), first Governor of Wessagusset Colony in New England
- Richard Greene (antiquary) (1716–1793), English antiquary and collector of curiosities
- Richard J. Greene (1924–2007), Canadian politician
- Richard Greene (musician) (born 1942), American violinist
- Richard Greene (politician) (born 1950), Irish politician
- Richard Greene (journalist) (born 1954), journalist and author who created and hosted Air America's show Clout
- Richard Greene (writer) (born 1961), Canadian poet
- Richard D. Greene (1950–2012), Chief Judge of the Kansas Court of Appeals
- Richard Plunket Greene (1901–1978), English racing driver, jazz musician, and author
- Richard Ward Greene (1792–1875), attorney
- Richard Wilson Greene (1791–1861), Irish judge
- Richard Greene, pastor of God's Ark of Safety
- Richard Greene, singer and songwriter for American a cappella group The Bobs

== See also ==
- Rick Greene (born 1971), Major League Baseball relief pitcher
- Richard Green (disambiguation)
