= Shakespeare's Birthplace =

Restored house in Stratford-upon-Avon, England

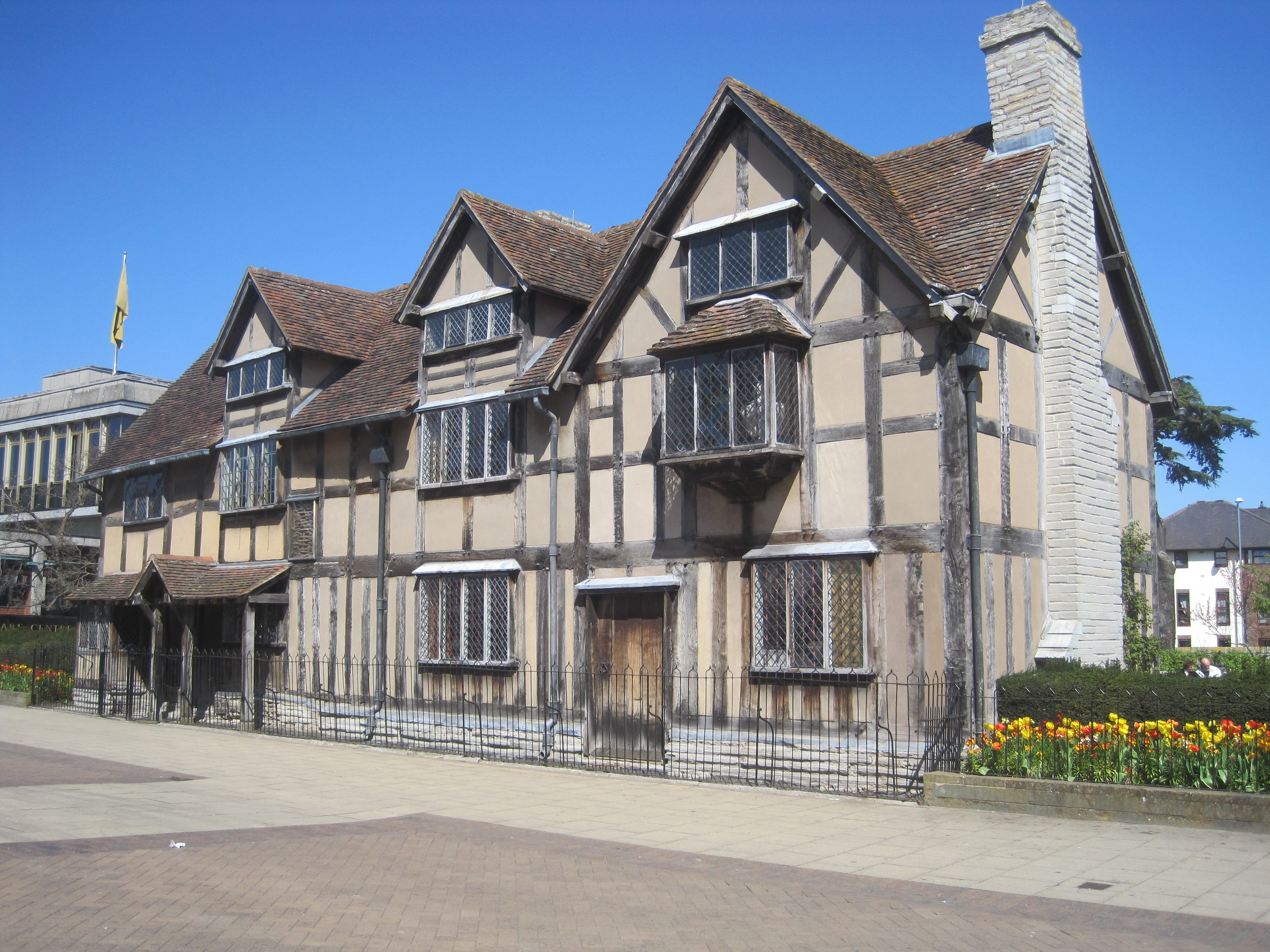
- Shakespeare's Birthplace in 2010
- Interactive map of Shakespeare's Birthplace
- 52.1939°N 1.7080°W
- Location: Henley Street, Stratford-upon-Avon, Warwickshire, England

History
- Built: before 1552
- Original use: House

Site notes
- Architectural style: Half-timbered
- Current use: Museum
- Owner: Shakespeare Birthplace Trust
- Website: www.shakespeare.org.uk/content/view/47/47/

Listed Building – Grade I
- Official name: Shakespeare's Birthplace
- Designated: 25 October 1951
- Reference no.: 1187807

Shakespeare's Birthplace is a restored 16th-century half-timbered house situated on Henley Street, Stratford-upon-Avon, Warwickshire, England, where it is believed that William Shakespeare was born in 1564 and spent his childhood years. It is now a small museum open to the public and a popular visitor attraction, owned and managed by the Shakespeare Birthplace Trust. It has been a Grade I listed building since 25 October 1951.

== Description ==
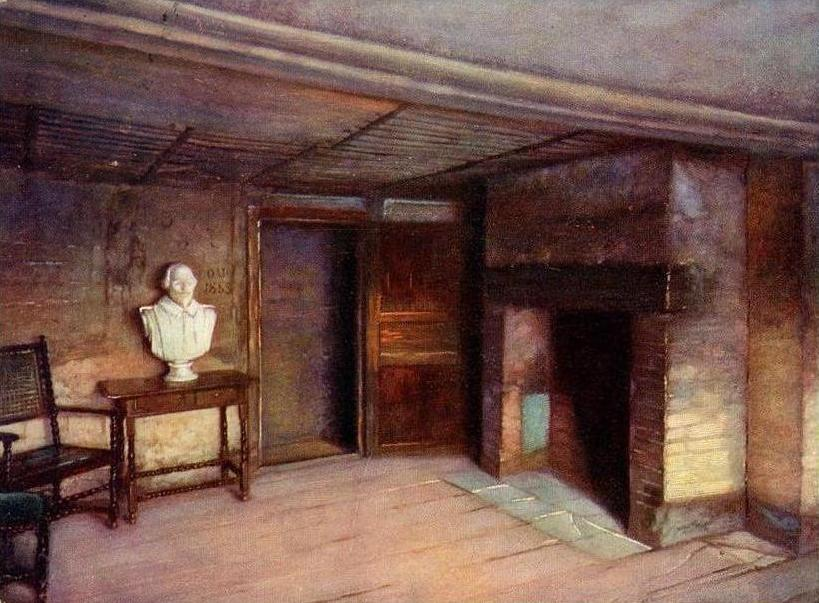
The second-story room in which Shakespeare is thought to have been born. Unknown artist, 1903.

The house itself is relatively simple, but for the late 16th century it would have been considered quite a substantial dwelling. John Shakespeare, William's father, was a glove maker and wool dealer, and the house was originally divided in two parts to allow him to carry out his business from the same premises.

The building is not outstanding architecturally, and typical of the times was constructed in wattle and daub around a wooden frame. Local oak from the Forest of Arden and blue-grey stone from Wilmcote were used in its construction, while the large fireplaces were made from an unusual combination of early brick and stone, and the ground-floor level has stone-flagged floors. There is a framed panel on the building exterior above and to the right of the porch roof showing exposed construction wattle.

The plan of the building was originally a simple rectangle. From north-west to south-east, the ground-floor consisted of a parlour with fireplace, an adjoining hall with a large open hearth, a cross passage, and finally a room which probably served as John Shakespeare's workshop. This arrangement was mirrored on the first-floor by three chambers accessed by a staircase from the hall, probably where the present stairs are sited. Traditionally, the chamber over the parlour is the birthroom. A separate single-bay house, now known as Joan Hart's Cottage, was later built onto the north-west end of the house, and the present kitchen was added at the rear with a chamber above it.

== History ==
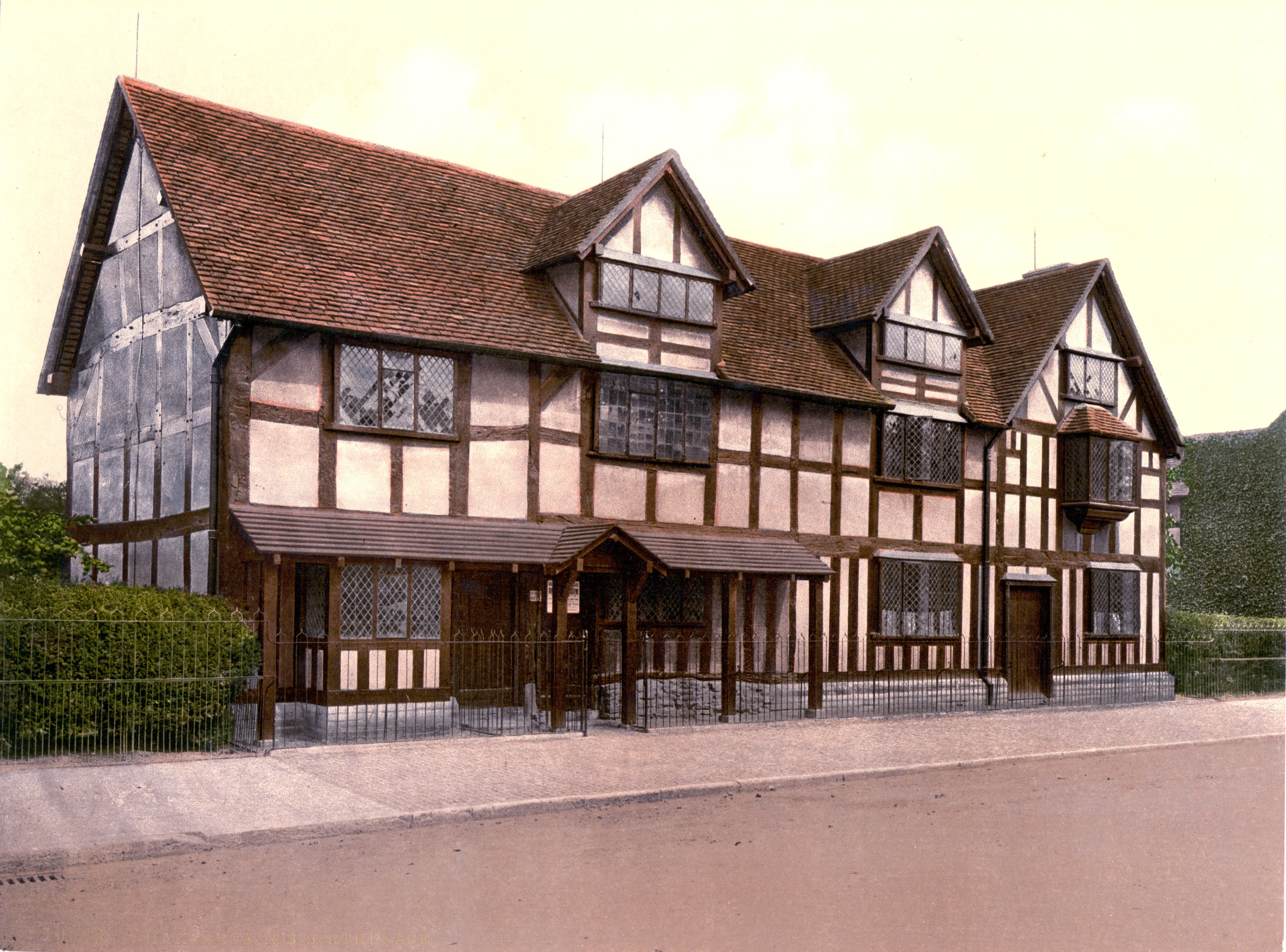
Shakespeare's Birthplace (as seen between 1890 and 1905)

There are differing views concerning the origin of the building, which possibly dates back to the 15th century, but more likely was built in the mid-16th century.

Records show that in 1552 John Shakespeare was fined for leaving a pile of muck outside his home in Henley Street, suggesting that he could have resided in a house there at the time. In Jephson's account of Shakespeare's time in Stratford he states that at the time of Shakespeare's birth his father was renting the property and that ten years later he was able to purchase two freehold houses in Henley Street. The house remained in the family until it was handed down for the final time to William Shakespeare's daughter and, given that he was born in 1564, it is fairly certain that he was born and brought up there.

The house in about 1903

=== Ownership ===
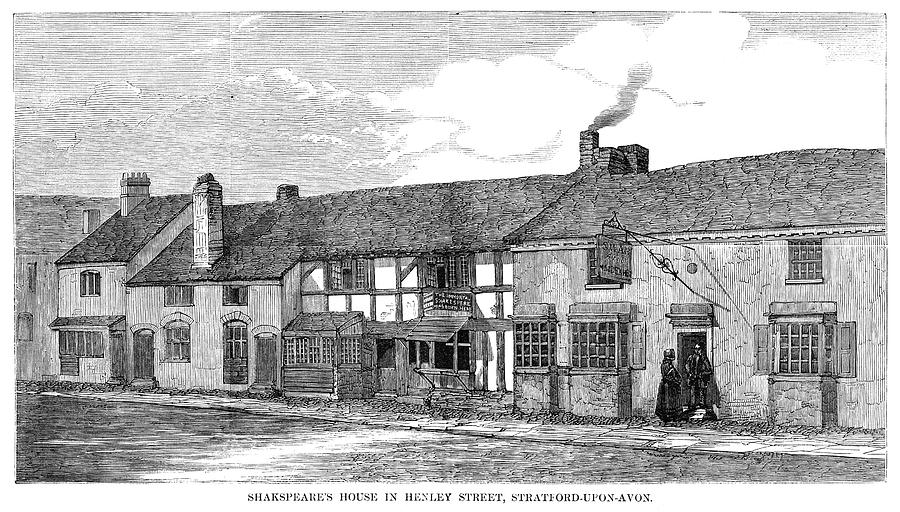
Shakespeare's birthplace as it appeared in 1847 before restoration. Engraved by W. J. Linton after a drawing by Edward Duncan.

The ownership of the premises passed to William on John Shakespeare's death. However, by that time William already owned New Place in Stratford and had no need for the Henley Street premises as a home for himself or his family. Consequently, the main house was leased to Lewis Hiccox, who converted it into an inn known as the Maidenhead (later the Swan and Maidenhead Inn), and the small, one-bay house to the north-west was put to residential use. By the time of Shakespeare's death in 1616 it was occupied by Joan Hart, his recently widowed sister.

Under the terms of Shakespeare's will, the ownership of the whole property (the inn and Joan Hart's cottage) passed to his elder daughter, Susanna. In 1649 it passed to her only child, Elizabeth, and then in 1670 to Thomas Hart. Hart was the descendant of Shakespeare's sister, Joan, whose family had continued as tenants of the smaller house after her death in 1646. The entire property remained in the ownership of the Harts until 1806, when it was sold to a butcher, Thomas Court, who also took over the running of the Swan and Maidenhead Inn. The smaller house remained occupied by Thomas Hornby, another butcher, to whom the Harts had let it when they moved away from Stratford in the 1790s. Mrs Hornby continued as a tenant and custodian of Shakespeare's Birthplace until her rent was increased in 1820.

=== Acquisition ===
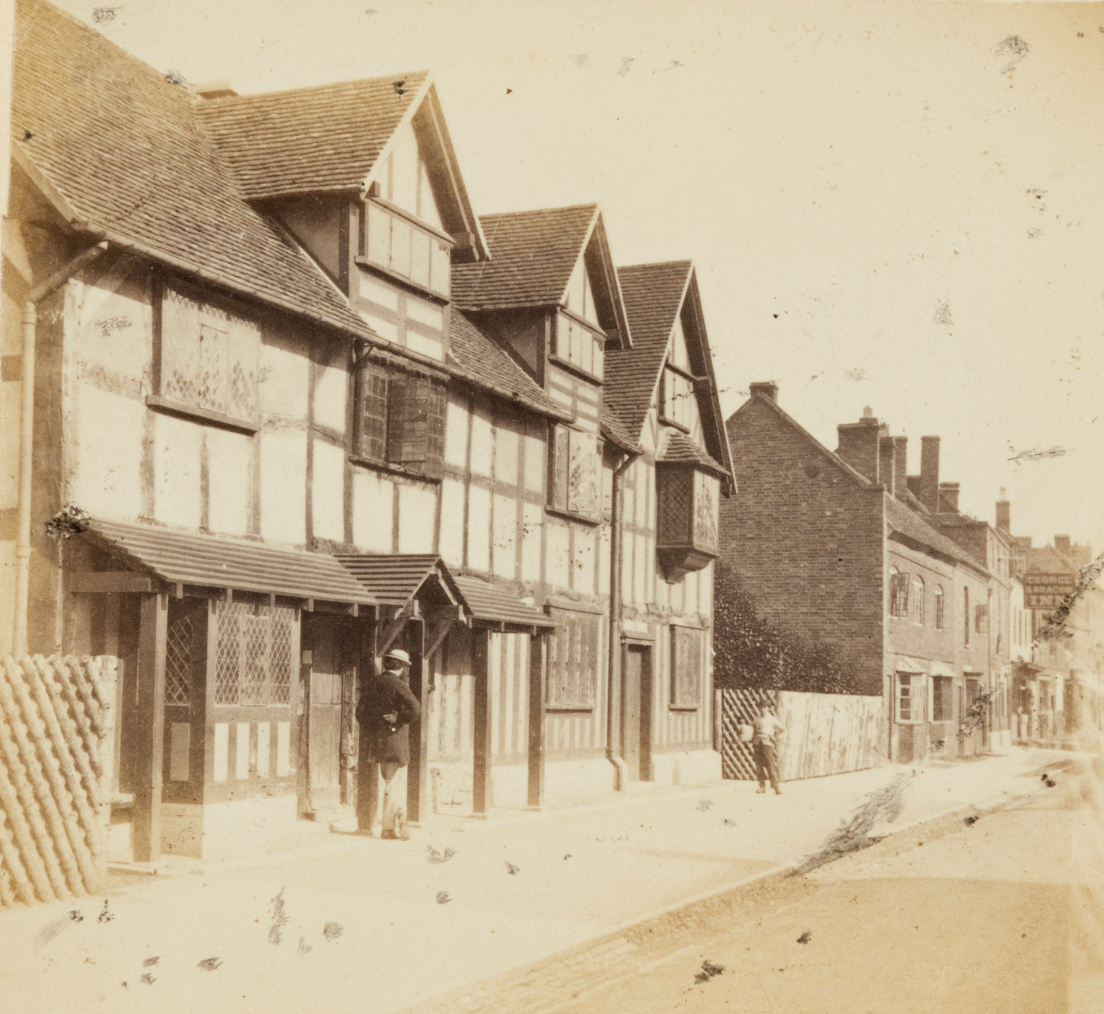
Shakespeare's birthplace, Henley Street, Stratford On Avon, Ernest Edwards, 1863, from Jephson, J., & Edwards, E. (1864). Shakespere, his birthplace, home, and grave.

Once the family line had come to an end, the house was allowed to fall into a state of disrepair until a rekindling of interest in the 18th century. Isaac Watts, Charles Dickens, Sir Walter Scott and Thomas Carlyle were among the notables that visited the birthplace and autographed the walls and windows. Many of the signatures still remain on the windowpanes around the house, although the signed walls have long since been painted over. A guest registry book includes the signatures of Lord Byron, Alfred, Lord Tennyson, John Keats, and William Thackeray.

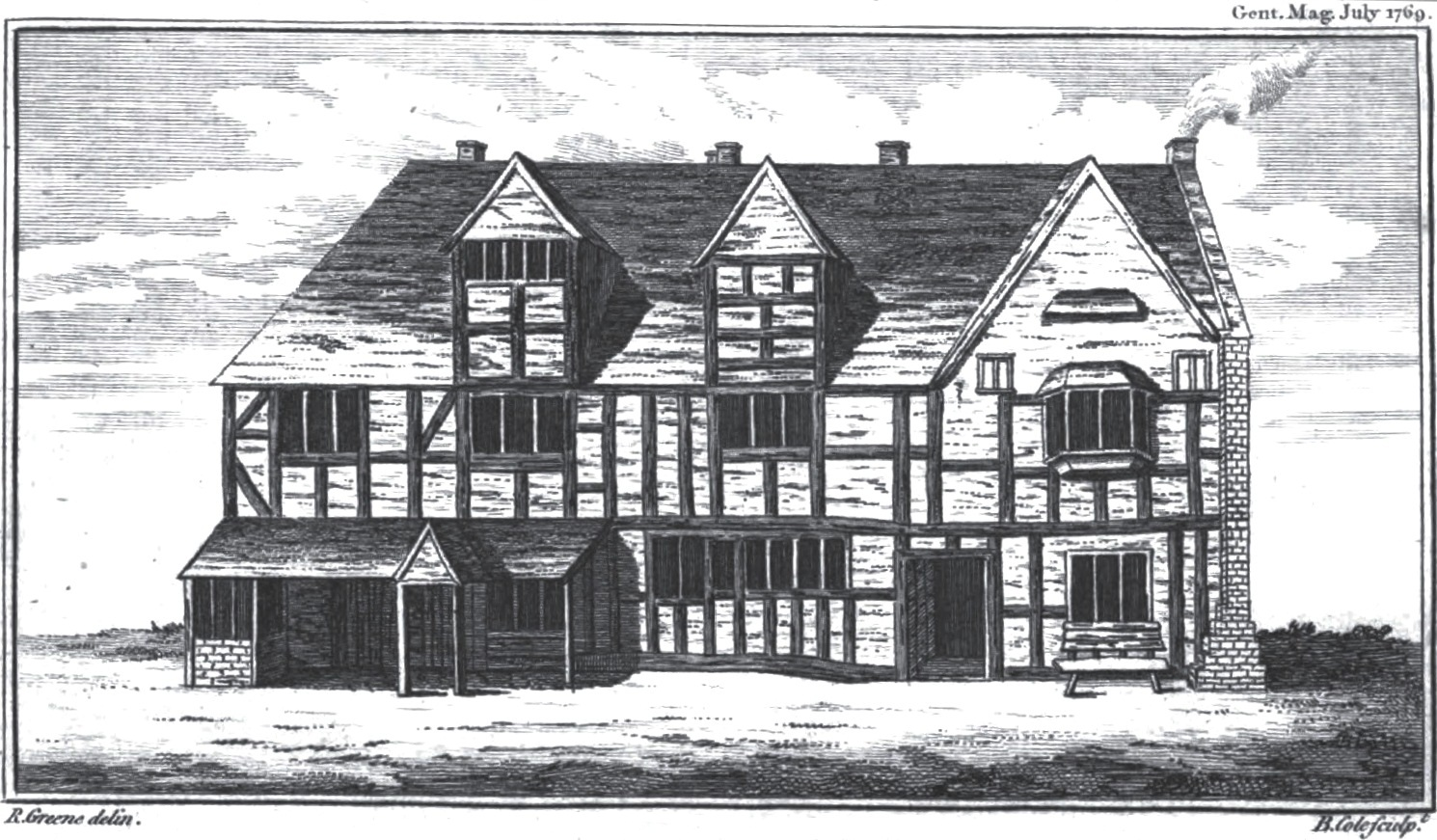
The restoration was based upon this engraving, first published in The Gentleman's Magazine in July 1769. Benjamin Cole engraving after a drawing by Richard Greene.

Interest in the property again increased when the whole premises were put up for sale on the death of Court's widow in 1846. The American showman P. T. Barnum proposed to buy the home and ship it "brick-by-brick" to the US. In response, the Shakespeare Birthday Committee (becoming the Shakespeare Birthplace Trust by a local act of Parliament) was established and, with the help of donors including Dickens, the committee raised the necessary £3,000 and bought it the following year.

=== Restoration ===
Once the committee (Trust) had acquired the building, restoration work was able to proceed. Originally the Birthplace formed part of a terrace with later houses built either side, and the first stage in its conservation was their destruction, thought necessary to avoid the risk of any fire spreading from them to the Birthplace.

Old photographs reveal that early in the 19th century, part of the front of the Birthplace was faced with brick. This was an economical alternative to the common practice of replacing timber-framed buildings and rebuilding in brick in 18th century England. Referring to an engraving of 1769 as well as taking into account surviving architectural evidence, a reconstruction carried out by the Trust between 1857 and 1864 restored the outside of the building to its 16th century state.

== Present day ==
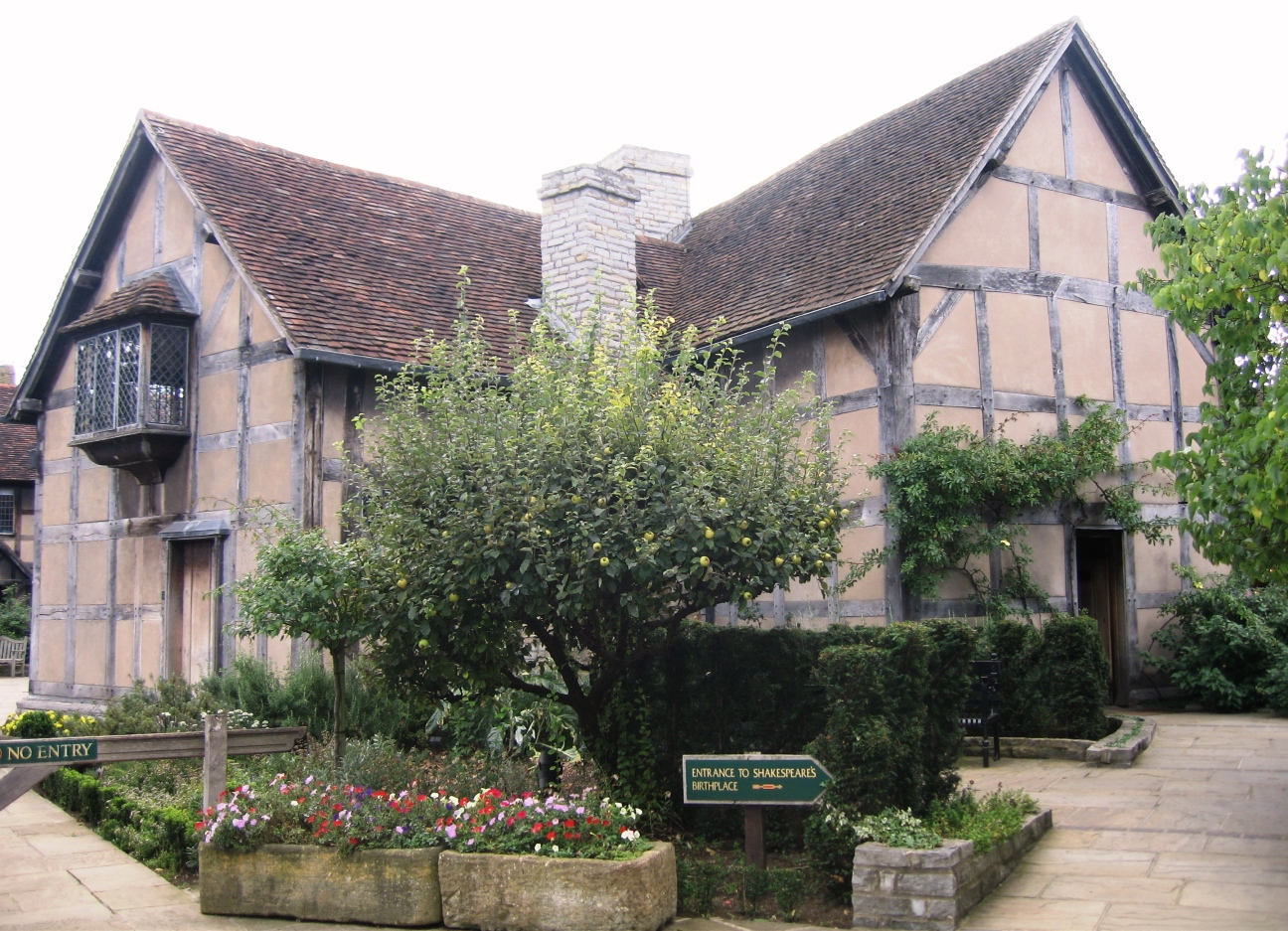
Garden at the rear of the house in 2006.

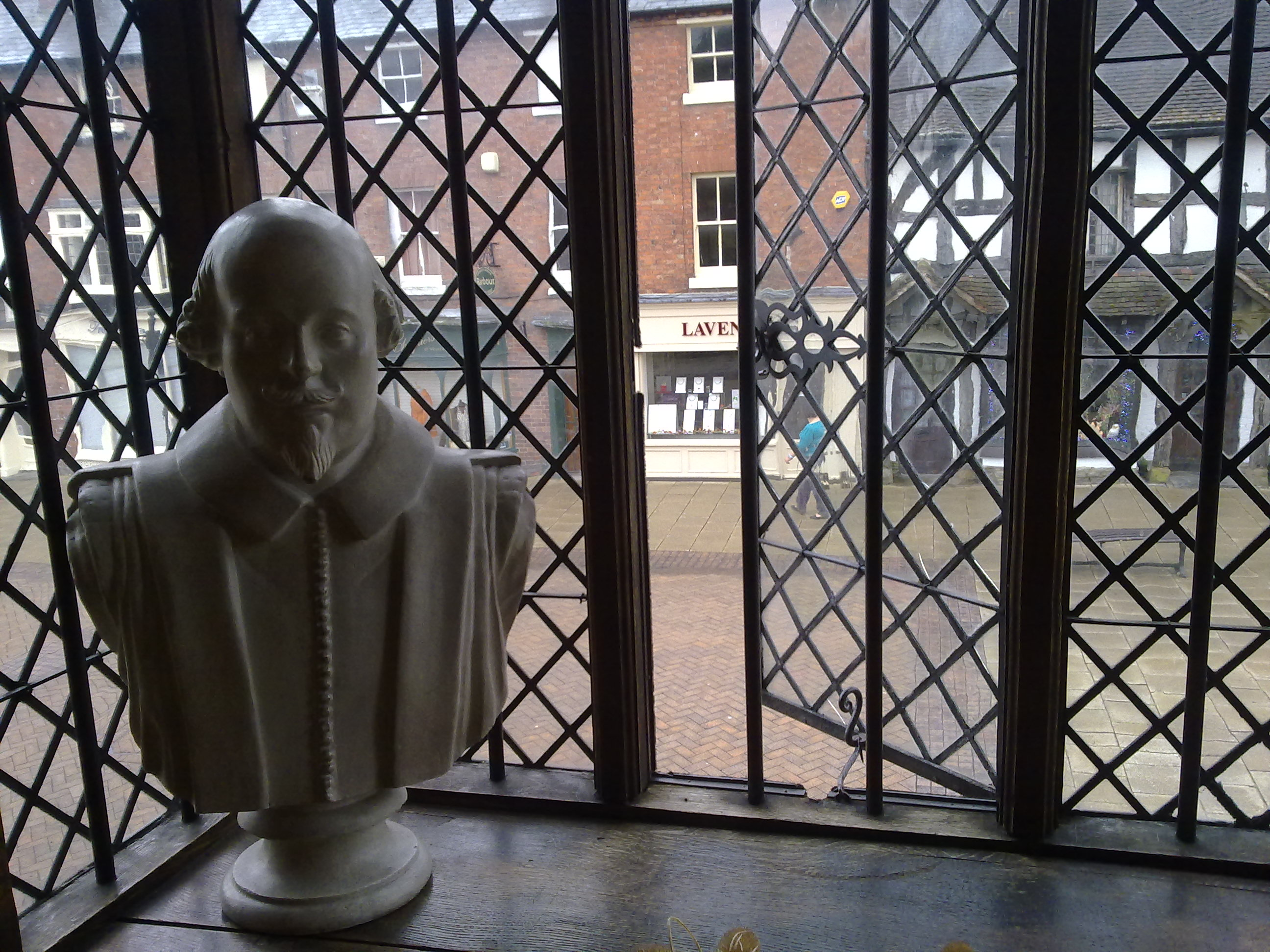
The view towards Henley Street from the upper floor of Shakespeare's Stratford upon Avon birthplace.

Adjoining the Birthplace is the Shakespeare Centre, a contrasting modern glass and concrete visitors centre which forms the headquarters of the Shakespeare Birthplace Trust. The driving force behind its construction, and opening in 1964, was Levi Fox, OBE, Director of the Trust from 1945 to 1989, with a view to properly housing its library, documents and collections. As well as showing Shakespeare-related displays, the Shakespeare Centre also provides public access to the Birthplace.

The Birthplace recreates a picture of family life at the time of Shakespeare complete with period domestic furnishings, a glass window inscribed with the signatures of visitors to the house over the centuries, and John Shakespeare's glove making workshop.

The walled garden at the back of the house has been specially planted with flowers and herbs that would have been known in Shakespeare's time.
