= Levi Fox =

English conservationist, historian, and author

- Born: 28 August 1914; England
- Died: 3 September 2006 (aged 92)
- Education: Oriel College, Oxford
- Occupations: Archivist for the city of Coventry, Director of the Shakespeare Birthplace Trust, local historian, author
- Spouse: Jane
- Children: 3

Dr. Levi Fox OBE, DL, MA, FSA, FRHistS, FRSL (28 August 1914 – 3 September 2006), was the son of a Leicestershire smallholder. He became Archivist for the city of Coventry and then Director of the Shakespeare Birthplace Trust, and was a conservationist, local historian, and author.

== Birth and early life ==
Fox was born on 28 August 1914 in Worthington, Leicestershire. He was the sixth of seven siblings. His father was John William Fox, a coalminer, and his mother was Julia Sophia Fox (née Stinson). After attending Ashby-de-la-Zouch Grammar School where he became head boy, Fox was a Bryce research student in Oriel College, Oxford and gained a first class Honours degree in history. He then spent some time doing research at the University of Manchester before being appointed the first city archivist for Coventry.

== Shakespeare Birthplace Trust ==
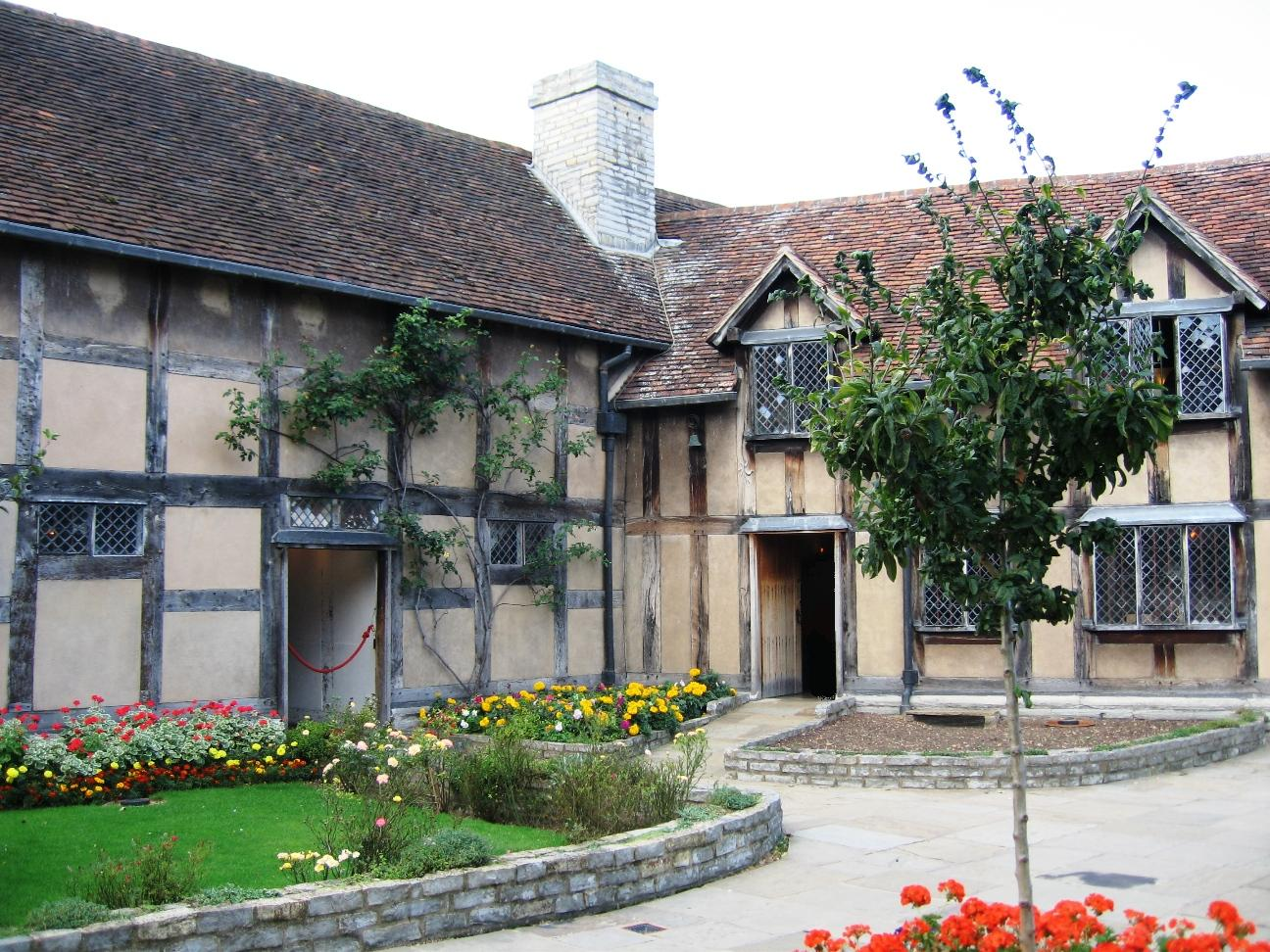
Gardens at the rear of Shakespeare's Birthplace (photo 3 September 2006)

Declared unfit for war service, Fox was appointed Director of the Shakespeare Birthplace Trust (SBT) in 1945 and built a loyal team around him.

The SBT can lay claim to be the oldest conservation society in Britain. Under Fox's direction many activities of the Trust, including its education work, records office, museums and gardens departments, and its conservation activities, developed and expanded greatly; and he saw the centre at Stratford-upon-Avon grow from a local organisation of some national significance into a body of international repute. The SBT is entirely dependent on its income from visitors to the Shakespeare properties and investments, and, under Fox it acquired some important properties. These include the land around Anne Hathaway's Cottage and Hall's Croft, the home of Shakespeare's daughter and her husband, John Hall; as well as Glebe Farm at Wilmcote, next to the (at the time) supposed childhood home of Shakespeare's mother Mary Arden (Mary Arden's Farm), when it was threatened by developers in 1968.

A major landmark was the opening of the Shakespeare Centre in Henley Street, next to Shakespeare's Birthplace, in 1964; built to better accommodate the SBT's library and collection of documents that attract scholars from all over the world. Fox worked tirelessly to further the cause of Shakespeare, served as secretary and deputy Chairman of the International Shakespeare Committee, and produced numerous books and articles. Also in 1964, he was awarded an honorary doctorate from The George Washington University.

On the occasion of his retirement from the SBT on 26 September 1989, Fox unveiled a commemorative plaque commissioned by the executive committee of the Trust in recognition of his service and achievements as its director. The plaque was carved by Paul Vincze with letters by Richard James Kindersley and hangs in the foyer of the Shakespeare Centre.

In retirement from the age of 75 years, as director emeritus of the Trust Fox continued to take great interest in its affairs. He was enthusiastic about such changes as the transition from the museum feel of the SBT's historic houses into more accurately exhibited and lively period homes. He was particularly pleased to discover in 2000 that Glebe Farm, the house he had saved from destruction, was the genuine Mary Arden's Farm (rather than the previously preserved Palmer's Farm).

== Other activities ==
Fox held the position of Deputy Keeper of the Records of Stratford-Upon-Avon, and from 1949 to 1991 he was a trustee of Harvard House, home to the mother of the founder of Harvard University. He also served as chairman of the Board of Governors of the Stratford-upon-Avon Grammar School for Girls, and of King Edward VI School for Boys where the Levi Fox Hall, opened in 1997, is named in his honour. He was the founder Chairman of the Friends of the Guild Chapel of Stratford-upon-Avon, a position he held for 50 years during which time the crumbling structure of the building was comprehensively restored and beautified.

He was an eminent local historian, and published extensively on the history of Stratford-upon-Avon and on the Midlands in general, serving for many years as secretary and general editor of the Dugdale Society.

== Personal life ==
Fox and his wife Jane, whom he married in 1938, had three children. Two of whom were twin girls that worked at Barclays Bank in Stratford Upon Avon.

He possessed entrepreneurial, organisational and communication skills and academic abilities. For example; on the night of 14 November 1940, when a German air raid destroyed much of Coventry, he took on the task of food distribution with great efficiency.

Fox died 3 September 2006 at the age of 92 years.
