= Levi Fox bibliography =

Dr. Levi Fox OBE, DL, MA, FSA, FRHistS, FRSL (28 August 1914 – 3 September 2006), was an author of numerous articles and books, particularly on topics relating to William Shakespeare and local history.

== List ==
Book title	Year
A County Grammar School	1967
A Shakespeare Treasury	1998
A splendid occasion	1973
An Illustrated Introduction to Shakespeare's Birds	1978
An Illustrated Introduction to Shakespeare's Flowers	1994
Anne Hathaway's Cottage	1994
Celebrating Shakespeare	1964
Coventry's Heritage	1947
Historic Stratford-upon-Avon	1986
In honour of Shakespeare	1972
Inside Hall's Croft	1979
Leicester Abbey	1949
Leicester Forest	1948
Mary Arden's House and the Shakespeare Countryside Museum	1994
New Place	1966
Oxford	1951
Oxford in Colour	1987
Shakespeare Country (Discovering)	1940
Shakespeare in Medallic Art	1982
Shakespeare on Glass	1984
Shakespeare's birthplace	1986
Shakespeare's England	1972
Shakespeare's Magic	1985
Shakespeare's town and country	1959
Shakespeare's town, Stratford-upon-Avon	1949
Stratford past & present	1975
Stratford upon Avon	1952
Stratford-upon-Avon and the Shakespeare country	1972
Stratford-upon-Avon, Shakespeare's Town	1994
The administration of the honour of Leicester in the fourteenth century	1940
The borough town of Stratford-upon-Avon	1953
The early history of King Edward VI School, Stratford-upon-Avon	1984
The Shakespeare Birthplace Trust: A Personal Memoir	1997
The Shakespeare book	1969
The Shakespeare Handbook	1988
The Shakespearian gardens	1966
The Shakespearian properties	1967
William Shakespeare	1964
