= Richard Green =

Richard Green may refer to:

== Arts and entertainment ==
- Richard Green (American actor) (born 1953), American actor
- Richard Green (Australian actor) (1962/1963–2021), Aboriginal Australian actor, language teacher, and elder
- Richard Green or Grass Green (1939–2002), African American cartoonist
- Richard Lancelyn Green (1953–2004), English Sherlock Holmes expert
- Rick Green (comedian) (born 1953), Canadian comedy writer, producer, director and performer

== Science ==
- Richard Green (astronomer), American
- Richard Green (neuropharmacologist) (1944–2020), British
- Richard Green (sexologist) (1936–2019), American sexologist, physician, lawyer
- Richard J. Green (born 1964), American chemist

== Sports ==
- Richard Green (cricketer) (born 1976), English cricketer
- Richard Green (footballer) (1967–2026), English footballer
- Richard Green (golfer) (born 1971), Australian golfer
- Rick Green (ice hockey) (born 1956), Canadian ice hockey player
- Richard Green (referee) (1937–1983), boxing referee
- Richard Green (rower) (1836–1921) sculling champion
- Richard Green (soccer) (born 1949), American soccer player
- Richard Green (speedway rider) (born 1965), British speedway rider

== Other ==
- Rich Green, New Hampshire politician
- Richard Green (politician) (1907–1961), Australian politician and judge
- Richard Green (chancellor) (1936–1989), first black New York City school chancellor
- Richard Green (curator), art curator and art historian
- Richard Green (shipowner) (1803–1863), English philanthropist and shipowner
- Richard Green (soldier) (1980–2002), Canadian soldier killed in 2002 by American friendly fire during a tour in Afghanistan
- Richard Green (technologist) (born 1955), Nokia's chief technology officer from 2010 until 2011
- Richard Green (telecommunication) (born 1936 or 1937), American telecommunications company executive
- Richard C. Green (1953–2015), economist
- Richard Firth Green, Canadian medievalist
- Richard G. Green (1913–2001), American lawyer who championed civil rights and free speech
- Richard K. Green (born 1959), American economist

== See also ==
- Ricky Green (disambiguation)
- Dick Green (disambiguation)
- Richard Greene (disambiguation)
