= Ricky Green =

Ricky, Rickey, or Rick Green may refer to:

- Rick Green (comedian) (born 1953), Canadian comedian
- Rick Green (ice hockey) (born 1956), Canadian ice hockey defenceman
- Rick Green (footballer) (born 1952), English footballer
- Rickey Green (born 1954), American basketball player
- Ricky Lee Green (1960–1997), American serial killer

== See also ==
- Dick Green (disambiguation)
- Richard Green (disambiguation)
- Ritchie Green, Australian rules footballer
