= Bureau of Silly Ideas =

British conceptual art organisation

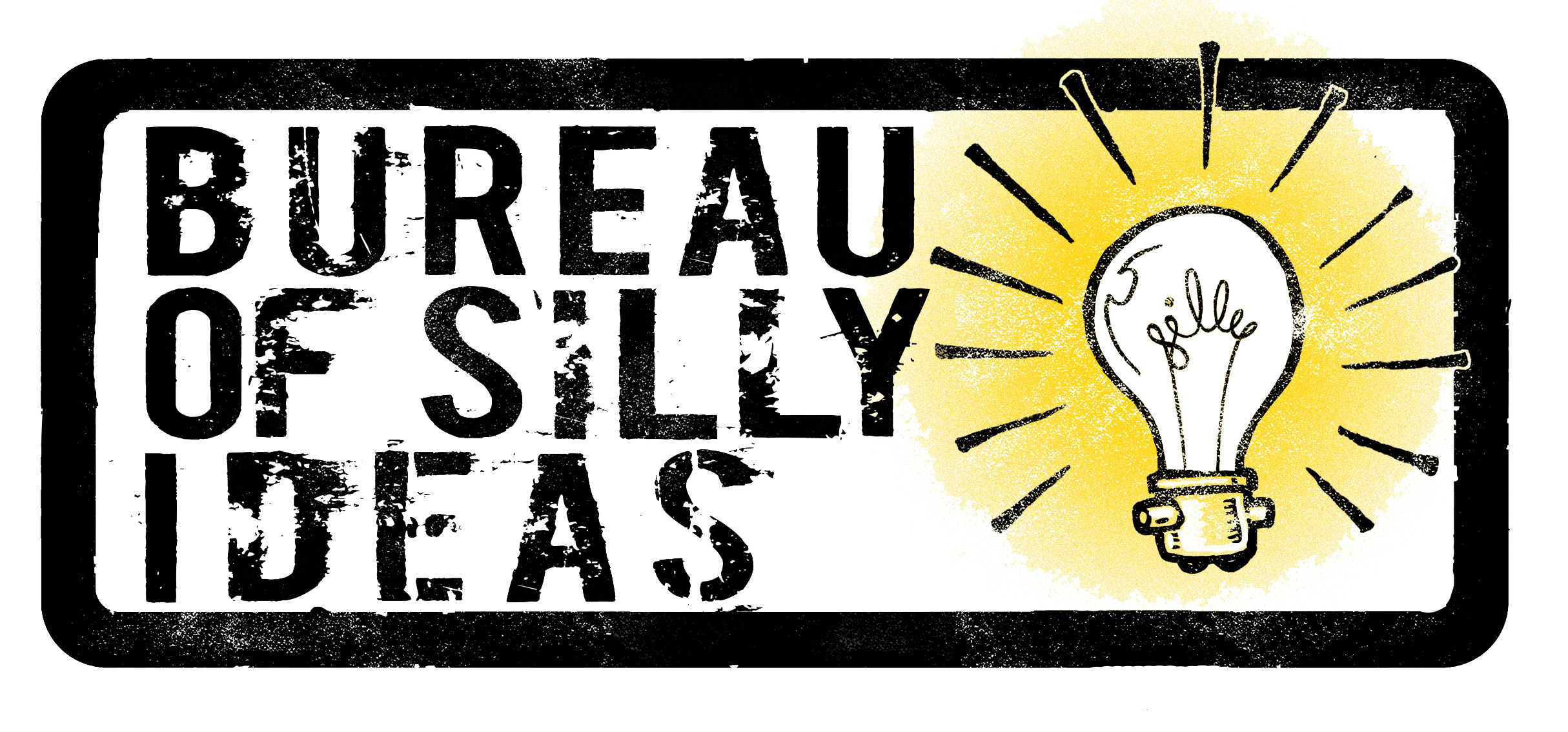
- Company type: Private company limited by guarantee
- Industry: Artistic Creation
- Founded: 8 October 2002
- Founder: Roger Hartley
- Website: http://www.bureauofsillyideas.com/

The Bureau of Silly Ideas Ltd. (BOSI) is a not-for-profit conceptual art organisation that produces shows and interactive installations; operating predominantly in public spaces. Initially founded in October 2002 by Roger Hartley and Claire Horan, registered at Companies House. In 2016 they further expanded to become a CIC Trust Organisation. The Bureau of Silly Ideas is funded by Arts Council England and headquartered in Brixton, London.

The majority of their work is in collaboration with local government councils across the United Kingdom, in addition to commissions from a variety of heritage sites and festivals across the world. They are also members of National Association of Street Artists and the Independent Street Arts Network. They were the first company to combine circus performance under the veil of construction work - transforming everyday objects into unassuming props or using radio controlled robotics.

== History ==
=== Early conception ===
The Bureau of Silly Ideas was founded in October 2002 by Roger Hartley, an artist who was predominantly interested in performance in public spaces. He was interested by the fictitious transformation of everyday objects and what he saw, as their ability to unequivocally connect with individuals. This was inspired by a show in 1997 that Roger began to work on with Simon Collins to create a show based on Don Quixote with life size fire breathing robot horses and radio controlled wheelie bins. Roger had early experience in transforming spaces as he invented and launched ‘Lost Vagueness’ a pop up working casino and Cabaret with strict dress code that would appear in places not used to dress code. Roger and BOSI continue to infiltrate festivals but with interactive art.

Roger was approached by Arts Council England to present ideas for street circus, theater and carnival; which has recently been accepted as forms of Art by the council. His proposition was performances that juxtaposed circus and funfair against construction sites and roadworks, which involved transforming these everyday objects and activities. His purpose was to engage people with their communities development in a fun and memorable way, in order to change their perception of something they may have otherwise found frustrating.

Roger received funding from Arts Council England and created the Bureau of Silly Ideas and the company's first show ‘The Hole Job’.

=== Development years ===
In 2008 The Bureau of Silly Ideas produced a show called ‘Big Oriental Squid Inc’ (BOSI) which was also an officially registered subsidiary company. The styling of performance names using the same acronym ‘BOSI’ has become a hallmark of their work. This show demonstrated an important artistic shift from concentrating on everyday objects to everyday companies. Pushing and exploring legal boundaries and exploring the public's reaction to fictitious but official companies. They were the first to use a cross-media approach for the narrative of a public art event, 2008 – Burst Pipe Dream in Brighton. Utilizing social media, fake news and company Big Oriental Squid Inc to provoke public backlash before unveiling the entire show as fictitious and for fun and then engaged them in the final performance. Subtly hitting multiple politically fused subjects.

=== At present ===
In 2016 Roger Hartley and BOSI worked as first resident artist for Shakespeare Birthplace Trust. Which culminated in the creation of the United Nations Board of Significant Inspiration (UNBOSI) and the ‘Garden of Curious Amusement’ in Stratford-upon-Avon.

"BOSI were an inspirational partner to work with, engaging in a really constructive dialogue with the SBT on exciting and unique project ideas, and then delivering a successful activity that met with excellent customer feedback from audience members who were both surprised and delighted with their experience.” Dr Delia Garratt (Director of Cultural Engagement SBT)

The UNBOSI project is continuing and has recently partnered with CPP Marketplace to conduct shows across the East Anglia area of the UK.

== Philosophy ==
The Bureau of Silly Ideas was founded in 2002 by Roger Hartley, who wanted to address the issue of fracturing communities within an increasingly connected and globalized world. The fundamental belief of the company is that the creation of, and access to, art is a pathway out of urban poverty traps. The method of exacting this belief was through Conceptual and Process Art performances; that transposed the 'everyday' into surprising and immersive experiences "taking a magnifier to Duchamp urinal and extrapolating its essence, to a much greater scale" - Roger Hartley. The aim was to combat the loss of community involvement by creating shows that stripped back community development, such as construction and attempt to change the perception of them from interference to interactive; therefore bonding a community more closely with its refurbishment.

== Shows ==
=== The Burst Pipe Dream ===
The Burst Pipe Dream was a 7-day installation that took place in 2008 at Brighton's Jubilee Square, under the guise of a subsidiary company called 'Big Oriental Squid Inc'. The purpose of the event is described by BOSI as

The story that Brighton would be welcoming Europe’s first Giant Squid Farm in newly developed, Jubilee Square. Created with two core aims in mind, the primary being community cohesion - the building of Jubilee Square had overrun and as such caused a discourse in the relationship between construction, public space and community. The second was to respond to the overfishing of our oceans by highlighting the role of corporations, who put profit before the planet. Since its conception in 2008, BOSinc has visited various towns. The Burst Pipe Dream is currently being redeveloped for a national seaside town tour in 2020.

The Bureau of Silly Ideas collaborated with Brighton Festival for the event. The event attracted attention from the general public and local news.

=== UNBOSI ===
United Nations Board of Significant Inspiration is a fictitious department of the United Nations, created by the Bureau of Silly Ideas and is collaborating with Shakespeare Birthplace Trust. In Christmas 2016, a light show called 'Garden of Curious A-MUSE-ments' was performed and involved the imbuing of marbles with inspiration.

=== Full list of shows ===
Full list of shows:

- Whole Job
- Small Job
- High Job
- Light Works
- Burst Pipe Dream
- UN Peas Corps.
- Zeppelin
- Playgrounds and Sightings
- Foot Patrol
- Royal Society of Plant Whispers
- Whiff of the Past
- Sweet Smell of Success
- Custard Pie Throwing
- Shirt or Squirt
- The Pineapple Car
- The Mobile Telephone
- The Menagerie
- Stroller Coaster
- Combustion
- Hsss2
- UNBOSI
- Armstrong Challenge 2023 and 2009 Cragside
- Island Storm
