= Dick Green (disambiguation) =

Dick Green (born 1941) is an American baseball player.

Dick Green may also refer to:

- Charlotte and Dick Green, enslaved frontier people of Bent's Fort
- Dick Green (rugby league)
- Dick Green, businessman and congressional candidate, see United States House of Representatives elections in Illinois, 2010
- Dick Green, British musician in Biff Bang Pow!

== See also ==
- Richard Green (disambiguation)
- Ricky Green (disambiguation)
