= Clout (radio show) =

American talk radio program

Clout is a talk radio program in the United States, which began on the Air America Radio Network, and is now airing on WCPT, a progressive talk radio station in Chicago.

The show is hosted by Richard Greene (a communications consultant, attorney and prominent vegetarian who has been closely associated with motivational guru Anthony Robbins) and debuted on May 26, 2007, airing Saturday nights with a replay on Sunday afternoons. The show is variously referred to on the air as "Clout", "Hollywood Clout", and "Clout with Richard Greene". In September 2007 Air America Radio moved the show to weeknights and could also be heard live on XM radio channel 167 America Left, a Weekend edition also premiered at that time, with guest hosts along with clips from Greene's interviews during his weekday show.

Air America Radio filed for bankruptcy and ceased broadcasting in January 2010; Clout can now be heard on WCPT and its live Internet stream, weeknights 8-9PM CT.

== About Host Richard Greene ==
Richard Greene is an American media personality, speaker and writer who was the creator and host of Clout. The Sunday Times of London called Richard "the master of charisma". He is the author of several books including Words that Shook the World from Penguin Press. Richard was also a celebrity judge on The Learning Channel's series The Messengers and is a regular contributor to The Huffington Post.

Richard Greene is also a speaker and speech coach with many high-profile appearances and clients including the late Princess Diana.
