= Shakespeare Birthplace Trust =

British educational foundation

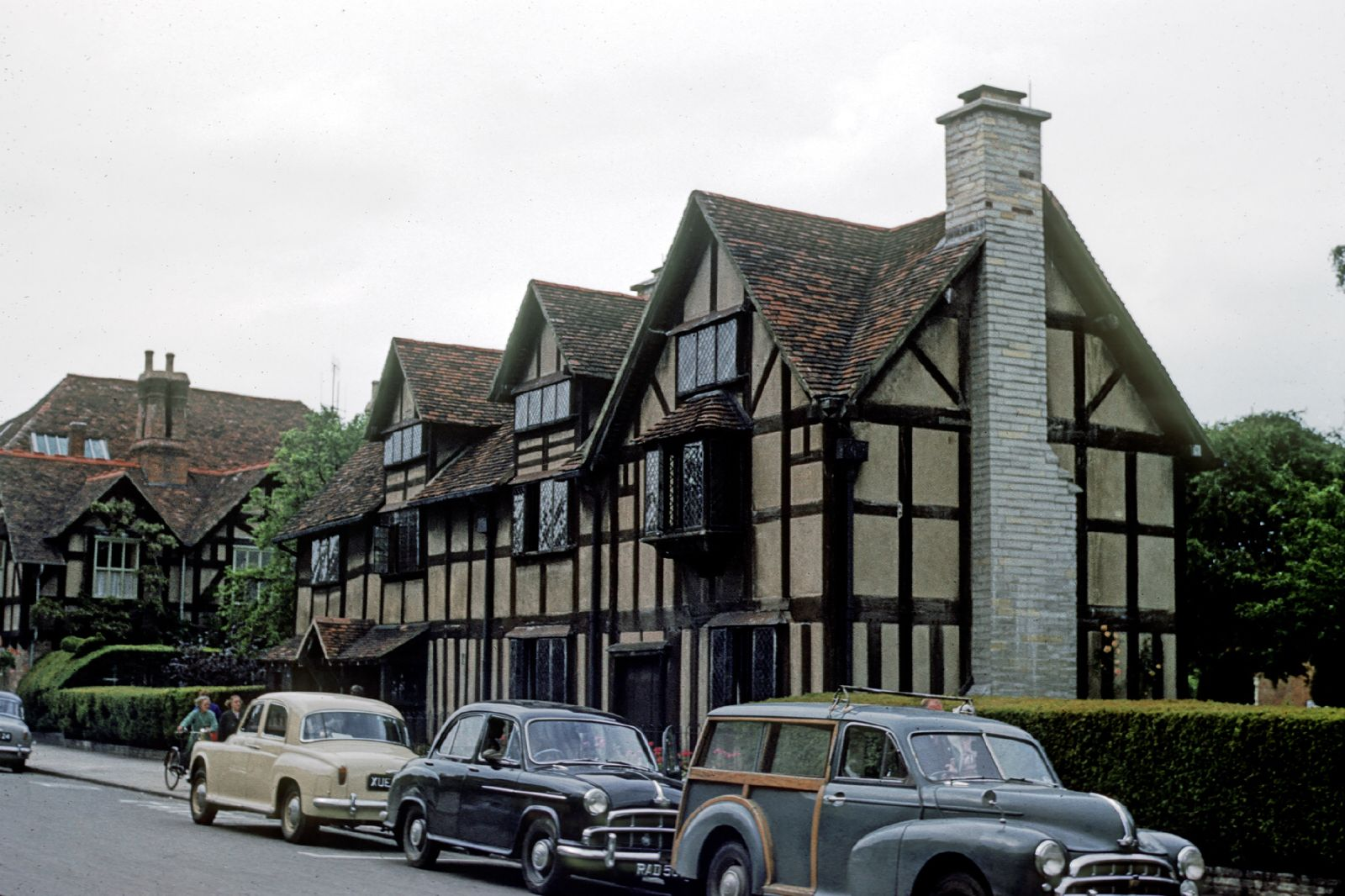
Shakespeare's Birthplace in the 1950s / 60s. The road in front is now pedestrianised and the house beyond has been demolished.

The Shakespeare Birthplace Trust (SBT) is an independent registered educational charity based in Stratford-upon-Avon, Warwickshire, England, that came into existence in 1847 following the purchase of William Shakespeare's birthplace for preservation as a national memorial. It can also lay claim to be the oldest conservation society in Britain. Receiving no government funding or public subsidies, it is totally dependent upon the public for support, and relies on donations and the income generated from visitors.

The SBT is considered the most significant Shakespeare charity in the world, and endeavours to internationally promote the appreciation and study of the plays and other works of William Shakespeare, and general advancements of Shakespearean knowledge. The Trust maintains and preserves the Shakespeare Birthplace properties, a museum, library of books, manuscripts, records of historic interest, pictures, photographs and objects of antiquity with particular reference to the life and times of William Shakespeare, and is also home to the headquarters of the International Shakespeare Association.

== Origins of the trust ==
Shakespeare Birthplace, &c., Trust Act 1891
- Act of Parliament
- Parliament of the United Kingdom
- Long title: An Act to incorporate the Trustees and Guardians of Shakespeare’s Birthplace, and to vest in them certain lands and other property in Stratford-upon-Avon, including the property known as Shakespeare’s Birthplace; and to provide for the maintenance in connection therewith of a Library and Museum; and for other purposes.
- Citation: 54 & 55 Vict. c. iii

Dates
- Royal assent: 26 March 1891

Other legislation
- Amended by: Shakespeare Birthplace, &c. Trust (Amendment) Act 1930
- Repealed by: Shakespeare Birthplace, &c. Trust Act 1961

Status: Repealed

Text of statute as originally enacted

Shakespeare Birthplace, &c. Trust (Amendment) Act 1930
- Act of Parliament
- Parliament of the United Kingdom
- Long title: An Act to confer further powers on the trustees and guardians of Shakespeare's Birthplace to amend the Shakespeare Birthplace &c. Trust Act 1891 and for other purposes.
- Citation: 20 & 21 Geo. 5. c. lix

Dates
- Royal assent: 15 April 1930

Other legislation
- Amends: Shakespeare Birthplace, &c., Trust Act 1891
- Repealed by: Shakespeare Birthplace, &c. Trust Act 1961

Status: Repealed

Text of statute as originally enacted

Shakespeare Birthplace, &c., Trust Act 1961
- Act of Parliament
- Parliament of the United Kingdom
- Long title: An Act to redefine and extend the objects of the Shakespeare Birthplace Trust; to vary the constitution of the trustees of the said trust and to extend the powers of the trustees; to repeal the provisions of the Shakespeare Birthplace, &c., Trust Act, 1891, and the Shakespeare Birthplace, &c., Trust (Amendment) Act, 1930, and to re-enact subject to variations certain of the provisions of those Acts; and for other purposes.
- Citation: 9 & 10 Eliz. 2. c. xxxviii

Dates
- Royal assent: 27 July 1961

Status: Current legislation

Text of statute as originally enacted

For more than 200 years after his death, Shakespeare's birthplace was occupied by the descendants of his recently widowed sister, Joan Hart. Under the terms of Shakespeare's will, the ownership of the whole property (the inn and Joan Hart's cottage) passed to his elder daughter, Susanna; and then on her death in 1649, to her only child, Elizabeth. Elizabeth died in 1670, bequeathing it to Thomas Hart, the descendant of Shakespeare's sister, Joan, whose family had continued as tenants of the cottage after her death in 1646. The Harts remained owners of the whole property until 1806, when it was sold to a butcher, Thomas Court. When it was again put up for sale in 1846 on the death of Court's widow, the American showman P. T. Barnum proposed to buy the home and ship it "brick-by-brick" to the US. To purchase the property for the nation, the Shakespeare Birthplace Committee was formed, and donors including Charles Dickens helped the committee raise £3,000 and bought it the following year. Incorporated by a local act of Parliament, the Shakespeare Birthplace, &c., Trust Act 1891 (54 & 55 Vict. c. iii), the Birthplace Committee became the Shakespeare Birthplace Trust.

== Properties ==
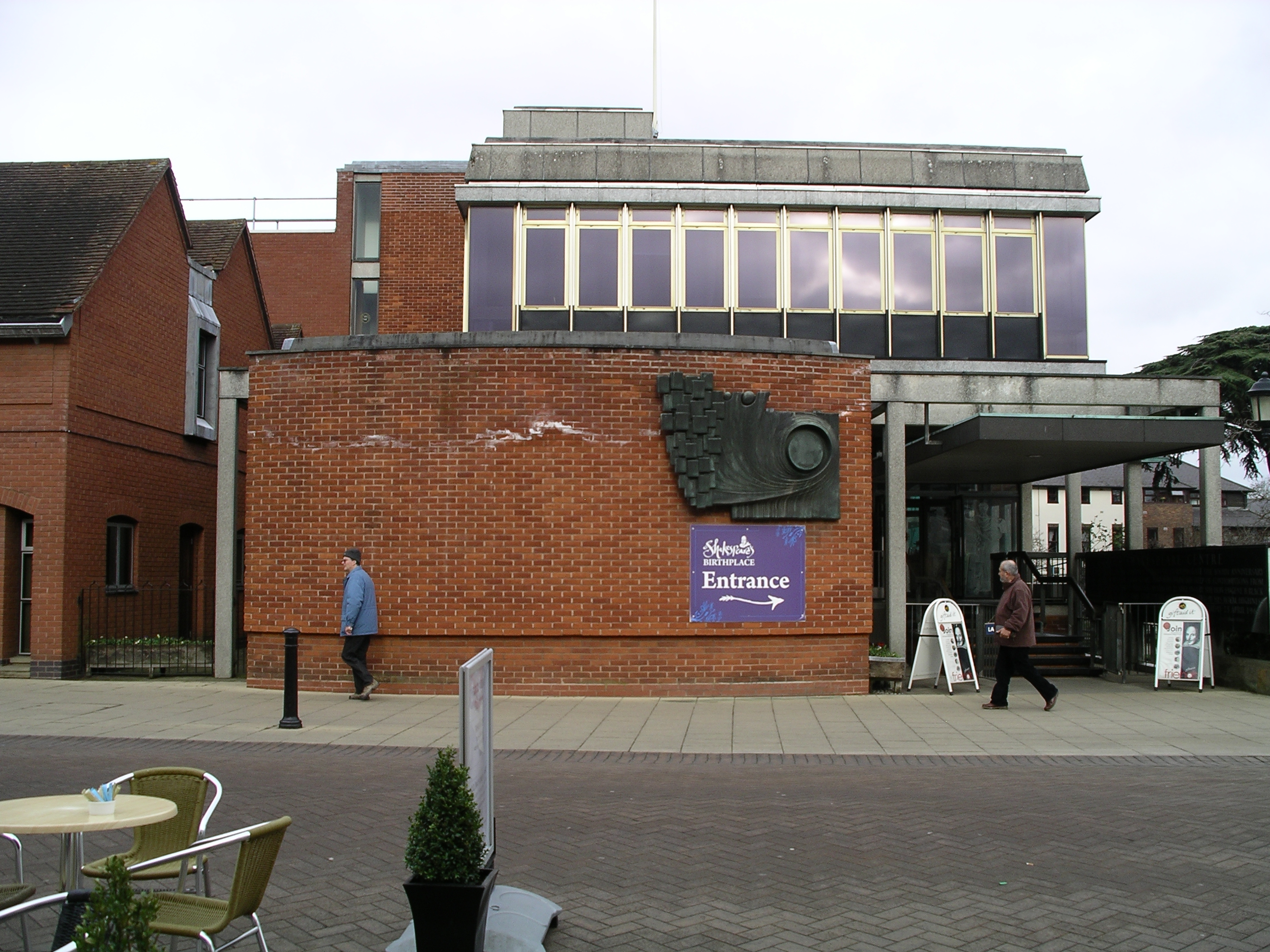
The tourists' entrance to Shakespeare's house is via the adjacent Shakespeare Centre opened in 1964

- Shakespeare Centre

The headquarters of the Shakespeare Birthplace Trust is the Shakespeare Centre, a glass and concrete structure next to the Birthplace. The driving force behind its construction and opening in 1964 was Dr Levi Fox, OBE, Director of the Trust from 1945 to 1989, with a view to properly housing its library, documents and collections which attract scholars from all over the world.

The Trust currently owns and cares for a number of houses relating to Shakespeare in and around the town of Stratford-upon-Avon as well as for Palmer's Farm and Harvard House:

- Shakespeare's Birthplace

William Shakespeare's birthplace and childhood home. The building currently recreates a picture of family life at the time of Shakespeare complete with period domestic furnishings, as well as John Shakespeare's glove making workshop ready for work. Other exhibitions illustrate the changing occupancy and functions of the Birthplace (from Shakespeare's time onwards): as a home, workshop, inn, butcher's shop, literary shrine and visitor attraction.

- Hall's Croft

Hall's Croft is believed to be the house of Shakespeare's daughter Susanna and her husband, Dr. John Hall, c. 1613–1616. It now contains a collection of 16th and 17th century paintings and furniture, as well as an exhibition about Dr. Hall and the obscure medical practices of the period. The SBT are currently carrying out major conservation work on the house. The house is open to the public.

- Anne Hathaway's Cottage

Located about a mile west of Stratford. Although called a cottage, the childhood home of Shakespeare's wife Anne is, in fact, a spacious twelve-roomed farmhouse with several bedrooms. In Shakespeare's day it was known as Newlands Farm, and remained in the Hathaway family for many generations. It was acquired by the Trust in 1892, and is open to public visitors as a museum.

- New Place and Nash's House

Created on the site of Shakespeare's family home in Stratford, Shakespeare’s New Place provides an imaginative contemporary perspective on Shakespeare when he was in his prime. It showcases artworks, contemporary landscaped and traditional gardens, as well as a major exhibition displayed in the restored and extended Grade I Listed Tudor Nash's House next door.

- Shakespeare Countryside Museum comprising:
- Mary Arden's Farm (Glebe Farm)

To the west of neighbouring Palmer's Farm and part of the Shakespeare Countryside Museum lies Glebe Farm, which dates from 1514 and was acquired by the Trust in 1968 when it was threatened by developers. In 2000 it was discovered that it had belonged to the Arden family and was in fact the true childhood home of Shakespeare's mother, Mary Arden, and the name Mary Arden's House was transferred to it.

- Palmer's Farm

Situated in the hamlet of Wilmcote, the 16th century farmhouse known as Palmer's Farm was once thought to be the childhood home of Shakespeare's mother, Mary Arden, and was purchased by the Trust in 1930. It was called Mary Arden's House until 2000 when it was discovered that in the 1570s and '80s it belonged to a friend and neighbour Adam Palmer instead, and the house was consequently renamed Palmer's Farm. Palmer's Farm together with Glebe Farm form the Shakespeare Countryside Museum.

- Harvard House

Situated in High Street, Stratford-upon-Avon; Harvard House was built by Thomas Rogers, grandfather of the benefactor of Harvard University, John Harvard, and home of Harvard's mother. From 1996 until 2010 it housed the Museum of British Pewter, before being re-interpreted as a fine Tudor home displaying artefacts of the era. Harvard House subsequently became a teaching venue for schools and colleges.

== Library and archive ==
The Library and Records Office, now amalgamated to form the Shakespeare Centre Library and Archive, house the Shakespeare and Local Collections:

- The Shakespeare Collections:

consists of the combined printed book collections of the Shakespeare Birthplace Trust and the Royal Shakespeare Company (RSC), as well as the archive of the Shakespeare Memorial Theatre 1879–1960 and of the RSC from 1961 onwards. The Trust maintains one of the world's most important Shakespeare libraries, the collections of which include translations of Shakespeare in over 70 languages, and many unique documents relating to Shakespeare and his family, second only in number to those in The National Archives in London.

- The Local Collections:

includes many thousands of archival records, books, photographs and maps relating to Stratford-upon-Avon and the surrounding area, as well as historical documents concerning Shakespeare and his family.

== Museums department ==
The Museums Department is responsible for the care and display of all the historic museum items that the trust owns, principally items that relate to Shakespeare's life and times, which encompass a wide range of material. Other collections include items that represent the social and economic life of Stratford-upon-Avon, and a special collection of pewter, dating from Roman times until the present day. The Trust's Collections and Conservation Department is based in the Shakespeare Centre in Stratford-upon-Avon.

The Trust owns various extensive collections:

- Archaeology

Roman and Anglo-Saxon artefacts from local sites including jewellery, weapons and ceramics. Also local fossils and prehistoric items.

- Art

Works of art relating to Shakespeare and to the history of Stratford-upon-Avon.

- Furniture and Furnishings

Domestic items dating from the 15th to the 19th century, particularly furniture dating from the 16th and 17th centuries.

- Numismatics

Coins and tokens found in Stratford and relating to Shakespeare. The collection also covers a period extending back to pre-Roman Celtic Britain.

- Pewter

The first Museum of British pewter based at Harvard House includes items ranging from Roman times to the 1930s, but has a strong core of 16th- and 17th-century pewter.

- Shakespeariana

Items linked to William Shakespeare himself, such as the purported Shakespeare's signet ring.

- Social History

A wide range of objects illustrate the civic, social and working life of Stratford-upon-Avon through the ages.

- Textiles

Examples of Elizabethan embroidery and 17th-century painted cloths.

== Education and activities ==
The Trust hosts a variety of events and provides talks, lectures and courses related to Shakespeare for the general public, and for students at all levels ranging from primary school pupils (with the Heritage Education team) to university students. Through its education department, the Trust also runs international programmes throughout the year on Shakespeare's writings.

The SBT runs the Stratford-upon-Avon Poetry Festival, the oldest in the UK. The SBT introduced the new Shakespeare Film Festival to its events calendar in 2012, the first festival of its kind in the UK.

At Mary Arden's Farm the SBT rears prize-winning livestock including Cotswold sheep and Longhorn cattle.

The Trust begun holding an artist in residence from 2015, the first being held by Roger Hartley who runs the Bureau of Silly Ideas. Others to hold the position include Thor McIntyre and Carrie Reichardt.
