= Richard Greene (journalist) =

Author and Journalist

- Born: February 25, 1954 (age 72)
- Occupations: Author, Journalist, Radio Host
- Notable work: (Radio Program) Clout
- Website: www.richardgreene.org

Richard Greene (born February 25, 1954) is an American media personality, author and journalist. In 2007, Air America Radio Network launched his weekly radio program, Clout (also known as Hollywood Clout) which he created and hosted. The show ran until the closing of the network in January 2010. He is also the author of Words that Shook the World first published in 2001 by Penguin Press’ Prentice Hall Press. The book’s foreword was written by self help guru Tony Robbins.

Greene, who is also known as a celebrity speech coach, with clients that include the late Princess Diana of Wales has been a regular columnist for The Huffington Post, with articles dating back to July 2008. Greene was also a celebrity judge on The Learning Channel’s series The Messengers.

== Author ==
Richard Greene is the author of the book Words That Shook The World: 100 Years of Unforgettable Speeches and Events, which was published by Penguin Publishing’s Prentice Hall Press and features an introduction from Tony Robbins, whom he worked with at the start of Robbin’s career as a business advisor and attorney. He is also the author of The Five Communication Secrets that Swept Obama to the Presidency, a training DVD and a workbook and "E=MC2 and The.New Definition of God" a children's book.
