= Hall's Croft =

House owned by Shakespeare's son-in-law in Stratford-on-Avon

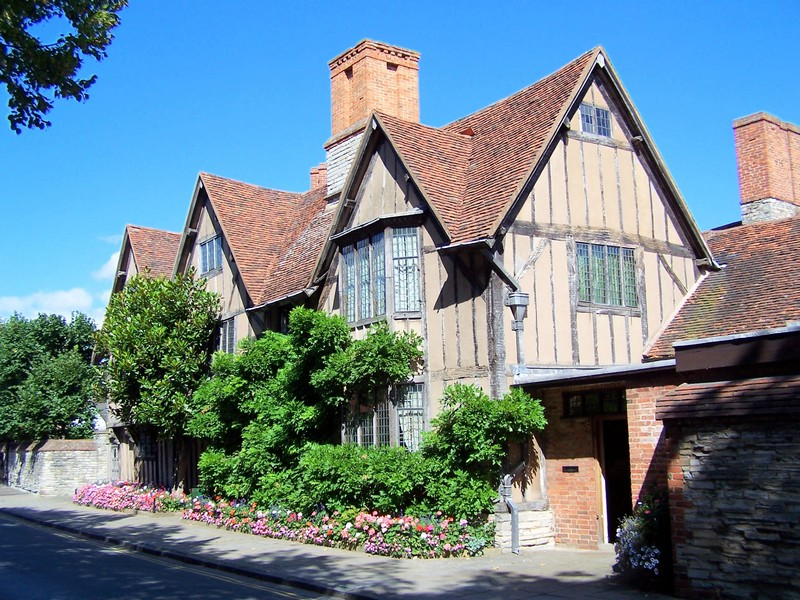
- Hall's Croft - Home of John Hall and Susanna Hall (daughter of William Shakespeare)
- Interactive map of Hall's Croft
- Location: 6 Old Town, Stratford-upon-Avon, Warwickshire, England
- Coordinates: 52°11′20.40″N 1°42′30.24″W
- Built: 1613
- Restored: c. 1631 – 1951
- Architectural style: Timber framing
- Owner: Shakespeare Birthplace Trust
- Website: www.shakespeare.org.uk

Listed Building – Grade I
- Official name: Hall's Croft and attached garden wall
- Designated: 25 October 1951
- Reference no.: 1187827

Hall's Croft is a building in Stratford-upon-Avon, Warwickshire, England, which was owned by William Shakespeare's daughter, Susanna Hall, and her husband Dr John Hall whom she married in 1607.

The building is listed grade I, and now contains a collection of 16th- and 17th-century paintings and furniture. There is also an exhibition about Doctor John Hall and the medical practices of the period. The property includes a dramatic walled garden which contains a variety of plant life that John Hall may have used in his treatments. John and Susanna Hall later moved to New Place, which William Shakespeare left to his daughter after his death.

== History ==
The surviving structure dates back to 1613, and Susanna and Dr John Hall lived there until early 1616, after which they moved to New Place shortly before William Shakespeare died in April 1616. They then leased out Hall's Croft before selling the property to Richard Smith before 1631.

The Hall family had sold Hall's Croft to Richard Smith, who last paid rent for the property in 1632. The property then likely passed to Anthony Smith (who was probably the son of Richard Smith) by 1637, who had moved into the property in 1634 and had added a new stable block and a new kitchen into an oak 'extension' of the house, which was completed probably in 1631, before Anthony had moved into the house. When Anthony died in 1646, his son Henry Smith inherited the property, and Henry built the back hall and landing between 1653 and 1678. Henry then sold Hall's Croft to Richard Walker in 1675, and the master bedroom was built by Henry Smith between 1670 and 1680, suggesting that Henry Smith possibly lived in the property until at least 1680, five years after its sale to Richard Walker.

Henry Smith's younger brother Richard Smith may have let out parts of Hall's Croft to tenants while the property was owned by Richard Walker, and William Smith (the son of Richard Smith) retired to Hall's Croft after his uncle Henry died in c. 1691. The sister-in-law of William Smith's first wife, Susanna Hurdis, who was also William's second wife, stayed at Hall's Croft after William died in 1708, and by then the property was owned by William's brother Isaac Smith. Isaac Smith sold the property in 1712 to Thomas Woolmer, making Isaac the last of the Smith family to own the property.

Thomas Umbers purchased the property in 1833 and with his brother-in-law Henry Best Sowdon who lived nearby, he ran the business of Stratford On Avon, Old Town Attorneys. In 1849 Thomas retired to Cheltenham and Hall's Croft eventually became a boarding school in 1850, then known as Cambridge House School, during that time that Thomas Umbers leased the property to Thomas Egremont Gee. Umbers' initial school was unsuccessful, and was closed in 1852. Reverends John George Rablah Stephenson and Henry Valentine Scriven occupied the house shortly after, and in 1858, Scriven reopened the school, which was more successful than Gee's school. The schoolroom and playground were also added by 1859.

The executors of the will of Thomas Umbers sold Hall's Croft to John and Harriet Lane in 1869 after Umbers had died in 1854. By June 1868, tenant Marian Stuart had converted Scrivens' school into a girls' school; by 1881, Stuart lived there with her three daughters and eight boarders. A fire broke out within the cellars in 1872, causing no structural damage, and Stuart closed the school permanently in 1883.

After the Cambridge House School closed in 1883, many notable people took up residence at Hall's Croft, including George Bernard Shaw, Marie Corelli and Catherine Croker; the first reference to the name Hall's Croft came from Croker's time at the property. Also in the 20th-century, many of the 19th-century renovations, such as the render, were removed by Josephine and Betty MacLeod.

It was reported in June 1949 that the then owner of Hall's Croft, Lady Elizabeth Montagu, wanted to sell the property which she had leased to John Slater. She eventually sold Hall's Croft on 3 November 1949 to the Shakespeare Birthplace Trust, and on 15 November 1949, Spencer Wood surveyed the building to identify how the house could be repaired. Restoration work began in 1950 and was completed and opened to the public by Spring 1951 in time for the Festival of Britain. Hall's Croft has remained unchanged since.

Hall's Croft closed indefinitely in March 2020 due to the COVID-19 pandemic, and by July 2020, Hall's Croft was planned to re-open by Spring 2021, but the property is still closed as of 2024.

A car crashed into Hall's Croft in October 2025, damaging the building amidst an ongoing conservation project. The crash was accidental.

== Gallery ==
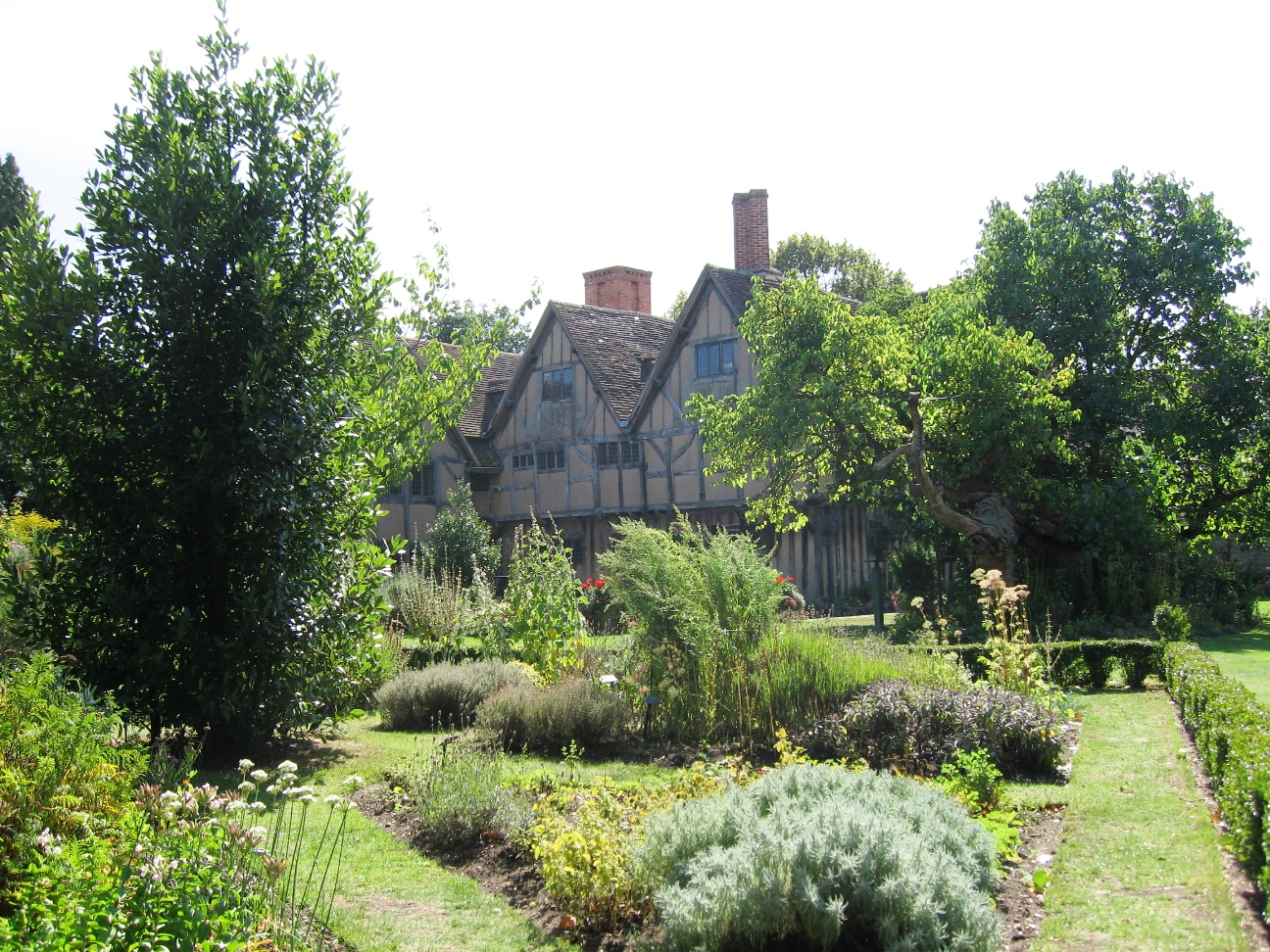
Hall's Croft and gardens

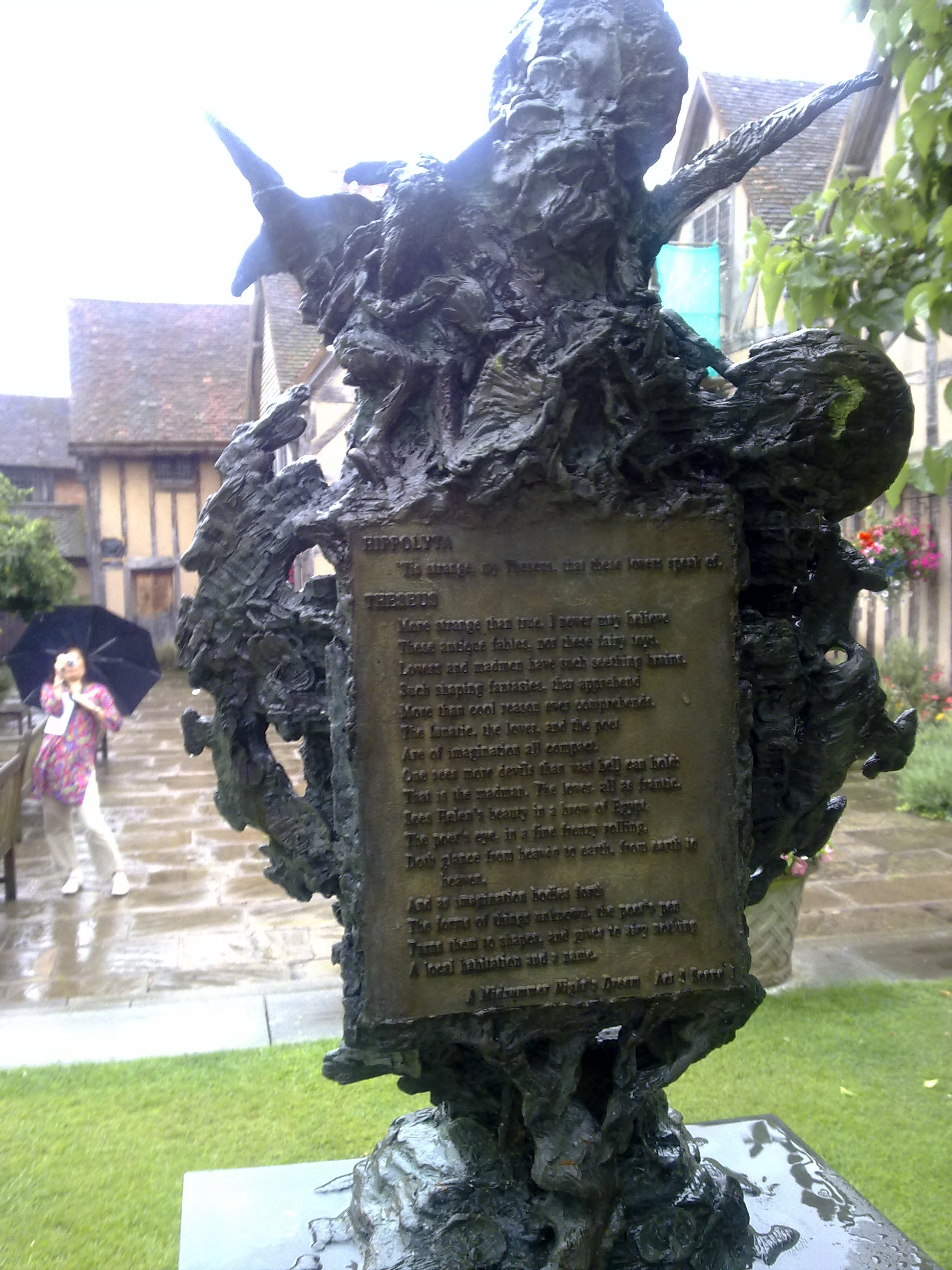
An excerpt from A Midsummer Night's Dream that is embossed at Hall's Croft

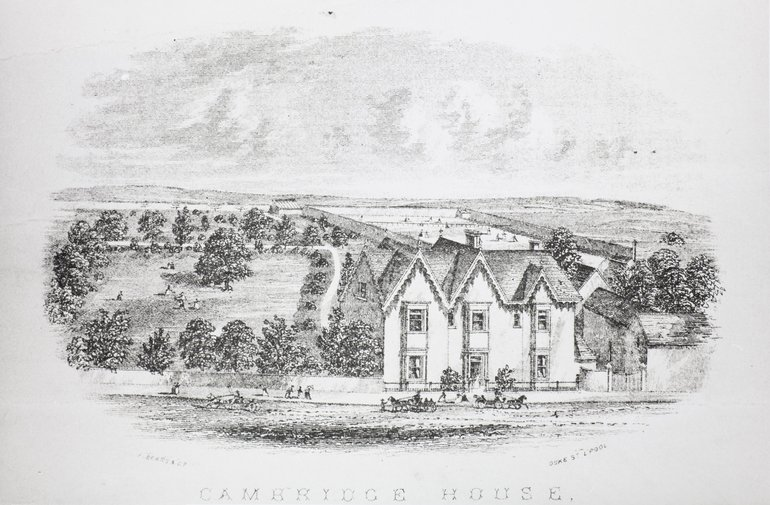
Hall's Croft between 1850 and 1883 as Cambridge House School
