= Richard Green (rower) =

Australian rower (1836–1921)

Richard Augustus Willoughby Green (August 1836 – 6 September 1921) was an Australian rowing champion who won 275 of his 346 races, including several in England.

== History ==
R. A. W. (“Dick”) Green was born in Sydney, Australia, a son of shipbuilder, George Green (1809 – 30 Aug 1872) and Maria Green (née Bates). George Green came to Australia at a very young age in 1825 and took up his apprenticeship. His shipyard was later based at Greenwich, on Sydney Harbour. The Green family's life revolved around the water - building various types of craft, often of innovative design, for the young colony, with some employed as pilots on the harbour. George and his sons were also very competitive in sailing and rowing, a sport in which several generations have since excelled.

Green was, in 1863, the first Australian champion sculler to compete in England, at the Thames National Regatta 21 July 1863. He won:

- Pair oars race
- Scullers race

In the single sculls match against Robert Chambers for £400 prize money, he led for much of the way before he became ill and had to withdraw. Green requested a rematch, which Chambers initially accepted but later declined. It was later claimed that Green had won the rematch by forfeit.
