= Mary Arden's Farm =

Farmhouse of Mary Shakespeare in Wilmcote, Warwickshire, England

- Glebe Farm; Mary Arden's House
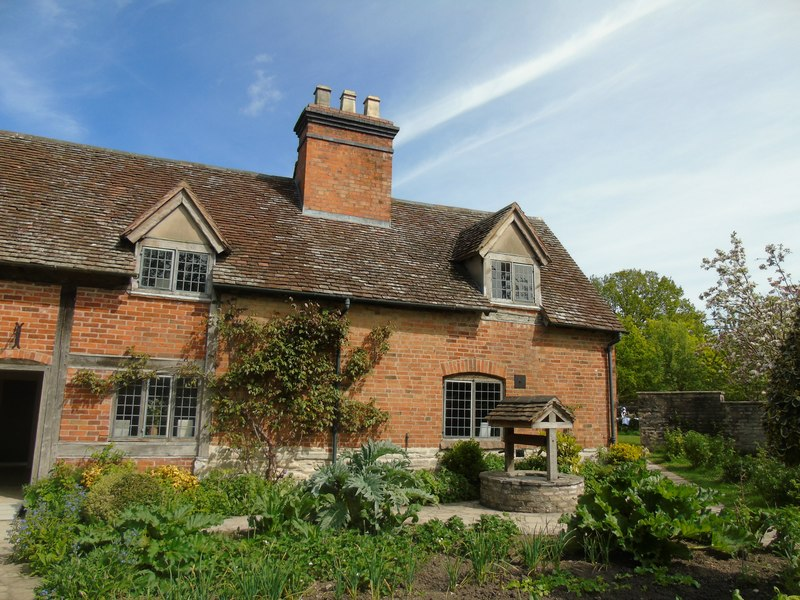
- Interactive map of Mary Arden's Farm
- Location: Aston Cantlow Road, Wilmcote, Warwickshire, England
- Coordinates: 52.2208°N 1.7618°W

Listed Building – Grade I
- Official name: Mary Arden's House and attached dairy
- Designated: 11 December 1969
- Reference no.: 1024575

Listed Building – Grade II
- Official name: Farmbuildings approximately 2 metres north of Mary Arden's House
- Designated: 11 December 1969
- Reference no.: 1184262

Mary Arden's Farm, also known as Mary Arden's House or Glebe Farm, is the farmhouse of Mary Shakespeare (née Arden), the mother of Elizabethan playwright William Shakespeare. Because of confusion about the actual house inhabited by Mary in the mid-sixteenth century, a nearby farm was conserved in the 20th century as "Mary Arden's Farm", but has been subsequently renamed Palmer's Farm. Both are grade I listed and located in the village of Wilmcote, about three miles from Stratford-upon-Avon.

== Glebe Farm ==
The house that belonged to the Arden family is Glebe Farm, near to Palmer's Farm. A more modest building, it had been acquired by the Shakespeare Birthplace Trust in 1968 for preservation as part of a farmyard without knowing its true provenance. The building has lost some of its original timber framing and features some Victorian brickwork, but it has been possible to date it through dendrochronology to c.1514.

== Palmer's Farm ==
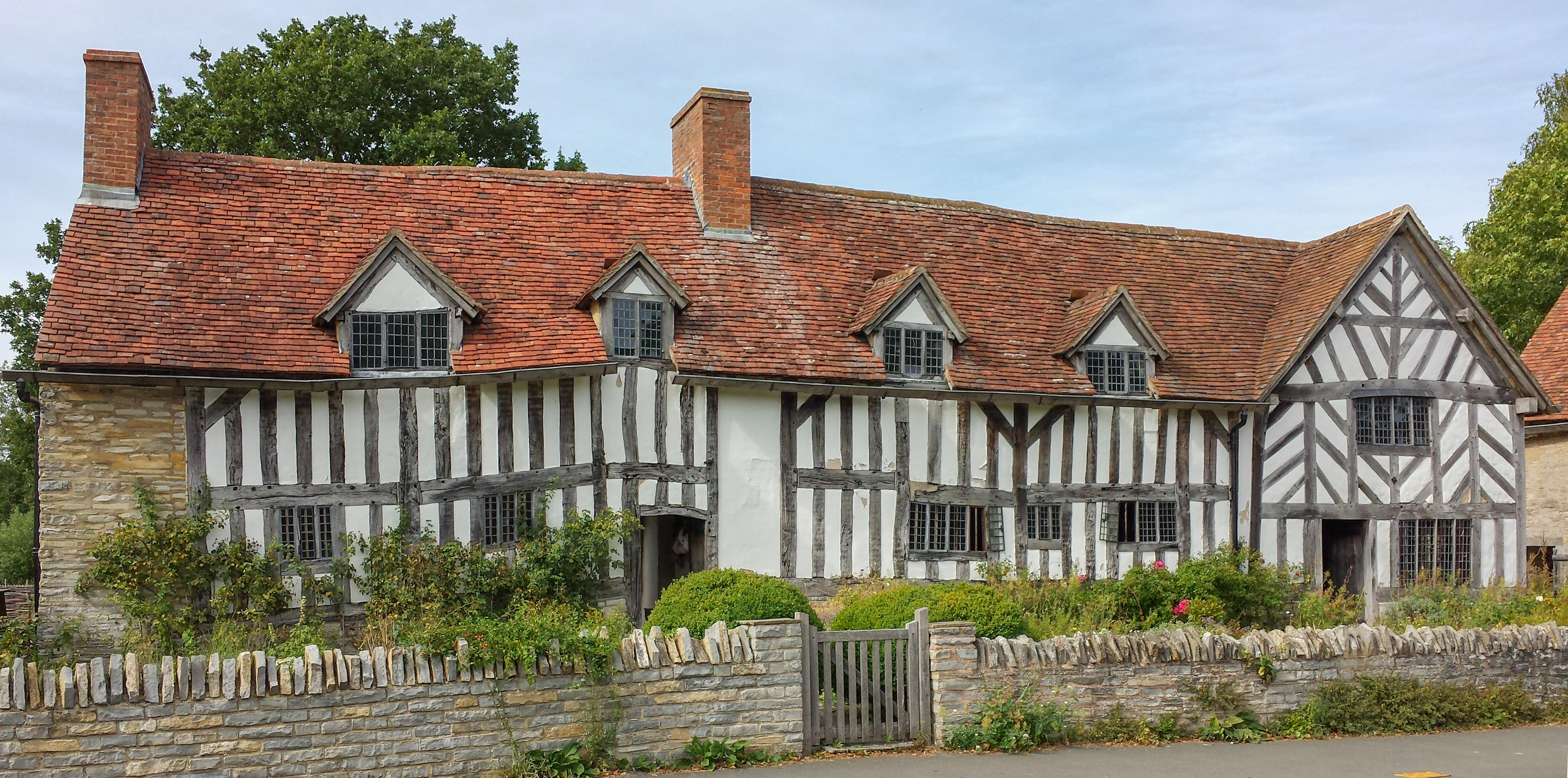
Palmer's Farm, home of Adam Palmer a friend and neighbour of the Arden family

A house wrongly identified as Mary Arden's (it actually belonged to a neighbour) was bought by the Shakespeare Birthplace Trust in 1930 and refurnished in the Tudor style. This timber-framed house has been maintained in good condition over the centuries.

In 2000, it was discovered that the building preserved as Mary Arden's house had belonged to a friend and neighbour, Adam Palmer, and the house was renamed Palmer's Farm.

== Houses and farm ==
The houses and farm are presented as a "working Tudor farm". The farm keeps many rare breeds of animals, including Mangalitza and Tamworth pigs, Cotswold sheep, Longhorn cattle, Bagot and Golden Guernsey goats, geese and birds of prey, including a hooded vulture.
