= Richard Greene (antiquary) =

English antiquary (1716–1793)

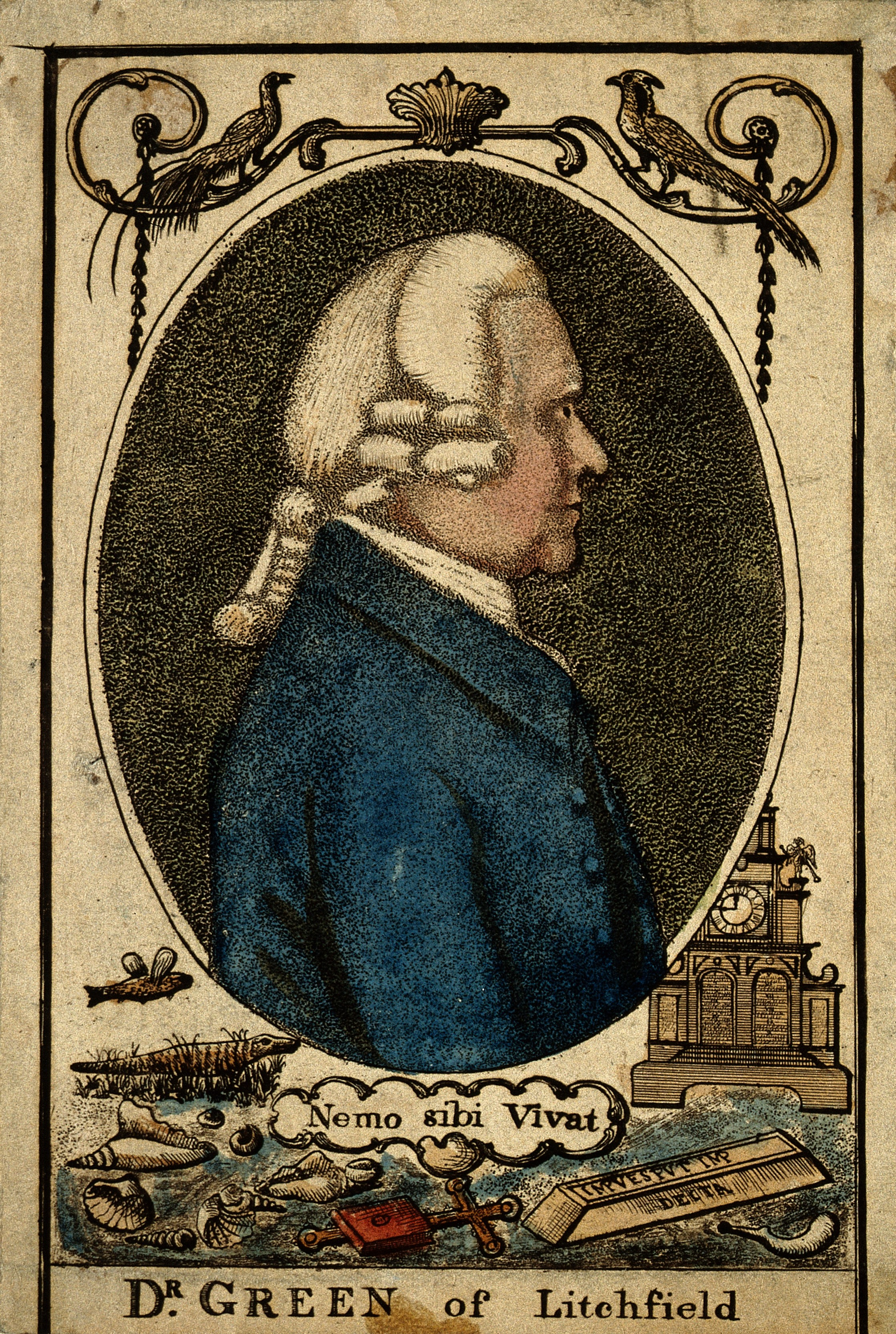
Richard Greene

Richard Greene (1716–1793), was an English antiquary and collector of curiosities.

== Life ==
Greene was born at Lichfield in 1716. The Rev. Joseph Greene (1712–1790) (Gent. Mag. 1790, i. 574), headmaster of Stratford-upon-Avon grammar school, was his brother, and Johnson was his relation. He lived and died as a surgeon and apothecary in Lichfield; a Scottish university conferred on him, it is said, the degree of M.D., but though highly gratified he never assumed the title of doctor. In 1758 he was sheriff of the city of Lichfield; he was bailiff in 1785 and in 1790, and was one of the city aldermen.

Greene was the first to establish a printing press at Lichfield, and from about 1748 until his death his zeal in collecting objects of interest never flagged. He deposited these curiosities in the ancient registry office of the bishops of that see, which stood nearly opposite the south door of the cathedral, and has long since been pulled down. A view of one side of the room of this museum, sent by the Rev. Henry White of Lichfield, appeared in the 'Gentleman's Magazine' for 1788, pt. ii. 847, and was reproduced in Stebbing Shaw's History of Staffordshire. The fame of his collections spread far and wide, and the building was open gratuitously on every day except Sundays. After a life entirely spent in the city of his birth he died there on 4 June 1793, aged 77. His first wife was named Dawson, and by her he had one daughter, who married William Wright of Lichfield. His second wife was Theodosia Webb of Croxall in Derbyshire, who died at Lichfield on 1 August 1793; she had one son, Thomas, a lieutenant and surgeon in the Stafford militia. Greene's portrait, with the motto, described by Boswell "truly characteristical of his disposition, Nemo sibi vivat", was engraved in his lifetime, and is inserted in Shaw's 'Staffordshire,' i. 308. A token still exists of him, and is described in 'Notes and Queries,' 1st ser. i. 167, 1850. On one side is represented his bust, with the words 'Richard Greene, collector of the Lichfield Museum, died 4 June 1793, aged 77;' on the other appears a Gothic window, lettered 'west porch of Lichfield Cathedral,' 1800.

== Collections ==
The Thrale family and Dr. Johnson visited and admired Greene's museum in July 1774. Two years later Johnson and Boswell viewed it together. Boswell admired the "wonderful collection" with the neat labels, printed at Greene's own press, and the board with the "names of contributors marked in gold letters" Boswell took 'a hasty glance' at the addition in 1779. There was printed at Lichfield in 1773 "a descriptive catalogue of the rarities in Mr. Greene's museum at Lichfield", with a dedication to Ashton Lever, "from whose noble repository some of the most curious of the rarities had been drawn". In the five-paged list of benefactors to the collection occur the names of Boulton of Soho Works, Birmingham, Doctor Darwin, Charles Darwin, Peter Garrick, Dr. Johnson, Pennant, Pegge, Dr. Taylor of Ashbourne, and Dr. Withering. A "general syllabus of its contents" and a second edition of the catalogue were published in 1782. The third edition was issued in 1786. In 1773 the collection was rich in coins, crucifixes, watches, and specimens of natural history; by 1786 it had been augmented by additions of minerals, orreries, deeds and manuscripts, missals, muskets, and specimens of armour. It also contained numerous curiosities from the South Sea Islands, which had been given by David Samwell, surgeon of the Discovery, to Miss Seward, who transferred them to Greene, and thus enabled him to obtain a medal struck off by the Royal Society in honour of Captain Cook.

A few years after Greene's death the collection was broken up. In 1799 his son sold the fossils and minerals to Sir John St. Aubyn for £100. Next year Bullock bought for a hundred and fifty guineas the arms and armour which were first exhibited at his museum in the Egyptian Hall, and were afterwards added to the collections of Sir Samuel Meyrick and in the Tower of London. Nearly the whole of the remaining curiosities were sold for £600 to Walter Honeywood Yates of Bromsberrow Place, near Gloucester, who made many additions, and in 1801 printed a catalogue of the whole. Most of these afterwards became the property of Richard Wright, surgeon at Lichfield (who was Greene's grandson, being the fifth son of the daughter who married William Wright), and at his death in 1821 the complete contents of his house were again scattered.

Greene was a frequent contributor to the pages of the Gentleman's Magazine. A woodcut from his sketch of a tombstone found in 1746 among the ruins of the friary at Lichfield appeared in its number for September 1746, p. 465; and so late in his life as 1790 he communicated to it a notice of a manual of devotion, written on vellum, and formerly belonging to Catherine Parr, the last wife of Henry VIII. A list of many of these articles, and several of his letters on antiquarian topics are printed by Nichols. Stebbing Shaw was favoured by Greene's son with the loan of some valuable manuscripts and plates from the museum for use in his History of Staffordshire, and he embodied in his account of Lichfield a description of the collection. When Johnson was desirous of placing an epitaph for his father, mother, and brother on the spot in the middle aisle in St. Michael's Church at Lichfield, where their bones rested, he sent the lines to Greene. Greene contributed some anecdotes of Johnson to 'Johnsoniana' (Boswell, 1835, ed. ix. 248).
