= Wilmcote =

Village in Warwickshire, England

Coordinates: 52.221°N 1.762°W

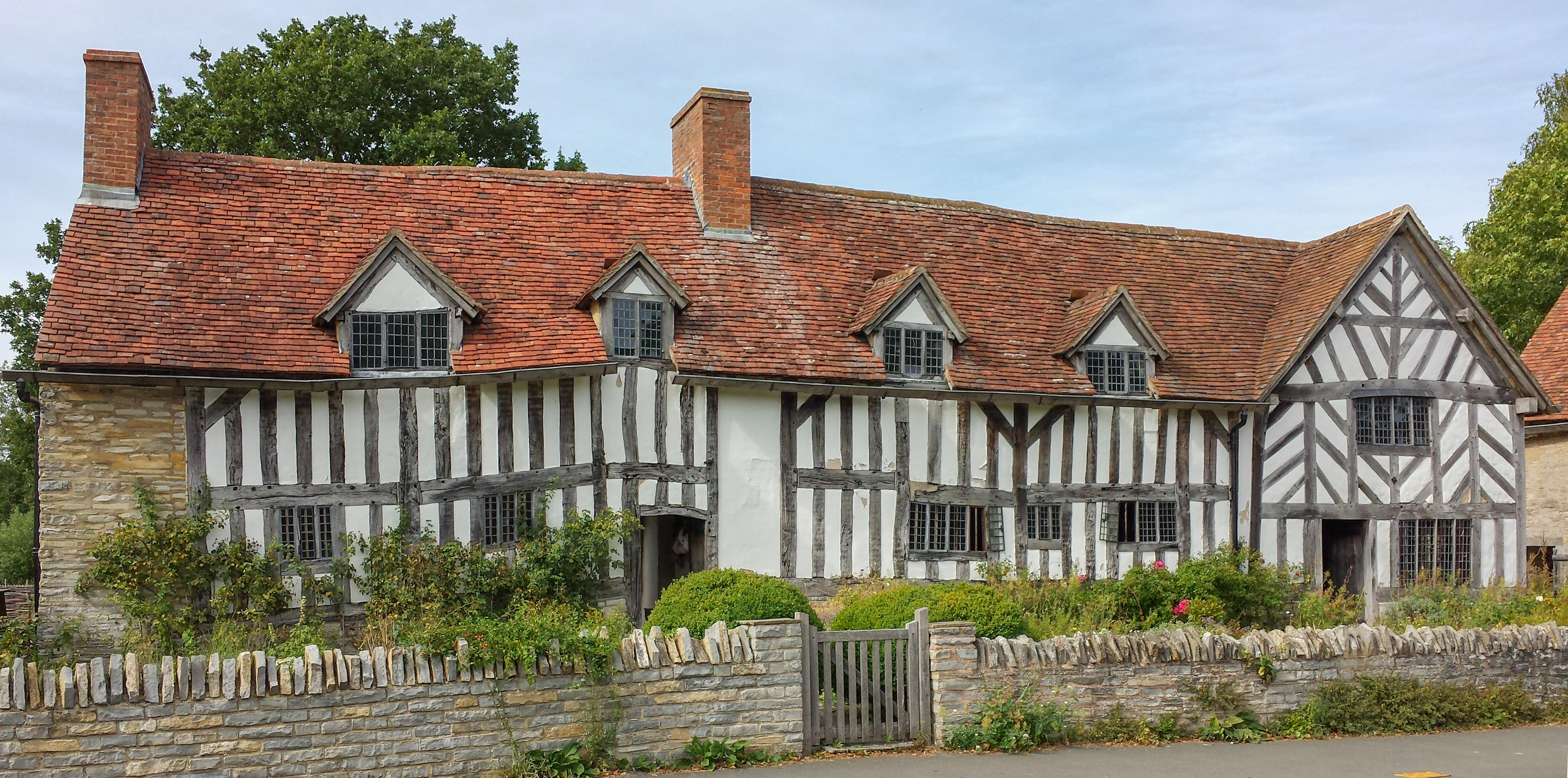
- Home of Adam Palmer, a friend and neighbour of the Arden family

- Location within Warwickshire
- Population: 1,229 (2011 Census)
- OS grid reference: SP163581
  - London: 106
- Civil parish: Wilmcote
- District: Stratford-on-Avon
- Shire county: Warwickshire
- Region: West Midlands
- Country: England
- Sovereign state: United Kingdom
- Post town: STRATFORD-UPON-AVON
- Postcode district: CV37
- Dialling code: 01789
- Police: Warwickshire
- Fire: Warwickshire
- Ambulance: West Midlands
- UK Parliament: Stratford-on-Avon

Wilmcote is a village, and since 2004 a separate civil parish, in the English county of Warwickshire, about 3 miles (5 km) north of Stratford-upon-Avon. Prior to 2004, it was part of the same parish as Aston Cantlow, and the 2001 population for the whole area was 1,670, reducing to 1,229 at the 2011 Census.

It has a church, a primary school, a village hall, a village club, one small hotel, a shop and a pub. Visitors are attracted to Mary Arden's Farm, the home of Shakespeare's mother.

== History ==
Wilmcote, listed as Wilmecote in the Domesday Book, is part of the lands of Osbern fitzRichard, whose father was Richard Scrob, builder of Richard's Castle. The entry reads: "In Pathlow Hundred. Also from Osbern, Urso hold 3 hides in Wilmcote. Land for 4 ploughs. In lordship 2; 2 slaves; 2 villagers and 2 smallholders with 2 ploughs. Meadow, 24 acres. The value was 30s; now 60s;. Leofwin Doda held it freely before 1066."

By 1205, according to Dugdale, it was held by Brito Camerarius, Chamberlain of Normandy and in that year was seized by King John, together with the other English lands of Normans for adhering to the King of France, Phillip II. In 1228 William de Wilmecote was claiming the advowson of the chapel here against the Archdeacon of Gloucester. In 1316 Wilmcote is called a hamlet of Aston Cantlow, and Laurence Hastings, who succeeded as Earl of Pembroke in 1325, is said to have given the manor of GREAT WILMCOTE to John son of John de Wyncote. During the Black Death (1348–9) Sir John, Eleanor and Joan, and three of the daughters died; and the last of the daughters, Elizabeth, whose wardship had come to the Crown as guardian of the young Earl of Pembroke, died in 1350.

No more is known of the manor until 1561, when an estate described as the manor of Great Wilmcote, including Mary Arden's house and land in Shelfield, was granted by Thomas Fynderne of Nuneaton to Adam Palmer of Aston Cantlow and George Gibbs of Wilmcote. Palmer and Gibbs held jointly until 1575, when a partition was made. The descent of Palmer's portion is not known, but Gibbs's, which included Mary Arden's house, remained in the family until another George Gibbs sold it to Matthew Walford of Claverdon in 1704. Walford's son and heir, also Matthew, married Elizabeth Jones and died in 1729, leaving his estates to be held jointly by his five daughters. Whatever manorial rights may have attached to this property had by now disappeared. At the time of the Inclosure in 1742–3 the manor of Wilmcote was included in that of Aston Cantlow, and Elizabeth Walford, widow, appears in the Award only as the proprietor of 5-yard-lands in the common field.

== Economy ==
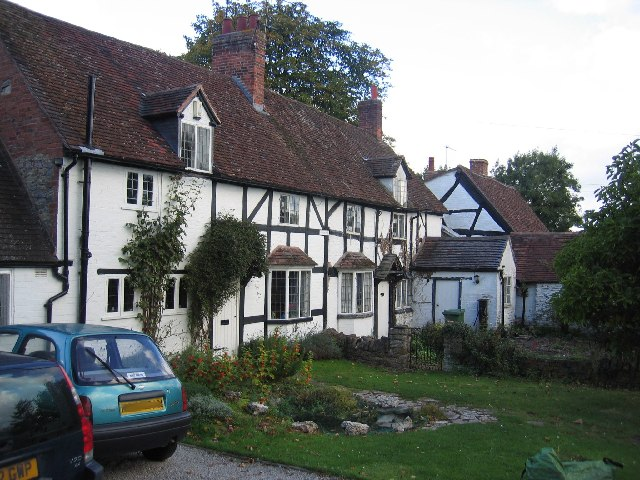
The Croft

Wilmcote contains areas of good limestone, and a significant quarrying industry grew up in the eighteenth and nineteenth centuries, particularly after the opening of the Stratford-upon-Avon Canal in 1816 which was routed through Wilmcote because of its quarries. Today the area has many small disused quarries, mostly filled in, and just-visible paths of tramways linking them to the canal. A larger quarry, which has not been filled in, is now a nature reserve. There are remains of lime kilns, built to turn the limestone into cement.

Wilmcote stone splits well into sheets and was used for paving as well as for building. It was used for paving the floors in the United Kingdom Houses of Parliament when these were rebuilt in the nineteenth century.

The last of the quarries closed in the early twentieth century, but they have left a great legacy for the village. There are several rows of former quarry workers cottages, built in Wilmcote stone, and a former pub which was known as the Masons' Arms. The quarries were among the reasons why the canal and railway were routed through Wilmcote. The first Wilmcote railway station opened in 1860, on a site alongside the canal wharves; it was replaced by the present station when the line was doubled in 1908.

The Masons' Arms pub closed in 2019 and is currently being converted into a residential property. The Mary Arden is the village's only remaining pub.

== Governance ==
Wilmcote is part of the Aston Cantlow ward of Stratford on Avon District Council, and is represented by Councillor Ian Shenton, Conservative. Nationally it is part of Stratford on Avon constituency, whose member of parliament following the 2010 election is Nadhim Zahawi of the Conservative Party. It was included in the West Midlands electoral region of the European Parliament.

== Religious sites ==
There was a chapel at Wilmcote, first mentioned in 1228 when the advowson was in dispute between William de Wilmcote, and the Archdeacon of Gloucester. In the 14th century the advowson was held with the manor of Little Wilmcote, until in 1481 Henry de Lisle gave it to the Gild of the Holy Cross at Stratford. The chaplains were instituted and inducted by the vicars of Stratford.

The Oxford Movement was a Catholic revival movement in the Church of England in the early nineteenth century, centred in Oxford and Wilmcote was the site they chose to build a church, a school and a retreat house. The early nineteenth-century village had no church, it was then a part of the adjoining parish of Aston Cantlow but with a growing working class population due to the growth of the Wilmcote quarries the village was much in need of a church and a school. The modern church of St Andrew, built in 1841, is a monument to the influence of the Oxford Movement in the parish. It was built by the Rev. Francis Fortescue-Knottesford and his son, Edward Fortescue , who became the first curate, to meet the semi-industrial conditions created by the opening of the cement works in the 1830s. It is a small Anglo-Catholic church, dark, spiritual, and on Sundays filled with the smell of incense. It was designed by the renowned architect William Butterfield, a leader in the Gothic revival.

== Education ==
Situated in Church Road is Wilmcote Church of England (Voluntary Aided) Primary School, which educates 80 children from the age of 4 to 11.

== Transport links ==
Wilmcote railway station is situated on the Stratford-upon-Avon branch line (one of the Snow Hill Lines) and is served by West Midlands Trains with services to Stratford-upon-Avon and Birmingham Snow Hill whilst Chiltern Railways serve Leamington Spa and London Marylebone. The village is a popular stop on the Stratford-upon-Avon to Birmingham Canal, and is on a National Cycleway.

== Notable people ==
Mary Arden was born in Wilmcote around 1540. A farmer's daughter, she married John Shakespeare, moved to Stratford-upon-Avon, and gave birth to William Shakespeare, who is recognised as the greatest English playwright ever. Mary Arden's House, now owned by the Shakespeare Birthplace Trust, is closed to the public and houses a museum of countryside life. William Shakespeare's life and times have been extensively researched and documented and much is therefore known about Wilmcote from the time of Mary Arden onwards.

== Cultural references ==
It is the consensus among scholars that the Induction of The Taming of The Shrew is set in rural Warwickshire. One character mentioned, however, allows for a greater localization – to the village of Wilmcote. Sly, the drunken tinker, beseeches the Lord: "Ask Marian Hacket, the fat ale-wife of Wincot, if she know me not" [Ind.2.18–19]. The minutes of the Stratford Corporation, 11 November 1584 (approximately a decade before the play), mention "the tythes of Wyncote", the very spelling of the village that appears in the Folio text of The Shrew.
