= Anne Hathaway (disambiguation) =

Anne Hathaway (born 1982) is an American actress.

Anne Hathaway may also refer to:

- Anne Hathaway (wife of Shakespeare) (1556–1623)
  - "Anne Hathaway" (poem), by Carol Ann Duffy
  - Portrait of Anne Hathaway
- Mary Bigelow Ingham (1832–1923), American author who used the pen name Anne Hathaway
- Anne Hathaway, chair of the Indiana Republican Party (2023–2024)

== See also ==
- Anne Hathaway's Cottage, a restored cottage in which Shakespeare's wife lived
