= Shakespeare's Wife =

2007 book by Germaine Greer

- Cover of the first edition
- Author: Germaine Greer
- Language: English
- Subjects: Biography
- Publisher: Bloomsbury Publishing
- Publication date: 2007
- Publication place: United Kingdom
- Media type: Print
- Pages: 406
- ISBN: 978-0061537158

Shakespeare's Wife is a book by feminist academic Germaine Greer which was first published in 2007 by Bloomsbury. The book is a biography of Anne Hathaway, the wife of English poet and playwright William Shakespeare who was born in Shottery, a small village within Stratford-upon-Avon. At the time of its publication, very little was known about Hathaway with most information being sourced from historic legal documents. Greer, in addition to discussing the content of Hathaway's life, also outlines various aspects of a provincial Elizabethan woman's life as a means to understand the lifestyle she likely led.

The book also talks in-depth about the marriage between William Shakespeare and Anne Hathaway and challenges various theories surrounding it. Greer also argues that Hathaway was likely literate and, based on the standing of their families in Warwickshire, may have been regarded as a more desirable match when compared to her husband.

== Reception ==
In an article published in The Guardian, Charles Nicholl says, "In part her book succeeds in this mission. She gives a robust account of Ann's origins and formative family experiences: she finds the Hathaways 'a frugal, no-nonsense people,' and notes the Puritan leanings of some of the family." In Literary Review, Katherine Duncan-Jones comments on a “savagely expressed scorn for everyone else who has ever written about Shakespeare”, describing it as “a damagingly distracting deformity.” An article published in The New York Times also commented "Though generally appreciative, several Shakespeare scholars have found Greer's approach 'stridently [...] combative' and full of 'scattergun assaults.' But for those accustomed to Greer's feminist provocations, "Shakespeare’s Wife" will seem extremely sober and restrained." Reviewing the book for Publishers Weekly, Marilyn French said that "Greer offers a richly textured account of the lives of ordinary women in Stratford and similar towns in the late 16th and early 17th centuries."
