= Corrie Corfield =

English radio broadcaster and producer

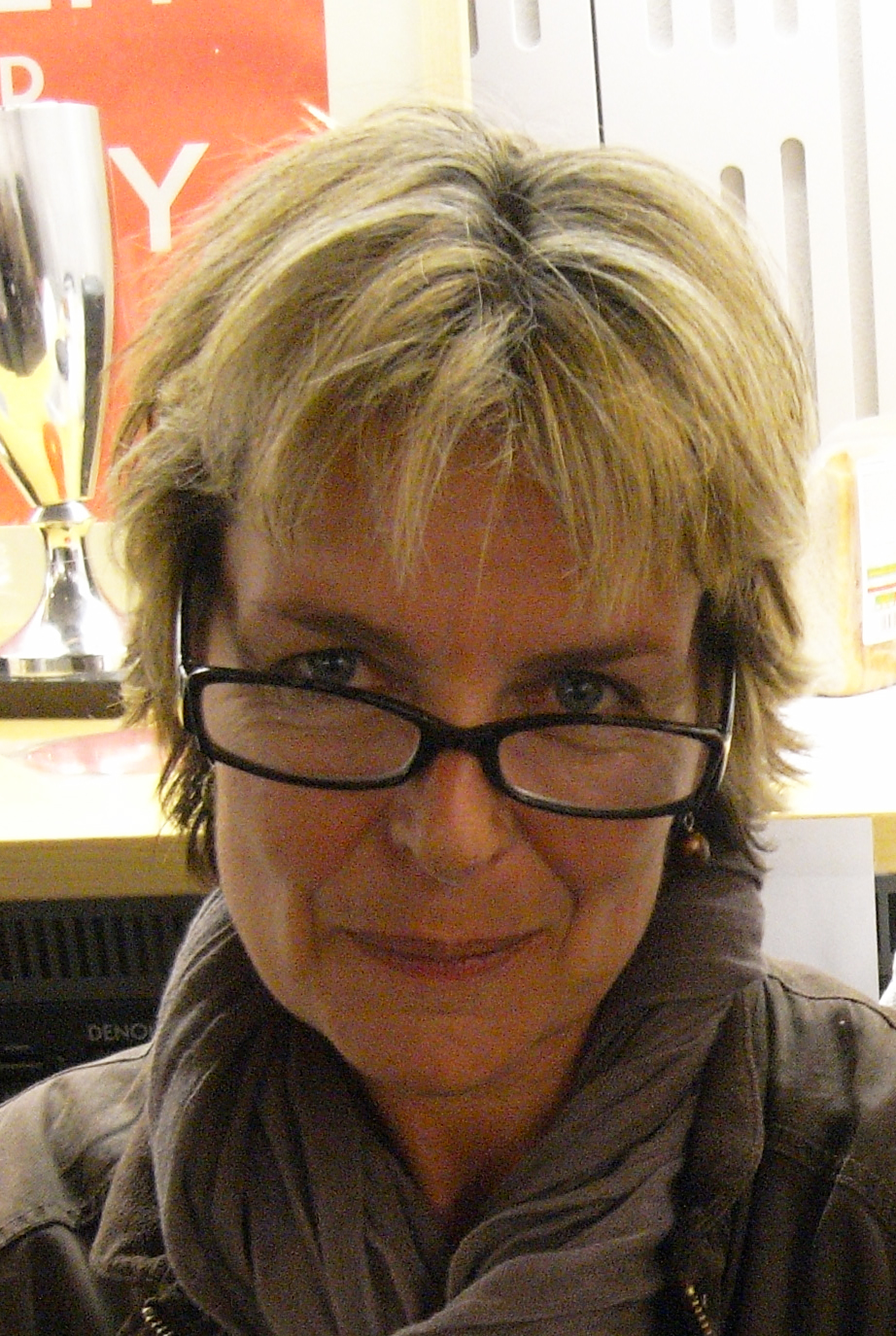
- Corrie Corfield in 2011
- Born: Corrie Corfield; 1961 (age 64–65); Oxford, England
- Education: Stratford-upon-Avon Grammar School for Girls; Goldsmiths, University of London
- Occupations: Continuity announcer and newsreader
- Employer: BBC
- Corrie Corfield's voice recorded November 2012

Corrie Corfield is a radio broadcaster and producer known especially for her newsreading and continuity announcements on BBC Radio 4.

== Early life and education ==
She was born 1961 in Oxford, raised near Stratford-upon-Avon and educated at Stratford-upon-Avon Grammar School for Girls.

She then read English and Drama at Goldsmiths, University of London

== Broadcasting career ==
She joined the BBC as a studio manager in 1983 with the World Service. In 1987 she worked at the new BBC 648, and also became a newsreader for the World Service and read the news on Radio 4 from 1988.

Between 1991 and 1995 she lived in South Africa, where she worked at Radio 702. She also worked as a producer for the Canadian Broadcasting Corporation. She returned to Radio 4 in 1995.

Over a period from late 2010, with colleague Kathy Clugston, Corfield persuaded broadcasters connected with Radio 4 to don the 'slanket of con', a garment purportedly worn by continuity announcers in the air-conditioned chill of studio 40B as they read the late night shipping bulletin, and has photographed the wearers in various comic poses. The garment was sold in a raffle for Comic Relief in 2012.

In 2016, she placed seventh in a Radio Times poll of the top voices on UK radio.

She read the Six O'Clock News for the last time on BBC Radio 4 on 23 February 2021.
