= Stratford Girls' Grammar School =

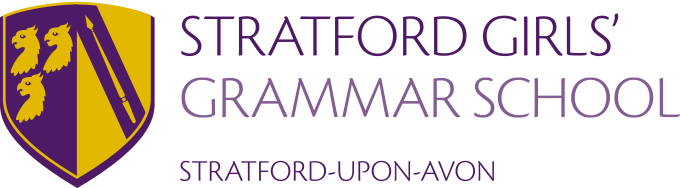

Location
- Shottery Manor; Shottery; Stratford-upon-Avon, Warwickshire, CV37 9HA; England; 52.19°N 1.7247°W

Information
- Type: Grammar school, Academy
- Established: 1958
- Department for Education URN: 137235 Tables
- Ofsted: Reports
- Chairman of the Governors: John Millett
- Head teacher: Jacqueline Cornell
- Gender: Girls
- Age: 11 to 18
- Enrolment: 808
- Houses: Orion, Cygnus, Phoenix and Ursa as of September 2014 (formerly Austen, Brontë and Eliot)
- Colours: ,
- Publication: The Spark
- Website: https://www.sggs.org.uk/

Stratford Girls' Grammar School (formerly Stratford-upon-Avon Grammar School for Girls) is a fully selective girls' grammar school in England situated in Stratford-upon-Avon.

== Admissions ==
The school has been consistently recognised as one of the top twenty state schools in England, became a Specialist Language College in 2002, and was later awarded the status of a Specialist Science College. Since 2011 the school has been awarded status as an academy school. Entry is by examination at 11, although entry may be made in later years or most commonly at sixth form level.

== History ==
The school opened in 1958. The Hugh Clopton School for Girls was given a Grammar Stream as the result of the Education Act 1944. It was one of only two bilateral schools in Warwickshire. The first and second intakes took the External School Certificate and after that when O and A Levels came into force, these were taken as a matter of course. Thanks to the sustained efforts of several women, including the first Headmistress Miss E. B. Williams, (Miss Williams was appointed Head of the bi-lateral school) the first pupils were taken from the A stream of nearby Hugh Clopton School, known today as Stratford-upon-Avon School. In August 2011 the school changed to Academy (Mainstream Converter) status and changed its official name from Stratford-upon-Avon Grammar School for Girls to Stratford Girls' Grammar School. The name Shottery, as the school is often known, came later when there were too many pupils to be accommodated in the old building. As of 2018, the school admits around 120 new Year 7 pupils per year. Competition for places is high, with more than seven applicants per place.

The original school was centred on the historic Shottery Manor, parts of which date from the 14th century. The Manor still stands today, and is used as a sixth form centre. Three additional buildings were added before the school opened, in what were originally the Manor orchards and flower gardens. The Garrett Teaching block was expanded in work that was completed in 2013. The Hargreaves building was opened in September 2016, offering a Fitness Suite, Sports Hall, dining facilities, Drama studio and History and Politics department.

== Notable former pupils ==
- Captain Helen Allkins, Matron-in-Chief of the Queen Alexandra's Royal Naval Nursing Service, and Director of Naval Nursing Services since July 2008.
- Corrie Corfield, Radio 4 continuity announcer and news reader.
- Karen Dotrice, actress, notably starred in Mary Poppins (film).
- Miranda Merron, offshore sailor.
