= Shottery =

Village in United Kingdom

Coordinates: 52°11′N 1°43′W

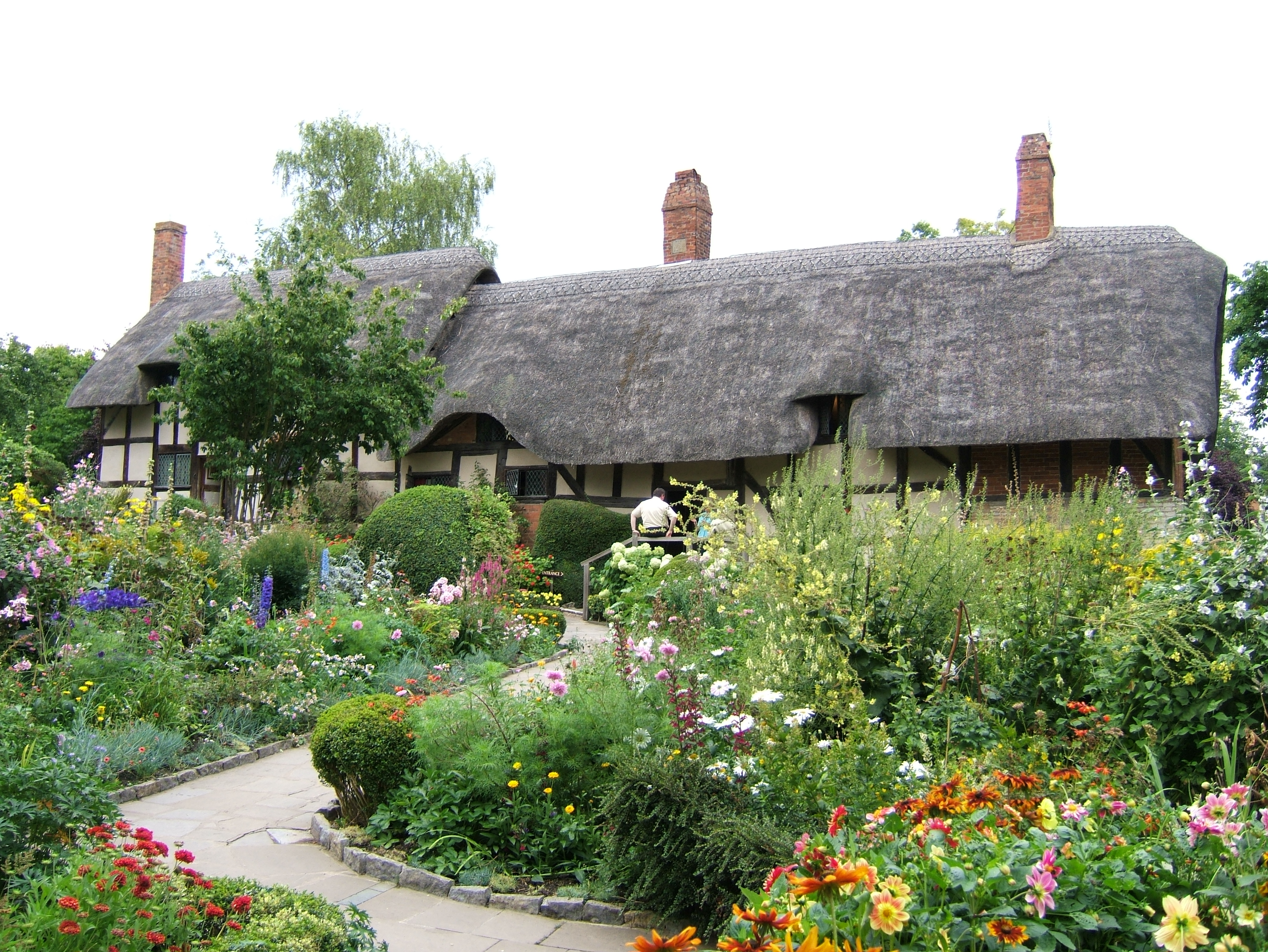
- Anne Hathaway's Cottage, a tourist attraction
- OS grid reference: SP1954
- Civil parish: Stratford-upon-Avon
- Shire county: Warwickshire
- Country: England
- Sovereign state: United Kingdom
- Postcode district: CV37
- Dialling code: 01789
- UK Parliament: Stratford-on-Avon

Shottery is a district of Stratford-upon-Avon, Warwickshire, England situated about one mile west of the town centre. It was formerly a hamlet.

Shottery is the location of Anne Hathaway's Cottage, the childhood home of Anne Hathaway. It is a popular tourist attraction.

== History and amenities ==
Shottery has a village hall, Shottery Memorial Hall, one secondary school, Stratford Girls' Grammar School, and one small primary school, Shottery St Andrew's CofE Primary School that has been open since the mid-19th century. The school has been threatened with closure numerous times due to local spending cuts; however, locals have always managed to raise the funds required to keep the school open. There is one pub (The Bell Inn). There was an Italian restaurant, the Santa Lucia, opposite the pub, but this has now closed. The latter building has long served as an eatery, and in Victorian times was a temperance movement soup kitchen. There was a Shottery Village Stores and Post Office, but it closed in the 1990s and is now a private home.

The local park, Shottery Fields, contains two football pitches and a children's play area. The Fields retain distinctive "ditch and furrow" undulations, marking medieval field systems, and these can be seen when the sun is low across the Fields. The Fields also contain a footpath to the town centre. Shottery has a Rugby Club, Shottery RFC, which is now based at Stratford Rugby Club's ground, Pearcecroft, on the Loxley Road, south Stratford. The club was founded in 1984 by the Reverend David Capron, Vicar of St Andrew's church.

Shottery was the childhood home of Anne Hathaway, William Shakespeare's wife, and is the location of the building known as Anne Hathaway's Cottage, which is a very popular tourist destination.

== Governance ==
Shottery is presently part of the civil parish of Stratford-upon-Avon, the "Hathaway" ward of Stratford-on-Avon District Council and the "Stratford West" division of Warwickshire County Council. The local MP (since the 2024 general election) is Manuela Perteghella of the Liberal Democrats.
