= Anne Hathaway's Cottage =

Historic building in Shottery, England

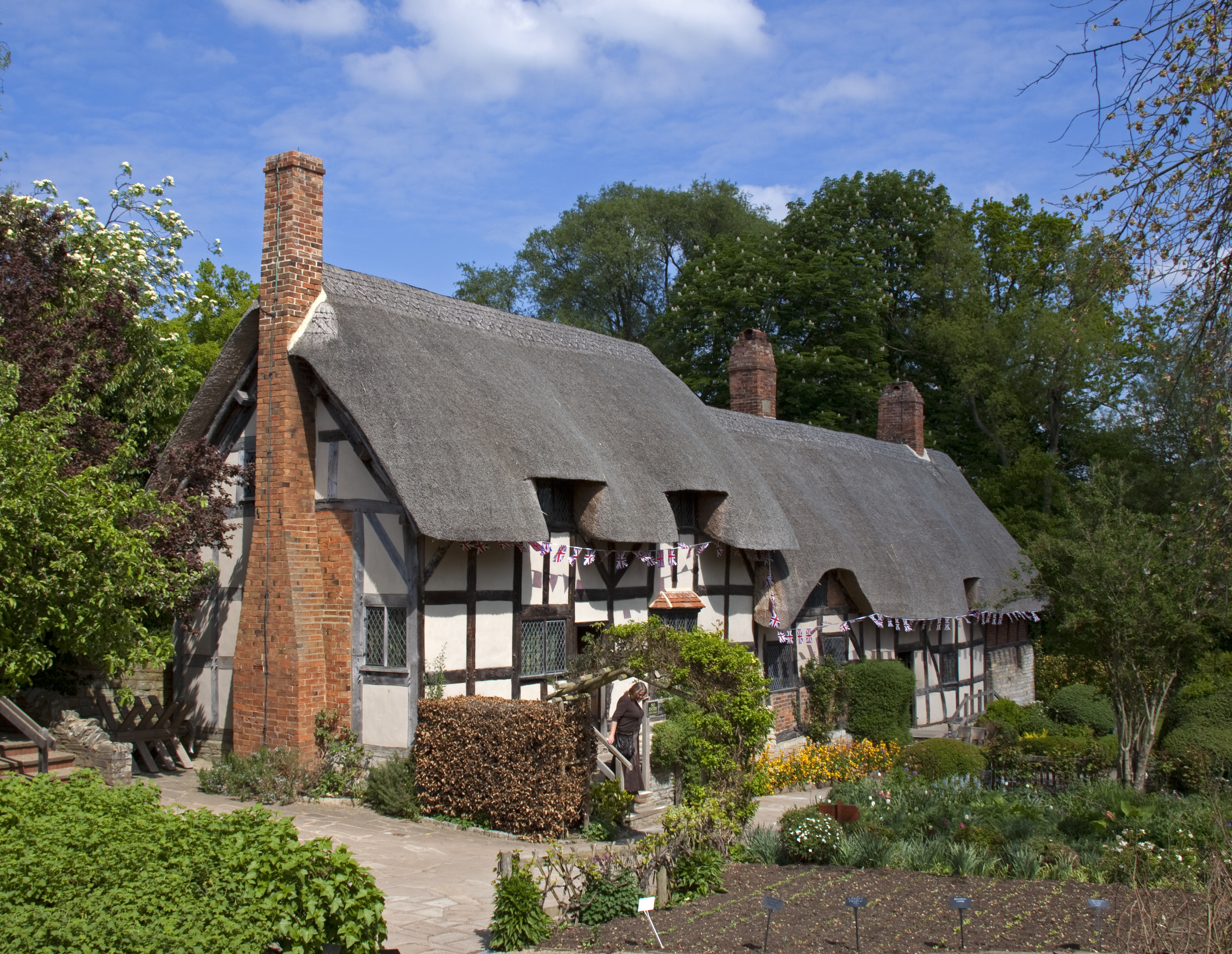
- The cottage and garden (photo 2011)
- Interactive map of Anne Hathaway's Cottage
- 52.19065°N 1.7315°W
- Location: Cottage Lane, Shottery, Warwickshire, England

History
- Built: 1463; expanded April 1610 to October 1624
- Original use: Farmhouse

Site notes
- Area: Once had over 90 acres (36 hectares) of land
- Architectural styles: Timber framing, Tudor architecture, thatched roof
- Current use: Museum
- Governing body: Shakespeare Birthplace Trust (since 1892)
- Owner: Shakespeare Birthplace Trust (since 1892)
- Website: www.shakespeare.org.uk/visit/anne-hathaways-cottage/

Listed Building – Grade I
- Official name: Anne Hathaway's Cottage
- Designated: 25 October 1951
- Reference no.: 1298551

National Register of Historic Parks and Gardens
- Official name: Anne Hathaway's Cottage
- Type: Grade II
- Designated: 1 February 1986
- Reference no.: 1001184

Anne Hathaway's Cottage is a twelve-roomed former farmhouse where Anne Hathaway, the wife of William Shakespeare, lived as a child. It is situated in Shottery about 1 mile (1.6 km) west of Stratford-upon-Avon town centre. Shottery is now a district of Stratford-upon-Avon, Warwickshire, England; however, in Shakespearean times, Shottery was a hamlet. The house, set within pleasant gardens, is a tourist attraction. It has been owned by the Shakespeare Birthplace Trust since 1892.

== History ==
The earliest part of the house dates to 1463, when it was still a three-roomed building with only one floor; the higher part is 17th century, being built between April 1610 and October 1624. The house was known as Hewlands Farm in Shakespeare's day and had more than 90 acres (36 hectares) of land attached to it; to call it a cottage is arguably a misnomer, as it is much larger than the term usually implies. As in many houses of the period, it has multiple chimneys to spread the heat evenly throughout the house during winter. The largest chimney was used for cooking. It also has visible timber framing, typical of vernacular Tudor architecture.

The Hathaway family moved there in 1542, with John Hathaway, grandfather of Anne Hathaway, being the first Hathaway to live there.

After the death of Richard Hathaway (father of Anne Hathaway) in 1581, the cottage was owned by Anne Hathaway's brother Bartholomew, who began to expand the building starting on 1 April 1610 and continuing until his death on 28 October 1624, and was passed down the Hathaway family until 1846, when financial problems, which began in 1700, forced them to sell it. However, it was still occupied by them as tenants when it was acquired in 1892 by the Shakespeare Birthplace Trust, which removed later additions and alterations; William Baker was the last to live in the property and he left when his mother Mary Baker died in 1911.

In 1969 the cottage was badly damaged in a fire, but was restored by the Trust. It is now open to the public as a museum.

== Gardens ==
In 1920, horticulturist Ellen Willmott was commissioned by the Shakespeare Birthplace Trust to advise on design and planting in the garden around the cottage, following the introduction of a large sewer which destroyed the previous garden. Her designs for the flower garden and orchard were intended to complement the buildings. Many of the plants chosen were mentioned in Shakespeare’s plays, with pastel combination in borders that remain colourful throughout the year. Much of her layout and plant choices are in place today, including the three flower beds near the cottage entrance, named Miss Willmott’s garden.

== Replicas ==
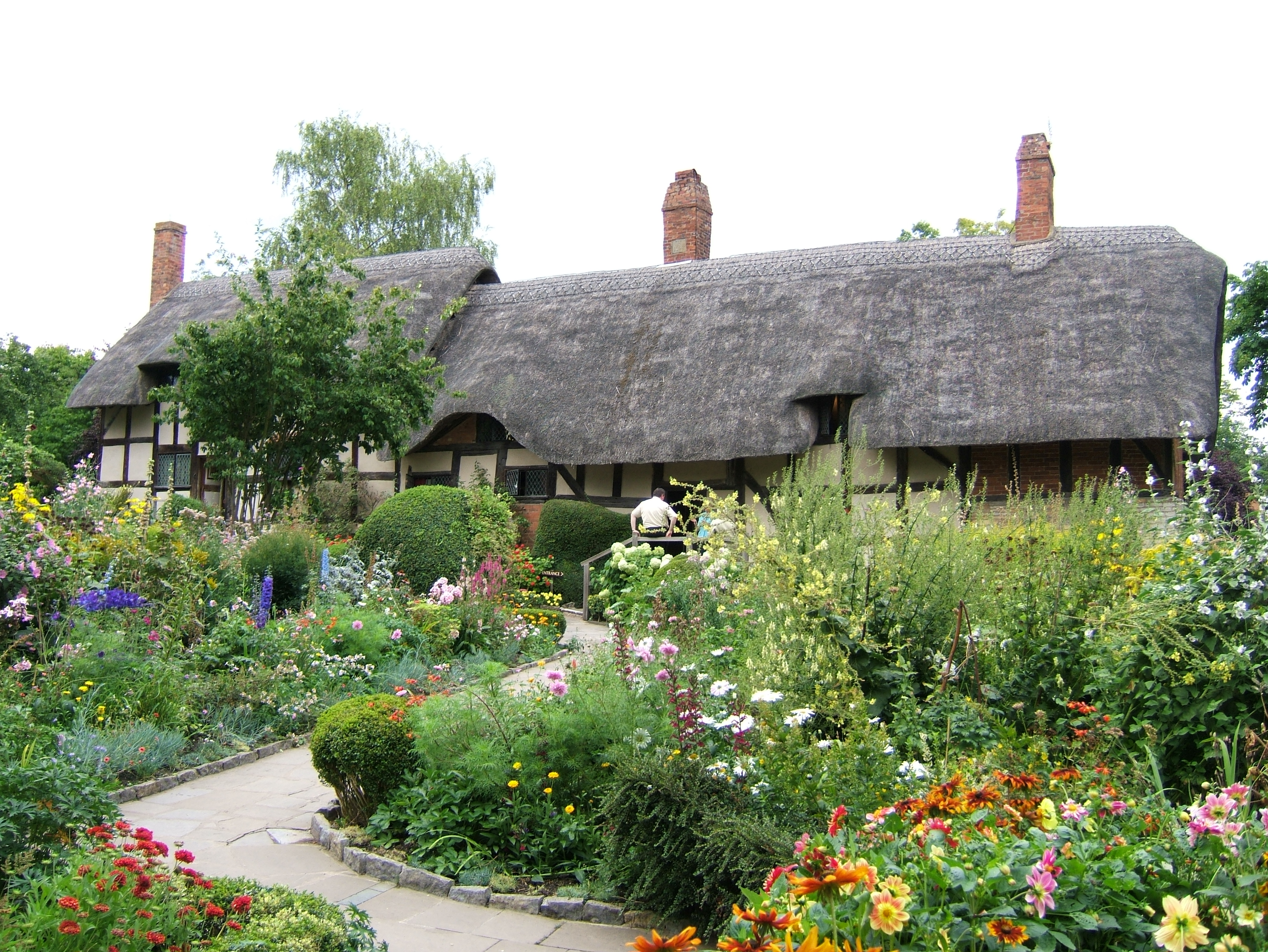
Anne Hathaway’s Cottage and garden

Full-size replicas of Anne Hathaway's cottage have been built around the world:

- Elizabethan Village, Bedfordale, Western Australia, Australia
- English Inn, Victoria, British Columbia, Canada
- Grove Park Inn’s Presidential Cottage, Asheville, North Carolina, United States
- Odessa College, Texas, United States
- Staunton, Virginia, United States
- Shakespeare Garden and Anne Hathaway Cottage, Wessington Springs, South Dakota, United States

== Sculpture Trail at Anne Hathaway's cottage and garden ==
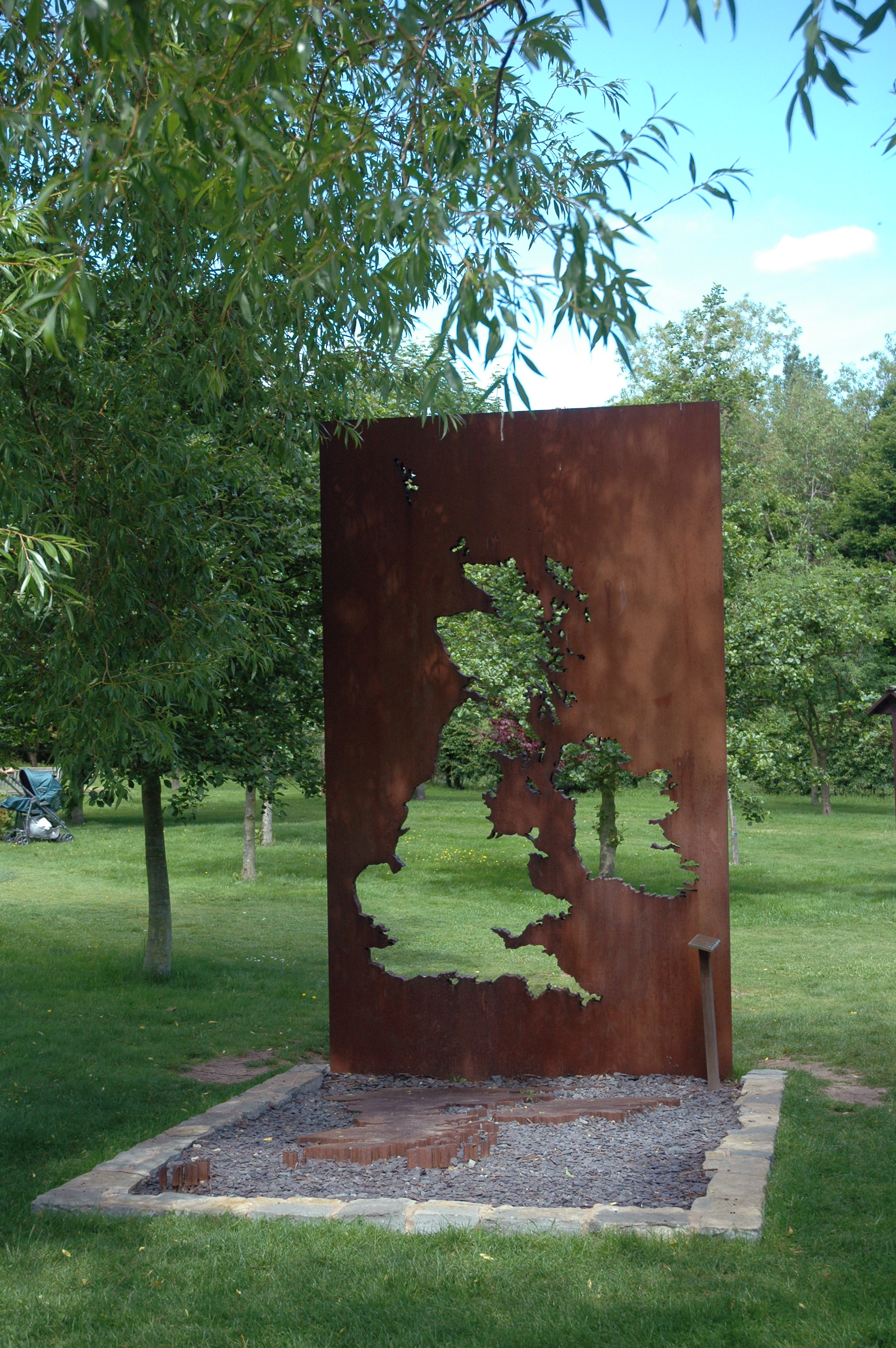
History Play
by Jane Lawrence

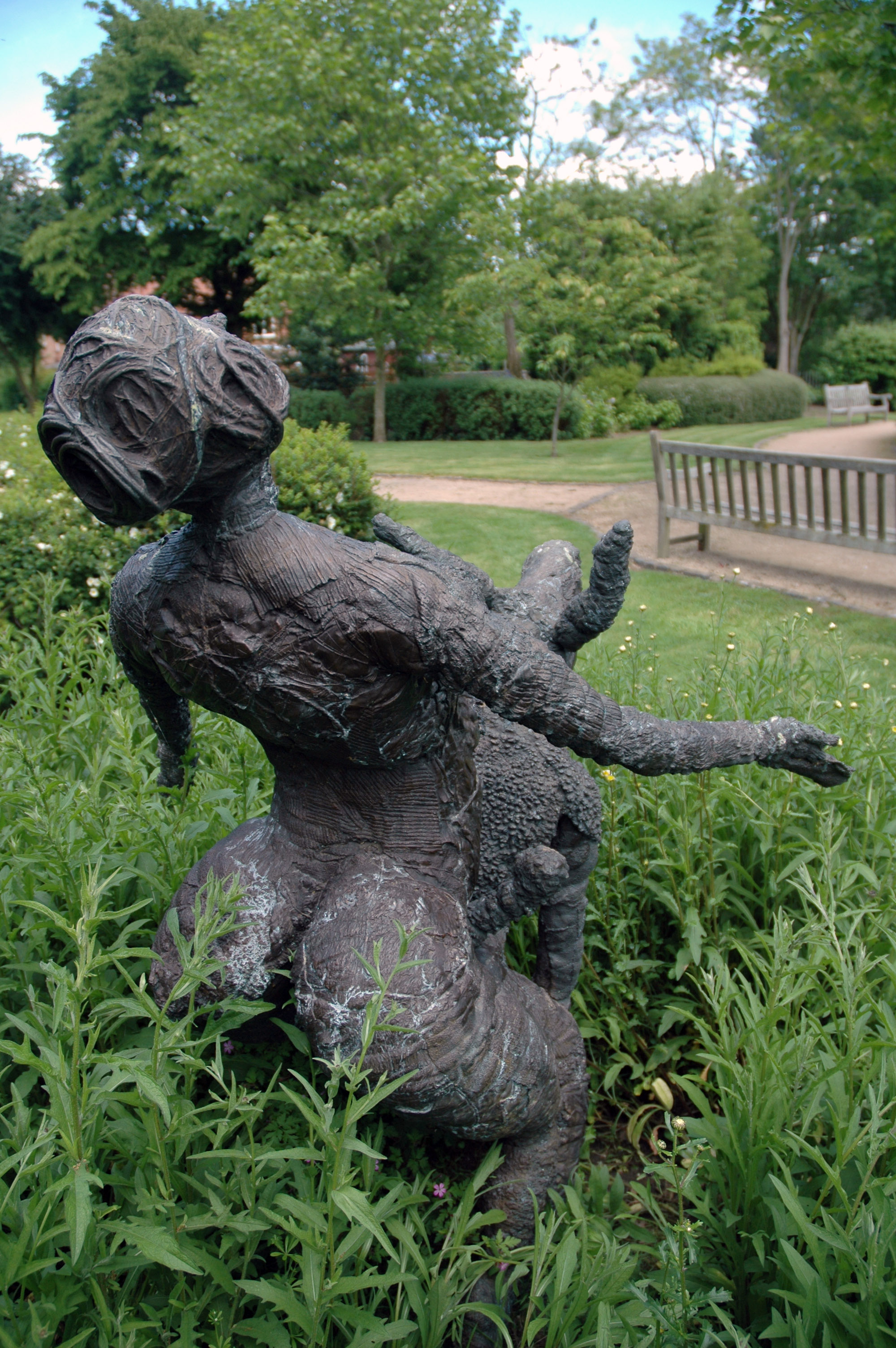
Titania and Bottom
by Gemma Smith

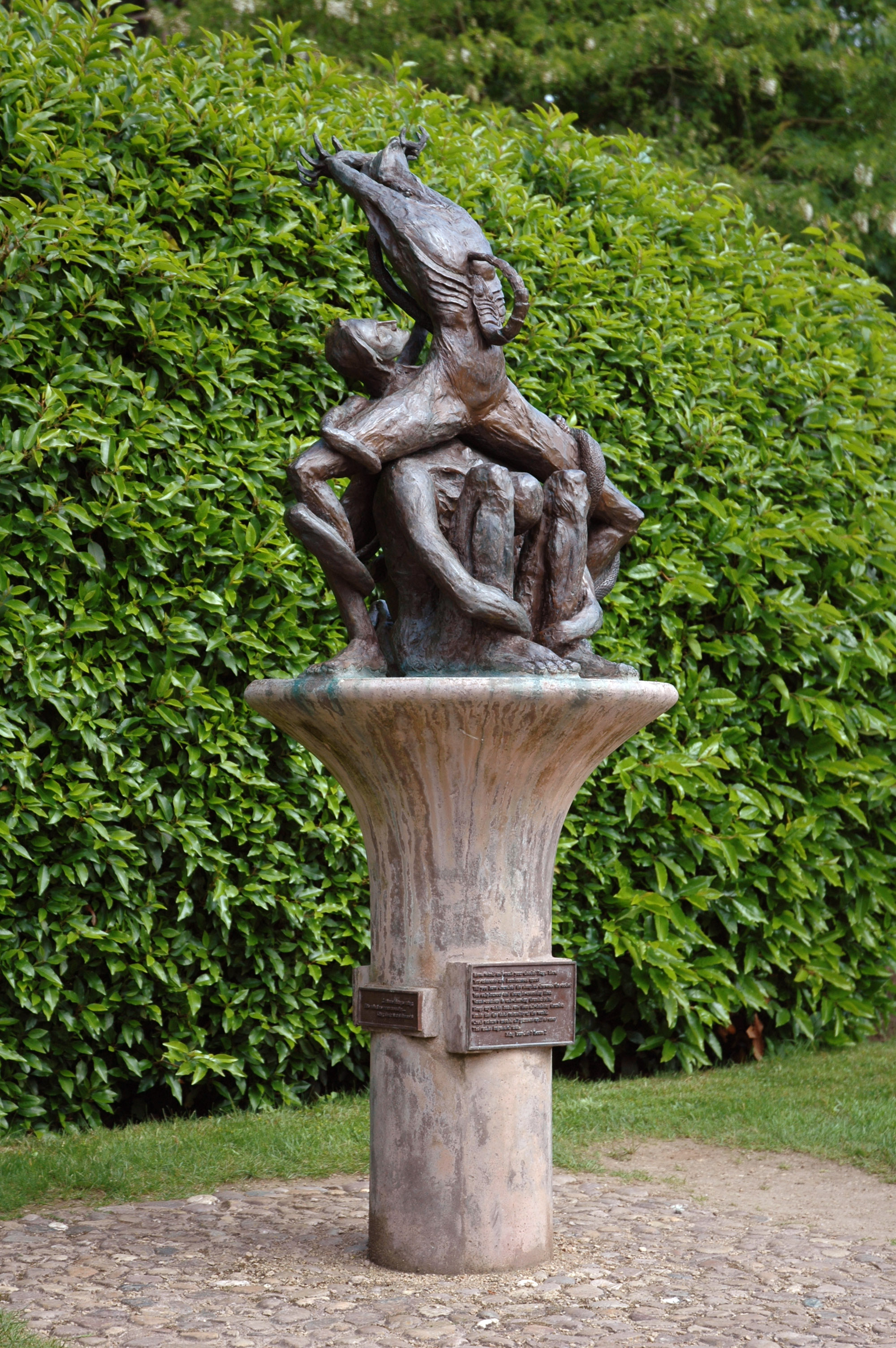
King Lear
by Eve Pomerantz

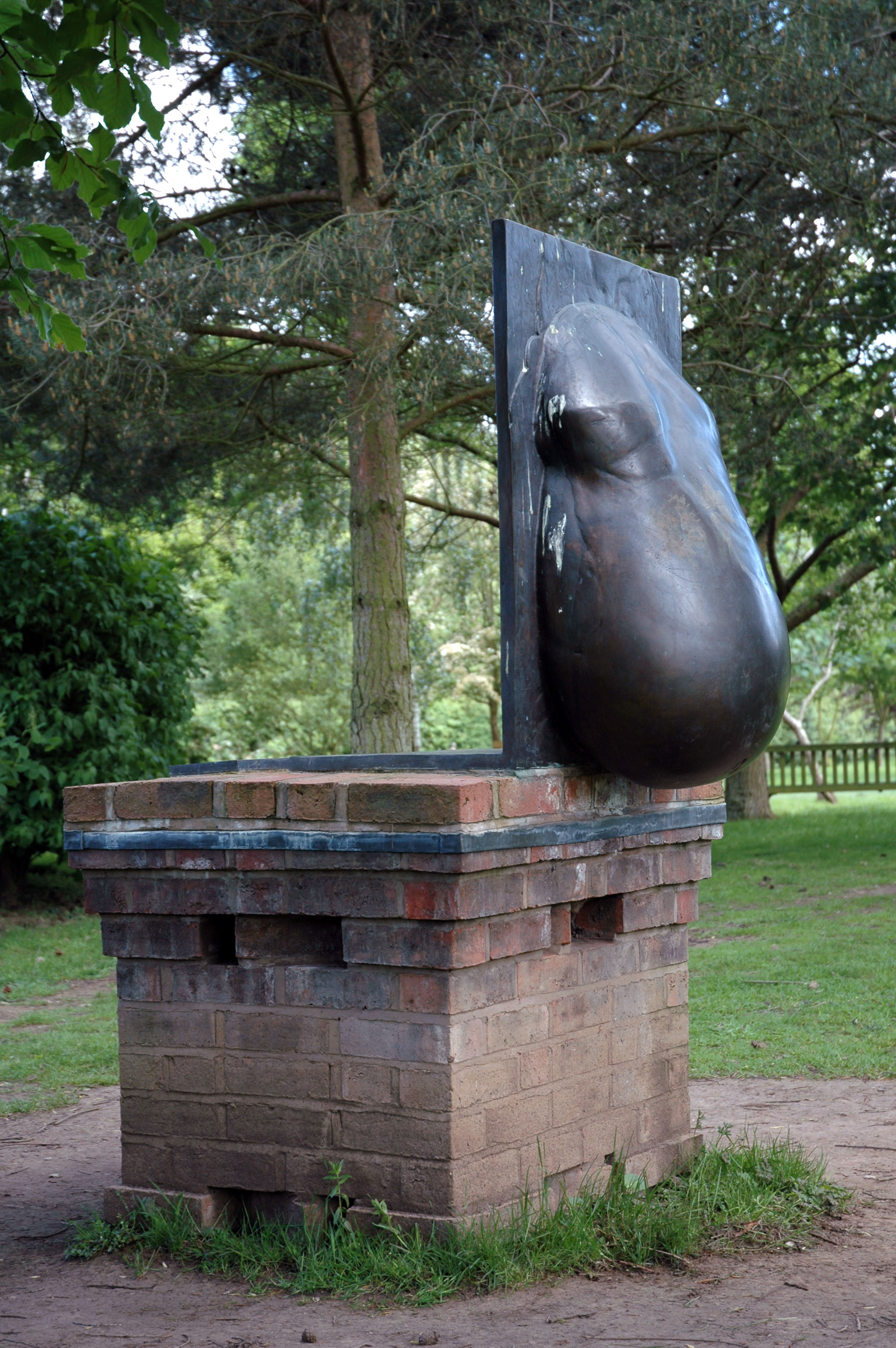
Falstaff, What is Honour
by Niels Helvig Thorsen

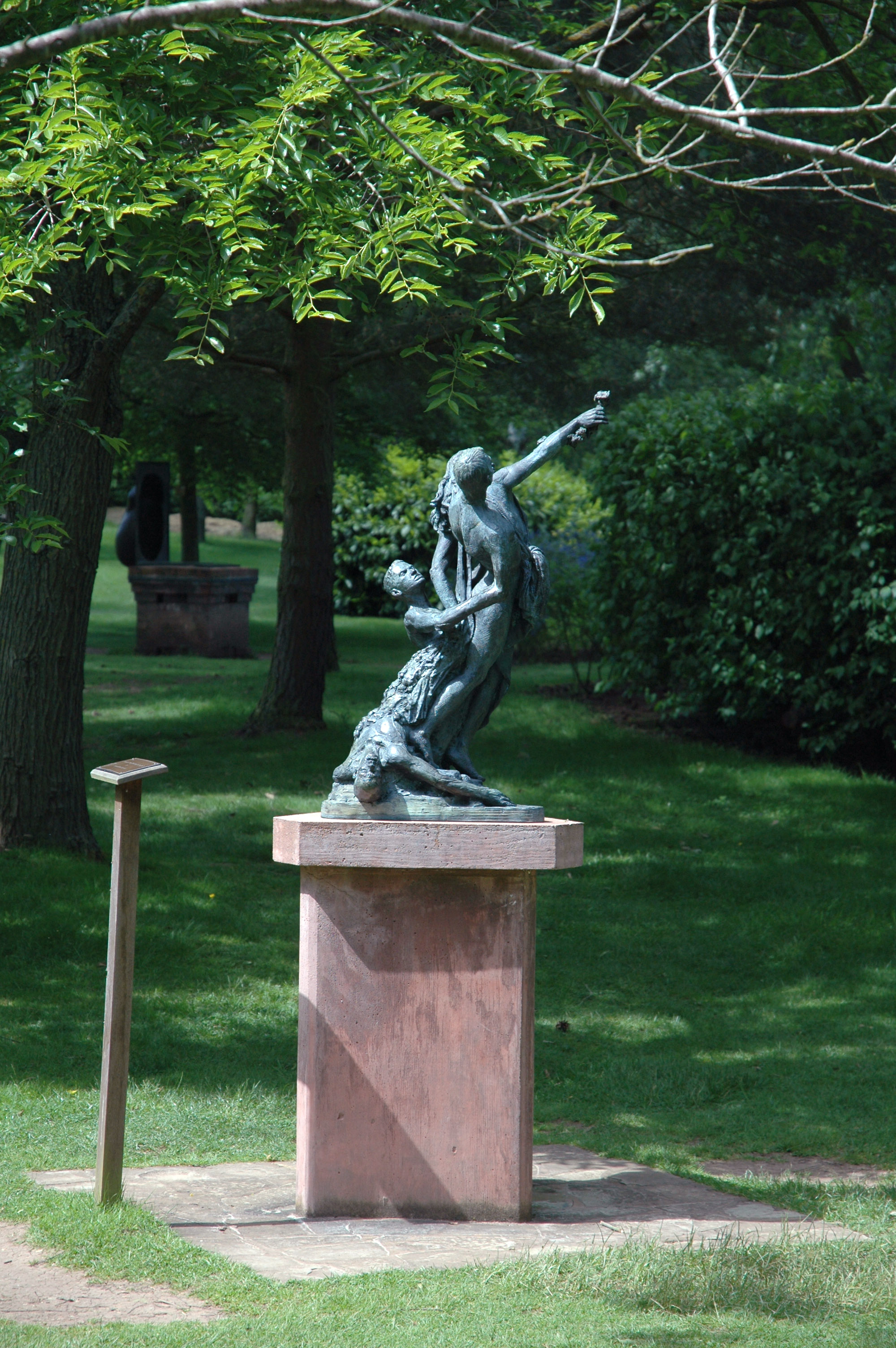
Hamlet: What Wilt Thou Do For Her
by Michele Firpo-Cappiello

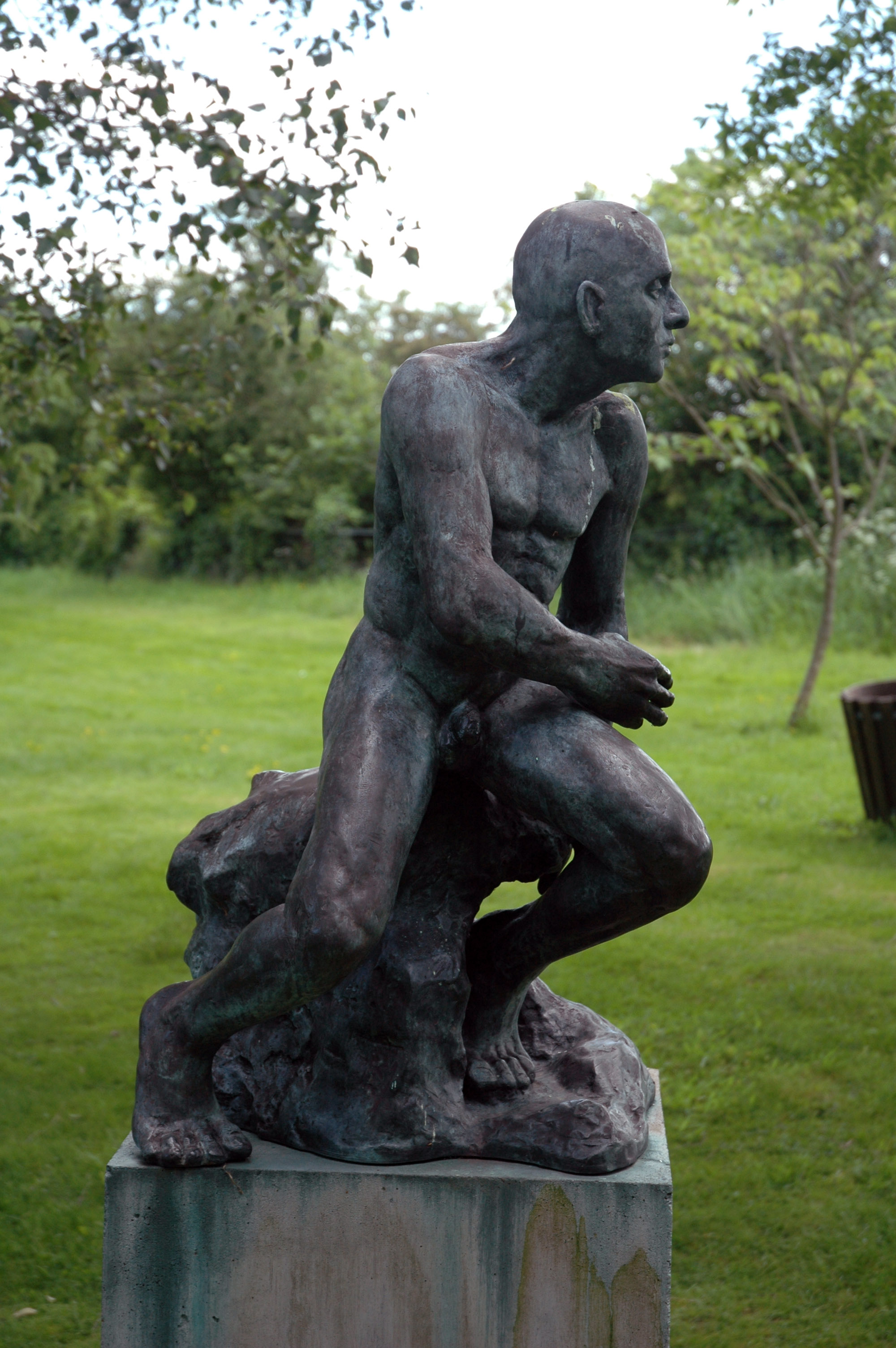
Brutus
by Isaac Graham

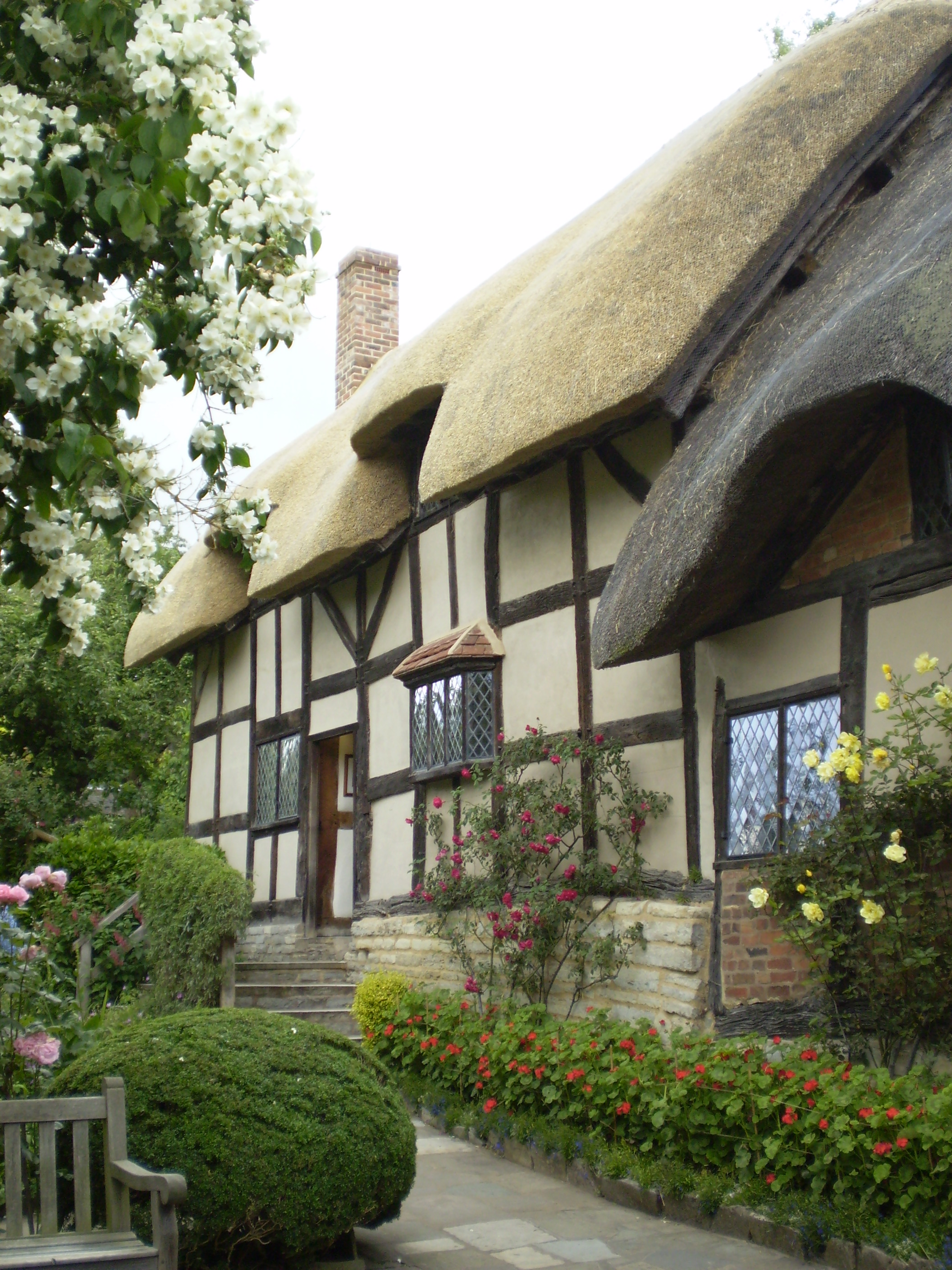
Garden path

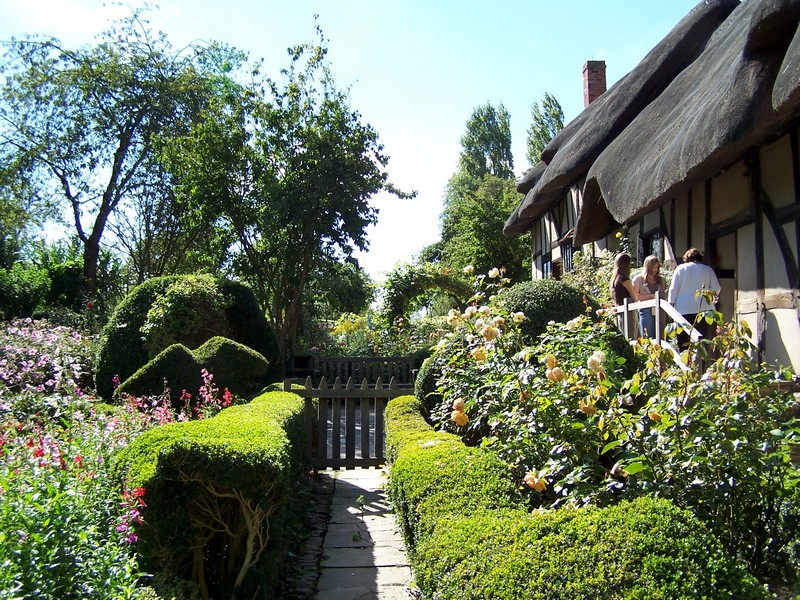
Garden path
