= Anne Hathaway (wife of Shakespeare) =

Wife of William Shakespeare (1556–1623)

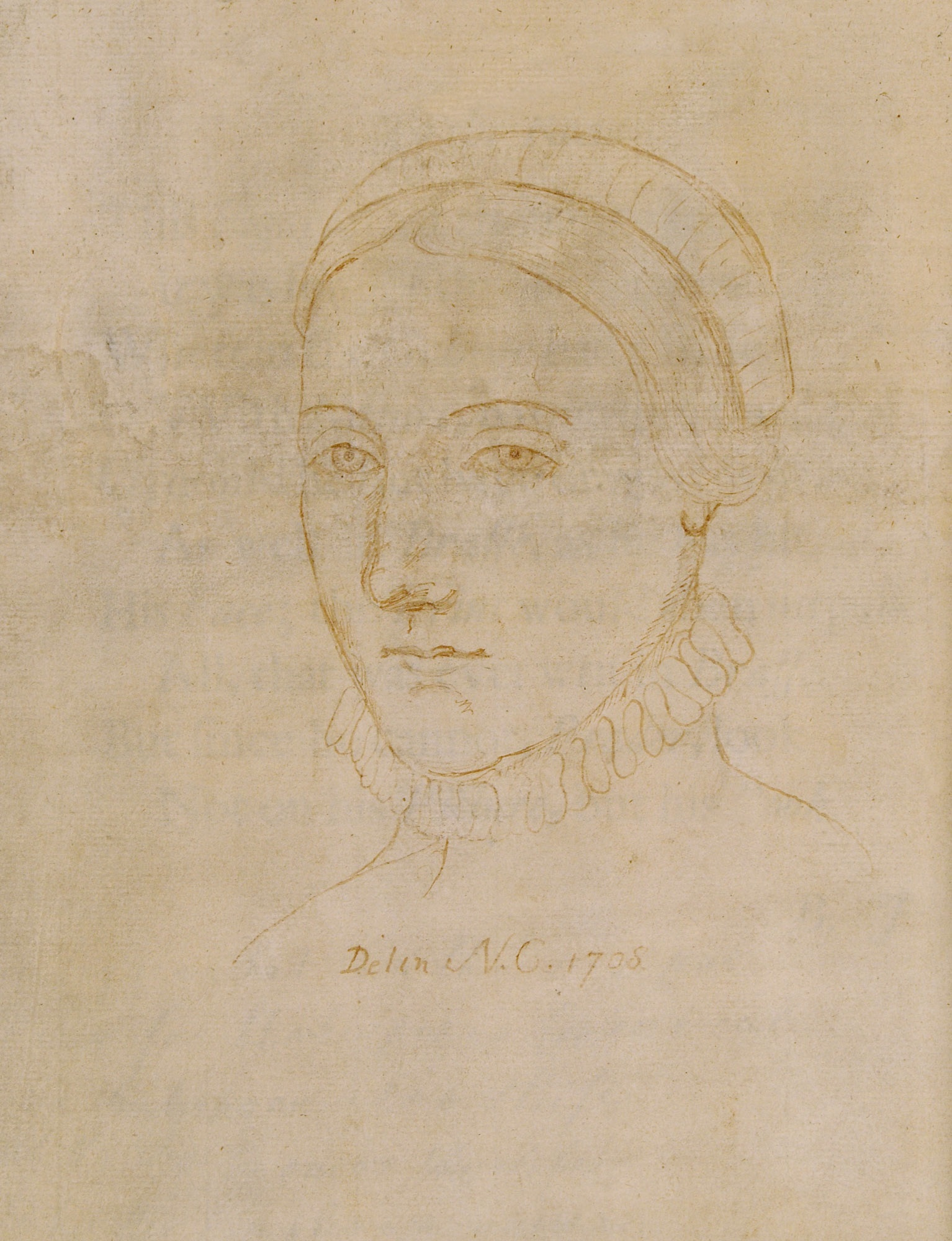
- This drawing by Nathaniel Curzon, dated 1708, purportedly depicts Anne Hathaway. Samuel Schoenbaum writes that it is probably a tracing of a lost Elizabethan portrait, but there is no existing evidence that the portrait actually depicted Hathaway.
- Born: 1556; Shottery, England
- Died: 6 August 1623 (aged 66–67); Stratford-upon-Avon, England
- Spouse: William Shakespeare (m. 1582; died 1616)
- Children: Susanna Hall; Hamnet Shakespeare; Judith Quiney

Anne Shakespeare (née Hathaway; 1556 – 6 August 1623), commonly known as Anne Hathaway and sometimes referred to as Agnes Hathaway (from her father's will), was the wife of William Shakespeare, the English poet, playwright and actor. They were married in 1582, when Hathaway was pregnant at 26 years old and Shakespeare was 18. Some writers, such as Samuel Schoenbaum, have assumed that she was rather old for an Elizabethan bride, but in fact it was normal for her contemporaries to marry in their 20s, although legally they could marry earlier. Shakespeare, on the other hand, was young for an Elizabethan bridegroom.

She outlived her husband by seven years. Very little is known about her life beyond a few references in documents. Her personality and relationship to Shakespeare have been the subject of much speculation by many historians and writers.

== Life ==
Anne Hathaway is believed to have grown up in Shottery, a village just to the west of Stratford-upon-Avon, Warwickshire. She is assumed to have grown up in the Hathaway family's farmhouse, which is located at Shottery and is now a major tourist attraction for the village. Her father, Richard Hathaway, was a yeoman farmer. He died in September 1581 and left his daughter the sum of ten marks or £6 13s 4d (six pounds, thirteen shillings and fourpence) to be paid "at the day of her marriage".

In her father's will, her first name is listed as Agnes, leading some scholars to believe that she should be referred to as Agnes Hathaway.

=== Marriage ===
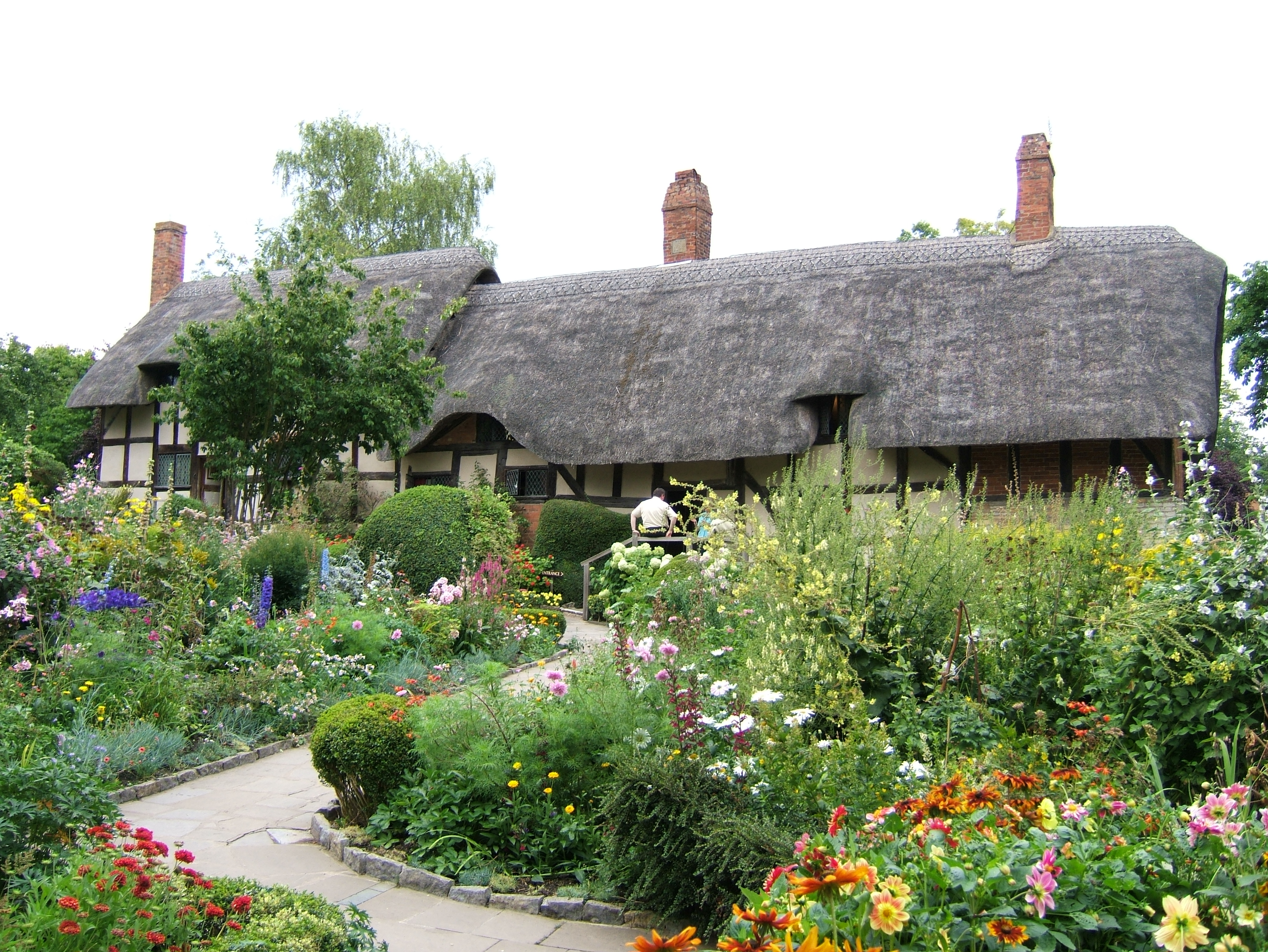
Hathaway family cottage, Shottery, Stratford-upon-Avon

Hathaway married Shakespeare in November 1582, likely November 28, while already pregnant with the couple's first child, to whom she gave birth six months later. The age difference, added to Hathaway's antenuptial pregnancy, has been employed by some historians as evidence that it was a "shotgun wedding", forced on a somewhat reluctant Shakespeare by the Hathaway family. There is, however, no other evidence for this inference.

For a time it was believed that this view was supported by documents from the Episcopal Register at Worcester, which records in Latin the issuing of a wedding licence to "William Shakespeare" and one "Anne Whateley" [sic] of Temple Grafton. The following day, Fulk Sandells and John Richardson, friends of the Hathaway family from Stratford, signed a surety of £40 as a financial guarantee for the wedding of "William Shagspere [sic] and Anne Hathwey [sic]". Frank Harris, in The Man Shakespeare (1909), argued that these documents are evidence that Shakespeare was involved with two women. He had chosen to marry one, Anne Whateley, but when this became known he was immediately forced by Hathaway's family to marry their pregnant relative. Harris believed that "Shakespeare's loathing for his wife was measureless" on account of this forced marriage, and that this was the spur to his decision to leave Stratford and pursue a career in the theatre.

However, according to Stanley Wells, writing in the Oxford Companion to Shakespeare, most modern scholars take the view that the name Whateley was "almost certainly the result of clerical error".

Germaine Greer, in Shakespeare's Wife, argues that the age difference between Shakespeare and Hathaway is not evidence that he was forced to marry her, but that he was the one who pursued her. Women such as the orphaned Hathaway often stayed at home to care for younger siblings and married in their late twenties. As a husband Shakespeare offered few prospects; his family had fallen into financial ruin, while Hathaway, from a family in good standing both socially and financially, would have been considered a catch. Furthermore, a "handfast" and pregnancy were frequent precursors to legal marriage at the time. Examining the surviving records of Stratford-upon-Avon and nearby villages in the 1580s, Greer argues that two facts stand out quite prominently: first, that a large number of brides went to the altar already pregnant; and second, that autumn, not spring, was the most common time to get married. Shakespeare was bound to marry Hathaway, who had become pregnant by him, but there is no reason to assume that this had not always been his intention. It is nearly certain that the respective families of the bride and groom had known one another.

Three children were born to Hathaway and her husband: Susanna in 1583 and the twins Hamnet and Judith in 1585. Shortly after their birth, in between 1585-1587, Willam Shakespeare moved to London. Hamnet died at 11 years old during one of the frequent outbreaks of the bubonic plague and was buried in Stratford-upon-Avon on 11 August 1596.

Apart from documents related to her marriage and the birth of her children, the only recorded reference to Hathaway in her lifetime is a curious bequest in the will of her father's shepherd, Thomas Whittington, who died in 1601. Whittington left 40 shillings to "the poor of Stratford", adding that the money was "in the hand of Anne Shakespeare wife unto Master William Shakespeare, and is due debt unto me, being paid to mine executor by the said William Shakespeare or his assigns according to the true meaning of this my will." This passage has been interpreted in several different ways. One view is that Whittington may have lent Anne the money, presumably because she was short of cash while her husband was away. More likely, however, it may have been "uncollected wages, or savings held in safekeeping", since the will also lists debts owed to him from her brothers in the same amount.

In 1607, Hathaway's daughter Susanna married the local doctor, John Hall, giving birth to Hathaway's and Shakespeare's granddaughter, Elizabeth, the following year. Judith married Thomas Quiney, who was a vintner and tavern owner from a good family, in February 1616 when she was 31 and he was 27. Shakespeare may later have disapproved of this choice when it was discovered that Quiney had got another girl pregnant; also, Quiney had failed to obtain a special wedding licence needed during Lent, leading to Judith and Thomas being excommunicated on 12 March. Soon afterwards, on 25 March 1616, Shakespeare modified his will for Judith to inherit £300 in her own name, leaving Quiney out of the will and giving most of his property to Susanna and her husband.

It has sometimes been inferred that Shakespeare came to dislike his wife, but there is no existing documentation or correspondence to support this supposition. For most of their married life, he lived in London, writing and performing his plays. However, according to John Aubrey for a period every year he returned to Stratford, where Anne is assumed to have been based. In 2025 it was suggested that Anne may at one point have lived with her husband in London, assuming that she was the recipient of a letter addressed to a "Mrs Shakspaire" known to have lived in "Trinity Lane". (The letter, which surfaced in the binding of a book printed by Richard Field, was not initially deemed to point clearly to Anne, but later analysis suggests that on the balance of probabilities, it likely refers to her). When he retired from the theatre in 1613, he chose to live in Stratford with his wife, rather than in London.

=== Shakespeare's will ===
In his will Shakespeare famously made only one bequest to his wife, his "second-best bed with the furniture". There is no reference to the "best" bed, which would have been included in the main bequest to Susanna. This bequest to Anne has often been interpreted as a slight, implying that Anne was in some sense only the "second best" person in his intimate life. A few explanations have been offered: first, it has been claimed that, according to law, Hathaway was entitled to receive one third of her husband's estate, regardless of his will, though this has been disputed. It has been speculated that Hathaway was to be supported by her children. Germaine Greer suggests that the bequests were the result of agreements made at the time of Susanna's marriage to Dr Hall: that she (and thus her husband) inherited the bulk of Shakespeare's estate. Shakespeare had business ventures with Dr Hall, and consequently appointed John and Susanna as executors of his will. Dr Hall and Susanna inherited and moved into New Place after Shakespeare's death. This would also explain other examples of Shakespeare's will being apparently ungenerous, as in its treatment of his younger daughter Judith.

There is indication that Hathaway may have been financially secure in her own right. The National Archives states that "beds and other pieces of household furniture were often the sole bequest to a wife" and that, customarily, the children would receive the best items and the widow the second-best. In Shakespeare's time, the beds of prosperous citizens were expensive affairs, sometimes equivalent in value to a small house. The bequest was thus not as minor as it might seem in modern times. In Elizabethan custom, the best bed in the house was reserved for guests. If so, then the bed that Shakespeare bequeathed to Anne could have been their marital bed, and thus not intended to insult her.

However, the will as initially drafted did not mention Anne at all. It was only through a series of additions, made on 25 March 1616, slightly less than a month before Shakespeare died, that the bequest to his wife of his "second best bed with the furniture" was made. Author Stephen Greenblatt, in Will in the World, suggests that as Shakespeare lay dying, "he tried to forget his wife and then remembered her with the second-best bed. And when he thought of the afterlife, the last thing he wanted was to be mingled with the woman he married. There are four lines carved in [Shakespeare's] gravestone in the chancel of Stratford Church: Good friend for Jesus sake forbeare, To digg the dust encloased heare: Bleste be ye man y't spares thes stones, And curst be he y't moves my bones. [Shakespeare may have] feared that his bones would be dug up and thrown in the nearby charnel house ... but he may have feared still more that one day his grave would be opened to let in the body of Anne Shakespeare."

=== Burial ===
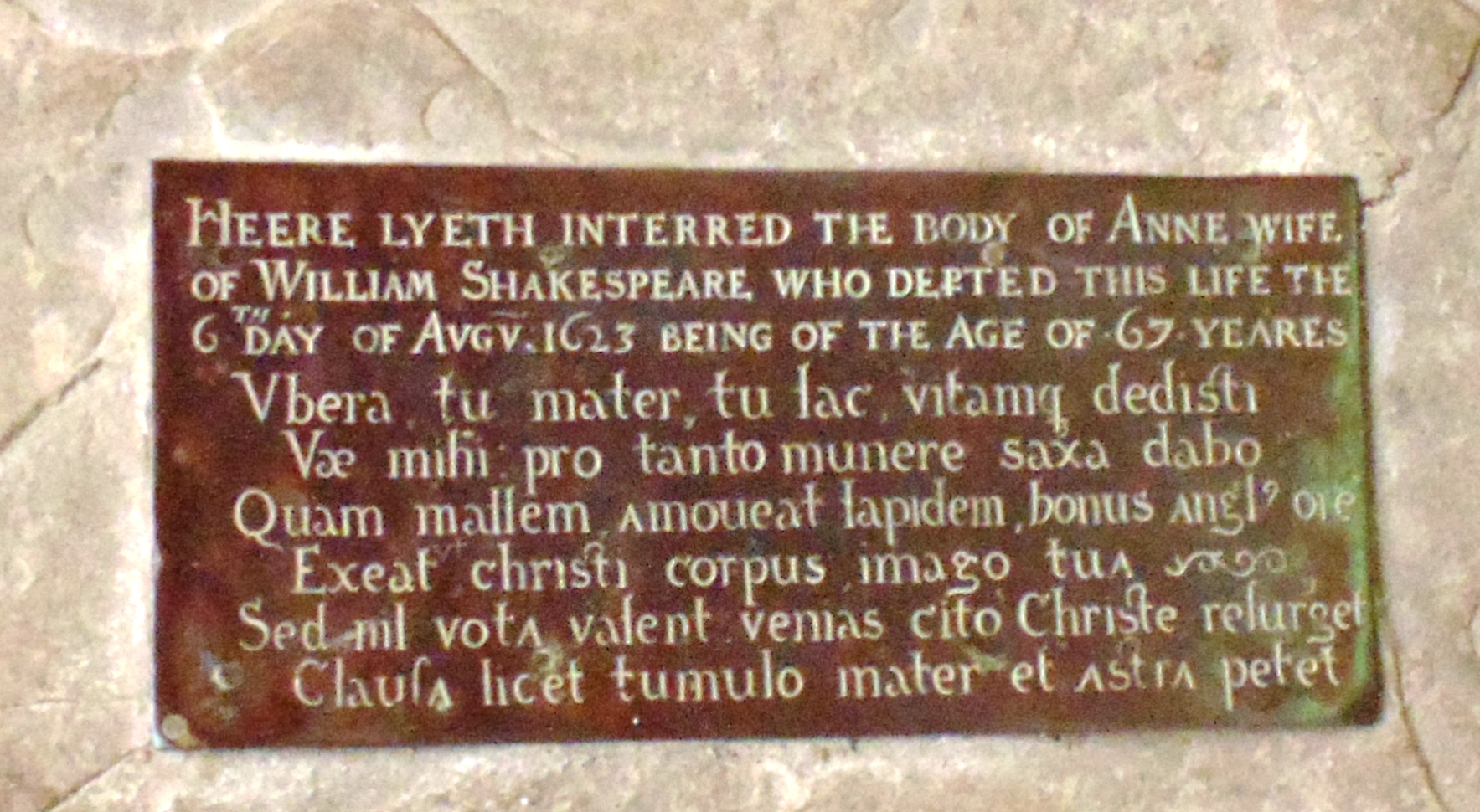
Inscribed brass on Anne Shakespeare's tombstone in the Church of the Holy Trinity, Stratford-upon-Avon

A tradition recorded in 1693 is that Hathaway "greatly desired" to be buried with her husband. In fact she was interred in a separate grave next to him in the Church of the Holy Trinity, Stratford-upon-Avon. The inscription states, "Here lyeth the body of Anne wife of William Shakespeare who departed this life the 6th day of August 1623 being of the age of 67 years." A Latin inscription followed which translates as "Breasts, O mother, milk and life thou didst give. Woe is me—for how great a boon shall I give stones? How much rather would I pray that the good angel should move the stone so that, like Christ's body, thine image might come forth! But my prayers are unavailing. Come quickly, Christ, that my mother, though shut within this tomb may rise again and reach the stars." The inscription is believed to have been written by Shakespeare's daughters Susanna and Judith, as Katherine Scheil has noted.

== In literature ==
=== Shakespeare's ===
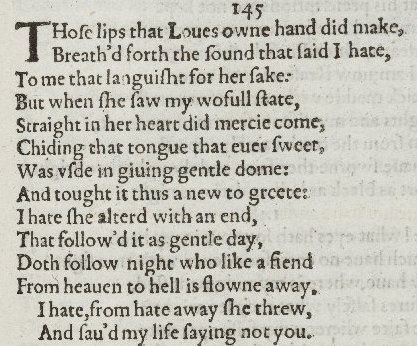
Sonnet 145, with original spelling

One of Shakespeare's sonnets, number 145, may make reference to Anne Hathaway: the words 'hate away' may be a pun on 'Hathaway'. Stephen Booth suggested that the next words, "And saved my life" could be another pun on "Anne saved my life". The sonnet differs from all the others in the length of the lines. Its fairly simple language and syntax have led to suggestions that it was written much earlier than the other, more mature, sonnets.

Those lips that Love's own hand did make
Breathed forth the sound that said 'I hate'
To me that languish'd for her sake;
But when she saw my woeful state
Straight in her heart did mercy come,
Chiding that tongue that ever sweet
Was used in giving gentle doom,
And taught it thus anew to greet:
'I hate' she alter'd with an end,
That follow'd it as gentle day
Doth follow night, who like a fiend
From heaven to hell is flown away;
'I hate' from hate away she threw,
And saved my life, saying 'not you.'

=== Other literature ===
The following poem about Hathaway has also been ascribed to Shakespeare, but its language and style are not typical of his verse. It is widely attributed to Charles Dibdin (1748–1814) and may have been written for the Stratford-upon-Avon Shakespeare Festival of 1769:

But were it to my fancy given
To rate her charms, I'd call them heaven;
For though a mortal made of clay,
Angels must love Anne Hathaway;

She hath a way so to control,
To rapture the imprisoned soul,
And sweetest heaven on earth display,
That to be heaven Anne hath a way;

She hath a way,
Anne Hathaway,—
To be heaven's self Anne hath a way.

=== In fiction ===
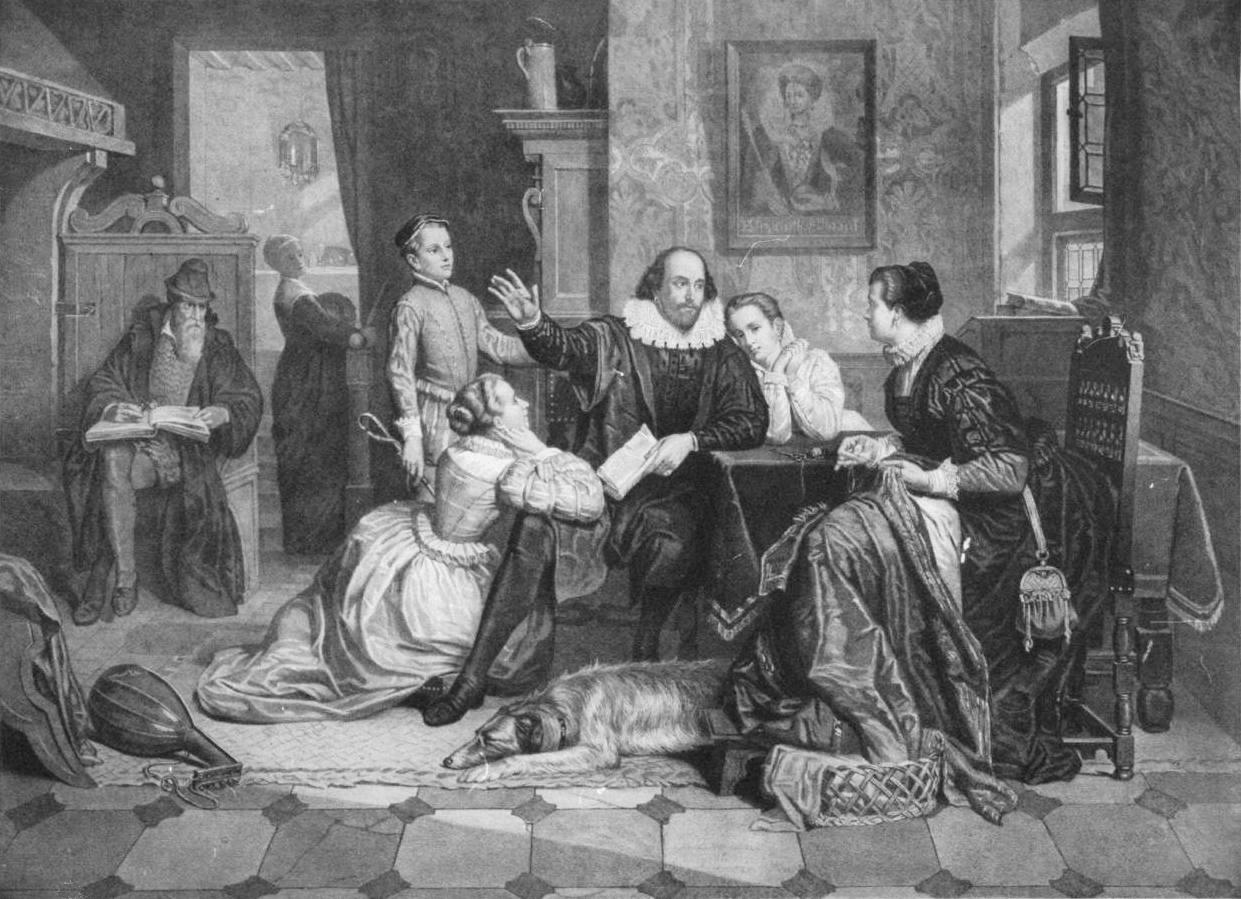
A 19th-century German engraving depicting Shakespeare as a family man surrounded by his children, who listen entranced to his stories. His wife Anne is portrayed at the right sewing a garment.

Hathaway is depicted in fiction during the 19th century, when Shakespeare started to become a figure in wider national and popular culture. Emma Severn's novel Anne Hathaway, or, Shakespeare in Love (1845) portrays an idealised romance and happy marriage in an idyllic rural Stratford. She also appears in William Black's 1884 novel Judith Shakespeare about her daughter, portrayed as a conventional dutiful wife and concerned parent with a wayward daughter.

By the early 20th century a more negative image of Hathaway emerged, following the publication of Frank Harris's books on Shakespeare's love life, and after the discovery that Hathaway was already pregnant when the couple married. A trend in literature on Hathaway in this period was to imagine her as a sexually incontinent cradle-snatcher, or, alternatively, a calculating shrew. More recent literature has included more varied representations of her. Historian Katherine Scheil describes Hathaway as a "wife-shaped void" used by modern writers "as a canvas for expressing contemporary woman's struggles—over independence, single motherhood, sexual freedom, unfaithful husbands, woman's education and power-relations between husband and wife."

An adulterous Anne is imagined by James Joyce's character Stephen Dedalus, who makes a number of references to Hathaway. In Ulysses, he speculates that the gift of the infamous "second-best bed" was a punishment for her adultery, and earlier in the same novel, Dedalus analyses Shakespeare's marriage with a pun: "He chose badly? He was chosen, it seems to me. If others have their will Ann hath a way." Anne also appears in Hubert Osborne's The Shakespeare Play (c. 1911) and its sequel The Good Men Do (1917), which dramatises a meeting between the newly widowed Anne and her supposed old rival for William's love "Anne Whateley". Anne is depicted as shrewish in the first play, and as spiteful towards her former rival in the latter. William Gibson's play A Cry of Players (1968) portrayed the young Shakespeare and Anne and was performed on Broadway (at Lincoln Center) with Frank Langella and Anne Bancroft as the couple. A frosty relationship is also portrayed in Edward Bond's play Bingo: Scenes of Money and Death (1973), about Shakespeare's last days, and in the 1978 TV series Will Shakespeare.

The World's Wife, a collection of poems by Carol Ann Duffy, features a sonnet entitled "Anne Hathaway", based on the passage from Shakespeare's will regarding his "second-best bed". Duffy chooses the view that this would be their marriage bed, and so a memento of their love, not a slight. Anne remembers their lovemaking as a form of "romance and drama", unlike the "prose" written on the best bed used by guests, "I hold him in the casket of my widow's head/ as he held me upon that next best bed". In Robert Nye's novel Mrs Shakespeare: the Complete Works, which purports to be Anne's autobiographical reminiscences, Shakespeare buys the best bed with money given to him by the Earl of Southampton. When Anne comes to London, the couple use the bed for wild sexual adventures, in which they engage in role-playing fantasies based on his plays. He refers to the bed he bequeaths her as "the second best" to remind her of the best bed of their memories. The novel was dramatised for BBC radio in 1998 with Maggie Steed playing Hathaway.

The Connie Willis short story "Winter's Tale," which combines factual information about Anne Hathaway with a fictitious Shakespeare identity theory, also characterises the nature of the relationship as loving and the bequeath of the second-best bed as romantically significant.

Anne Hathaway appears in Neil Gaiman's comic book section "The Tempest", part of The Sandman series. She and Shakespeare share a tumultuous, yet affectionate, relationship. Gaiman's interpretation suggests that Anne deliberately became pregnant to force her husband to marry her, but the context implies that neither of them ultimately regret their decision.

Through her long-running solo show Mrs Shakespeare, Will's first and last love (1989) American actress-writer Yvonne Hudson has had a long relationship with both the historical and dramatic Anne Hathaway. She depicts Anne and Will as maintaining a friendship despite the challenges inherent to their long separations and tragedies. Mining early and recent scholarship and the complete works, Hudson concurs that evidence of the couple's mutual respect is indeed evident in the plays and sonnets, along with support for the writer's infatuations and possibly adulterous relationships. Hudson also chooses the positive view of the bed bequest, sharing that "it may have been only here that I possessed William." Mrs Shakespeare explores the realities of keeping house without a husband while applying some dramatic licence. This allows Anne to have at least a country wife's understanding of her educated spouse's work as she quotes sonnets and soliloquies to convey her feelings. The 2005 play Shakespeare's Will by Canadian playwright Vern Thiessen is similar in form to Hudson's show. It is a one-woman piece that focuses on Anne Hathaway on the day of her husband's funeral. Avril Rowland's Mrs Shakespeare (2005) depicts Anne as a multi-tasking "superwoman" who runs the home efficiently while also writing her husband's plays in a businesslike partnership with him as her promoter/performer.

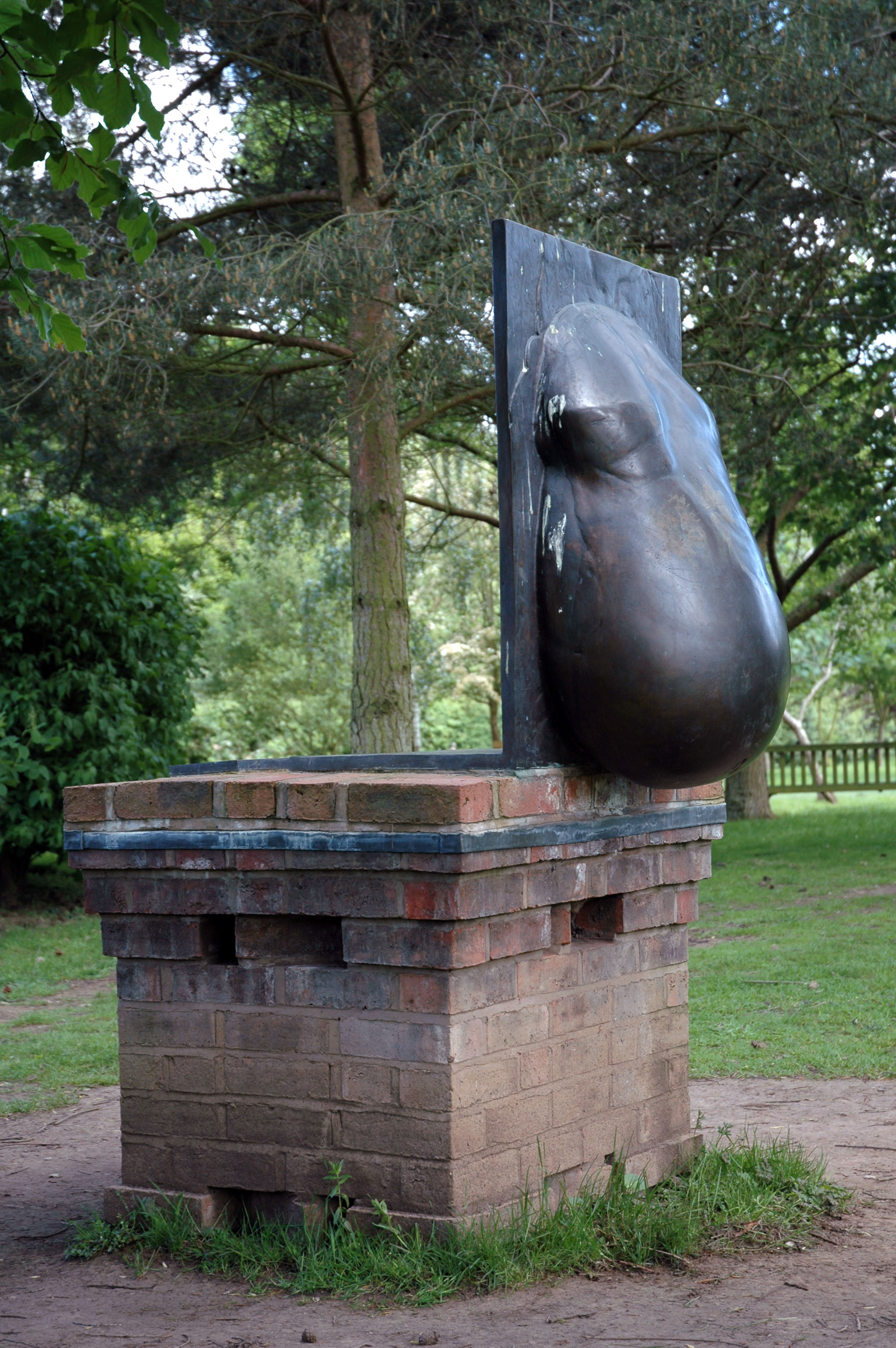
Falstaff; part of the sculpture park in the cottage garden

The romantic comedy film Shakespeare in Love provides an example of the negative view, depicting the marriage as a cold and loveless bond that Shakespeare must escape to find love in London. The same situation occurs in Harry Turtledove's alternate-history novel Ruled Britannia (2002), in which Shakespeare seeks and actually wins a divorce from Hathaway to marry his new girlfriend. A similarly loveless relationship is depicted in the film A Waste of Shame (2005).

The Secret Confessions of Anne Shakespeare (2010), a novel by Arliss Ryan, also proposes Anne Hathaway as the true author of many of the Shakespeare plays (a claim originally made in 1938). In the novel, Anne follows Will to London to support his acting career. As he finds his true calling in writing, Anne's own literary skills flower, leading to a secret collaboration that makes William Shakespeare the foremost playwright in Elizabethan England.

She is portrayed by Liza Tarbuck in the BBC Two comedy series Upstart Crow. She is shown as a rather dowdy uneducated woman significantly older than Shakespeare, but their marriage is fairly amicable with Shakespeare frequently travelling back to Stratford to visit his extended family.

Anne Hathaway is portrayed by Judi Dench in the 2018 historical film All Is True.

Anne Hathaway is portrayed by actress Cassidy Janson in the musical & Juliet. The show opened in the West End on 20 November 2019. The show transferred to Broadway in 2022. It officially opened on 17 November 2022. In the Broadway and Australian production, Anne is portrayed by Betsy Wolfe and Amy Lehpamer, respectively. In the German production, opening in 2024 in Hamburg, she was portrayed by Willemijn Verkaik and Sabrina Weckerlin. The show will transfer to Stuttgart in autumn 2026, it is yet to be announced who will star as Anne in the upcoming production. The play is a modern take on the classical plot of Romeo and Juliet, in which Anne has her own thoughts on her husband's story and gives it a feminist twist. She is portrayed as a strong-willed, smart woman that had to manage her daily struggles on her own, without her absent husband.

Anne Hathaway is a main character in Maggie O'Farrell's 2020 novel Hamnet, centred around Hamnet's death. The novel uses the name Agnes Shakespeare. It won the Women's Prize for Fiction in the same year. The character of Agnes Shakespeare is portrayed by Jessie Buckley in Chloé Zhao's 2025 film adaptation of the same name. For her portrayal of Agnes, Buckley earned several accolades, including the Golden Globe Award for Best Actress in a Drama and Academy Award for Best Actress.

Martha Howe-Douglas portrayed Anne Hathaway in the comedy film Bill.

A poetry anthology about Anne Hathaway, titled Anne-thology, was released by Broken Sleep Books in 2023, edited by Paul Edmondson, Aaron Kent, Chris Laoutaris, and Katherine Scheil, featuring poetry by poets such as Carol Ann Duffy, U. G. Világos, Roger Pringle, John Agard, and Imtiaz Dharker. Anne-thology was chosen as a Guardian Book of the Year 2023, and a Daily Telegraph book of the year 2023.

== Anne Hathaway's Cottage ==
Anne Hathaway's childhood was spent in a house near Stratford-upon-Avon in Warwickshire, England. Although it is often called a cottage, it is, in fact, a spacious twelve-roomed farmhouse, with several bedrooms, now set in extensive gardens. It was known as Hewlands Farm in Shakespeare's day and had more than 90 acres (36 hectares) of land attached to it. As in many houses of the period, it has multiple chimneys to spread the heat evenly throughout the house during winter. The largest chimney was used for cooking. It also has visible timber framing, a trademark of vernacular Tudor architecture.

After the death of Anne's father, the cottage was owned by Anne's brother Bartholomew, and was passed down the Hathaway family until 1846, when financial problems forced them to sell it. It is now owned and managed by the Shakespeare Birthplace Trust, and is open to public visitors as a museum.
