= Portrait of Anne Hathaway =

Drawing that may depict Shakespeare's wife

Shakespear's Consort
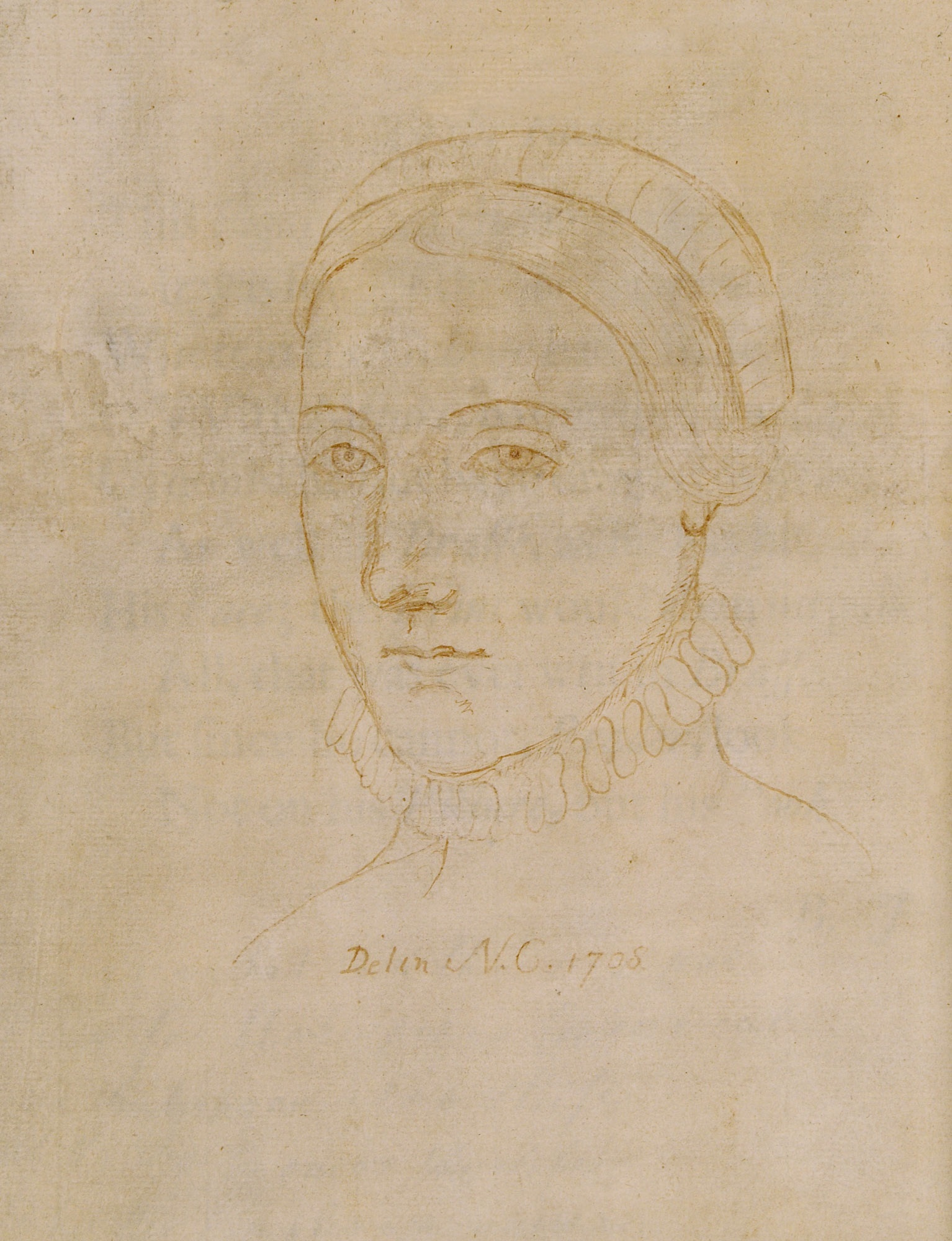
- Artist: Nathaniel Curzon (based on unknown original)
- Year: 1708
- Type: Pencil
- Location: Colgate University Libraries, Special Collections and University Archives; Hamilton, New York

The only surviving image that may depict Anne Hathaway (1555/56 – 6 August 1623), the wife of William Shakespeare, is a portrait line-drawing made by Sir Nathaniel Curzon in 1708, referred to as "Shakespear's Consort". It was probably traced from a lost Elizabethan original. The drawing is currently located in the Colgate University Libraries, Special Collections and University Archives, Hamilton, NY.

The image of the young woman with a 16th-century cap and ruff is contained on the verso of the original title page in the Colgate collection's copy of the Third Folio (1663) of Shakespeare's works. Beneath it is inscribed "Delin N.C. 1708". "Delin" is an abbreviation of the Latin "delineavit", meaning "drawn by".

== Sir Nathaniel Curzon ==
This edition originally belonged to Sir Nathaniel Curzon, Baronet, (1636-1719), who married Sarah, daughter of William Penn of Buckinghamshire. The work was handed down through the family to Curzon's great grandson, the Honourable Robert Curzon (1774-1863). His name is hand-printed in black ink on the top left of the initial flyleaf, "R. Curzon. 1850", and he wrote as marginalia on the second flyleaf:

The manuscript verses on the next page
refer to a drawing of Anne Hathaway which
had been made on the back of the blank 1st
title ----, by my great grandfather Sir Nathaniel
Curzon of Keddlestone. This drawing was
almost obliterated, and the remains of it are
concealed by mounting the page which was
loose, in the old family copy of this book = = =
The printed verses are most rare, if not unique
in this form, I have never met with another
specimen, they were intended for the very
rare edition of 1663 printed without the
seven additional plays for Philip Chetwinde
This copy seems to be Chetwinde's edition as
it has the title page, as well as the common
one, and it has the 7 additional plays
added at the end with a separate pagination

As interesting is Curzon’s first attempt at penciling an explanatory note on the first blank recto, presumably made prior to the existing description above. Apparently, he started too far down the page and his script was too large for the remaining area since he ran out of space before finishing it. He erased it and started anew on the second flyleaf as reproduced above. However, a faint impression remains and George M. Friend, writing in 1972, examined the Folio first-hand and made out the following, which interestingly recounts that the image was “faintly traced.”

The manuscript verses on the
first leaf refer to a drawing
which was very faintly traced
on the title, which together
with the first three leaves was
loose, and were all mounted
to preserve them from further
damage. The first title of
all is of very faint clarity [?]
as is also the leaf of verses
and only occurs in the 1st…[undecipherable text]

The "Philip Chetwinde" mentioned was the publisher of the Third Folio. As Curzon notes, the 1664 version of his edition contained seven extra plays, listed on an added title page, not included in earlier editions. The verses referred to are found on the third flyleaf beneath Ben Jonson's verse referencing Martin Droeshout's famous portrait engraving of Shakespeare on the facing page. Inscribed in ink by Sir Nathaniel, followed by his initials and the year 1708, they are:

This figure, that thou there seest put

It was for Shakespear's Consort cut

Wherein the Graver had a strife

With Nature to outdo the Life

O had he Her Complexion shewn

As plain as He's the outline Drawn

The plate, believe me, would surpass

All that was ever made in brass
N.C. 1708

These lines are a pastiche of Jonson's poem about the Droeshout portrait, replicating several of its lines verbatim.

== Provenance ==
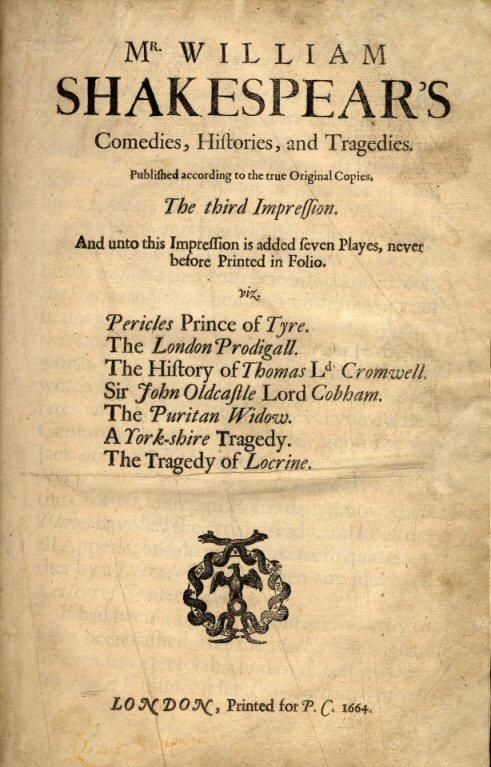
The title page of the 1664 Third Folio, using the spelling of Shakespeare's name that was preferred in the English Augustan era, and which is used by Curzon. The "7 additional plays" mentioned in the inscription are listed here.

The volume in question is in a nineteenth-century binding with the baronial seal of Robert Curzon, 14th Baron Zouche of Harringworth, stamped in the center of its front cover. It incorporates the motto LET • CURZON • HOLDE WHAT • CVRZON • HELDE • encircled around it. The implication is that the volume would remain within the Curzon family and that Robert Curzon’s notes were intended for future Curzon family members.

Despite Curzon’s intentions, in the early 20th century, rare book collector James C. Colgate (23 May 1863 - 26 February 1944) purchased the volume. A longtime member of the board of trustees, he gave the Curzon Third Folio, along with 55 other volumes of Shakespeare including the First, Second and Fourth Folios, to Colgate University in 1942.

The Third Folio is extremely rare, more so than the First Folio, due to a large number of copies having been destroyed in the Great Fire of London in 1666. In this Third Folio on the initial flyleaf, under Robert Curzon's printed name, someone - a bookseller or Colgate - wrote in pencil several paragraphs about the volume's provenance and its unique contents, noting, "The portrait is also signed and dated 1708, but it is quite obvious that it is copied from some Elizabethan or Jacobean painting or drawing that is now unknown to exist."

== Authenticity ==
There is no independent evidence that the original portrait traced by Curzon depicted Hathaway. Samuel A. Tannenbaum's editorial in the Shakespeare Association Bulletin, discussing the Colgate acquisition in 1942, suspected that the "whole business (portrait, notation, and verses) is probably a comparatively modern fake" on the grounds of oddities in the text and handwriting, notably the fact that the ink inscription seemed to have been covering an earlier version in pencil and that parts of it seemed "meaningless or absurd". However, the bulletin reserved judgement.

Later scholars have not supported the forgery theory. Assistant Professor of English George M. Friend, funded by the Colgate Research Council, conducted an investigation documented in 1972. After seeing the drawing in 1969, Agnes Mongan, a curator at Harvard University's Fogg Art Museum and an authority on drawings, stated that there was “no doubt about the drawing being eighteenth century” based on a January 1970 report written by Marjorie B. Cohn, Fogg’s Conservator of Works on Paper, which reads as follows:

I looked at the Shakespeare folio drawing of Anne Hathaway. The drawing looks to me entirely appropriate for the 1708 date; I don’t see any reason to think the initials and date were added later. The drawing has the sort of flatness and regularity of line I usually associate with a copy, so the tale of it being a copy of an earlier picture is reasonable enough. The ink of the inscription and the bulk of the drawing seem identical.

Finally, Friend draws the following conclusion: “Since the entire tradition of worshipping everything connected with Shakespeare was only a development of the late eighteenth and nineteenth centuries, it is improbable that Sir Nathaniel or his source for the drawing were products of infatuation or that they intended to deceive. One hopes that what was at work was a genuine curiosity and an amateur’s disinterested wish to preserve a human image.”

However, the fact that the lines accompanying it are a pastiche of Jonson's lines on Shakespeare led the Shakespeare scholar Samuel Schoenbaum to conclude that the drawing was probably a playful attempt to create a parallel image to that of the poet himself, though since it was almost certainly a copy of an authentic Elizabethan portrait, the "exciting" possibly that the original actually depicted Hathaway could not be ruled out. Schoenbaum states:

Did Curzon copy a portrait - long since vanished - of a young, soberly attractive woman of times past, and playfully offer it as an imago vero of Shakespeare's wife? That is more plausible (given the facetious tone of the verses) than a theory of deliberate imposition in the manner of the later fabricators; more plausible too than the infinitely exciting hypothesis that Curzon had somehow stumbled upon an authentic portrait of Anne Hathaway.

Schoenbaum also notes that Curzon seemingly did not know the name of Shakespeare's wife (as she is simply called "Shakespear's Consort"). The drawing was made a year before Nicholas Rowe published the first biography of Shakespeare in which her family name was given.

Park Honan also takes the view that the drawing "is less likely to be an authentic portrait than a playful sketch of Anne Shakespeare in her Elizabethan cap and ruff."

== See also ==
- Portraits of Shakespeare
- Marlowe portrait
