= Anne Hathaway (poem) =

Poem by Carol Ann Duffy

- by Carol Ann Duffy
- Publication date: 1999

"Anne Hathaway" is a poem by Carol Ann Duffy about Anne Hathaway, the wife of William Shakespeare.

== Overview ==
This poem, a sonnet, appears in The World's Wife, published in 1999, a collection of poems. The poem is based on the famous passage from Shakespeare's will regarding his "second-best bed". Duffy chooses the view that this would be their marriage bed, and so a memento of their love, not a slight. Anne remembers their lovemaking as a form of "romance and drama", unlike the "prose" written on the best bed used by guests, "I hold him in the casket of my widow's head/ as he held me upon that next best bed".

In The Second Best Bed and the Legacy of Anne Hathaway, Katherine Scheil describes it as "… [centering] on an intimate relationship between the Shakespeares and the second best bed: 'The bed we loved in was a spinning world / of forests, castles, torchlight, clifftops, seas / where he would dive for pearls' while 'In the other bed, the best, our guests dozed on, / dribbling their prose'". She sees Duffy's poem as belonging to a category of recent takes on Anne Hathaway that "… have used the 'second- best bed' as an inspiration for imagining some sort of connection (emotional, sexual, or both) between the Shakespeares."

The format of the sonnet breaks the regular tradition, it ends on a rhyming couplet; "I hold him in the casket of my widow's head/as he held me upon that next best bed". It creates a fluency in the poem for the reader which engages emotion. The soft imagery of a body being a "softer rhyme" and his touch "dancing in the centre of a noun" allows for a mixture of gentleness and linguistics - softening female sensuality and a soft love between the two. Their bed is described as a "spinning world", suggesting it was comparable to some exciting global theatre with a love on display, referencing settings in Shakespeares actual works.

== Notes and references ==
=== References ===
- Scheil, Katherine (2009). "The Second Best Bed and the Legacy of Anne Hathaway". Critical Survey. 21 (3, Shakespeare and 'the personal story'): 59–71. doi:10.3167/cs.2009.210305. eISSN 1752-2293. ISSN 0011-1570. JSTOR 41556328.

== Bibliography ==
- Carol Ann Duffy (2000). The World's Wife Poems. Pan Macmillan Adult. ISBN 978-0-330-37222-0.
