= John Boulcott =

John Boulcott may refer to:

- John Ellerker Boulcott (1784–1855), London merchant and shipowner
- John Roberts Boulcott (1826–1915), English organist and inventor
