= Great Malvern Priory =

Church in Malvern, Worcestershire, England

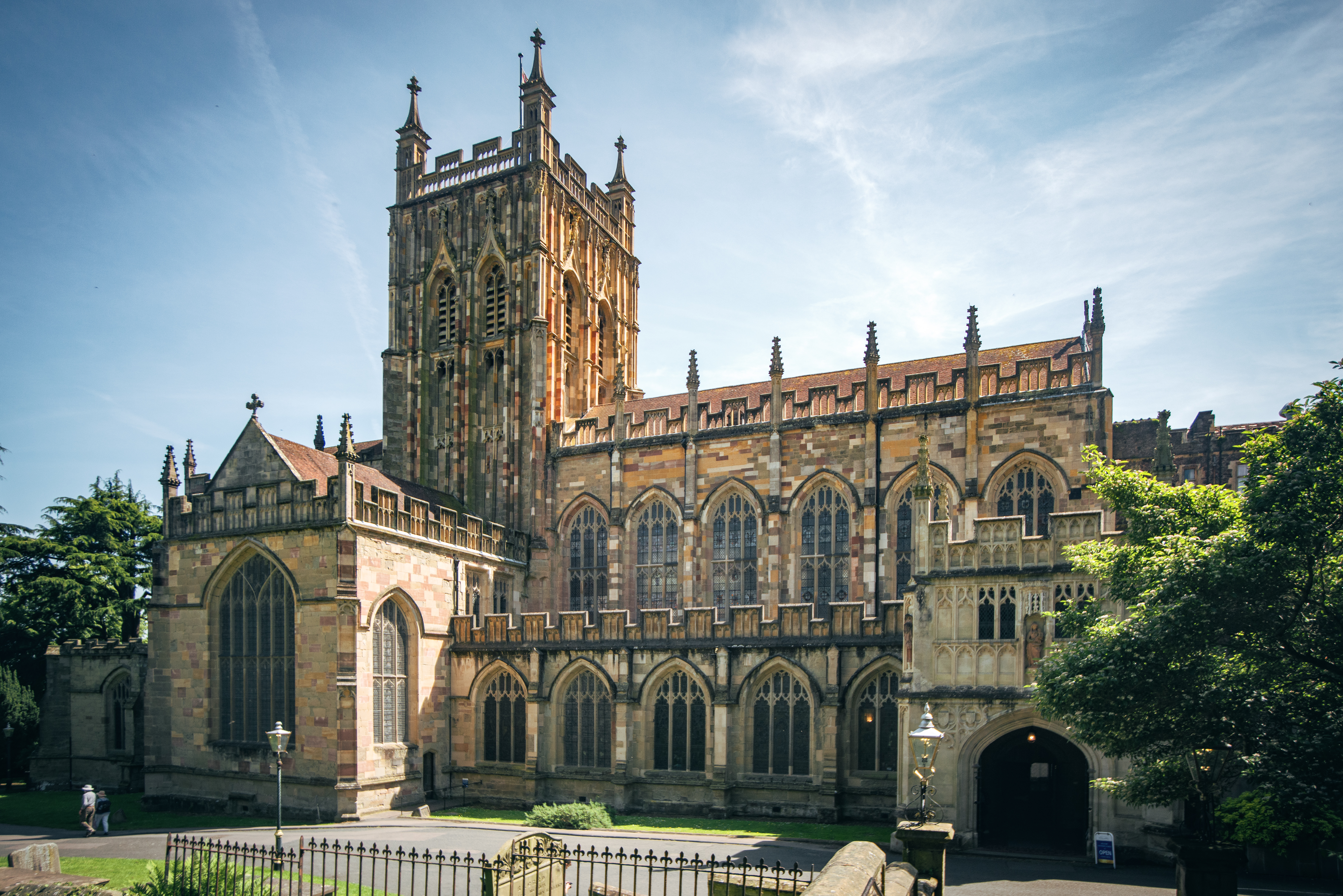
- Great Malvern Priory
- Great Malvern Priory
- 52°06′37.72″N 2°19′42.92″W
- OS grid reference: SO 77595 45851
- Location: Church Street, Malvern, Worcestershire WR14 2AY
- Country: England
- Denomination: Church of England
- Previous denomination: Roman Catholic
- Churchmanship: Open Evangelical with Choral Tradition
- Website: www.greatmalvernpriory.org.uk

History
- Status: Active
- Dedication: Saint Mary and Saint Michael

Architecture
- Heritage designation: Grade I
- Designated: 30 November 1949

Administration
- Province: Canterbury
- Diocese: Worcester
- Parish: Malvern

Clergy
- Vicar: Rev Dr Roger Latham

Great Malvern Priory in Malvern, Worcestershire, England, was a Benedictine monastery (c. 1075 – 1540) and is now an Anglican parish church. In 1949 it was designated a Grade I listed building. It is a dominant building in the Conservation area of Great Malvern town. It has the largest display of 15th-century stained glass in England, as well as carved misericords from the 15th and 16th century and the largest collection of medieval floor and wall tiles. In 1860 major restoration work was carried out by Sir George Gilbert Scott. It is also the venue for concerts and civic services.

== History ==
=== Early history ===
An ancient carved head and shoulders similar to the Lustymore Island figure on Boa Island in County Fermanagh was excavated from the grounds of the Priory. It is now housed in St Anne's Chapel. A celt, a prehistoric axe-like tool, was also excavated during the 18th Century.

An ancient carved head and shoulders was excavated from the grounds of the Priory and is now housed in St Ann's Chapel.

Little is known about Malvern over the next thousand years, until it is described as "... an hermitage, or some kind of religious house, for seculars, before the conquest, endowed by the gift of Edward the Confessor". The additions to William Dugdale's Monasticon include an extract from the Pleas taken before the King at York in 1387, stating that there was a congregation of hermits at Malvern "some time before the conquest". Several slightly different histories explain the actual founding of the religious community. Legend tells that the settlement began following the murder of St. Werstan, a monk of Deerhurst, who fled from the Danes and took refuge in the woods of Malvern where the above-mentioned hermitage had been established. St Werstan's oratory is thought to have been located on the site of St Michael's Chapel which is believed to have stood on the site of Bello Sguardo, a Victorian villa. Bello Sguardo was built on the site of Hermitage Cottage. The cottage was demolished in 1825 and ecclesiastical carvings were found within it. A Mediaeval undercroft, human bones and parts of a coffin were also uncovered. Although the legend may be monastic mythology, historians have concluded that St. Werstan was the original martyr.

=== Norman Conquest to the Dissolution ===
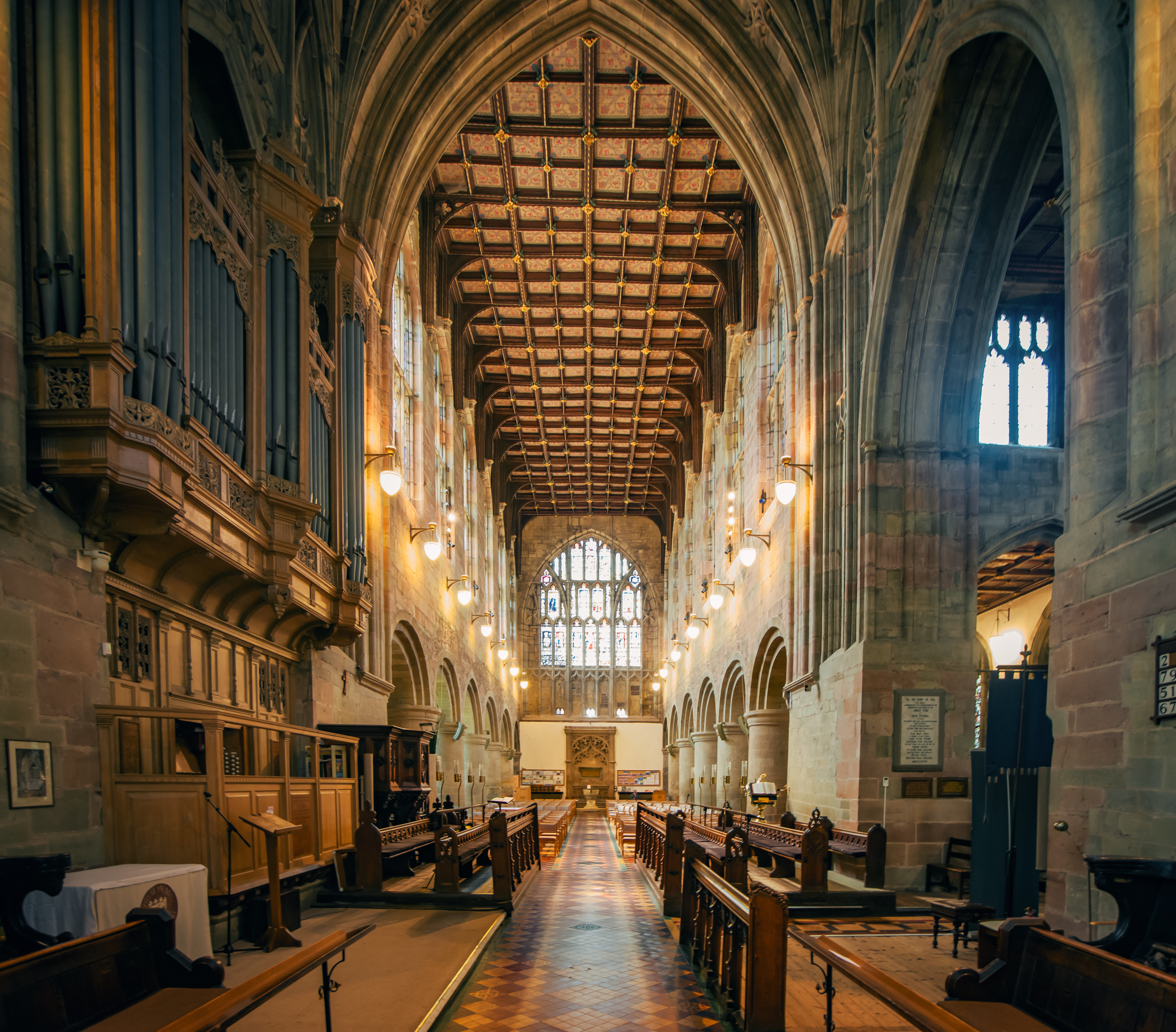
Nave of Great Malvern Priory Church. The older round columns and rounded arches date from the early period. Much of what else remains, including the upper section of the nave, dates from the expansion in the years between 1440 and 1500.

During the reign of Edward the Confessor, Saint Wulfstan, the Bishop of Worcester, encouraged a hermit named Aldwyn of Malvern to become the first Prior of Malvern Priory. The monastery was in what was then the wilderness of Malvern Chase. According to the Worcester Monastic Annals, this work began in 1085. An ancient stained glass window in the Priory church depicts the legend of St. Werstan, with details of his vision, the consecration of his chapel, Edward the Confessor granting the charter for the site, and Werstan's martyrdom.

Aldwyn was succeeded by Walcher of Malvern, an astronomer and philosopher from Lorraine in north-eastern France. Walcher's tomb lid was rescued from burial at the site of the South Transept cloister garth c. 1711. It is now housed in St Anne's chapel. The inscription on the lid reads:

Philosophus bonus dignus Astrologus lotharingus, Vir pius et humilis, Monachus prior hujus ovilis Hic jacet in cista Geometricus et Abacista, Doctor Walcherus. Flet plebs, dolet undique clerus. Huic lux prima mori Dedit Octobris seniori; Vivat ut in coelis Exoret quisque fidelis. MCXXXV.

A good philosopher, a worthy Astrologer of Lorraine, A pious and humble man, the prior monk of this fold, Here lies in a casket, a geometer skilled in the abacus, Doctor Walcher. The people weeps, the cleric grieves everywhere. To him, our elder, the first day of October brought death; That he should live in heaven may every faithful soul pray. 1135.

The priory was built for thirty monks on land belonging to Westminster Abbey. A charter from Henry I in 1128 AD refers to Great Malvern Priory as 'the Priory of St. Mary'. In 1154–1156, Westminster Abbey obtained a Papal bull from Pope Adrian IV which confirms a strong dependency of the priory of St Mary, Malvern, on the Abbey of Westminster.

An 18th-century document in the Worcester County Record Office states that in the 18th year of King William's reign (1083?), the priory was dedicated to St Mary the Virgin. Within the Victorian History of the Counties of England: A History of Worcester, edited by W. Page, there is an account of the foundation of the monastery in Bishop Guilford's Register of 1283. It describes how hermit Aldwyn petitioned Urse d'Abetot, the Earl of Gloucester, for the original site (of the Priory) in the wood, and land "as far as Baldeyate"; that he collected monks, and adopted the Rule of St. Benedict; dedicating the monastery to the Virgin Mary – but occasionally under patronage of both St. Mary & St. Michael.

On the Dissolution of the Monasteries in 1541, local people raised £20 to buy the building to replace their decaying parish church.

=== Modern renaissance ===
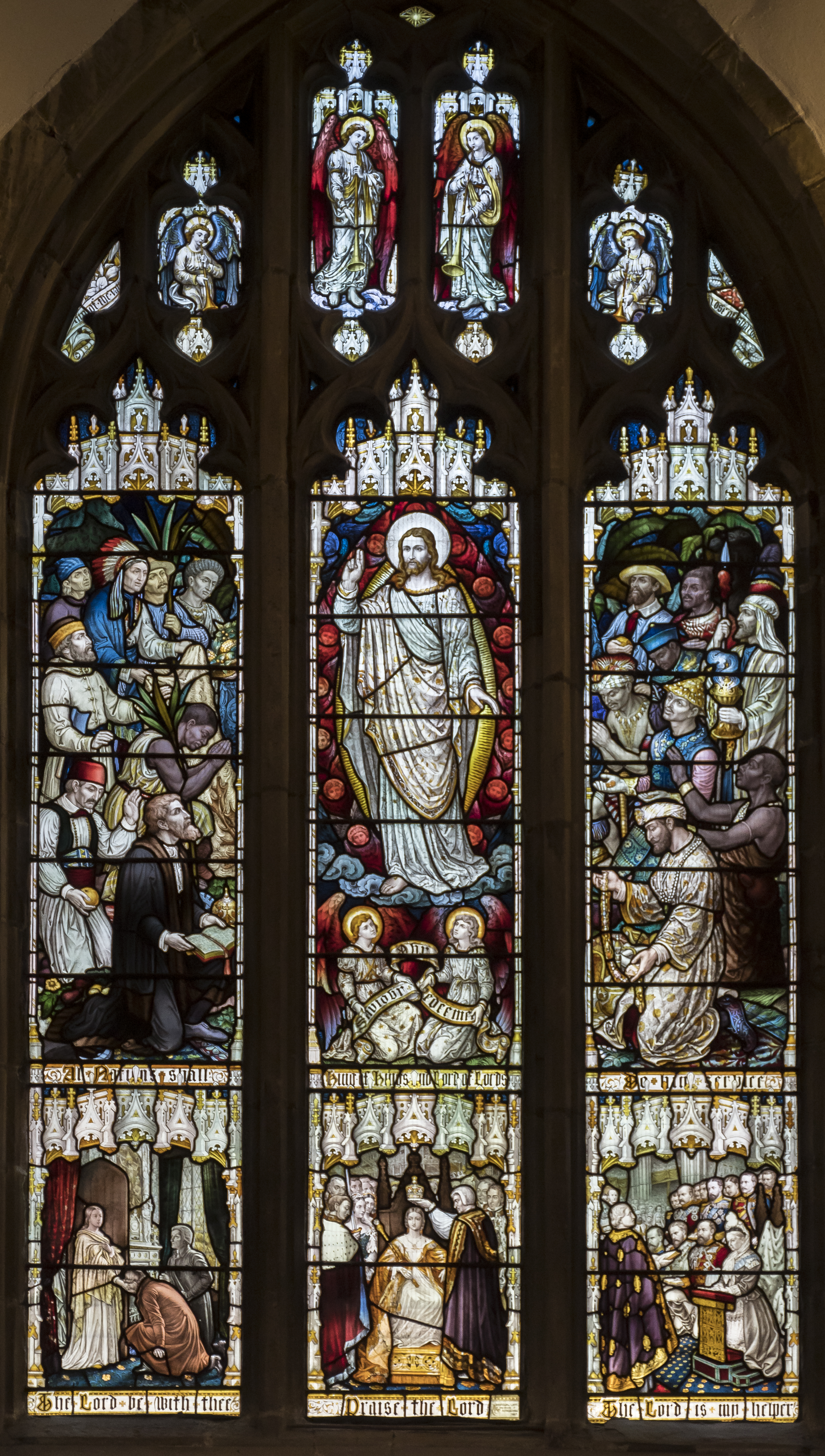
Window, commemorating Queen Victoria's Golden Jubilee, designed by Thomas Camm and made under the auspices of R. W. Winfield & Co

By 1788 the Priory had fallen into disrepair. It was partly restored in 1812 and again in 1816, 1834 and 1841. A careful restoration was carried out in 1860 under the direction of Sir George Gilbert Scott, the famous architect, who also designed the roof of the nave in imitation of the medieval original.

=== Present day ===
The church has around 314 on the parochial council electoral roll. Services are a mixture of traditional elements with some modern elements. The choir is well established. There are several active groups for children and young people. The church sponsors several "Mission Partners".

The current incumbent is The Revd Dr Roger Latham, who is the Vicar of Malvern. A past incumbent was the Christian writer Anthony C. Deane.

The building was given Grade I listed status, protecting it from unauthorised modifications or demolition.

The priory falls within the open evangelical tradition of the Church of England. However, unlike many evangelical Anglican churches that have abandoned traditional elements of Anglican worship, the church maintains a choral tradition.

== Architecture ==
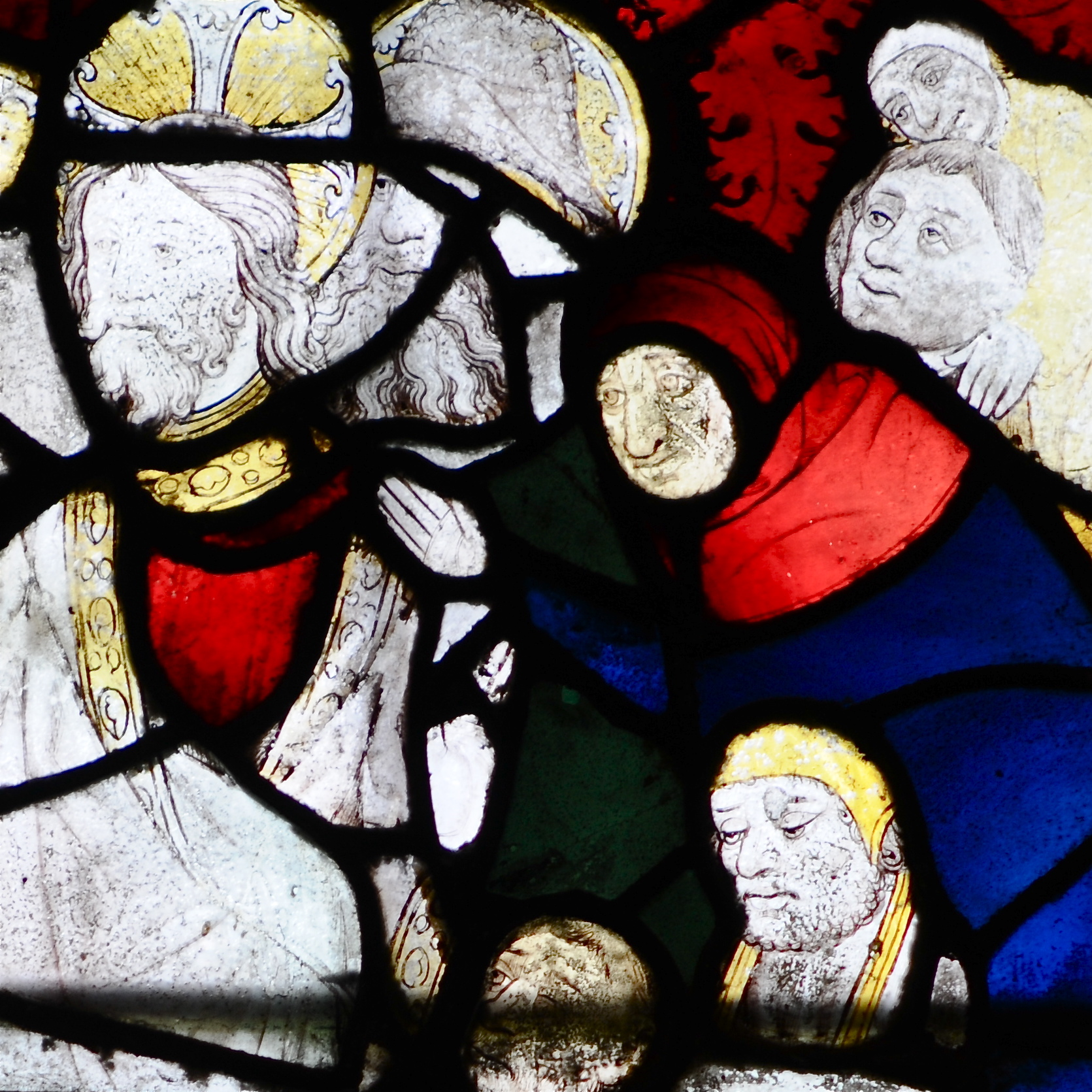
Medieval stained glass windows at Great Malvern Priory.

The present building dates from 1085, with mainly 15th-century structure, floor, and wall tiles. Extensions to the original Norman architecture church began around 1440 in the Perpendicular style and work continued until 1502. The great square central tower is very similar to that of the nearby Gloucester Cathedral; it was built by the same masons. It was redesigned in Perpendicular style by Sir Reginald Bray and has a very plain interior. The chancel is also Perpendicular in style, and contains the monument of John Knotsford (died 1589), a participant in the dissolution of the former monastic foundation. It is largely thanks to his patronage that the church, and particularly its medieval glass, survived so well.

=== Windows ===
Great Malvern Priory preserves the largest collection of English 15th-century stained glass of any English parish church. The great east window, itself the largest in any English parish church, dates from the early 15th century and has been attributed to John Thornton of Coventry. The surviving tracery depicts the Annunciation, the Apostles, saints, and symbols of the four Evangelists. The main lights originally contained scenes from the Passion of Jesus. However, many are now lost or fragmentary, replaced with glass transferred from other windows in the Priory. Best preserved is the Magnificat window in the north transept, which was donated by Henry VII in 1501 and depicts scenes from the Life of the Virgin. It was once paired with another royal donation, the great west window having been provided with glass depicting the Last Judgement that was donated by Richard III when Duke of Gloucester in the early 1480s. However this was replaced in the 19th century. There is further medieval glass preserved in St Anne’s Chapel, depicting scenes from the Old Testament.

Two late 19th century stained-glass windows commemorate Queen Victoria’s Golden Jubilee in 1887 and Diamond Jubilee in 1897. The Golden Jubilee window, in the north aisle, was designed by T. W. Camm and features a depiction of Queen Victoria with her family, including her son, the future Edward VII, and grandsons, the future George V and Kaiser Wilhelm II of Germany. The Diamond Jubilee window, at the east end of St Anne’s Chapel, was made by the studio of Charles Eamer Kempe and depicts the Crucifixion of Jesus flanked by the Virgin Mary and St Michael, the Priory’s patron saints.

Two modern stained glass windows were installed in St Giles’ Chapel in 2003 to mark the Millennium. Designed and made by the artist Thomas Denny, they draw on themes from Psalm 36.

=== Interior ===
==== Monuments ====
The monuments include a recumbent figure of a knight dating from 1200 and an alabaster altar tomb with effigies to John Knottesford (1589), his wife Jane and their daughter, Anne. Within the sacristy are several heraldic floor stones dedicated to the Lygon family. St Ann's Chapel houses the tomb lid of Walcher of Malvern, the second prior of Malvern.

==== Organ ====
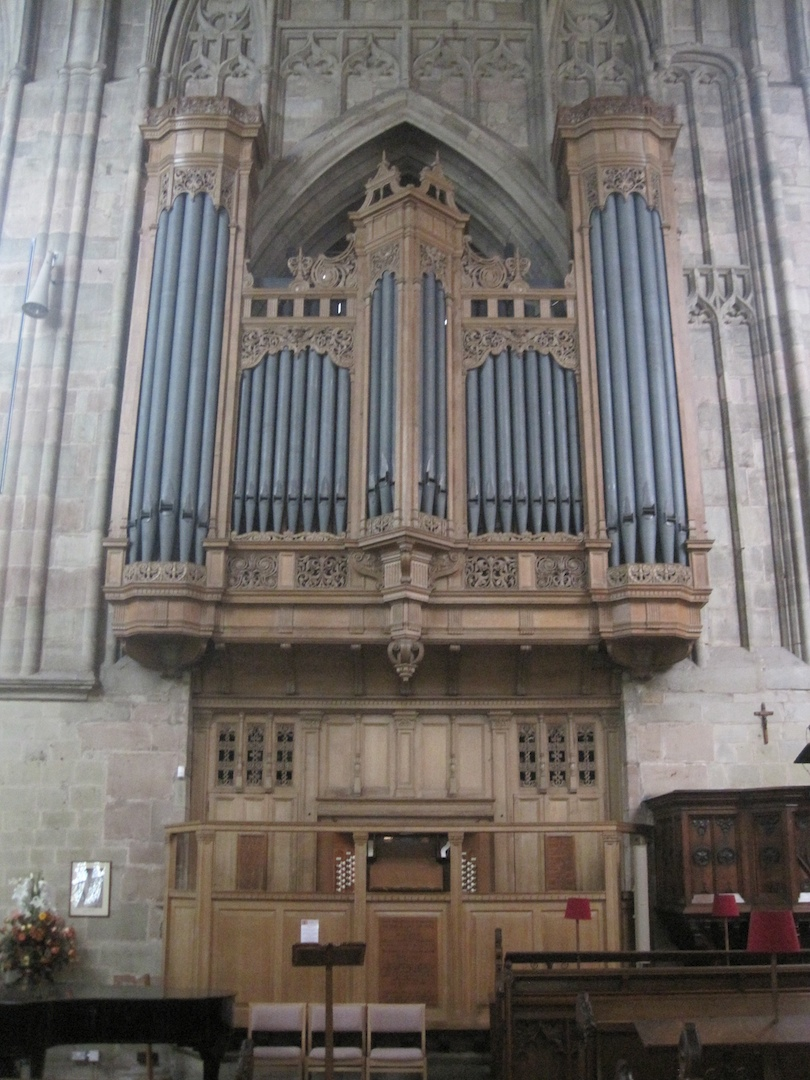
The Nicholson organ dating from 1879, restored/rebuilt 1927, 1977, 2003

The organ is by Nicholson of Malvern from 1879, but was heavily rebuilt and restored by Rushworth and Dreaper in 1927 and 1977. It was further overhauled by Nicholson in 2003 and is a Certified Historic Organ. The specification of the organ is listed at the National Pipe Organ Register.

===== Organists =====
- 1818 John Southall
- 1836 William Reeves
- 1840 Mrs William Walker
- 1843 Thomas Bissell
- 1843 George Norman
- 1847 John Roberts Boulcott (formerly assistant organist of Worcester Cathedral, later organist of Church of the Holy Trinity, Stratford-upon-Avon)
- 1847 Alfred Wheeler
- 1850 William Haynes
- 1893 Allan Pattison (formerly organist of St. Michael's College, Tenbury)
- 1895 Charles de Sousa
- 1899 Alban Claughton
- 1904 Frederick William Wadely
- 1910 Louis Hamand
- 1946 John Durham Holl
- 1973 Harold Hullah
- 1977 Richard Dacey
- 1980 Graham Davies
- 1983 Tony Hemson
- 1984 David Cooper
- 1996 Nicholas Woods
- 1999 Nigel McClintock
- 2000 Andrew Wilson
- 2006 Martyn Lane
- 2008 David Iliff
- 2012 Piers Maxim

==== Misericords ====
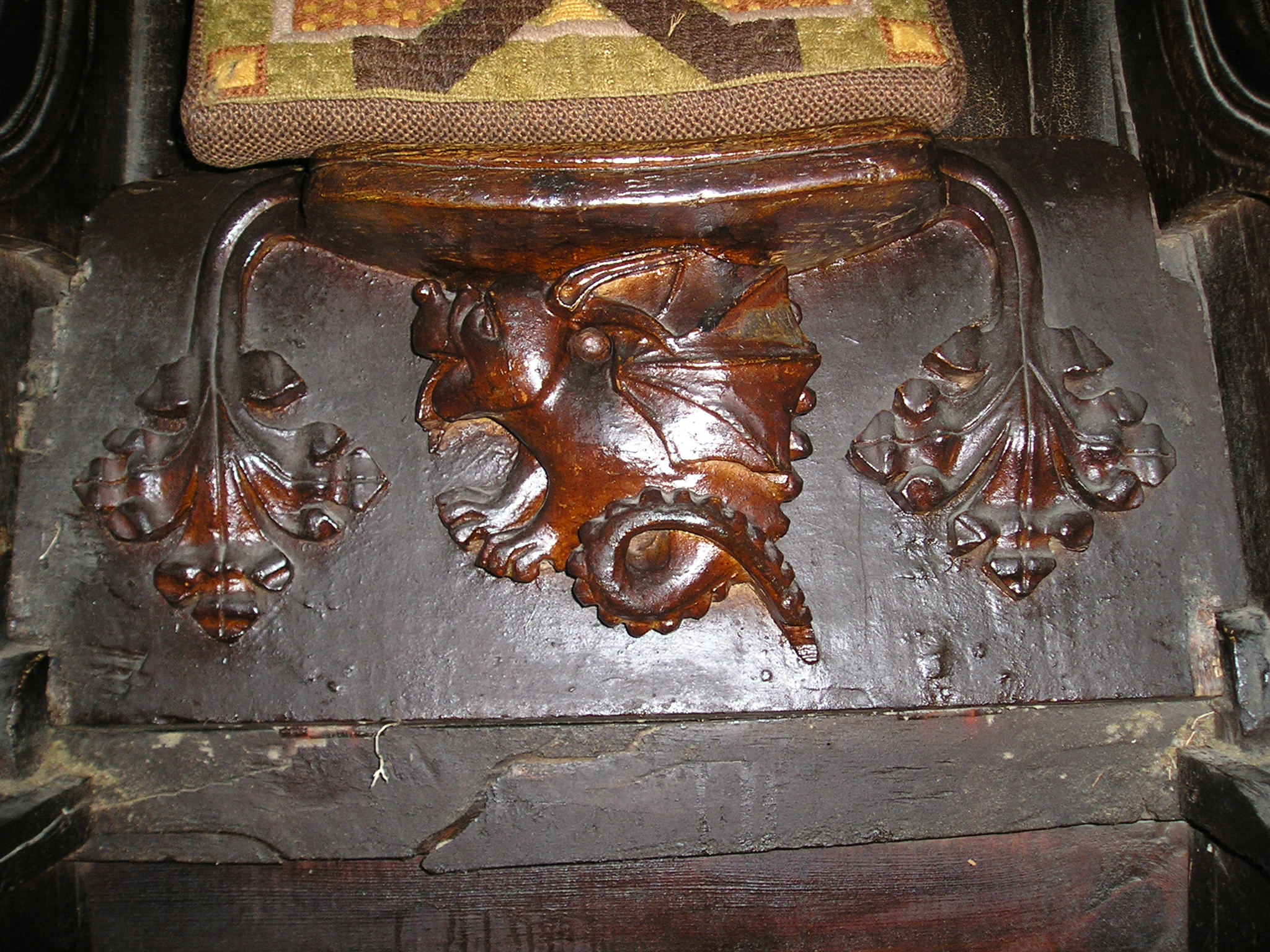
15th-century misericord depicting a Wyvern.

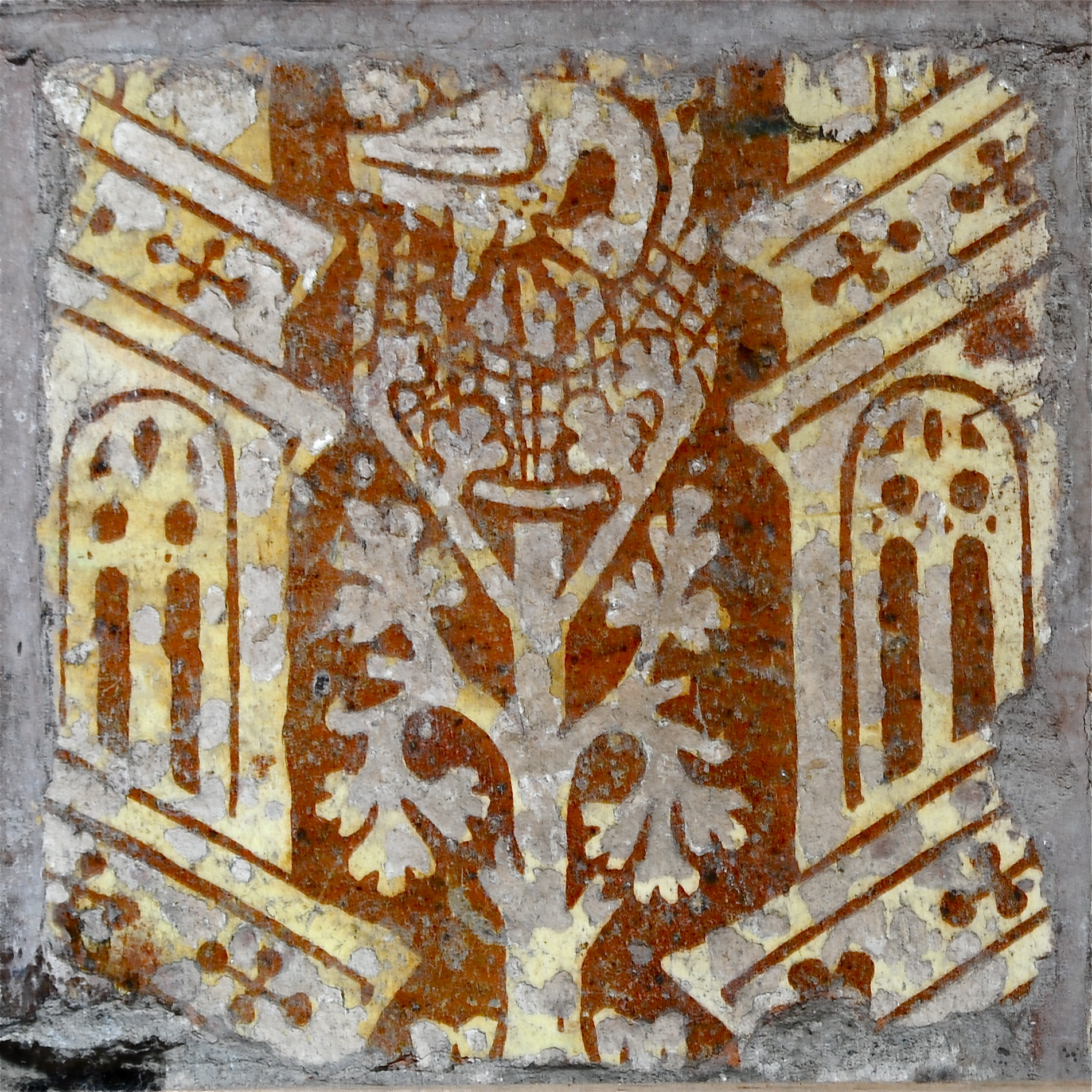
Medieval tiles at Great Malvern Priory.

The twenty-two 15th century misericords and twelve 19th-century misericords are divided into three subsets: a modern set that do not seem to follow a pattern, depictions of mythical beasts and representations of the Labours of the Months. It appears that some of the modern misericords replaced 5 of the labours, but this is still a useful record.

It is possible that the same person who carved the misericords at Worcester Cathedral and St Mary's Church in Ripple, Worcestershire was responsible for the 15th-century misericords, as they bear more than a family resemblance.

Labours of the Month

- NH-02 Swine-herd, dressed in the usual flat cap, doublet and hose, and pointed shoes, knocking down acorns. Representing October.
- NH-06 Man with bag fastened to a strap over his shoulders with a seed container on his left. He is a seed-sower and represents March.
- NB-01 Man seated at a table holding up a wine cup in each hand. Probably representing January.
- NB-02 Man reaping or weeding. In his hands he holds two implements to tend the corn. Possibly representing April, June or August.
- NB-04 Man with a scythe. Representing June.
- NB-05 Smiling man carrying a bunch of grapes in his left hand and a basket in his right. Representing September.
- SB-06 Man holding a large bunch of flowers in each hand. Representing May.

==== Medieval wall tiles ====
Great Malvern Priory has a large collection of over a thousand Medieval wall tiles. The majority were made between 1453 and 1458.

== See also ==
- List of English abbeys, priories and friaries serving as parish churches
- Places of worship in Malvern, Worcestershire

== Gallery ==
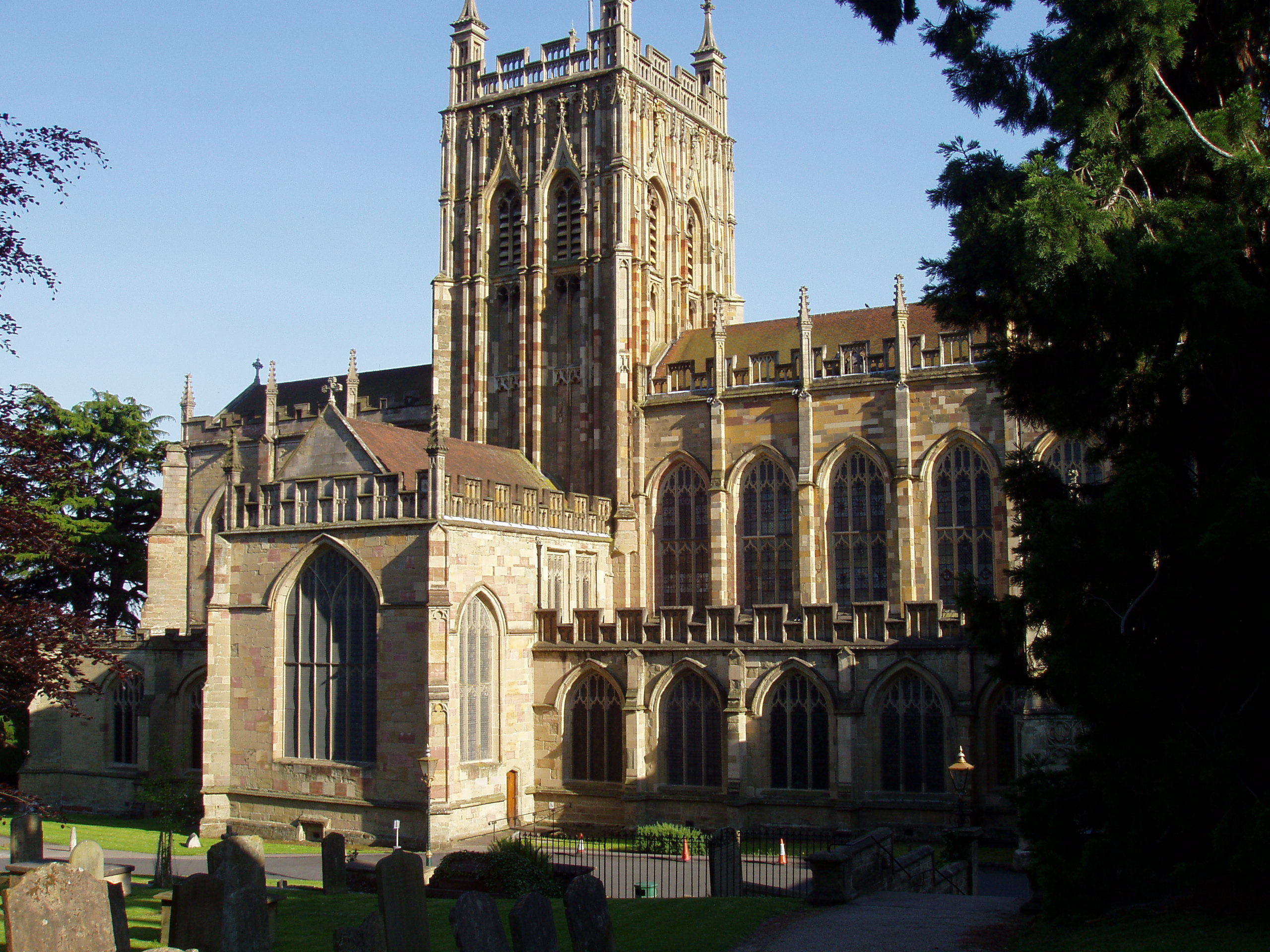
View from the priory's cemetery (north-west).

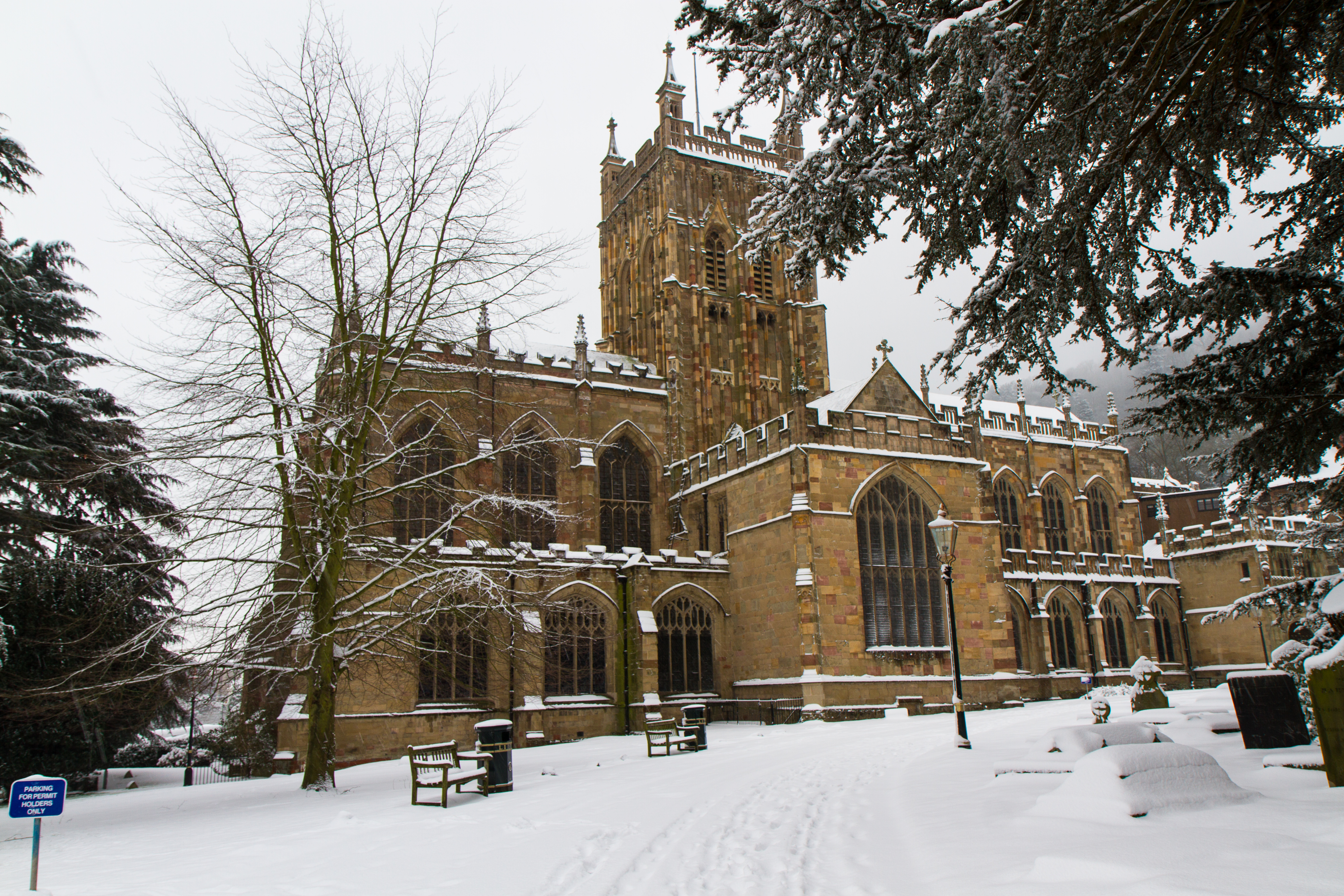
Great Malvern Priory - winter view

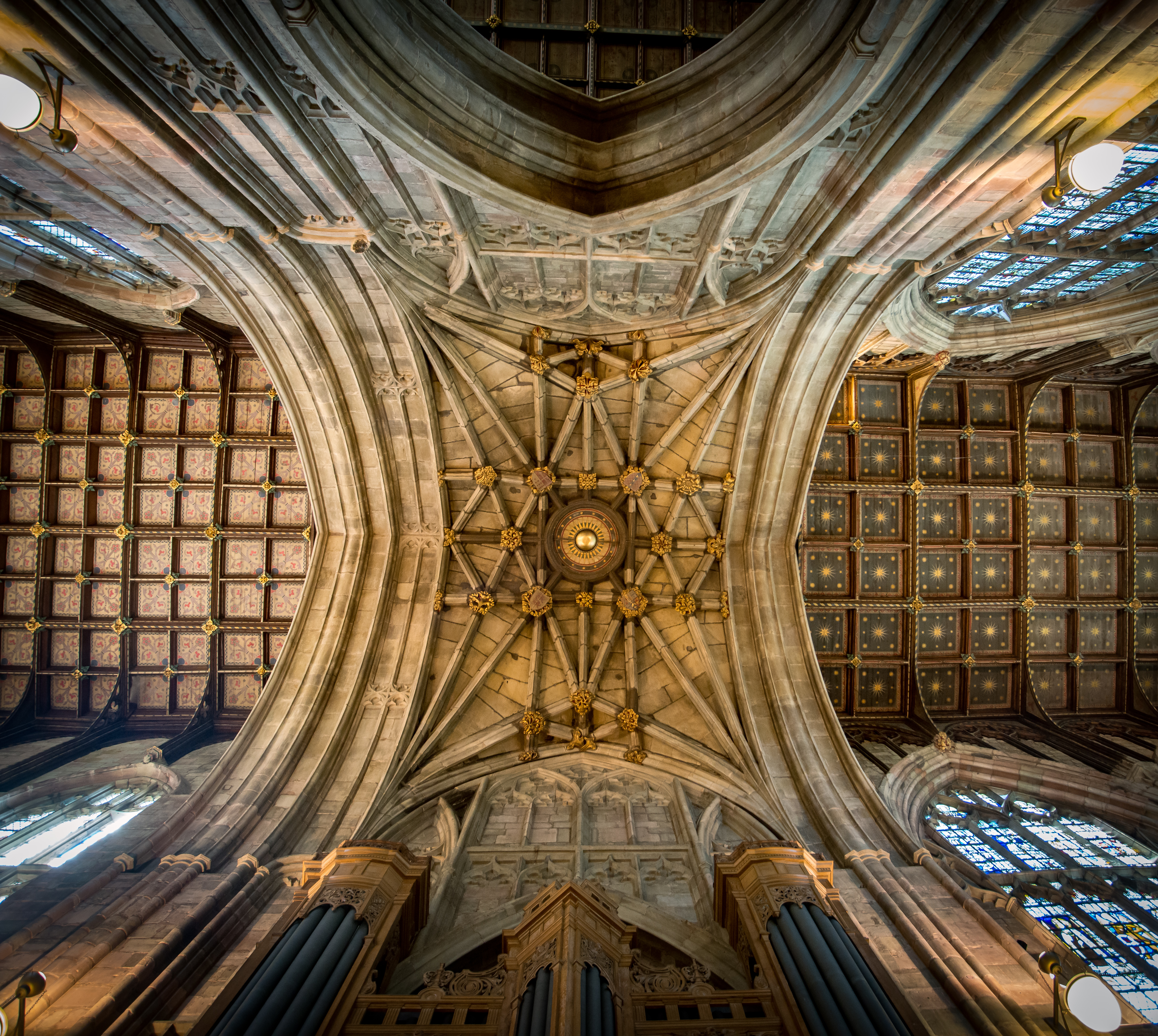
Interior view, looking upwards.

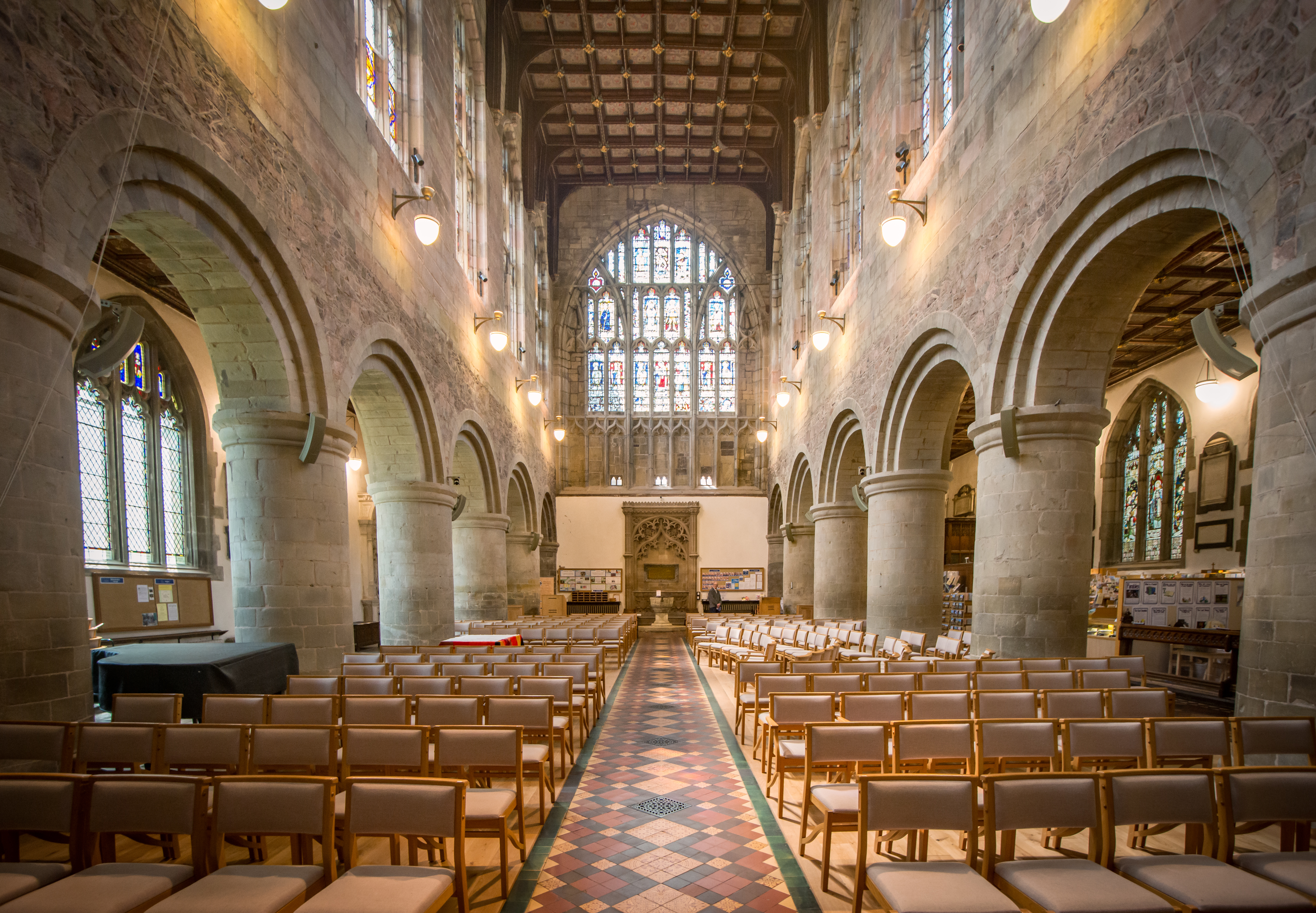
Older part of the nave

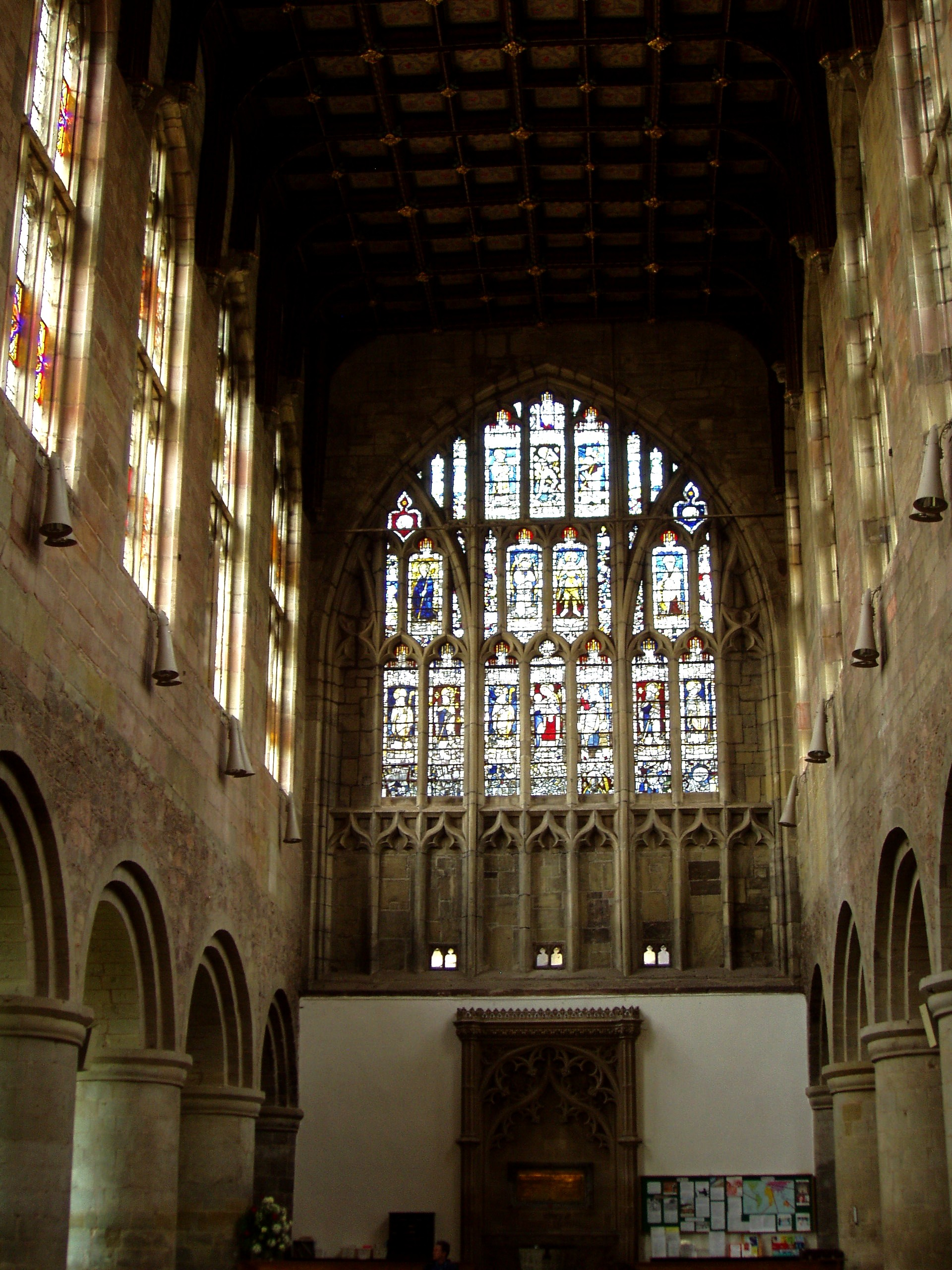
Norman columns and west window.

Great east window attributed to John Thornton

Magnificat window (1501)

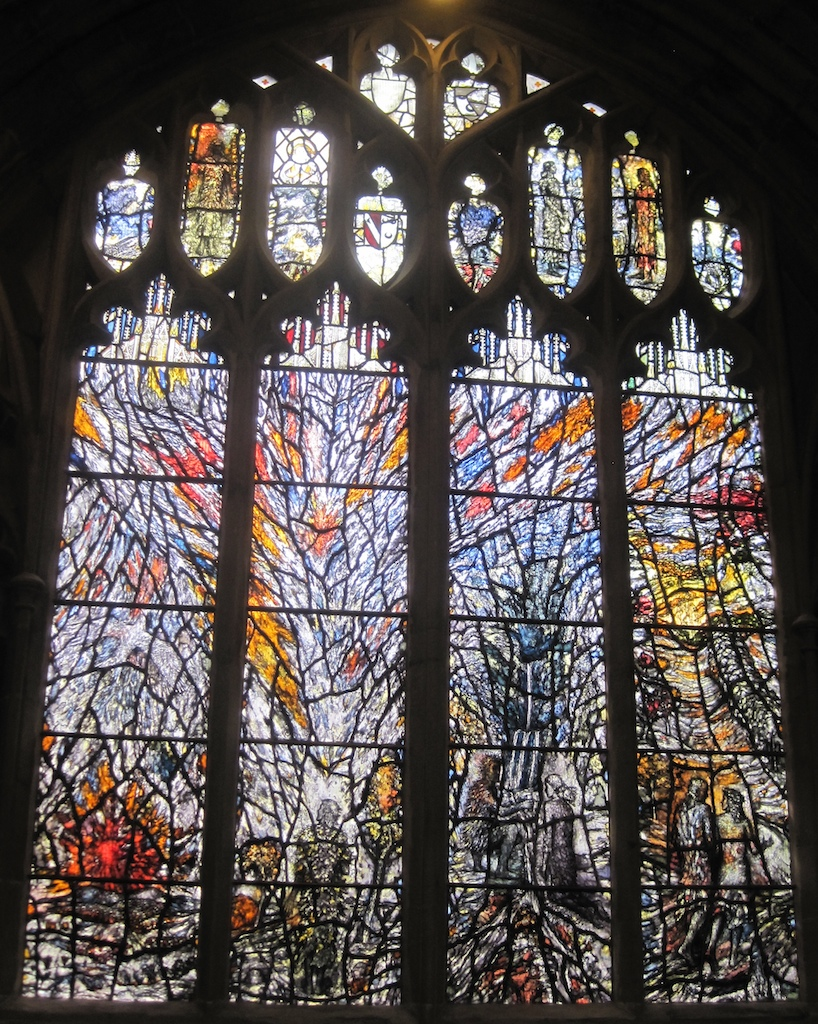
Westerly Millennium stained glass window by Thomas Denny (2003).

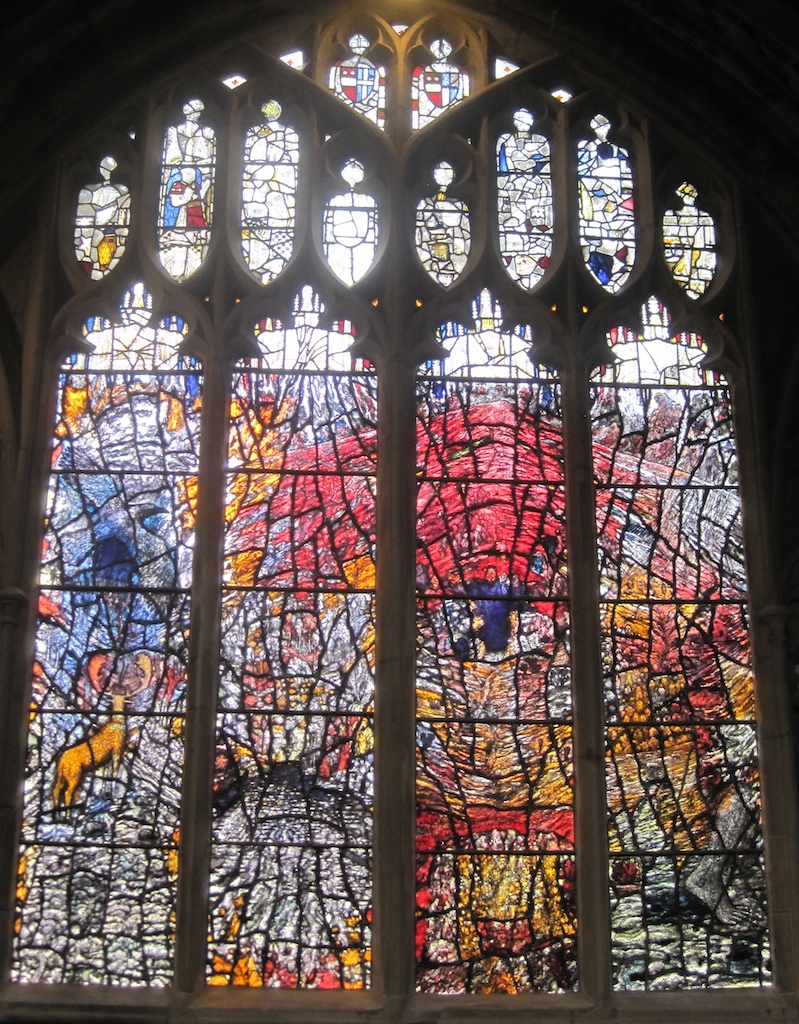
Easterly Millennium stained glass window by Thomas Denny (2003)
