= George Frost Bloomer =

George Frost Bloomer (1 April 1858 – 1938) was a composer and organist based in Stratford-upon-Avon.

== Life ==
He was the son of George Bailey Bloomer and Charlotte Frost. He achieved some notoriety in November 1895 when the organ failed, and he moved to the harmonium and sent a note to the Vicar requesting that he substitute a hymn in place of the anthem, as he was unable to play the anthem on the harmonium. The Vicar refused and insisted the anthem be proceeded with. He refused, and the Vicar took this refusal as tantamount to resignation. The Vicar then wrote him a letter of resignation which he refused to accept as it had not been signed by the Churchwarden. George prepared to leave Stratford, but through the mediation of the Church wardens, the Vicar withdrew his letter and George stayed on as organist.

== Appointments ==
- Organist at Church of the Holy Trinity, Stratford-upon-Avon

== Compositions ==
He composed many songs.
