= Sanctuary knocker =

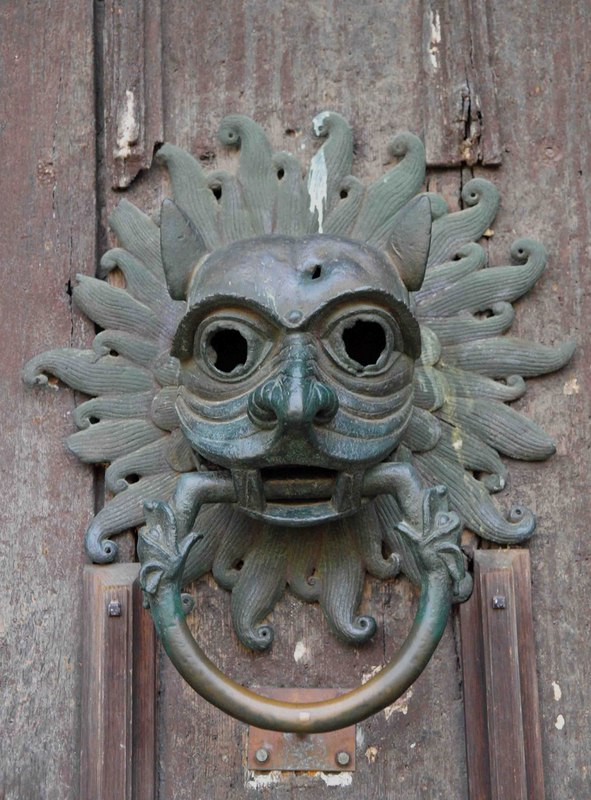
Replica of the sanctuary ring on the north door of Durham Cathedral

A sanctuary knocker, also called a sanctuary ring, is an ornamental knocker or ring on the door of a cathedral or church. Under medieval English common law, these instruments are traditionally said to have afforded the right of asylum to anybody who touched them, although the legal privilege of sanctuary attached to the church and its precinct rather than to the fitting itself. Surviving or recorded examples include those at Durham Cathedral, the Church of St John the Baptist at Adel in Leeds, St Nicholas's church in Gloucester and the Church of the Holy Trinity, Stratford-upon-Avon. By 1623, the laws permitting church sanctuary had been overturned by parliament.

== Terminology ==
The name "sanctuary knocker" is a modern convention, and the objects were not necessarily used for knocking. Durham Cathedral notes that there is no evidence that a striking plate was ever fitted to its north door, and that anyone attempting to rap the heavy ring against the boards would have injured their hands; the ring functioned instead as something to be grasped and held. Fittings of this type are described in architectural literature as closing rings or door rings, and comparable rings survive on churches with no recorded sanctuary tradition, so the sanctuary function of any individual example is often an attribution rather than a documented use.

== Surviving examples ==
Several of the best-known rings now on church doors are modern copies, the originals having been removed for conservation or lost to theft.

- Durham Cathedral. The 12th-century bronze ring was taken from the north door and is displayed in the cathedral museum; the ring now on the door is a replica installed in 1980. A cast taken from the original was also used to supply a replacement ring for Brougham Hall in Cumbria, whose own medieval iron ring was stolen.
- St John the Baptist, Adel, Leeds. The bronze ring on the south door, probably made at York around 1200, was stolen in 2002 and has been replaced by a copy.
- All Saints', Pavement, York. Carries a closely comparable ring of the same regional workshop tradition.
- St Nicholas' Church, Gloucester and Church of the Holy Trinity, Stratford-upon-Avon, both cited in early accounts of English sanctuary.

== See also ==
- Abjuration of the realm
- Cities of refuge
