= John Cook (musician) =

Anglo-American organist, composer and church musician

John Ernest Cook (11 October 1918 – 12 August 1984) was an Anglo-American organist, composer and church musician.

== Early life, education and early career ==
John Cook was born at Maldon, Essex on 11 October 1918. After leaving St. John's School, Leatherhead, he entered Christ's College, Cambridge as an organ scholar where he came under the influence of Hugh Allen and Boris Ord. A conscientious objector to the second World War, he left his Cambridge studies prematurely to drive an ambulance during the Blitz of London.

Following the War, Cook spent three years at The Old Vic Theatre in London as an assistant to Herbert Menges. He also worked as a copyist for Ralph Vaughan Williams on the score of the 1948 film Scott of the Antarctic and with Benjamin Britten on his chamber opera Albert Herring.

== Later career ==
In 1949, Cook was appointed as Organist and Choirmaster at Church of the Holy Trinity, Stratford-upon-Avon, where he served for five years before accepting a similar post at St. Paul's Cathedral in London, Ontario. During this time, he joined the teaching faculty of the University of Western Ontario, and commenced his nine-year association with the Stratford Festival as resident conductor and composer. In 1962, Cook was became Organist and Choirmaster at Church of the Advent in Boston, a Episcopal church in the Anglo-Catholic tradition. He joined the faculties of the Longy School of Music in Cambridge and the Massachusetts Institute of Technology (MIT).

== Illness and death ==
Having battled with diabetes for two decades, Cook died on 12 August 1984. A tribute concert was held at the Church of the Advent on 19 October that year and featured a chorus of his friends led by choirmaster James Busby and organists Marian Ruhl Metson and Barrie Cabena.

== Compositions ==
=== Organ ===
- Improvisation on Veni Creator Spiritus (1956)
- Invocation and Allegro Giojoso (1956)
- Paean on 'Divinum Mysterium' (1956)
- Five Studies in Form of a Sonata (1955) (dedicated to Healey Willan)
- Fanfare (1952) on YouTube
- Fantasy on A Scottish Psalm Tune, Martyrs. (1966)
- Variations on Alles ist an Gottes Segen (1967)
- Scherzo, Dance and Reflection (1965)
- Flourish and Fugue (1962)
- Mr. Purcell's Wedding March (1959) (Originally published as 'Hornpipe')
- Passacharlia (1963, 1980) (Originally published as 'Passacaglia')
- Concerto for Organ and Strings
- Chaconne in D minor (arr.) (1955)
- Chaconne from "King Arthur" (arr.) (1953)

=== Choral ===
- Magnificat & Nunc Dimittis in D Major (1963)
- Author of Light (1960)
- Te Deum Laudamus (1965)
- Missa Brevis in D (1963)
- Fear No More the Heat O' the Sun
- Christ Is Our Cornerstone
- Morning Canticles
- O God, The King of Glory: Anthem for Ascensiontide
- A Short Mass for Men's Voices (MS) (1963)
- Te Deum Laudamus and Jubilate in G Major (1952)

=== Other ===
- Three Carols for Soprano
- Toccata for Organ and Brass
- Incidental music for The Prime of Miss Jean Brodie (Broadway)
- Orchestration of The Green Table for Ballets Jooss.

== Selected recordings ==
- Organ Music of John Cook – Raven OAR-150
- Cook N' Bacon – Raven OAR-210
