= William Wells Hewitt =

English organist and composer

William Wells Hewitt ARCO (8 November 1898 – 10 October 1966) was an English organist and composer who spent much of his working life in Canada.

== Education ==
He was born on 8 November 1898 in Scarborough, Yorkshire, the son of Thomas Robert Hewitt and Mary Elizabeth Cooke.

He studied music under Dr. George Bennett at Lincoln Cathedral for 10 years, becoming his assistant organist.

He served in the Royal Air Force in the First World War.

On 11 April 1928 he married Katharine Kitty Markham in Stratford upon Avon.

He was Chairman of the Toronto Centre of the Royal Canadian College of Organists from 1940 to 1942.

== Appointments ==
- Assistant Organist of Lincoln Cathedral 1922–1926
- Organist of the Church of the Holy Trinity, Stratford-upon-Avon 1926–1933
- Organist of St. James' Cathedral, Toronto 1933–1956
- Organist of Appleby College 1940–44

== Compositions ==
He composed two hymn tunes, Stratford-upon-Avon and Nunc Dimitte.
