= Henry Bromley Derry =

Henry Bromley Derry MVO DMus FRCO FLCM (1885 – 4 April 1954) was an organist and professor of music based in England.

== Life ==
He was born in Stratford-upon-Avon, christened on 9 September 1885, the son of Henry Derry and Elizabeth Edkins. He was educated at King Edward VI School, Stratford-upon-Avon. He studied under Sir Walter Parratt, Frederick Bridge, attended the Royal College of Music from 1906 to 1910.

For about one year around 1903 he served in the Warwickshire Yeomanry.

He was awarded his FRCO in 1907 and subsequently a D.Mus.

He married Gertrude Powell on 27 April 1909. They had a daughter named Aileen Gertrude Joyce Derry on 11 May 1910.

From 1915 to 1918 he served as bandmaster in the King's Own Royal Regiment (Lancaster).

He became Chairman of the Corporation and Director of the London College of Music.

He was made a Member of the Royal Victorian Order in 1944, and changed his surname from Derry to Bromley-Derry in the same year.

== Appointments ==
- Assistant Organist of the Church of the Holy Trinity, Stratford-upon-Avon 1903 - 1908
- Organist of St. Mary's Church, Vauxhall, 1908
- Organist of All Saints' Church, Ealing 1908 - ????
- Organist of the Savoy Chapel, London 1914 - 1954
- Director of the London College of Music W1 1915
