= Church of the Holy Trinity, Stratford-upon-Avon =

Church in Warwickshire, England

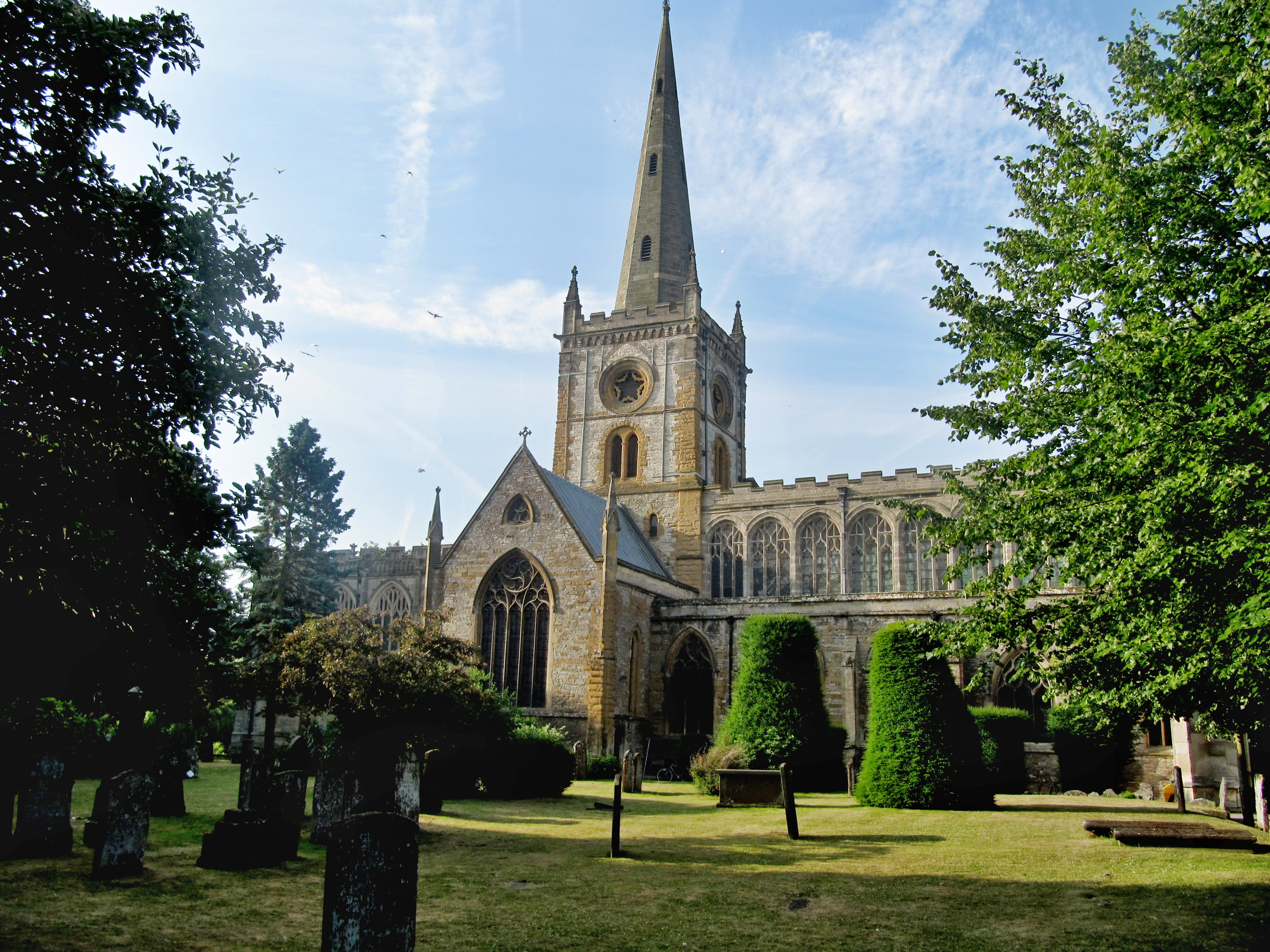
- Church of the Holy Trinity, Stratford-upon-Avon
- 52.18653°N 1.70744°W
- OS grid reference: SP 20101 54300
- Country: England
- Denomination: Church of England
- Previous denomination: Roman Catholic
- Churchmanship: Broad Church
- Website: www.stratford-upon-avon.org/

History
- Dedication: Holy Trinity

Administration
- Province: Canterbury
- Diocese: Coventry
- Parish: Stratford-upon-Avon

Clergy
- Vicar: Patrick Taylor

Listed Building – Grade I
- Official name: Church of the Holy Trinity
- Designated: 25 October 1951
- Reference no.: 1187824

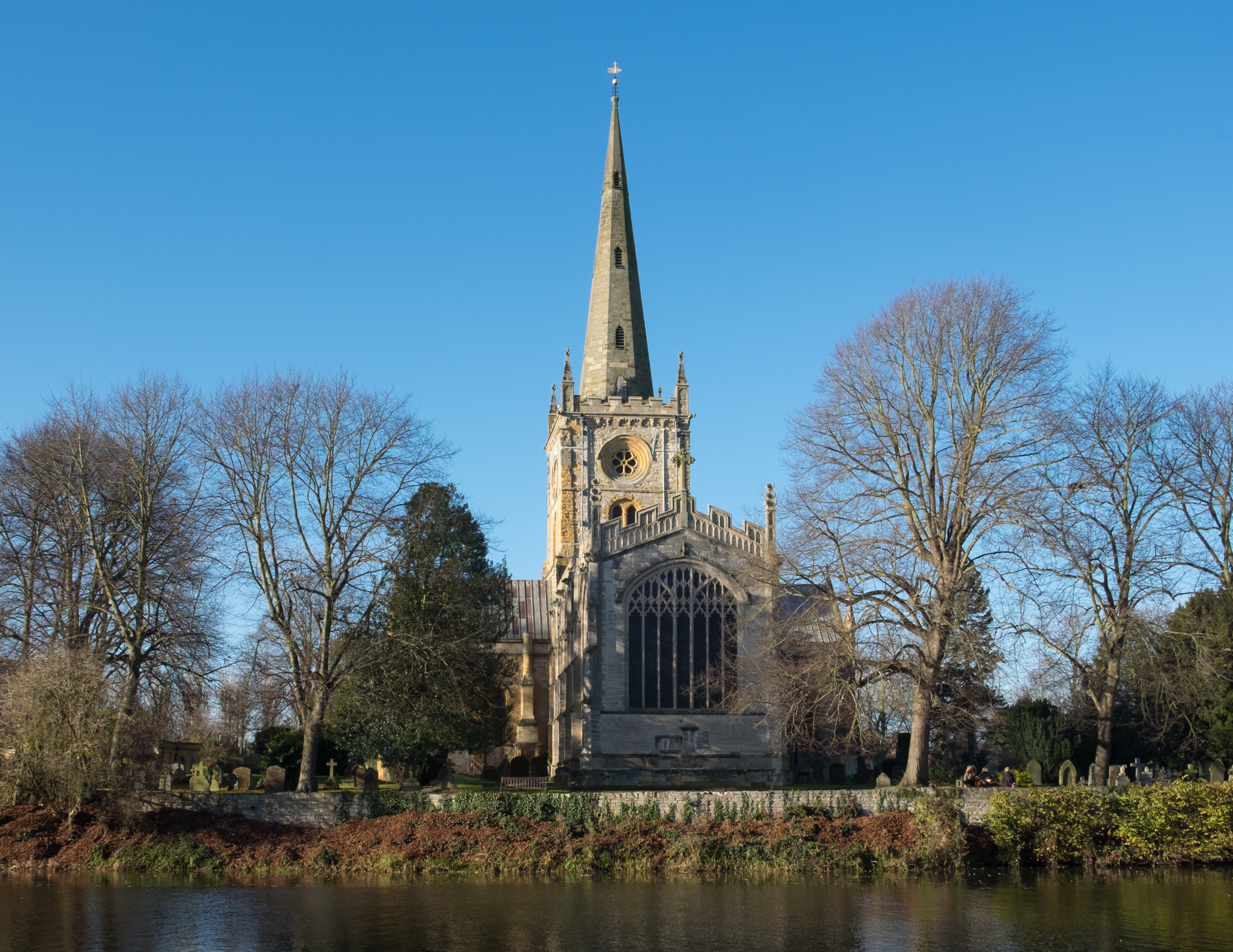
The church from the east

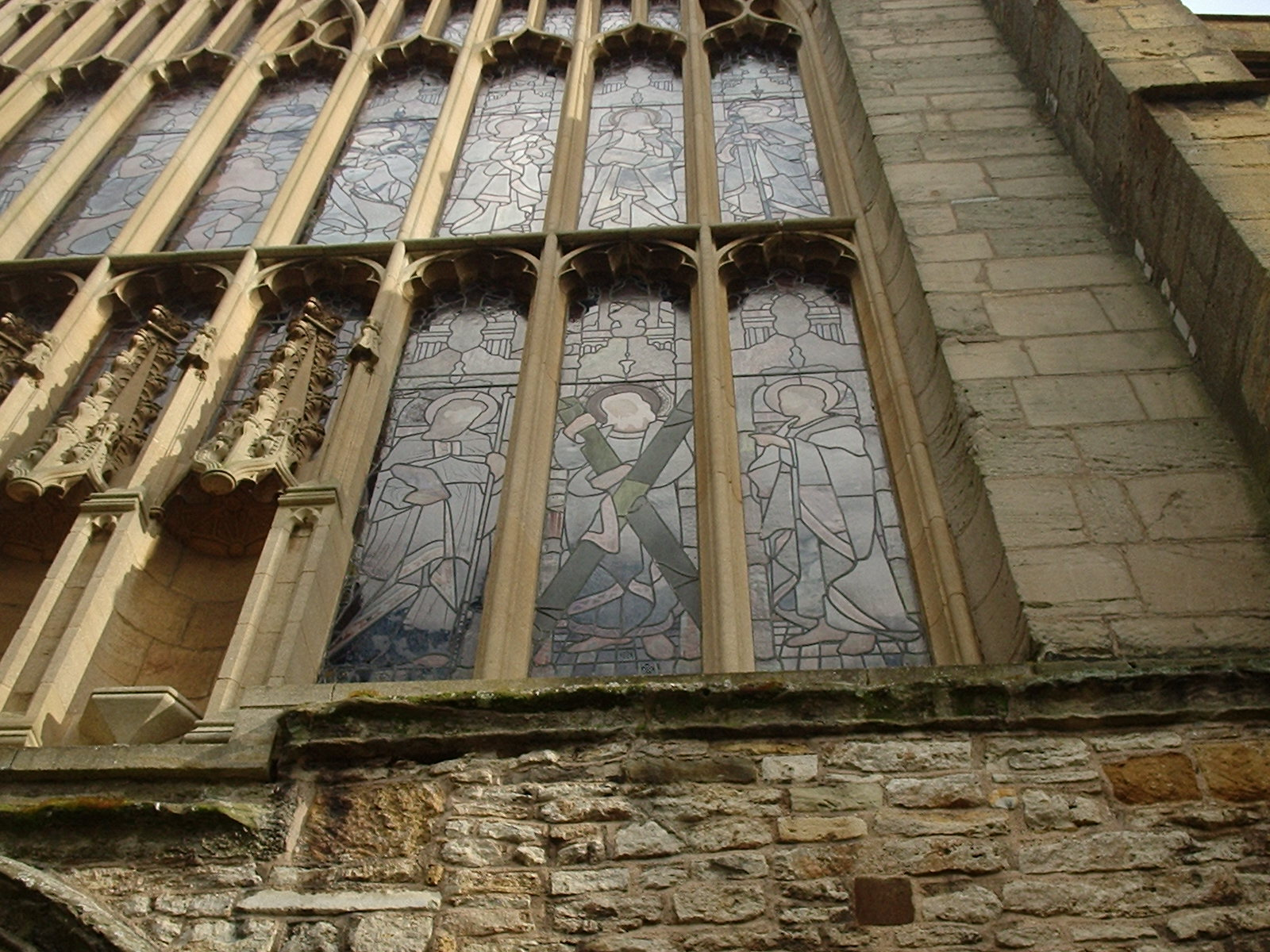
Holy Trinity's east window from the exterior, depicting St Andrew

The Collegiate Church of the Holy and Undivided Trinity is a Grade I listed parish church of the Church of England in Stratford-upon-Avon, Warwickshire, England. It is often known simply as Holy Trinity Church or as Shakespeare's Church, due to its fame as the place of baptism and burial of William Shakespeare. More than 200,000 tourists visit the church each year.

== History ==
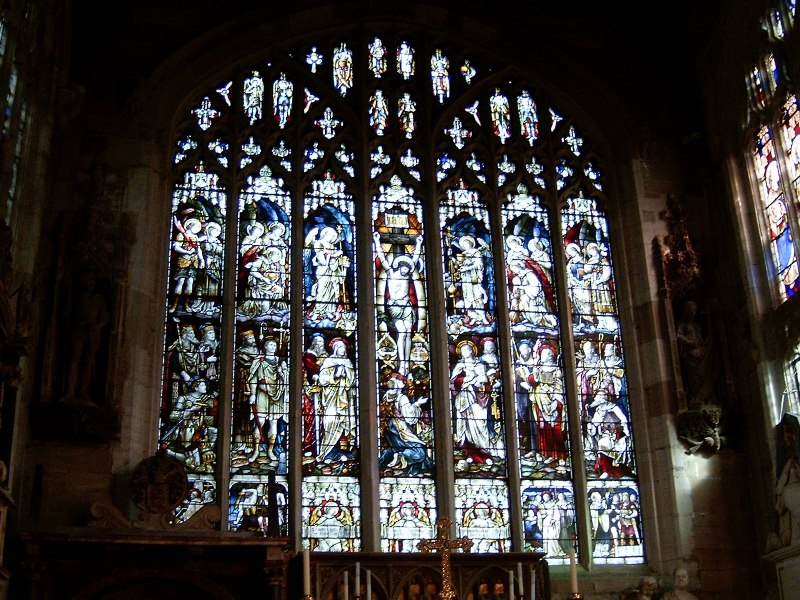
Holy Trinity's window from inside

The past building dates from 1210 and is built on the site of a Saxon monastery. It is Stratford-upon-Avon's oldest building, is situated on the banks of the River Avon, and is one of England's most visited churches. In the fourteenth century, John de Stratford founded a chantry, which was rebuilt between 1465 and 1497 by Dean Thomas Balshall, who is buried at the church. The building is believed to have originally had a wooden spire, which was replaced by William Hiorne in 1763.

Holy Trinity contains many interesting features, including:

- A 14th-century sanctuary knocker in the church's porch (built c. 1500)
- The 15th-century Clopton chantry chapel
- Twenty-six 15th-century misericord seats in the chancel, with religious, secular and mythical carvings
- Several large stained glass windows featuring major English and Biblical saints at the church's east and west ends
- The American window in St Peter's Chapel, unveiled in 1896 and inscribed "The Gift of America to Shakespeare's Church"
- Copies of the baptismal and burial records of William Shakespeare

The carved scenes of the life of Christ around Balshall's tomb were mutilated during the Reformation, as were most images of Christ. Notable "survivors" include a remarkable face of Christ or possibly God the Father within a sedilia canopy, and some beautiful medieval stained glass depicting the Resurrection and Ascension of Christ and the Day of Pentecost. The pre-Reformation stone altar slab or mensa was found hidden beneath the floor in Victorian times and has now been re-instated as the high altar.

== Organ ==
The church has a large three manual pipe organ, dating from 1841, by the organ builder William Hill. It has undergone several restorations by Hill, Norman and Beard, and by Nicholson, and now has two separate sections. The Great and Swell 1 and Pedal 1 divisions are high on the wall above the arch into the tower crossing and face west. The Choir and Swell 2 and Pedal 2 divisions are at ground level between St Peter's Chapel and the south aisle. A specification of the organ can be found on the National Pipe Organ Register. The organ case was designed by George Frederick Bodley and Thomas Garner.

=== List of organists ===
- C. J. Read, ????–1847
- John Roberts Boulcott, 1847–c. 1851–????
- Henry Mathews, c. 1858–1937
- James Henry Caseley, 1865–1888–???? (formerly assistant organist of Worcester Cathedral)
- George Frost Bloomer, ????–1895–1900–1912–????
- Dr Williamson John Reynolds, 1920–1922 (formerly organist of St Martin in the Bull Ring, Birmingham)
- William Wells Hewitt, 1926–1933 then organist of the Cathedral Church of St. James (Toronto)
- John Stuart Brough, 1933–1949
- John Cook, 1949–1954
- John Strickson, 1954–1979
- Peter Summers, 1979–2006
- Andrew Jones, 2006–2011
- Andrew Henderson, 2012–2012
- Clive Letchford, 2012–2013
- Benedict Wilson, 2013–2019
- Stephen Dodsworth, 2019–2020
- Douglas Keilitz, 2020–2024
- Oliver Edwardes, 2024-2025
- Colin Millington, 2025–present

=== List of assistant organists ===
- E. A. Sydenham, c. 1864
- Henry Bromley Derry, 1903–1908 (later organist of All Saints' Church, Ealing).
- Stephen Dodsworth, 1991–2019
- Darren Oliver, 2009–2013 (jointly with Stephen Dodsworth)

== Current status ==
The church is open to visitors for much of the year. A small contribution is requested to access the chancel and sanctuary in which William Shakespeare is buried. Holy Trinity is a member of the Greater Churches Group. The Royal Shakespeare Company performed Henry VIII in the church in 2006 as part of the Complete Works Festival. It is an active parish church serving a parish of some 17,000 people. Features of interest aside from the Shakespearean include a sandstone obelisk erected in 1858 in memory of the printer and botanist William Cheshire.

== Shakespeare ==
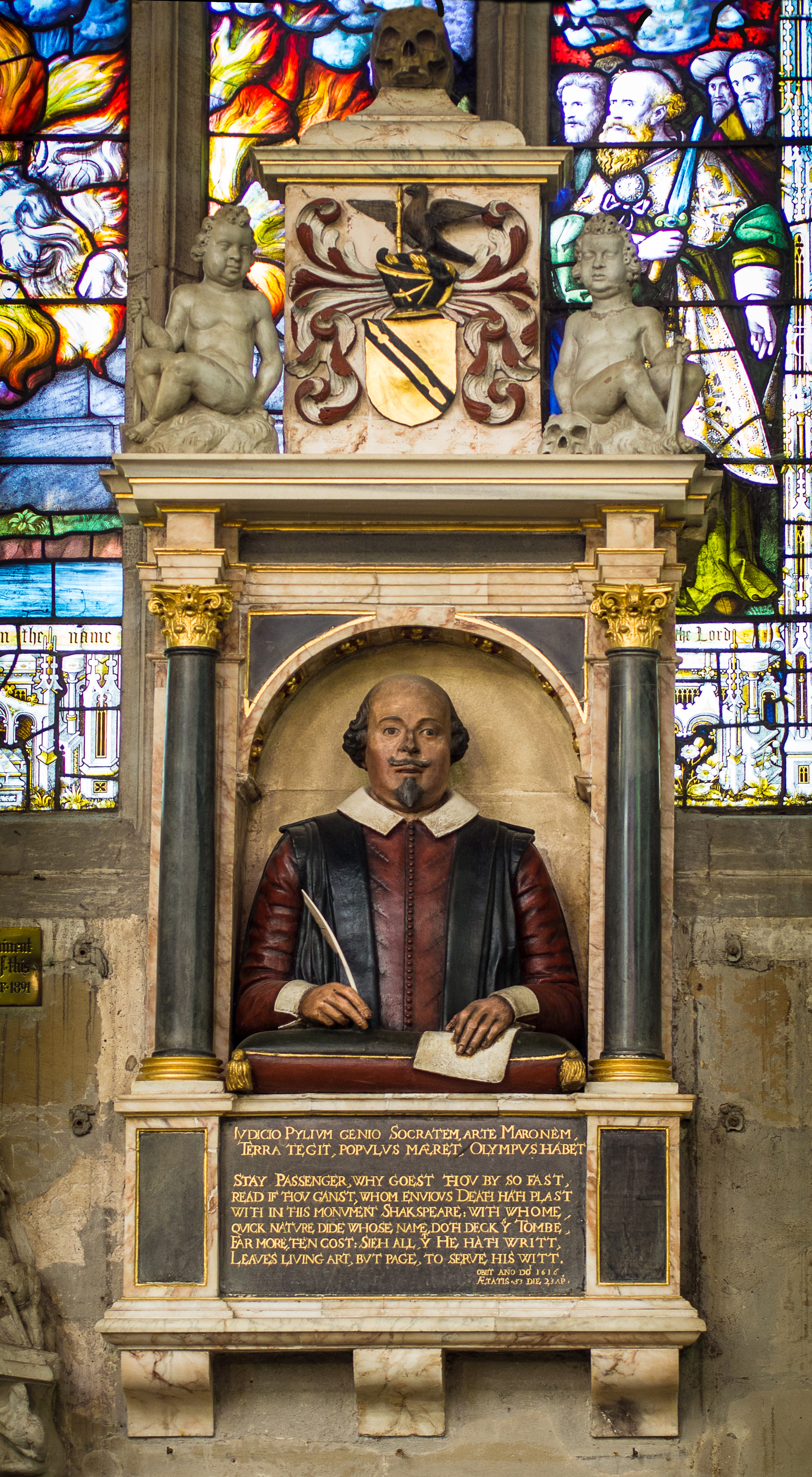
Shakespeare's funerary monument, Holy Trinity Church

William Shakespeare, poet and playwright, was baptised in Holy Trinity on 26 April 1564 and was buried there on 25 April 1616. The church still possesses the original Elizabethan register giving details of his baptism and burial, though it is kept by the Shakespeare Birthplace Trust for safekeeping. He is buried in the 15th-century chancel built by Thomas Balsall, Dean of the Collegiate Church, who was buried within it in 1491. Shakespeare was eligible to be buried in the chancel owing to his position as a "lay rector" of the church; as Peter Ackroyd explains, this was due to his leasing of tithes from the church. This entitlement was taken either at his behest or on his behalf. Shakespeare's funerary monument is fixed on a wall alongside his burial place. The funerary monument was renovated in 1746 through proceeds from a production of Othello, the first recorded performance of a Shakespeare play in Stratford-upon-Avon.

Shakespeare would have come to Holy Trinity every week when he was in town, i.e. throughout his childhood and on his return to live at New Place. His wife Anne Hathaway is buried next to him, along with his eldest daughter Susanna Shakespeare. The day after Shakespeare signed his Last Will and Testament on 25 March 1616 in a "shaky hand", William's son-in-law, Thomas Quiney was found guilty in the church court of fathering an illegitimate son, who had recently died in childbirth, by a Margaret Wheler. Quiney was ordered to do public penance within the church. Within a month Shakespeare was dead, his funeral and burial being held at Holy Trinity on 25 April 1616.

Above the grave, a badly eroded stone slab displays his epitaph:

Good frend for Iesvs sake forbeare,
to digg the dvst encloased heare.
Bleste be y^{e} man y^{t} spares thes stones,
and cvrst be he y^{t} moves my bones.

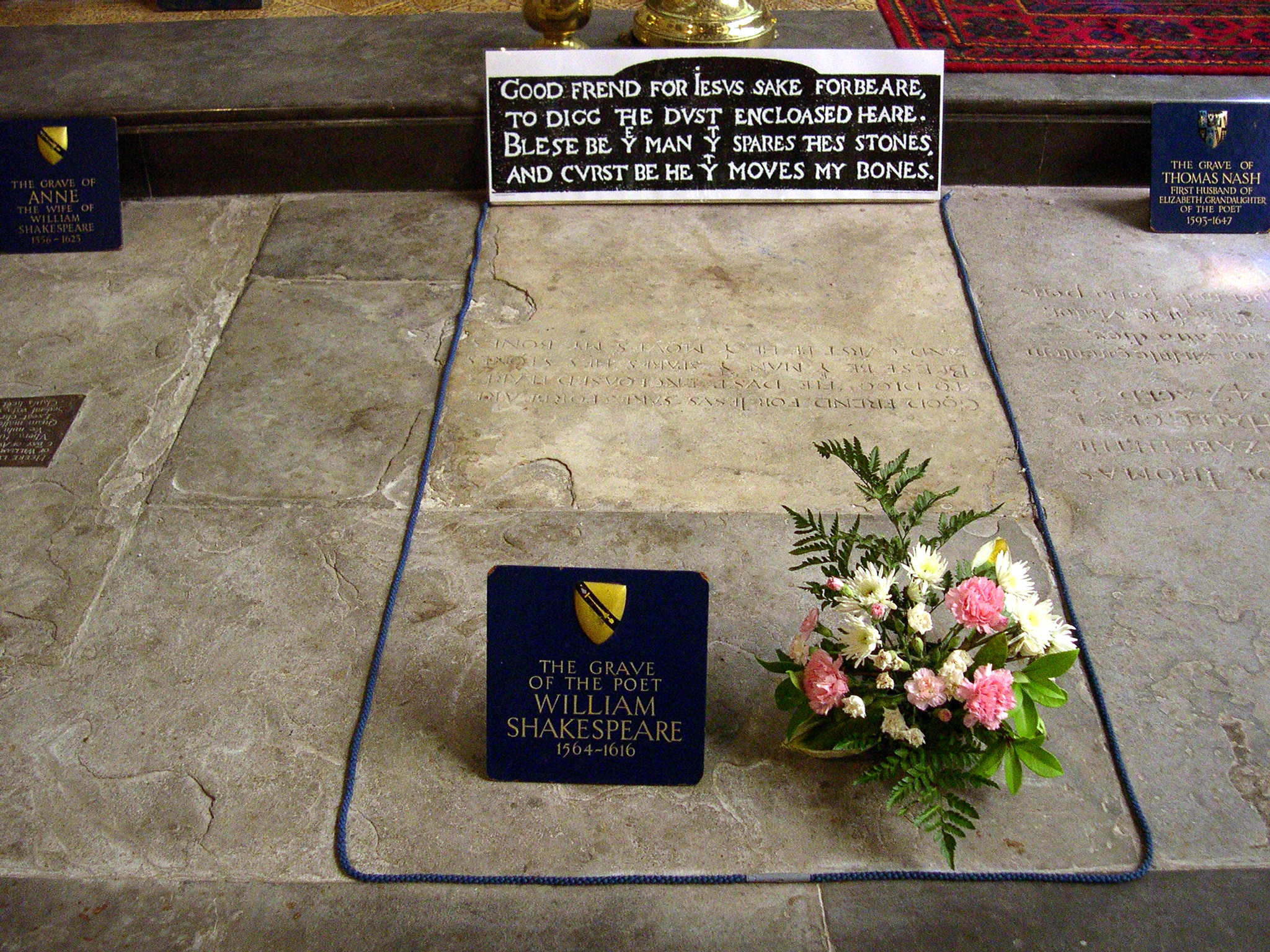
Shakespeare's grave

It has been claimed by at least one textbook author that the warning has served to prevent both the removal of Shakespeare's body to Westminster Abbey and the exhumation of his body for examination.

The grave of Shakespeare's wife Anne is next to her husband's. The inscription states, "Heere lyeth interred the body of Anne wife of William Shakespeare who dep[ar]ted this life the 6th day of Avgv[st] 1623 being of the age of 67 yeares". A Latin inscription followed which translates as "Breasts, O mother, milk and life thou didst give. Woe is me – for how great a boon shall I give stones? How much rather would I pray that the good angel should move the stone so that, like Christ's body, thine image might come forth! But my prayers are unavailing. Come quickly, Christ, that my mother, though shut within this tomb may rise again and reach the stars." The inscription may have been written by John Hall on behalf of his wife, Anne's daughter, Susanna.

== Extension ==
In January 2015, planning permission was granted for an extension next to the south aisle of the church to provide a new vestry, toilets and storage space. Construction began in 2015 and the extension was opened on 17 April 2016. Designed by the firm Stephen Oliver Architecture, it was built with local limestone. A stained-glass window which was hidden by the organ has been incorporated into the extension.
