= John Roberts Boulcott =

English organist and inventor (c.1826–1915)

John Roberts George Boulcott (c. 1826 – 12 March 1915) was an English organist and inventor.

== Education ==
He was born in 1826, the son of John Boulcott and Harriet Spencer.

He married Grace Baker Pettipher on 9 October 1849 in St. Michael's Church, Bedwardine, Worcestershire.

On 23 December 1875, he submitted an application to the Office of the Commissioners of Patents for Inventions No.4497 “for the invention of improvements in diving apparatus useful also for other purposes”.

He died on 12 March 1915 in Llanishen, Glamorganshire. His grave is in St.Isan/Llanishen Cemetery, Cardiff, Wales.

== Appointments ==
- Assistant organist at Worcester Cathedral 1846 - 1847
- Organist of Malvern Priory 1847
- Organist of Church of the Holy Trinity, Stratford-upon-Avon 1847 - ????
