= Hobby Club =

Social club in New York City

The Hobby Club was established in New York City in 1908 as an exclusive gentleman's club for people with an amateur hobby or special interest. The original number of members could not be more than 50 men. In effect, this was an opportunity to showcase their special "cabinet of curiosities" and special collections of armor, coins, precious stones and Incunable to the other members at their annual dinners.

According to its constitution, "This Club shall be called THE HOBBY CLUB. The object of the Club shall be to encourage the collection of literary, artistic and scientific works; to aid in the development of literary, artistic and scientific matters; to promote social and literary intercourse among its members, and the discussion and consideration of various literary and economic subjects."

== Dinners ==
Much of the activity of the Hobby Club was in the lavish dinners provided in the homes of the various members, who were then able to show off their hobbies and collections. The Fourth Dinner of the Hobby Club was on September 27, 1912, in the home of Theodore N. Vail who gave a presentation on "The Intercommunication of Intelligence" at his country home, Speedwell Farms, in Lyndonville, Vermont. "In the evening we had the club dinner, with Mr. Vail as speaker of the occasion. His subject, "The Intercommunication of Intelligence," enabled him to draw in a most interesting fashion upon his own reminiscences of the great work of establishing telegraphic and telephonic connection between all parts of the continent."

The Fifth Dinner was on October 31, 1912, in the home of Professor Bashford Dean and his presentation on "Ancient Armor" in Riverdale, New York. The Sixth Dinner was on December 19, 1912, was hosted by MR. John D. Crimins at the Metropolitan Club and his presentation was on "Early New York".

Through the courtesy of the [Joan of Arc] Statue Committee, the Club held a special meeting on the evening of Saturday, January 25, 1913, in the American Numismatic Society Building, to view the Joan of Arc Loan Exhibition. Dr. George F. Kunz presented to each member a special Hobby Club edition of the very artistic illustrated catalogue. The members later were entertained at the Hispano-American Museum, where their fellow member, Mr. Archer M. Huntington, acted as host and guide, showing and explaining the many rare and beautiful art and literary treasures. The Seventh Dinner was held on January 30, 1913, by Mr. Alvin W. Krech who gave a talk on "Incunabula". The Eighth Dinner was held on March 20, 1913, and hosted by Mr. George A. Plimpton who gave a talk on "Education Before Printing as Endorsed by Original Manuscripts". The Ninth Dinner was held on May l, 1913, and hosted by Dr. George F. Kunz, who gave a talk on "Precious Stones" at the Union Club. The Tenth Dinner was held on December 18, 1913, and hosted by Mr. R. T. Haines Halsey who spoke about "American Arts and Crafts of the Seventeenth and Eighteenth Centuries" at the Metropolitan Club. The Eleventh Dinner was held on February 19, 1914, and hosted by Mr. Winston H. Hagen who spoke about 'By-ways of Book Collecting'. The address was delivered by Mr. Halsey at his residence, No. 64 West 55th Street.

The Twelfth Dinner was held on March 26, 1914, and hosted by MR. David Wagstaff who spoke on "Books on Angling" at his home on No. 26 West 52nd Street. The Thirteenth Dinner was held on April 23, 1914, and hosted by MR. Percy R Pyne who spoke on 'Old Prints of New York". The Fourteenth Dinner was held on November 20, 1914, and hosted by PROF. Edwin R. A. Seligman who spoke about "Curiosities of Economic Literature" at his home at No. 324 West 86th Street. The Fifteenth Dinner was held on January 12, 1915, at the Metropolitan Club and hosted by MR. Rowland G. Hazard, who spoke on "Prehistoric Implements". The Sixteenth Dinner was held on February 12, 1915, and hosted by MR. Phoenix Ingraham who spoke on "Thackeray and Stevenson" at his home at No. 80 Irving Place. The Seventeenth Dinner was held on April 23, 1915, and hosted by MR. Edward T. Newell, who spoke on "Ancient Greek and Roman Coins' at the Metropolitan Club. The Eighteenth Dinner was held on December 16, 1915 and hosted by MR. Henry E. Huntington who spoke on "Books and Manuscripts of My Library" from his home at No. 2 East 57th Street. The Nineteenth Dinner was held on January 18, 1916, and hosted by MR. Henry S. Van Duzer who spoke on "Thackerayana" from his home at No. 30 East 55th Street. The Twentieth Dinner was held on February 17, 1916, and hosted by MR. William B. Osgood Field who spoke on "Some Illustrators of the Nineteenth Century" from his home at No. 645 Fifth Avenue. The Twenty-first Dinner was held on March 30, 1916, and hosted by MR. Albert Gallatin who spoke on "Original Drawings" from his home on No. 7 East 67th Street. The Twenty-second Dinner was held on November 9, 1916, and hosted by DR. Charles William Wallace who spoke on "Shakespeariana" at the Metropolitan Club. The Twenty-third Dinner was held on January 25, 1917, and hosted by PROF. David Eugene Smith who spoke on "MlRABILIA MATHEMATICA" at the Union Club. The Twenty-fourth Dinner was held on February 22, 1917, and hosted by MR. Charles A. Munn who spoke on his collection of "Washington Portraits and Distinguished Americans of the Eighteenth Century" at his home at No. 62 East 55th Street. The Twenty-fifth Dinner was held on December 6, 1917, and hosted by MR. William K. Bixby who showed his collection of "Unpublished Autograph Letters and Manuscripts" in his home at No. 2 East 57th Street.

=== Table ===
The Dinners of the Hobby Club
#	Date	Host	Subject	Location
1	December 28, 1908	(Unknown)	(Unknown)	Metropolitan Club
2	(Unknown)	(Unknown)	(Unknown)	(Unknown)
3	(Unknown)	(Unknown)	(Unknown)	(Unknown)
4	September 27, 1912	Theodore N. Vail	"The Intercommunication of Intelligence"	Speedwell Farms, Lyndonville, Vermont
5	October 31, 1912	Professor Bashford Dean	"Ancient Armor"	Riverdale, New York
6	December 19, 1912	Mr. John D. Crimins	"Early New York"	Metropolitan Club
7	January 25, 1913	Joan of Arc Statue Committee	Joan of Arc Loan Exhibition	American Numismatic Society Building
8	January 30, 1913	Mr. Alvin W. Krech	"Incunabula"	(Location not specified)
9	March 20, 1913	Mr. George A. Plimpton	"Education Before Printing as Endorsed by Original Manuscripts"	(Location not specified)
10	May 1, 1913	Dr. George F. Kunz	"Precious Stones"	Union Club
11	December 18, 1913	Mr. R. T. Haines Halsey	"American Arts and Crafts of the Seventeenth and Eighteenth Centuries"	Metropolitan Club
12	February 19, 1914	Mr. Winston H. Hagen	"By-ways of Book Collecting"	Mr. Halsey's residence, No. 64 West 55th Street
13	March 26, 1914	Mr. David Wagstaff	"Books on Angling"	No. 26 West 52nd Street
14	April 23, 1914	Mr. Percy R. Pyne	"Old Prints of New York"	(Location not specified)
15	November 20, 1914	Prof. Edwin R. A. Seligman	"Curiosities of Economic Literature"	No. 324 West 86th Street
16	January 12, 1915	Mr. Rowland G. Hazard	"Prehistoric Implements"	Metropolitan Club
17	February 12, 1915	Mr. Phoenix Ingraham	"Thackeray and Stevenson"	No. 80 Irving Place
18	April 23, 1915	Mr. Edward T. Newell	"Ancient Greek and Roman Coins"	Metropolitan Club
19	December 16, 1915	Mr. Henry E. Huntington	"Books and Manuscripts of My Library"	No. 2 East 57th Street
20	January 18, 1916	Mr. Henry S. Van Duzer	"Thackerayana"	No. 30 East 55th Street
21	February 17, 1916	Mr. William B. Osgood Field	"Some Illustrators of the Nineteenth Century"	No. 645 Fifth Avenue
22	March 30, 1916	Mr. Albert Gallatin	"Original Drawings"	No. 7 East 67th Street
23	November 9, 1916	Dr. Charles William Wallace	"Shakespeariana"	Metropolitan Club
24	January 25, 1917	Prof. David Eugene Smith	"MIRABILIA MATHEMATICA"	Union Club
25	February 22, 1917	Mr. Charles A. Munn	"Washington Portraits and Distinguished Americans of the Eighteenth Century"	No. 62 East 55th Street
26	December 6, 1917	Mr. William K. Bixby	"Unpublished Autograph Letters and Manuscripts"	No. 2 East 57th Street

== Club Publications by members ==
At the meetings, privately published books were given to the other members as a souvenir by the speakers. These items were published in severely limited editions. A list is given on pages 37–38 of the Annals of the Hobby Club. They include:

- Darwin Pearl Kingsley. "Let Us Have Peace". A volume of addresses by Mr. Kingsley. OCLC: 81092807 and 5191677. The address was also reprinted as "Let us have peace and other addresses." New York, New York Life Insurance Company, 1919.
- Dr. George F. Kunz. "Shakespeare and Precious Stones" and "Ivory and the Elephant". These were special Hobby Club editions limited to the membership of the club and each copy bearing the printed name of the member for whom it was intended. Dr. Kunz' personal copy is held in the United States Geological Survey Library.
- Prof. Edwin R. A. Seligman. "Curiosities of Early Economic Literature. An address to his fellow members of The Hobby Club." OCLC: 10565300. Notes: Title page printed in red, blue and black; title printed in red as shoulder notes; page numbers and initials printed in blue. Pages [1]-[8], first sequence, and [2]-[12], third sequence, are blank. One hundred numbered copies printed. Description: [10], xxvi, [12] p., [1] leaf of plate: col. ill.; 40 cm.
- Theodore N. Vail. "John Eliot and the Indians, 1652-1657." Being letters addressed to Reverend Jonathan Hammer of Barnstaple, England. Reproduced from original manuscripts in the possession of Mr. Vail. OCLC: 492236. Notes: Includes facsimiles of title-pages of fourteen of Eliot's printed works. Plate and facsimiles have guard sheets with descriptive letterpress. "One hundred and fifty copies printed."
- William Keeney Bixby. "Poems and Letters in the Handwriting of Robert Burns" Reproduced in facsimile from manuscripts owned by Mr. Bixby and by Mr. Frederick W. Lehmann. Mr. Bixby also presented numerous other reproductions of items in his collection. Reprinted for the Burns Club of St Louis. OCLC: 751773176.
- William B. Osgood Field. "Napoleon" An Essay by William M. Thackeray, together with reproductions of five of his original sketches. OCLC: 26704490. Notes: "Privately printed." "Seventy-five copies of this book were printed by ... the Merrymount Press ... in the month of March, 1915"—Colophon. Foreword signed: W.B.O.F. [i.e. William B. Osgood Field]. Description: 23 p., [5] leaves of plates: facsims.; 23 cm. Responsibility: by William Makepeace Thackeray, together with reproductions of five original sketches by the author.
- Rowland G. Hazard. A Record of the Ceremony and Oration on the Occasion of the Dedication of the Monument Commemorating the Great Swamp Fight, December 19, 1675, in the Narragansett Country, Rhode Island. OCLC: 478609. Notes: Compiled by Rowland Gibson Hazard. Includes maps of Great Swamp country in South Kingstown, Rhode Island. Description: 68 p., [3] p. of plates : ill., folded maps; 24 cm. Contents: The ceremony at the monument—The oration—Inscription—Partial list of references—A list of contributors to the memorial.
- John Quinn (collector). "Ezra Pound, His Metric and Poetry". OCLC: 144652299. Description: Originals: 46 linear feet (72 boxes, 41 letterbooks, 3 v.). General correspondence: 50 microfilm reels. Other Titles: John Quinn Memorial Collection. The collection consists mainly of correspondence, with writings, printed matter and photographs that document Quinn's artistic and political interests.

== Publications ==
- Annals of the Hobby Club of New York City, 1912-1920. Hobby Club, New York. [New York] Priv. print. [The De Vinne press] 1920. Note: "One hundred copies printed for members of the Hobby club." Preceded by Papers of the Hobby Club, 1911–1912.
- Hobby club, New York, William Peterfield Trent, John Canfield Tomlinson, Darwin P. Kingsley, and Bruce Rogers. 1912. Papers of the Hobby Club, 1911–1912. [Cambridge, Mass.]: Priv. Print. [The Riverside Press]. Half-title: First year book of the Hobby Club of New York City. "One hundred copies printed for members of the Hobby Club." Continued as Annals of the Hobby Club of New York City, 1912–1920. Officers.--Committees.--Charter members.--Constitution and by-laws.--The first year of the Hobby Club.--A talk about Defoe [by W.P. Trent]--The sun-dial [by J.C. Tomlinson]--Shakespeariana [by D.P. Kingsley]--Members.--Necrology.
- Hobby Club of New York, Sulgrave Institution, and Vechten Waring Co. 1920. Exhibition of bookes &c. by and aboute the establishers of Plimoth Plantation and of the Virginia Companie: who set up the first representative assembly of free men: 1620 1920. [New York, N.Y.]: Imprinted at New York by Vechten VVaring Companie. Another issue of this broadside has at foot: Printed for the meeting of the Hobby Club held at the residence of Henry Edwards Huntington, LL.D., Fifth Avenue at Fifty-Seventh Street, New York City, on the evening of Forefather's Day, Tuesday, the twenty-first of December, 1920, in commemoration of the tercentenary of the landing of the Pilgrims.
- Joan of Arc Statue Committee, American Numismatic Society, French Institute in the United States, and Hobby Club. 1913. Joan of Arc loan exhibition catalogue: paintings, pictures, medals, coins, statuary, books, porcelains, manuscripts, curious, etc.: in the American Numismatic Society Building ... New York City, January 6 to February 8, 1913. New York: Wynkoop Hallenbeck Crawford Co. "The Hobby Club edition (only 35 copies printed) for the special meeting to be held on the evening of Saturday, January twenty-fifth, nineteen hundred and thirteen ... to view the Joan of Arc exhibition ..."—Added t.p. under the auspices of the Joan of Arc Statue Committee (for a statue of Joan of Arc in the city of New York), the Museum of French Art, French Institute in the United States, the American Numismatic Society.
- Hobby Club, New York. 1915. List of members. OCLC: 38232891.

== Bibliography ==
- HOBBY CLUB PROPOSED. By Marconi Wireless Telegraph to The New York Times. New York Times. New York, N.Y.: Nov 15, 1908 pg. 1.
- CONSERVATION OF HOBBIES. New York Times. New York, N.Y.: Dec 16, 1911 pg. 1. Abstract: The plan for the conservation of hobbies put in operation by the recent formation of a Hobby Club within another club is wholly commendable and deserves to be imitated. We cannot all belong to this Hobby Club, but we can organize similar clubs for ourselves and meet to conserve and develop our fancies for collecting or constructing.
- Riders of Hobbies to Dine each Month; With Plenty of Chances for Every Member to Talk of His Pet Subject. New York Times. New York, N.Y.: Dec 17, 1911 pg. 1. Abstract: The Hobby Club, incorporated by a number of well-known New Yorkers, will hold its first dinner at the Metropolitan Club on the evening of Dec. 28. The club's membership is limited to fifty, and to become eligible one must mount some well defined hobby.
- WELL-KNOWN MEN WITH HOBBIES—AND PROUD OF IT. New York Times. New York, N.Y.: Feb 18, 1912 pg. 1. Abstract: BLESSED is the man who has a hobby," is a statement attributed to Lord Brougham, Lord High Chancellor of England, and one of her most distinguished parliamentarians and men of letters
