= Shakespearean tragedy =

Tragedies written by William Shakespeare

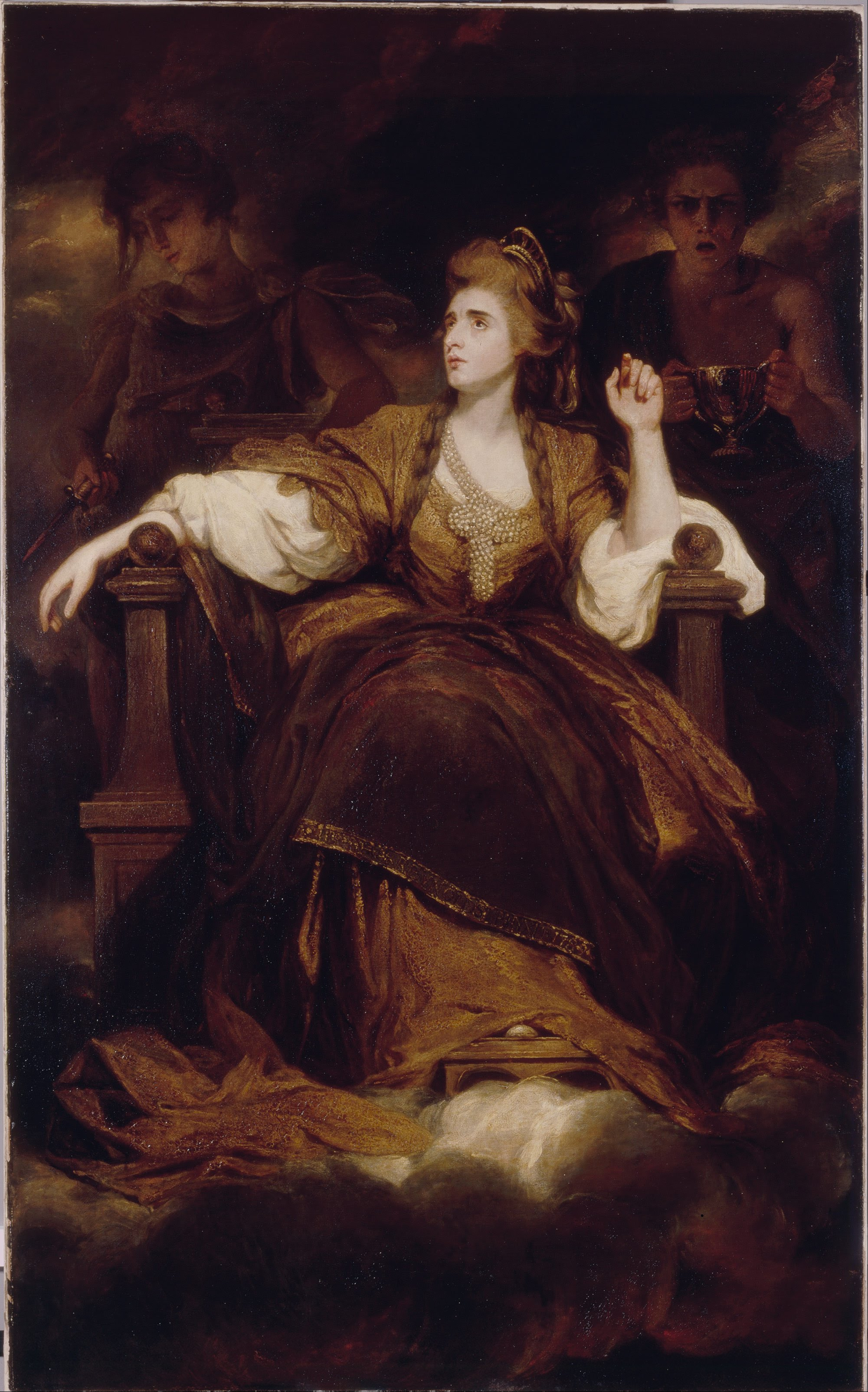
Sarah Siddons as the Tragic Muse, Joshua Reynolds (1784). Sarah Siddons (1755–1831) was an esteemed performer of Shakespearean tragedy.

Shakespearean tragedy is the designation given to most of William Shakespeare's tragedies. Many of his history plays share the qualifiers of a Shakespearean tragedy, but because they are based on real figures throughout the history of England, they were classified as "histories" in the First Folio. The Roman tragedies—Julius Caesar, Antony and Cleopatra and Coriolanus—are also based on historical figures, but because their sources were foreign and ancient, they are almost always classified as tragedies rather than histories. Shakespeare's romances (tragicomic plays) were written late in his career and published originally as either tragedy or comedy. They share some elements of tragedy, insofar as they feature a high-status central character, but they end happily like Shakespearean comedies. Almost three centuries after Shakespeare's death, English scholar Frederick S. Boas also coined a fifth category, the "problem play," for plays that do not fit neatly into a single classification because of their subject matter, setting, or ending. Scholars continue to disagree on how to categorize some Shakespearean plays.

== Chronology ==
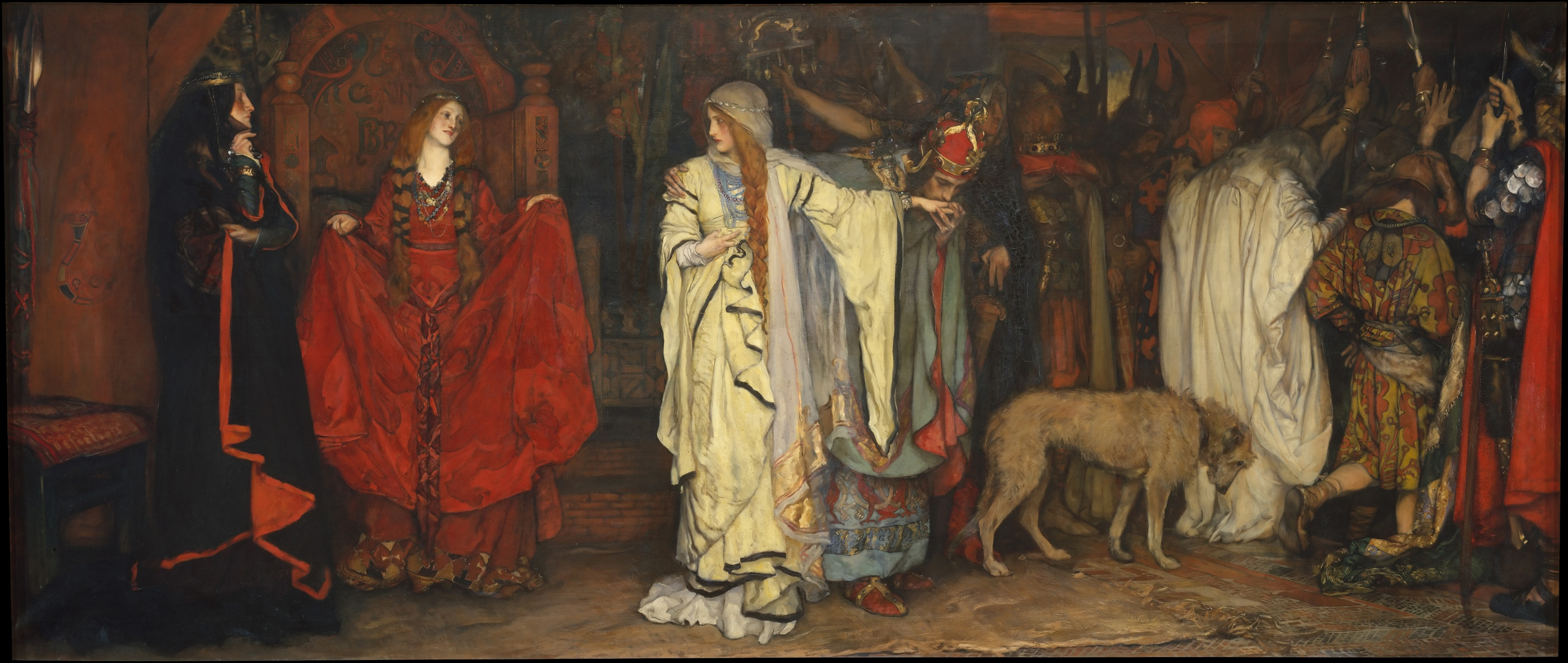
Edwin Austin Abbey (1852–1911) King Lear, Cordelia's Farewell

Below is the list of Shakespeare's plays listed as tragedies in the First Folio, along with the date range in which each play is believed to have been written.

Play	Terminus	
Play	post quem	ante quem
Titus Andronicus	1591	1593
Romeo and Juliet	1594	1595
Julius Caesar	1599	1600
Hamlet	1600	1601
Troilus and Cressida (Note: Troilus and Cressida was listed as a comedy in the First Folio, but is now classified as a tragedy.)	1601	1602
Othello	1604	1605
King Lear	1605	1606
Macbeth	1605	1606
Timon of Athens	1605	1608
Antony and Cleopatra	1606	1607
Coriolanus	1607	1608

== Influences and sources ==
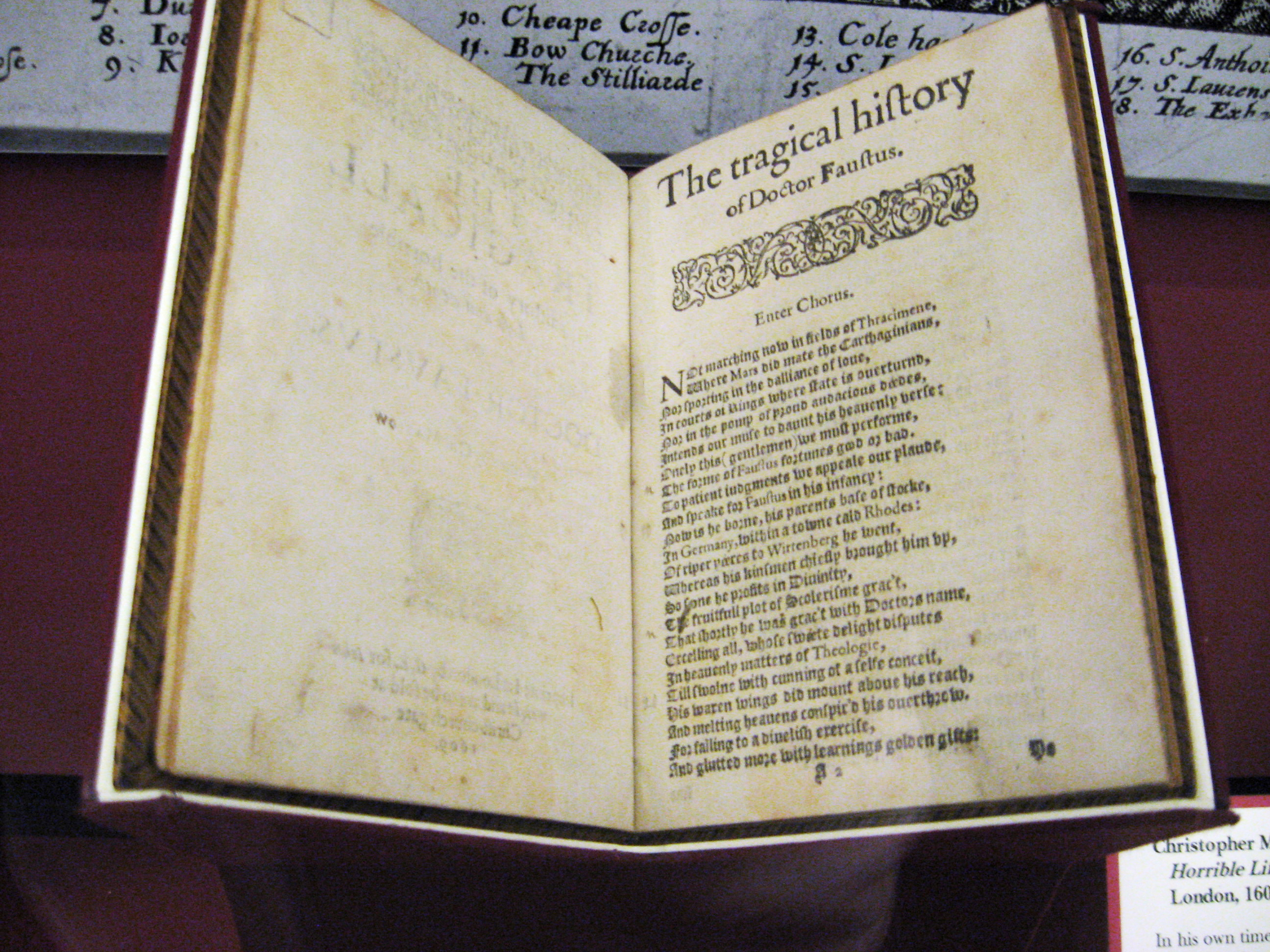
The Tragical History of the Life and Death of Doctor Faustus by Christopher Marlowe, in the Huntington Library, San Marino, California

The English Renaissance, when Shakespeare was writing, was fueled by a renewed interest in Roman and Greek classics and neighboring renaissance literature written years earlier in Italy, France, and Spain. Shakespeare wrote the majority of his tragedies under the rule of James I, and their darker contents may reflect the general mood of the country following the death of Elizabeth I, as well as James's theatrical preferences. Shakespeare, as was customary for other playwrights in his day, used history, other plays, and non-dramatic literature as sources for his plays. Additionally, tragedy was a new and exciting theatrical phenomenon in the late 16th century, rather than an established and self-evident dramatic form; because of this, Shakespeare and his contemporaries' plays did not necessary fit into a single genre. In Elizabethan England there was no copyright law or protections against plagiarism, so characters, plots, and even whole phrases of poetry were considered common property. The majority of Shakespeare's tragedies are based on historical figures, with the exception of Measure for Measure and Othello, which are based on narrative fictions by Giraldi Cintio. The historical basis for Shakespeare's Roman plays comes from The Lives of Noble Grecians and Romans by Plutarch, whereas the source of Shakespeare's Britain-based plays and Hamlet (based on the Danish Prince Amleth) derive from Holinshed's Chronicles. Furthermore, the French author Belleforest published The Hystorie of Hamblet, Prince of Denmarke in 1582, which includes specifics from how the prince pretended madness, to how the prince stabbed and killed the King's counsellor who was eavesdropping on Hamlet and his mother behind the arras in the Queen's chamber. The story of Lear appears in Geoffrey of Monmouth's Historia regium Britanniae c. 1135, and then in John Higgins' poem The Mirror for Magistrates in 1574, as well as appearing in Holinshed's Chronicles in 1587. Some events that happen in Shakespeare's King Lear were inspired by various episodes of Philip Sidney's Arcadia from 1590, while the nonsensical musings of Edgar's "poor Tom" heavily reference Samuel Harsnett's 1603 book, A Declaration of Egregious Popish Impostures.

== Contemporary tragedy ==
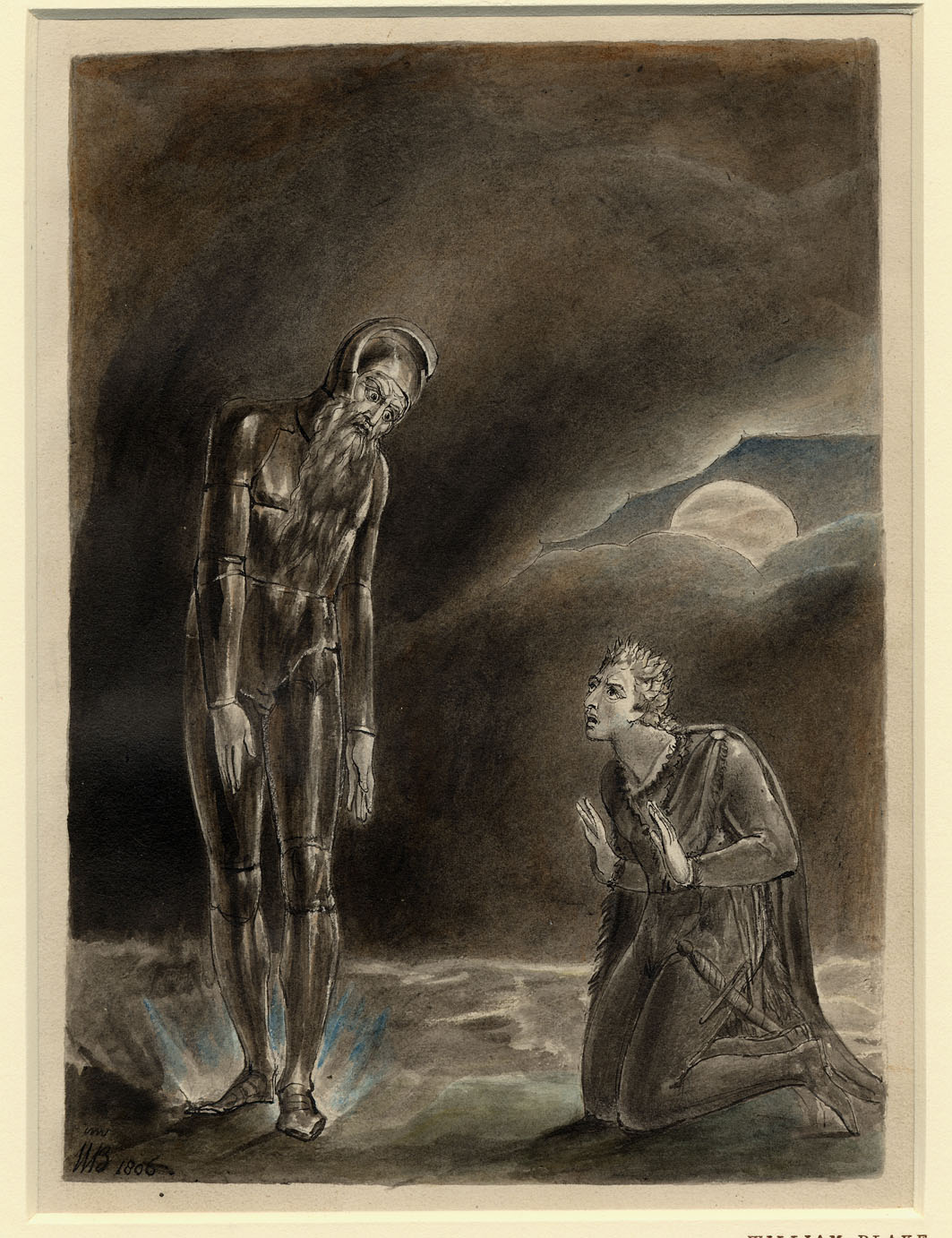
Hamlet and his Father's Ghost, William Blake (1806)

Tragedies from these eras traced their philosophical essence back to the Senecan tragedy, grounded in nobles who have a tragic flaw or commit a grave error (hamartia) which leads to their reversal of fortune (peripeteia). (However, some critics have argued that the "pseudo-Aristotelian" concept of the tragic flaw does not apply to Shakespeare's tragic figures.) Revenge tragedy was another increasingly popular genre in this age; Shakespeare's Hamlet is one example of this. Plays of this age were also decidedly secular, in contrast to the religious morality plays which, by this time, were outlawed by Elizabeth I. One marked difference between English renaissance tragedies and the classics that inspired them was the use and popularity of violence and murder on stage.

Select exemplary (non-Shakespearean) Elizabethan and Jacobean tragedies:

- The Spanish Tragedy by Thomas Kyd
- The Jew of Malta by Christopher Marlowe
- Tamburlaine by Christopher Marlowe
- Doctor Faustus by Christopher Marlowe
- Antonio's Revenge by John Marston
- The Revenger's Tragedy by Thomas Middleton
- 'Tis Pity She's a Whore by John Ford

== Sources ==
- Boas, Frederick S. (1910). Shakespere and his Predecessors. University manuals. John Murray. OCLC 939680633.
- Brockett, Oscar G.; Hildy, Franklin J. (2007). History of Theatre (9th ed.). Boston: Pearson Education. ISBN 978-0205358786.
- Bryson, Bill (2007). Shakespeare: The World as Stage. Eminent Lives. New York: HarperCollins. ISBN 978-0-06-074022-1. OCLC 136782567.
- Dunton-Downer, Leslie; Riding, Alan (2004). Essential Shakespeare Handbook. New York: Dorling Kindersley. ISBN 978-0789493330.
- Foakes, R. A., ed. (1997). King Lear. Arden Shakespeare, third series. Cengage Learning. ISBN 1903436591.
- Hoy, Cyrus, ed. (1992). Hamlet. Norton critical editions. New York: W. W. Norton & Company. ISBN 978-0-393-31642-1.
- Mowat, Barbara A.; Werstine, Paul, eds. (2013). The Tragedy of Julius Caesar. New York: Folger Shakespeare Library. ISBN 978-1-4391-9671-7.
