= Spelling of Shakespeare's name =

Spelling of the English playwright's name

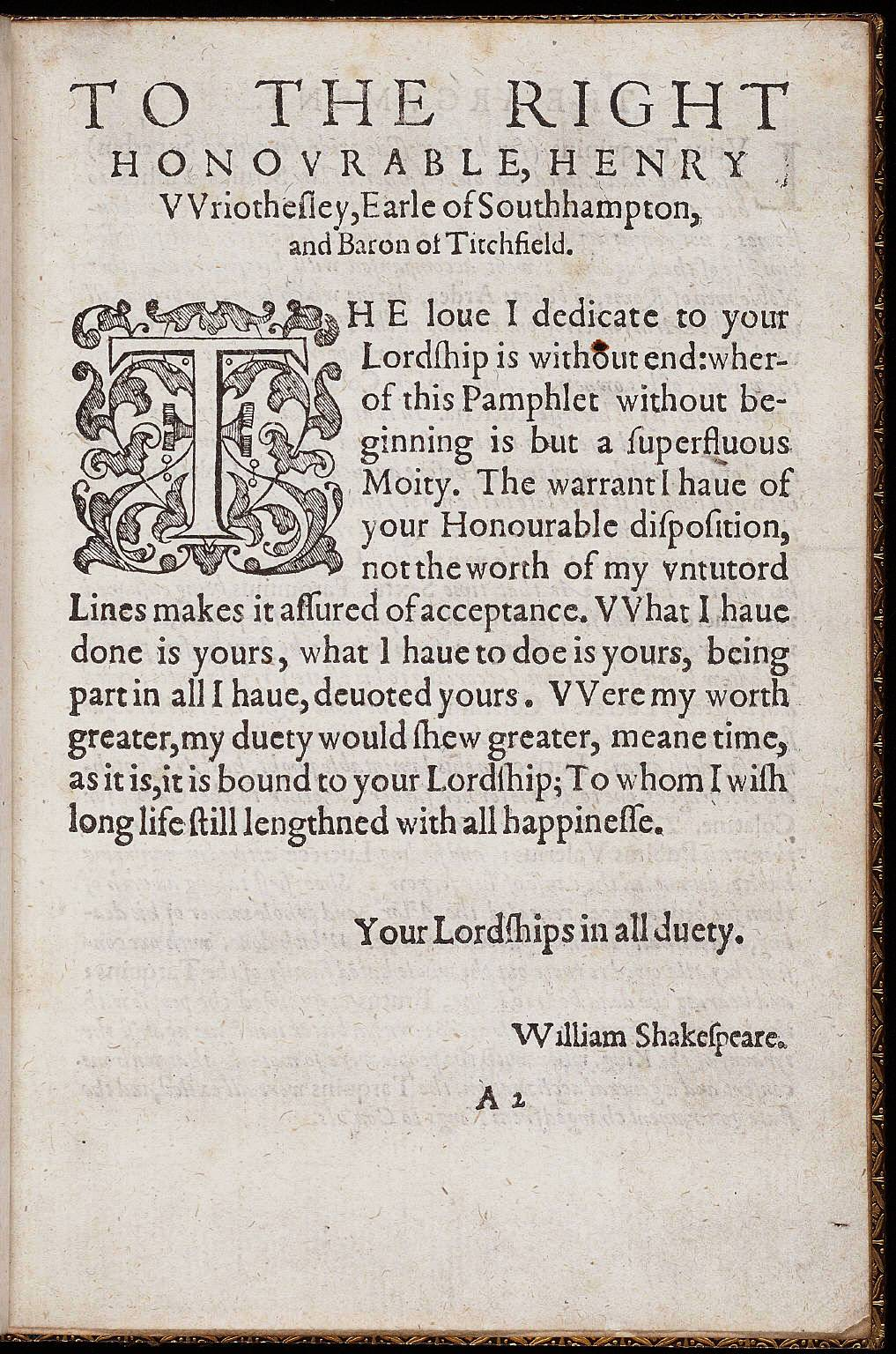
Shakespeare's printed signature as it appears in The Rape of Lucrece, printed by fellow Stratfordian Richard Field

The spelling of William Shakespeare's name has varied over time. It was not consistently spelled any single way during his lifetime (1564–1616), including by Shakespeare himself, in manuscript or in printed form; historians note that this was not unusual for documents in the Elizabethan era. After his death, the name was spelled variously by editors of his work, and there was no fixed spelling until well into the 20th century.

The standard spelling of the surname as "Shakespeare" was the most common published form in Shakespeare's lifetime, but it was not one of the inconsistent variations used in his own handwritten signatures. It was, however, the spelling used as a printed signature to the dedications of the first editions of his poems Venus and Adonis in 1593 and The Rape of Lucrece in 1594. It is also the spelling used in the First Folio, the definitive collection of his plays published in 1623, after his death.

The spelling of the name was later modernised, "Shakespear" gaining popular usage in the 18th century, which was largely replaced by "Shakspeare" from the late 18th through the early 19th century. In the Romantic and Victorian eras the spelling "Shakspere", as used in the poet's own signature, became more widely adopted in the belief that this was the most authentic version. From the mid-19th to the early 20th century, a wide variety of spellings were used for various reasons; although, following the publication of the Cambridge and Globe editions of Shakespeare in the 1860s, "Shakespeare" began to gain ascendancy. It later became a habit of writers who believed the fringe theory that proposes up to 80 others who are the "someone else" who wrote the plays to use different spellings when they were referring to the "real" playwright and to the man from Stratford-upon-Avon. With rare exceptions, the spelling is now standardised in English-speaking countries as "Shakespeare".

== Shakespeare's signatures ==
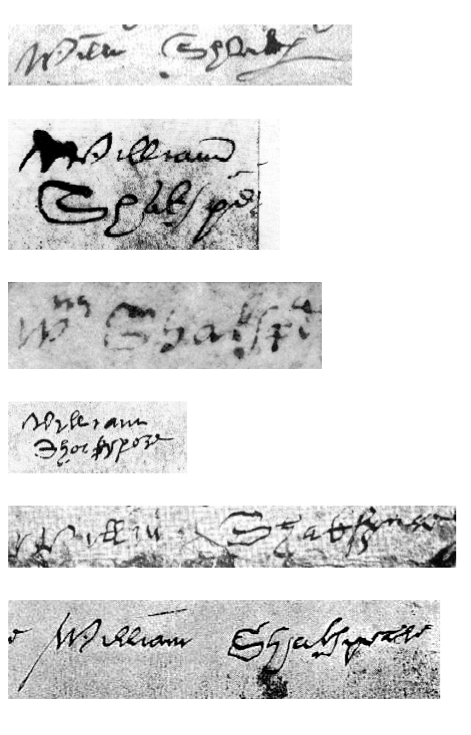
Shakespeare's six surviving signatures are all from legal documents.

There are six surviving signatures written by Shakespeare himself. These are all attached to legal documents. The six signatures appear on four documents:

- a deposition in the Bellott v Mountjoy case, dated 11 May 1612
- the purchase of a house in Blackfriars, London, dated 10 March 1613
- the mortgage of the same house, dated 11 March 1613
- his Last Will & Testament, which contains three signatures, one on each page, dated 25 March 1616

The signatures appear as follows:

- Willm Shakp
- William Shaksper
- Wm Shakspe
- William Shakspere
- Willm Shakspere
- By me William Shakspeare

Most of these are abbreviated versions of the name, using breviographic conventions of the time. This was common practice. For example Edmund Spenser sometimes wrote his name out in full (spelling his first name Edmund or Edmond), but often used the abbreviated forms "Ed: spser" or "Edm: spser".

The three signatures on the will were first reproduced by the 18th-century scholar George Steevens, in the form of facsimile engravings. The two relating to the house purchase were identified in 1768, and the document itself was acquired by Edmond Malone. Photographs of these five signatures were published by Sidney Lee. The final signature was discovered by 1909 by Charles William Wallace.

Though not considered genuine, there is a signature on the fly-leaf of a copy of John Florio's translation of the works of Montaigne, which reads "Willm. Shakspere"; it was accepted by some scholars until the late 20th century. Another possibly authentic signature appears on a copy of William Lambarde's Archaionomia (1568). Though smudged, the spelling appears to be "Shakspere".

== Other spellings ==
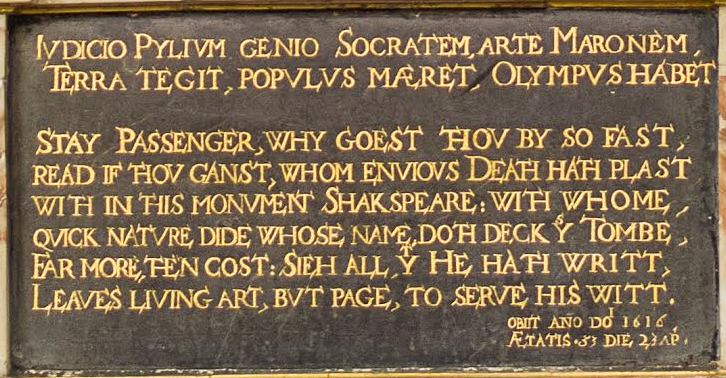
The memorial plaque on Shakespeare's tomb in the Church of the Holy Trinity, Stratford-upon-Avon. His name is spelled "Shakspeare". Next to it, the inscription on the grave of his widow Anne Hathaway calls her the "wife of William Shakespeare".

The writer David Kathman has tabulated the variations in the spelling of Shakespeare's name as reproduced in Samuel Schoenbaum's William Shakespeare: A Documentary Life. He states that of "non-literary references" in Shakespeare's lifetime (1564–1616) the spelling "Shakespeare" appears 71 times, while "Shakespere" appears second with 27 usages. These are followed by "Shakespear" (16); "Shakspeare" (13); "Shackspeare" (12) and "Shakspere" (8). There are also many other variations that appear once or in small numbers. Critics of Kathman's approach have pointed out that it is skewed by repetitions of a spelling in the same document, gives each occurrence the same statistical weight irrespective of context, and does not adequately take historical and chronological factors into account.

R.C. Churchill notes that name variations were far from unusual in the Elizabethan era:

The name of Sir Walter Raleigh was written by his contemporaries either Raleigh, Raliegh, Ralegh, Raghley, Rawley, Rawly, Rawlie, Rawleigh, Raulighe, Raughlie, or Rayly. The name of Thomas Dekker was written either Dekker, Decker, Deckar, Deckers, Dicker, Dickers, Dyckers, or (interestingly enough) Dickens.

Kathman notes that the spelling is typically more uniform in printed versions than in manuscript versions, and that there is a greater variety of spelling in provincial documents than in metropolitan ones.

== Printed spellings ==
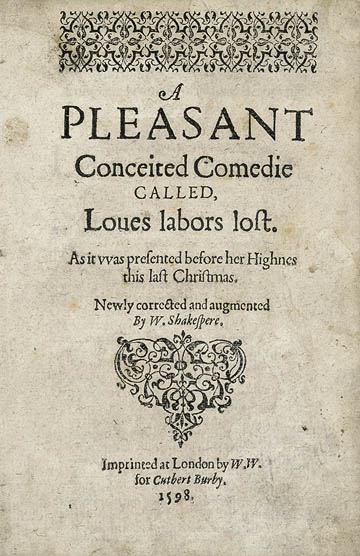
The title page of the 1598 edition of Love's Labour's Lost in which the name is spelled "Shakeſpere", using a long s in the middle

Fifty-eight quarto (or Q) editions of Shakespeare's plays and five editions of poetry were published before the First Folio. On 20 of the plays, the author is not credited. On 15 title pages, his name is hyphenated, "Shake‑speare", 13 of these spellings being on the title pages of just three plays, Richard II (Q2 1598, Q3 1598, Q4 1608, and Q5 1615), Richard III (Q2 1598, Q3 1602, Q4 1605, Q5 1612, and Q6 1622), and Henry IV, Part 1 (Q2 1599, Q3 1604, Q4 1608, and Q5 1613). A hyphen is also present in the first quarto of Hamlet (1603) and the second of King Lear (1619). The name printed at the end of the poem The Phoenix and the Turtle, which was published in a collection of verse in 1601, is hyphenated, as is the name on the title page and the poem A Lover's Complaint of Shake-speares Sonnets (1609). It is used in the cast list of Ben Jonson's Sejanus His Fall, and in six literary allusions published between 1594 and 1623.

The unhyphenated spelling "Shakespeare" (or Shakeſpeare, with a long s) appears on 22 of the 58 quartos. It is spelled this way in the first quartos of The Merchant of Venice (1600), A Midsummer Night's Dream (1600), Much Ado About Nothing (1600), The Merry Wives of Windsor (1602), Pericles, Prince of Tyre (1609), Troilus and Cressida (1609), Othello (1622). The second, or "good", quarto of Hamlet (1604) also uses this spelling. It is also spelled this way on the misattributed quarto of Sir John Oldcastle (1600; 1619) and on the verse collection The Passionate Pilgrim (1599).

Rarer spellings are "Shak‑speare" on the first quarto of King Lear (1608), and "Shakeſpere", in the first quarto of Love's Labour's Lost (1598). On the misattributed quarto A Yorkshire Tragedy (1608) his name is spelled "Shakſpeare", a spelling that also appears on the quarto of The Two Noble Kinsmen (1634), which was published after the First Folio.

James S. Shapiro argues that Shakespeare's name caused difficulties for typesetters, and that is one reason why the form with the "e" in the centre is most commonly used, and why it is sometimes hyphenated. Kathman argues that any name that could be divided into two clear parts was liable to be hyphenated, especially if the parts could be interpreted as distinct words.

== Spellings in later publications ==
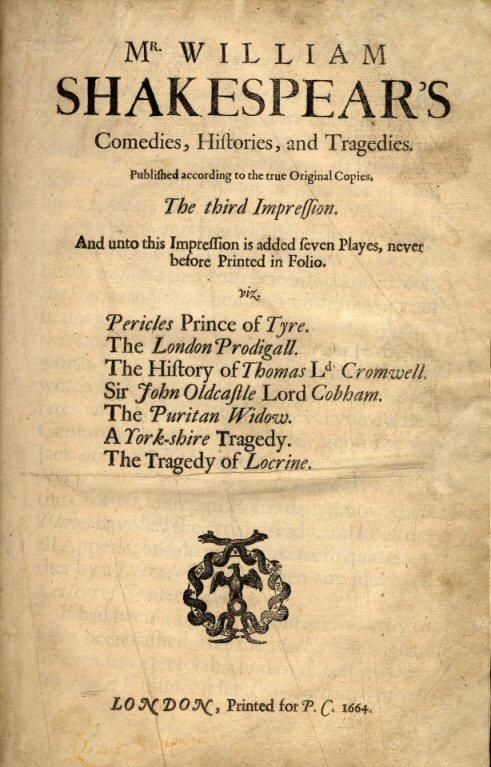
The additional plays section in the 1664 Third Folio, using the spelling that was preferred in the English Augustan era

Later editions of Shakespeare's works adopted differing spellings, in accordance with fashions of modernised spelling of the day, or, later, of attempts to adopt what was believed to be the most historically accurate version of the name. When he was referred to in foreign languages, he acquired even more variant spellings. 18th-century French critics were known to use "Shakpear, Shakespehar, Shakespeart, or Shakees Pear."

=== Shakespear ===
A shift from "Shakespeare" to the modernised spelling "Shakespear" occurs in the second printing of the Third Folio, published in 1664 by Philip Chetwinde. This retained the original title page, but included a section with additional plays. The title page of this new add-on adopted the new spelling. It was also adopted by other authors of the Restoration Era. John Downes and Nahum Tate both use the spelling.

This was followed by 18th-century writers. Shakespeare's first biographer, Nicholas Rowe, also spelled the name "Shakespear", in his book Some Account of the Life &c. of Mr. William Shakespear (1709) and in his new edition of the works. This spelling was followed by Alexander Pope in his edition of the Works of Shakespear (1725) and George Sewell (The Works of Mr. William Shakespear). The spelling with an "e" at the end persisted, however. Pope's rival Lewis Theobald retained it in his edition, Shakespeare Restored (1726), which pointedly rejected attempts to modernise and sanitise the original works.

The "Shakespear" spelling continued to be used by scholars throughout the 18th century, including William Warburton. However, many, like Theobald, preferred the First Folio spelling, most notably Samuel Johnson. "Shakespear" was less widely used into the 19th and 20th centuries, increasingly by advocates of rational spelling. William Hazlitt used it in his book Characters of Shakespear's Plays. George Bernard Shaw, a strong advocate of spelling reform, insisted on the use of this spelling in all his publications.

=== Archaising spellings ===
==== Shakspeare ====
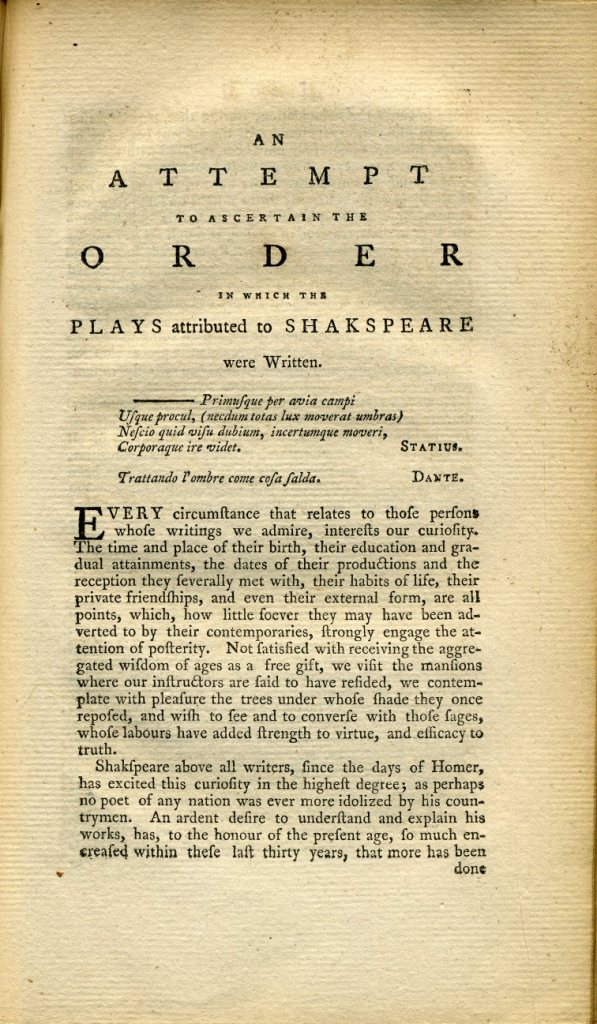
Edmond Malone used the spelling "Shakspeare", which was most common in the Georgian era.

Archival material relating to Shakespeare was first identified by 18th-century scholars, most notably Edmond Malone, who recorded variations in the spelling of the name. Malone declared a preference for the spelling "Shakspeare", using it in his major publications including his 1790 sixteen-volume edition of the complete works of the playwright. George Steevens also used this spelling. Steevens and Malone had both examined Shakespeare's will, and were convinced that the final signature was spelled this way, which also conformed to the spelling used on Shakespeare's tomb. However, Malone admitted that the signature was difficult to read and that the others were clearly spelled without the final "a". This spelling continued to be popular throughout the later Georgian period. Indeed "virtually every edition" of the playwright's work in the early 19th century before 1840 used this spelling. Even German scholars such as Friedrich Schlegel and Ludwig Tieck adopted it.

The antiquarian Joseph Hunter was the first to publish all known variations of the spelling of the name, which he did in 1845 in his book Illustrations of the Life, Studies, and Writings of Shakespeare. He gives an account of what was known at the time of the history of the name of Shakespeare, and lists all its variant forms, including the most idiosyncratic instances such as "Shagsper" and "Saxpere". He linked this to a history of the Shakespeare family and its descendants, though he was not able to add much to the material already identified by Edmond Malone. Hunter noted that "there has been endless variety in the form in which this name has been written." He criticised Malone and Steevens, writing that "in an evil hour they agreed, for no apparent reason, to abolish the e in the first syllable." Hunter argued that there were probably two pronunciations of the name, a Warwickshire version and a London version, so that "the poet himself might be called by his honest neighbours at Stratford and Shottery, Mr. Shaxper, while his friends in London honoured him, as we know historically they did, with the more stately name of Shakespeare." Kathman argues that while it is possible that different pronunciations existed, there is no good reason to think so on the basis of spelling variations.

==== Shakspere ====
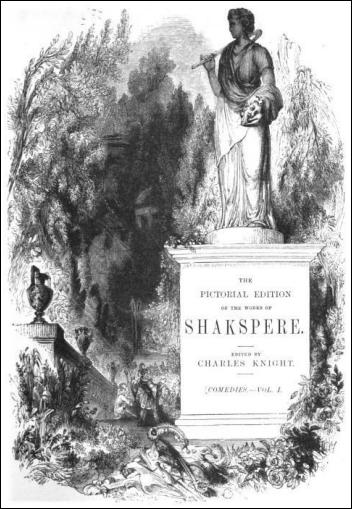
Title page of Knight's Pictorial Shakspere, 1867 edition

According to Hunter it was in 1785 that the antiquarian John Pinkerton first revived the spelling "Shakspere" in the belief that this was the correct form as "traced by the poet's own hand" in his signatures. Pinkerton did so in Letters on Literature, published under the pen-name Robert Heron. However, a later scholar identified a reference in The Gentleman's Magazine in 1784 to the deplorable "new fashion of writing Shakespeare's name SHAKSPERE", which suggests that the trend had been emerging since Steevens published facsimiles of the signatures in 1778. Nevertheless, Pinkerton gave it wide circulation. The "Shakspere" spelling was quickly adopted by a number of writers and in 1788 was given official status by the London publisher Bell in its editions of the plays. Samuel Taylor Coleridge, who published a large quantity of influential literature on the playwright, used both this and the "Shakspeare" spelling. His major works were published after his death with the new spelling. The spelling continued to be preferred by many writers during the Victorian era, including the Pre-Raphaelite Brotherhood in The Germ.

The matter was widely debated. The Gentleman's Magazine became the forum for discussion of the topic. There was a heated debate in 1787, followed by another in 1840 when the spelling was promoted in a book by Frederic Madden, who insisted that new manuscript evidence proved that the poet always wrote his name "Shakspere". Isaac D'Israeli wrote a strongly worded letter condemning this spelling as a "barbaric curt shock". There followed a lengthy correspondence, mainly between John Bruce, who insisted on "Shakspere" because "a man's own mode of spelling his own name ought to be followed" and John William Burgon, who argued that "names are to be spelt as they are spelt in the printed books of the majority of well-educated persons", insisting that this rule authorised the spelling "Shakspeare". Various other contributors added to the debate. A number of other articles covered the spelling dispute in the 19th century, in which the "Shakspere" spelling generally was promoted on the grounds that it was the poet's own. Albert Richard Smith in the satirical magazine The Month claimed that the controversy was finally "set to rest" by the discovery of a manuscript which proved that the spelling changed with the weather, "When the sun shone he made his 'A's, / When wet he took his 'E's." In 1879 The New York Times published an article on the dispute, reporting on a pamphlet by James Halliwell-Phillipps attacking the "Shakspere" trend.

Many of the most important Victorian Shakespeare publishers and scholars used this spelling, including Charles Knight, whose The Pictorial Edition of the Works of Shakspere was very popular, and Edward Dowden, in Shakspere: a critical study of his mind and art. In Britain the New Shakspere Society was founded in 1873 by Frederick James Furnivall and, in America, the Shakspere Society of Philadelphia adopted the spelling. The former folded in 1894, but the latter still exists under its original name. The spelling was still common in the early to mid 20th century, for example in Brander Matthews', Shakspere as a Playwright (1913), Alwin Thaler's Shakspere to Sheridan (1922), and T.W. Baldwin's Shakspere's five-act structure (1947).

=== Shakespeare ===
The spelling "Shakespeare" was vigorously defended by Isaac D'Israeli in his original letter to the Gentleman's Magazine. Joseph Hunter also expressly stated it to be the most appropriate spelling. D'Israeli argued that the printed spellings of the poems would have been chosen by the author. He also insisted that the spelling represents the proper pronunciation, evidenced by puns on the words "shake" and "spear" in Shakespeare's contemporaries. Hunter also argued that the spelling should follow established pronunciation and pointed to the poems, stating that "we possess printed evidence tolerably uniform from the person himself" supporting "Shakespeare".

Although Dowden, the most influential voice in Shakespearean criticism in the last quarter of the 19th century, used the spelling "Shakspere", between 1863 and 1866 the nine-volume The Works of William Shakespeare, edited by William George Clark, John Glover, and William Aldis Wright, all Fellows of Trinity College at the University of Cambridge, had been published by the university. This edition (soon generally known as "The Cambridge Shakespeare") spelled the name "Shakespeare". A related edition, including Shakespeare's text from the Cambridge Shakespeare but without the scholarly apparatus, was issued in 1864 as "The Globe Edition". This became so popular that it remained in print and established itself as a standard text for almost a century. With the ubiquity and authority of the Cambridge and Globe editions, backed by the impeccable academic credentials of the Cambridge editors, the spelling of the name as "Shakespeare" soon dominated in publications of works by and about Shakespeare. Although this form had been used occasionally in earlier publications, and other spellings continued to appear, from that point "Shakespeare" gained the dominance which it retains to this day.

== Shakespeare authorship question ==
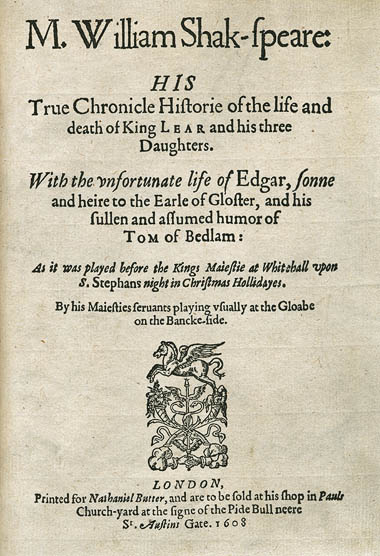
Title page of the first quarto of King Lear (1608) with a hyphenated spelling of the name

When the advocates of the Shakespeare authorship question began to claim that someone other than Shakespeare of Stratford wrote the plays, they drew on the fact that variant spellings existed to distinguish between the supposed pseudonym used by the hidden author and the name of the man born in Stratford, who is claimed to have acted as a "front man".

The use of different spellings was sometimes simply a convenience, to clarify which "Shakespeare" was being discussed. In other cases it was linked to an argument about the meaning supposed to be attached to "Shakespeare" as a pseudonym. In some instances it arose from a belief that different spelling literally implied, as R.C. Churchill puts it, "that there must have been two men: one, the actor, whom they mostly call 'Shaksper' or 'Shakspere', the other the real author (Bacon, Derby, Rutland, etc.) whom they call 'Shakespeare' or 'Shake-speare' (with the hyphen)." In some cases there were even imagined to be three Shakespeares: the author, the actor and the Stratford man.

The choice of spelling for the Stratford man varied. Because he is known to have signed his name "Shakspere" when writing it out in full, this is the spelling sometimes adopted. However, H.N. Gibson notes that outlandish spellings seem sometimes to be chosen purely for the purpose of ridiculing him, by making the name seem vulgar and rustic, a characteristic especially typical of Baconians such as Edwin Durning-Lawrence:

This hatred [of the Stratford man] not only takes the form of violent abuse and the accusation of every kind of disreputable conduct, but also of the rather childish trick of hunting up all the most outlandish Elizabethan variations of the spelling of his name, and filling their pages with "Shagspur", "Shaxpers", and similar atrocities; while Sir Edwin Durning-Lawrence concludes each chapter in his book with the legend "Bacon is Shakespeare" in block capitals.

Some authors claim that the use of a hyphen in early published versions of the name is an indication that it is a pseudonym. They argue that fictional descriptive names (such as "Master Shoe-tie" and "Sir Luckless Woo-all") were often hyphenated in plays, and pseudonyms such as "Tom Tell-truth" were also sometimes hyphenated. Kathman argues that this is not the case, and that real names were as likely to be hyphenated as pseudonyms. He states that the pseudonym "Martin Marprelate" was sometimes hyphenated, but usually not. Robert Waldegrave, who printed the Marprelate tracts, never hyphenated the name, but did hyphenate his own: "If hyphenation was supposed to indicate a pseudonym, it is curious that Waldegrave repeatedly hyphenated his own name while failing to hyphenate an undisputed pseudonym in the same texts."

== See also ==
- List of Shakespeare plays in quarto
- Miguel de Cervantes Saavedra, Shakespeare's contemporary, signed his surname as Cerbantes.
- Chespirito was a Mexican actor. His stage name means "little Shakespeare" as pronounced in colloquial Spanish: "Chespir" + diminutive -"ito".
