= Shakespeare: The World as Stage =

2007 book by Bill Bryson

- Author: Bill Bryson
- Language: English
- Series: Eminent Lives
- Genre: Non-fiction, biography
- Publisher: HarperCollins
- Publication date: 2007
- Media type: Print (hardcover, paperback), Audiobook
- Pages: 199 pp
- ISBN: 978-0-06-074022-1
- OCLC: 136782567
- Dewey Decimal: 822.3/3 B 22
- LC Class: PR2895 .B79 2007

Shakespeare: The World as Stage is a biography of William Shakespeare by Bill Bryson. The 199-page book is part of HarperCollins' series of biographies, "Eminent Lives". The focus of the book is to state what little is known conclusively about Shakespeare, and how this information is known, with some discussion of disproved theories, myths, and that which is believed by the public but not provable. It also explores the political, social, cultural and economic background to Shakespeare's work.

The book is also available as an unabridged audiobook, published by Harper Audio and read by the author.

== Content ==
Bryson discusses a wide range of matters relating to Shakespeare, his time and work, for example the Chandos portrait and the existence (or not) of Anne Whateley. The book also addresses the colorful history, characters, and conspiracy theories behind the Shakespeare authorship question and explores Shakespeare's 'lost years'.

In the work he cites scholars such as Stephen Greenblatt, Frank Kermode, Edmond Malone, Samuel Schoenbaum, Caroline Spurgeon and Charles William Wallace.

== Critical reception ==
Nancy Dalva wrote in The New York Observer: "Right off, the author's established his blithe and sunny tone: If a trio of witches were cooking up this book in a cauldron, there'd be a pinch of P. G. Wodehouse, a soupçon of Sir Osbert Lancaster and a cup of Sir Arthur Conan Doyle. One can be firm of purpose and blithe at the same time, it turns out; one can write a seriously entertaining book."

Tom Payne's review in London's Telegraph was more critical. Payne thought that the book was "an accessible, sensible" life of Shakespeare but felt that the author should have discussed his personal feelings about the subject. Payne also noted that Bryson provided a significant amount of factual detail concerning Shakespeare's plays and vocabulary but failed to reach any conclusion. The review concluded by stating that the book worked as a companion to other books which examined Shakespeare's body of work but recommended Frank Kermode's The Age of Shakespeare (2004) as a superior alternative.
