= Silver Street, London =

Street in medieval London, England

Coordinates: 51.51735°N 0.09454°W

Silver Street was a street in London. It ran from the north end of Noble Street at Falcon Square to Wood Street. It originated in medieval times. It is one of the streets shown on a map known as the "Woodcut map of London", formerly attributed to Ralph Agas, which gives us a representation of London in the sixteenth century.

The inhabitants of Silver Street included the Mountjoy family with whom William Shakespeare lodged at the beginning of the 17th century. According to Charles Nicholl, who has written a detailed analysis of Shakespeare's life on Silver Street, their house can be identified on the "Woodcut map". The Mountjoys were Huguenots who ran a business making luxury headgear for ladies. These items included theatrical costumes, which is possibly how the family came into contact with Shakespeare. Alternatively, they could have met through Richard Field with whom Shakespeare grew up in Stratford. Field became a printer in London after being apprenticed to a Huguenot printer and marrying his widow.

Another resident was John Wolfall, who lived there in the 1590s. Ostensibly a skinner, Wolfall´s main activity was arranging loans.

During the Second World War the Cripplegate area, where the street was located, was virtually destroyed in the Blitz.

== Legacy ==
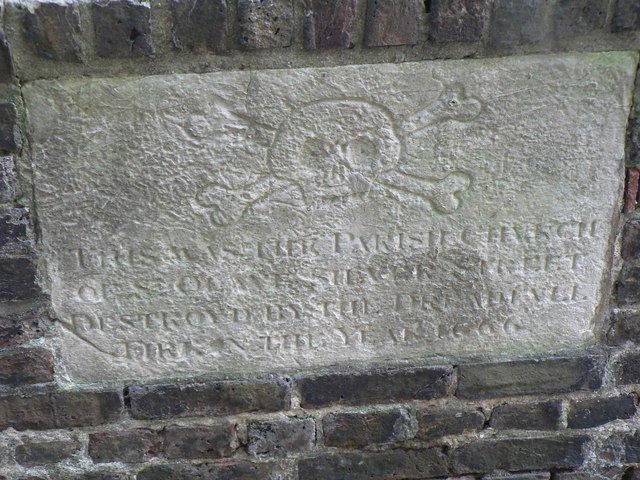
"This was the Parish Church of St. Olave Silver Street, Destroyed by the Dreadfull Fire in the Year 1666"

A commemorative stone marks the site of St Olave's Church, Silver Street, which was destroyed in the Great Fire of London.

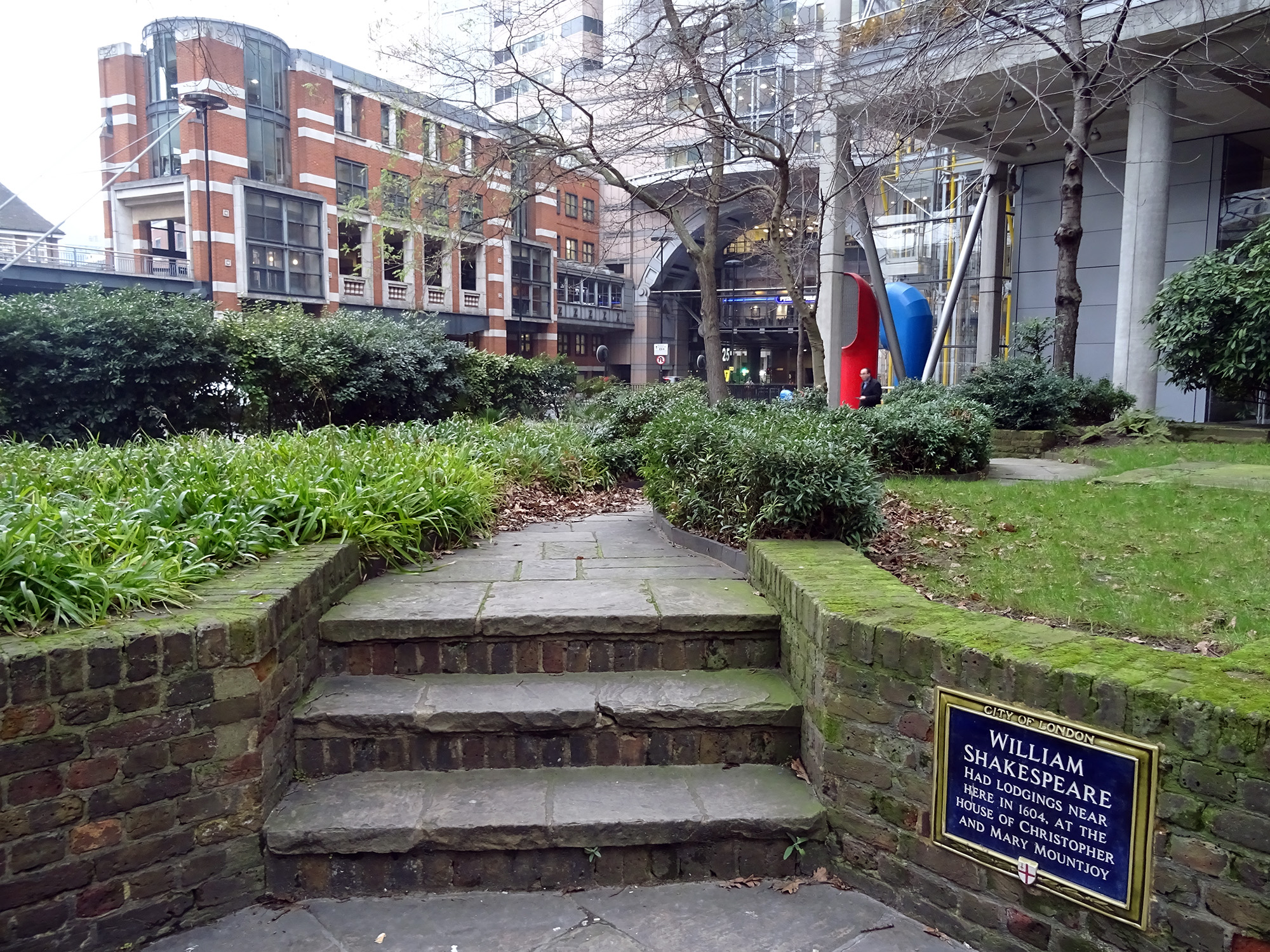
Plaque on Noble Street commemorating Shakespeare and the Mountjoys

On 21 April 2016, the City of London installed a blue plaque in Noble Street, near the site of the Mountjoys' house. The plaque reads "William Shakespeare had lodgings near here in 1604, at the house of Christopher and Mary Mountjoy".
