= New York Mineralogical Club =

Organization in New York City

The New York Mineralogical Club, Inc. is the oldest continually-operating mineral club in the United States. The club was founded by George Frederick Kunz, Benjamin B. Chamberlin and Professor Daniel S. Martin, on September 21, 1886, in the home of Professor Daniel S. Martin at 236 West 4th Street, New York City. The club's collection of more than 700 mineral specimens from New York City is stored at the American Museum of Natural History and includes a large 6 inch (15 cm) almandine garnet called the Subway Garnet discovered in 1885.

The New York Mineralogical Club is affiliated with the American Federation of Mineralogical Societies (AFMS, Organized 1947) and a member of the Eastern Federation of Mineralogical and Lapidary Societies, Inc. (EFMLS, Organized 1950).

The club has EIN 35-2928901 as a 501(c)(3) Public Charity.
