= George Frederick Kunz =

American mineralogist (1856–1932)

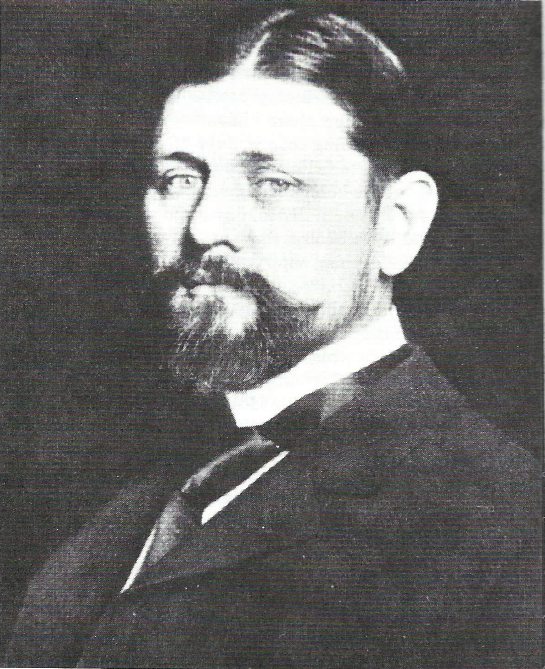
- Born: 29 September 1856; New York City, US
- Died: 29 June 1932 (aged 75)
- Resting place: Trinity Church Cemetery, at Broadway and 153rd Street, New York
- Other name: George Kuntz
- Education: Cooper Union
- Employer(s): Tiffany & Co. and U.S. Geological Survey

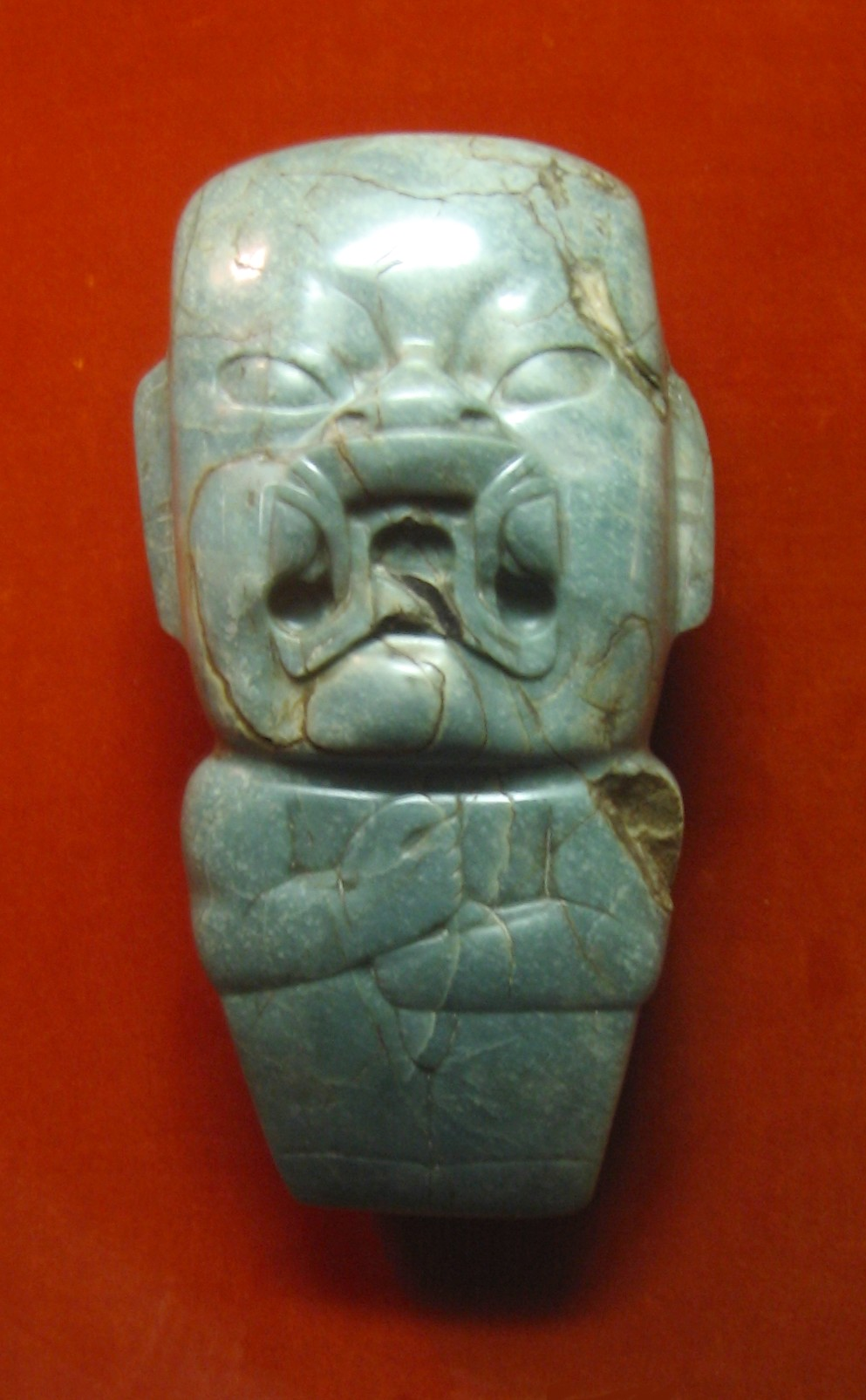
A typical Olmec votive (ritual) axe with the were-jaguar motif (note the downturned mouth and the almond-shaped eyes). This particular artifact is known as the Kunz Axe, first described by George Kunz in 1890.

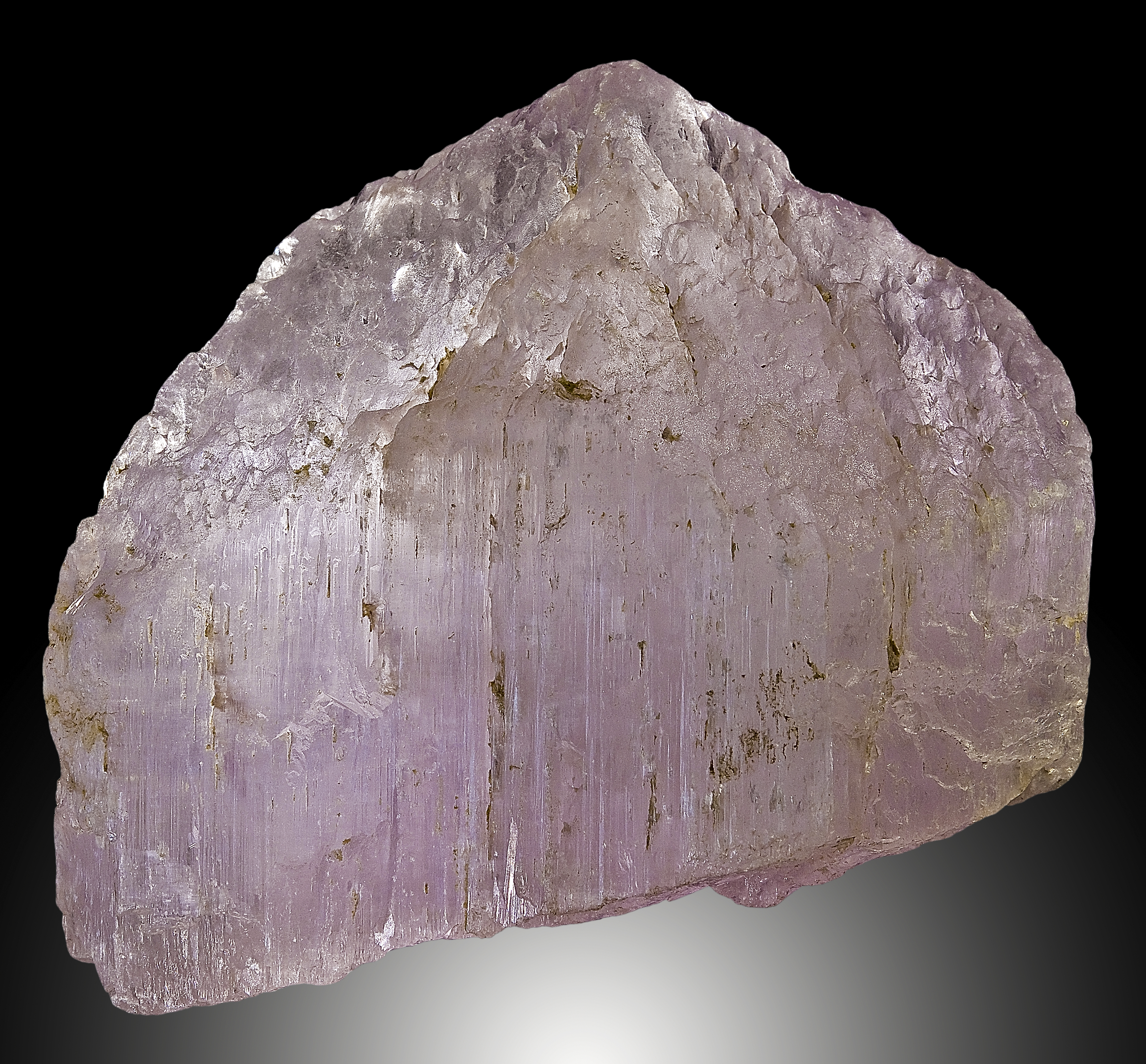
Kunzite from Nuristan

George Frederick Kunz (September 29, 1856 – June 29, 1932) was an American mineralogist and mineral collector.

== Biography ==
Kunz was born in New York City and began an interest in minerals at a very young age. By his teens, he had amassed a collection of over four thousand items, which he sold for four hundred dollars to the University of Minnesota. Kunz attended Cooper Union but did not finish and did not attend college. Nonetheless, he taught himself mineralogy from books and field research. This expertise landed him a job with Tiffany & Co., and his knowledge and enthusiasm propelled him into a vice presidency by the time he was 23. He gained much notoriety for identifying a new gem variety of the mineral spodumene which was named kunzite in his honor. He also supervised the cutting of the very large stone that became the Tiffany Yellow Diamond.

He headed up the US mining and mineralogical exhibits at the international expositions in Paris (1889), Chicago (1893), Atlanta (1895), Paris (1900), and St. Louis (1904). He gave a series of eight lectures on "Precious Stones" for the Lowell Institute's 1894–95 season. As a gentleman scientist, he was a member of the Mineralogical Society of America, the American Association for the Advancement of Science, New York Academy of Sciences (of which he was once a vice president), the New York Mineralogical Club, the American Scenic and Historic Preservation Society (for which he served as president), the American Chemical Society, the American Institute of Mining and Metallurgical Engineers (of which he was once a vice president), and many other cultural, scientific, and naturalist organizations.

He was the founder and president of the Museums of the Peaceful Arts in 1913, special agent for the US Geological Survey (1883–1909), a research curator at the Museum of Natural History in New York City, and the leading advocate in the establishment of the international carat as a unit of measure for precious gems. He also assembled the Morgan-Tiffany collection of gems in the American Museum of Natural History. Kunz had an active life dedicated to science and public service.

Kunz promoted the adoption of the decimal metric system of weights and measures in the United States and was President of the American Metric Association.

He wrote over 300 articles during his life. More than ninety years after his death, many of his books are still in print.

Kunz married Sophia Hanforth in 1879, who died in 1912. In 1923, Kunz married Opal Logan Giberson, a noted aviator, but the marriage was annulled in 1929. Nonetheless, Opal Kunz continued to maintain Kunz's household until his death, on June 29, 1932.

== Awards ==
He was given many honorary degrees from US and European universities. He was awarded a Bachelor of Science degree from the Cooper Union in 1872.

- Columbia University (AM, June 8, 1898) The award was presented by Professor James F. Kemp, professor of Geology at Columbia;
- University of Marburg (Ph.D., 1903), especially for his contributions to European and German mineralogy. Surprisingly, in 1920, in a highly unusual act, this honorary award was withdrawn by the university faculty due [according to Dr. Kunz] to his efforts to help reforest France, and his supposed sympathies to the French and English allies against Germany.
- Knox College of Illinois (Sc. D., 1907).

== Personal library ==
After his death, his personal collection of several thousand rare books, pamphlets and articles on gems and precious stones were sold to the United States Geological Survey Library for one dollar. Acquired by the Library in 1933, the George F. Kunz Collection is a significant special collection on gems and minerals including rare books on gemology, the folklore of gemstones through history, lapidary arts and archival gem trade records important to the provenance of named stones such as the "Hope Diamond."

In December 2012, the discovery of a rare photographic album dated 1922 among the books from Mr Kunz' personal library was announced by the USGS. The album contained 81 photographs of the Russian Crown Jewels and pre-dates the official catalog by the Soviet government by 3 years. Researchers have identified four pieces of jewelry that were documented in 1922 that were not included in the later catalog and that are assumed missing today.

== Selected writings ==
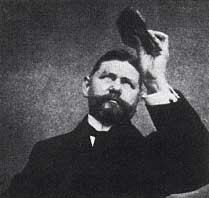
Kunz examining what may be kunzite

- Kunz, George F. and Charles Hugh Stevenson (1869-?). The Book of the Pearl: The History, Art, Science and Industry of the Queen of Gems. New York: The Century Co., 1908. 548 pages, 125 plates and illustrations (17 colored); maps.
- Kunz, George F. Catskill Aqueduct Celebration Publication: A Collection of Pamphlets Published in Connection with the Celebration of the Completion of the Catskill Aqueduct, being Chiefly Catalogues of Exhibitions Held by Art, Scientific and Historical Museums and Institutions in New York City in Cooperation with the Mayor’s Catskill Aqueduct Celebration Committee in 1917. Arranged by George Frederick Kunz, Chairman of the Committee on Art, Scientific and Historical Exhibitions. New York: The Mayor's Catskill Aqueduct Celebration Committee. 1917. 266 pages, illustrations including maps, facsimiles, portraits.
- Kunz, George F. 1913. Curious Lore of Precious Stones: Being a Description of their Sentiments and Folk Lore, Superstitions, Symbology, Mysticism, Use in Medicine, Protection, Prevention, Religion, and Divination, Crystal Gazing, Birth Stones, Lucky Stones and Talismans, Astral, Zodiacal and Planetary. Philadelphia: J. B. Lippincott Co. 1913. Six color plates (including the tissue-guarded frontispiece), scores of double-tone photographs and inter-textual line cuts. 406 pages, 86 illustrations in color, doubletone and in-line.

Group: Charlotte Stillman, Mrs. Elgin R. L. Gould, Mrs. W. Eyre Lambert, Mrs. H. P. Davidson, George Frederick Kunz, and William Fellowes Morgan. c. 1910-1915

- Kunz, George Frederick (1888). "Diamonds in Meteorites". Science. ns-11 (266): 118–119. doi:10.1126/science.ns-11.266.118-a. PMID 17799324. S2CID 40675694.
- Kunz, George Frederick (January–March 1891). "Exhibition of Gems Used as Amulets, etc". The American Journal of Folklore. 4 (12). American Folklore Society: 29–31. doi:10.2307/532930. JSTOR 532930.
- Kunz, George Frederick. "The genesis of the diamond" Science, pp. 450–456, 1897
- Baskerville, Charles; Kunz, G F. "Kunzite and its unique properties" American Journal of Science, vol.18, no.103, pp. 25–28, July 1904
- Kunz, George Frederick. "The cause of the San Francisco earthquake" Annals of the New York Academy of Sciences, pp. 289–290, 1908
- Kunz, George Frederick. "Diamonds in North America" Geological Society of America Bulletin, vol.42, no.1, pp. 221–222, March 1931.
- Kunz, George F. Gems and Precious Stones of North America: A Popular Description of Their Occurrence, Value, History, Archaeology, and of the Collections in Which They Exist; Also a Chapter on Pearls, and on Remarkable Foreign Gems Owned in the United States. Illustrated with eight colored plates and numerous minor engravings. New York: The Scientific Publishing Co. 1890. 336 pages. Second edition with Appendix, 367 pp. 24 Pls., 1892.
- Kunz George F. Gems, Jewelers’ Materials, and Ornamental Stones of California. Bulletin of the California State Mining Bureau. 1905. California State Mining Bureau, Bulletin #37. 171 pages. 1905. (K480(276) K96) Also published as a second edition with a slightly changed title: "Semi-precious Stones, Gems, Jewelers’ Materials and Ornamental Stones of California." "The report referred to is Kunz’s Gems, Jeweler’s Materials and Ornamental Stones of California, 1905. Even the publication of this work evoked controversy. Kunz’s name does not appear on the title page nor the outside of the book. However, Lewis Aubury, State Mineralogist of California, does give Kunz a thank you in print for all his efforts. Kunz, although he must have been upset by the snub, according to tradition, promptly obtained a quantity of the reports for personal distribution, had them bound in a kunzite-pink cloth, and had his name stamped on the title page and cover!" Pages 36–44 give a summary of the diamond occurrences in California.
- Kunz, George Frederick. History of the Gems Found in North Carolina. Raleigh: E.M. Uzzell & Co., public printers and binders, 1907. xvii, 60 p., 15 pages of plates, 4 colored plates. Bulletin (North Carolina Geological and Economic Survey); no. 12. North Carolina Geological and Economic Survey. A hard bound copy of this item is also held in the Kunz Collection of the USGS Library, but is not cataloged. [302] A thorough report, prepared by Kunz at the behest of the North Carolina authorities in time for distribution at the Jamestown [Virginia] Exposition. The illustrations include a number of notable specimens, some drawn from the Morgan-Tiffany and Morgan-Bement Collections at the American Museum of Natural History. The four color plates, for which this work is especially noted, were printed by Prang. Pages 5–9 discusses the history of various diamond occurrences. Gemology bibliographer John Sinkankas states, "The photographs are of very good quality, but it is the richly colored lithographs that make this work as highly prized for them as for the text. ..Plate 3 facing page 9 depicts what was then the largest emerald crystal mined in North Carolina; it is the same that was stolen in 1950 from the American Museum of Natural History in New York and never recovered. Also upon this plate, pasted in its upper right-hand corner, is a small rectangle of a diamond crystal from Dysortville, while the plate numeral of "III" is obviously an erased area which bore some other number, now unknown." Of all of Kunz's major works, "History of the Gems Found in North Carolina" is by far his rarest book in the antiquarian book market.
- Kunz, George F. Ivory and the Elephant in Art, in Archaeology, and in Science. Garden City, NY: Doubleday, Page & Co. Pages: 527. 1916. Illustrated with over 150 full-page plates, four folding plates and maps, text illustrations. Kunz's classic study of the procuring and working of ivory, from the ancient period to modern times. Chapters on evolution and development of the elephant, on elephant hunting and on the art and commerce of ivory carving. The book is dedicated to Prof. Alfred Lacroix, curator of the Mineralogical Department of the Muséum d’Histoire Naturelle, Paris. This is the most scarce of all Dr. Kunz' works, and includes information not found in other publications by Dr. Kunz. There were at least three editions of this book printed. After the public edition, a separate edition was published first for the "Belgian Congo Edition," then a third copy run was published for the "Hobby Club", established 1911.
- Kunz, George F. The Magic of Jewels and Charms. Philadelphia: J. B. Lippincott Company. 1915. 422 pages with 90 illustrations in color, doubletone and line. Facts and fancies about a fascinating subject, including anecdotal history and research from India to the Americas. "Magic jewels and electric gems; meteorites or celestial stones; stones of healing; fabulous stones; concretions and fossils; snake stones and bezoars; charms of ancient and modern times; facts and fancies about precious stones. Each profusely illustrated in color, doubletone and line. Octavo. Handsome cloth binding, gilt top, in a box..."
- Kunz, George F. Natal Stones; Sentiments and Superstitions Associated with Precious Stones. New York: Tiffany & Co. 1891. (American Museum of Natural History’s copy signed by Dr. Kunz on October 8, 1927). This interesting little book helped sell many precious and semi-precious stones associated with birthdays. The first edition had 15 pages, and gradually expanded over the years, reaching a high of 40 pages. The final 31st edition appeared in 1931.
- Kunz, George F. "Remarkable Crystal Skull." Exchanger's Monthly: Devoted to Mineralogy, Geology and Archaeology. Jersey City, NJ. Volume II, Number 12, October 1887, page 95. Read before the meeting of the New York meeting of the American Association for the Advancement of Science, August 12, 1887. Mr. Kunz relates the provenance of the skull, and proposes that the rock crystal came from California and is made in a Mexican fashion.
- Kunz, George F. "Reminiscences of Dr. George Frederick Kunz as Told to Marie Benyon Bey." Journal of the Geo-Literary Society. "American Travels of a Gem Expert." Volume 15, number 2, pages 6–14, May 2000; "American Travels of a Gem Collector, Parts 1&2." Volume 15, number 3, pages 10–19, August 2000; "Part III: Reminiscences of Dr. George F. Kunz- American Travels of a Gem Collector as Told to Marie Beynon Ray (From the Saturday Evening Post, January 21, 1928)" Volume 15, number 4, pages 15–24. "Indestructible Value…" Volume 16, number 3, pages 14–24, 2001. Reprint of his Saturday Evening Post series, from 1927 and 1928.
- Kunz, George F. "On Phosphorescent Diamonds [Tiffanyite]." Read before the academy on May 20, 1895. Transactions of the New York Academy of Sciences. Volume 14, page 260. 1895. Also Mineralogical Magazine. Volume 11, page 241. 1897. The various colors of diamonds are attributed to the presence of hydrocarbons, and phosphorescence and fluorescence of certain diamonds are attributed to a bluish white substance, which is undoubtedly a hydrocarbon, and for which the name Tiffanyite is proposed. See also: "Tiffanyite." Transactions of the New York Academy of Science, vol. 14.
- Kunz, George F. Rings for the Finger, from the Earliest Known Times to the Present, with Full Descriptions of the Origin, Early Making, Materials, the Archaeology, History, For Affection, For Love, For Engagement, For Wedding, Commemorative, Mourning, Etc. Philadelphia: J. B. Lippincott Company. 1917. Frontispiece is an oil painting of the Maharani of Sikkim (northeastern Hindustan), and illustrated with 381 pages, plates, partly colored, portraits, etc., plus a holographic facsimile letter from Admiral Peary to the author on the question of ring usage by Eskimo peoples. The Kunz Collection copy is inscribed by the author to his daughter, Bessie: "For Elizabeth Handforth Kunz, with the love of her father, the author, George Frederick Kunz, 30 January 1916. New York." A fine copy of a work that John Sinkankas says "remains the largest single storehouse of information on rings available in any language".
- Kunz, George F. Shakespeare and Precious Stones, Treating of the Known References of Precious Stones in Shakespeare's Works, With Comments as to the Origin of his Material, the Knowledge of the Poet Concerning Precious Stones, and References to Where the Precious Stones of His Time Came From. Philadelphia: J. B. Lippincott. 1916. 100 pages with illustrations, portraits, etc. "Treating of the known references to precious stones in Shakespeare’s works, with comments as to the origin of his material, the knowledge of the poet concerning precious stones, and references as to where the precious stones of his time came from. Four illustrations. Square octavo. Decorated cloth" [412] "Diamonds are discussed on pages 24-27, 73-76, 89-91 and 93. Interesting historical notes are given concerning the contemporary knowledge of gem-stones, the goldsmiths and jewelers of the period." The Central Park Shakespeare Garden Committee Edition, containing 4 extra pages with list of Committee and Cut of Garden. The Hobby Club Mission, containing a list of Hobby Club Members.
- Kunz, George F. "The Spanish Missions in California." Albany, NY: American Scenic and Historic Preservation Society. Seventeenth Annual Report, 1912. Appendix F, pages 387–410. Includes five plates. Dr. Kunz uses the occasion of the forthcoming Panama Exposition to press for the purchase of privately owned missions, the restoration of existing ones, and the renovation of El Camino Real, the old Spanish road that connected all the California missions together.
- Kunz, Dr. George F. (1897). Kuna, Edward S. (ed.). "Sapphires From Montana, With Special Reference to Those From Yogo Gulch in Fergus County". American Journal of Science. 4. 4. New Haven, CT: Yale University Department of Geology and Geophysics: 417–420. doi:10.2475/ajs.s4-4.24.417.

== Bibliography ==
- Ahlborn, Richard E. and Vera Beaver-Bricken Espinola, eds. Russian Copper Icons and Crosses From the Kunz Collection: Castings of Faith. Washington, DC: Smithsonian Institution Press. 1991. 85 pages with illustrations, some colored. Includes bibliographical references pages 84–85. Smithsonian Studies in History and Technology: No. 51.
- Burchard, Hank. "Wright Idea, Wrong Stuff." The Washington Post. June 10, 1988, page WE49. Discusses new display of the Kunz collection of Russian icons sold to the Smithsonian Institution.
- Conklin, Lawrence H. "On Kunz and Kunzite." Mineralogical Record. Volume 18, pages 369–372.
- Conklin, Lawrence H. "The Original Specimens of Kunzite." The Matrix: A Journal on the History of Minerals. Volume 1, number 3, page 45. An account of the first specimen of kunzite from Charles Baskerville's collection, used in 1903 in the original determination and naming of that species.
- Conklin, Lawrence H. "Curious Lore of George F. Kunz." Matrix: A Journal of the History of Minerals. Dillburg, PA. Volume 5 (3), 1997, pages 108–114.
- Conklin, Lawrence H. Notes and commentaries on letters to George F. Kunz: correspondence from various sources, including Clarence S. Bement: with facsimiles. New Canaan, Ct.: L. H. Conklin, 1986. 137 pages, ill., portraits; 29 cm. Title on spine: Letters to George F. Kunz. Bibliography: p. 137. Tiffany & Co. did a reprint of this limited edition book (only 150 copies) in 1987.
- Kunz, George Frederick (1883). "Precious Stones". Mineral Resources of the United States. 1882: 483–499.
- Kunz, George Frederick (1886). "Rare gems and interesting minerals". Transactions of the New York Academy of Sciences: 131–133.
- Diller, Joseph Silas and Kunz, G.F.; Kunz, GF (1887). "Is there a diamond field in Kentucky?". Science. ns-10 (241): 140–142. doi:10.1126/science.ns-10.241.140-d. PMID 17755042. S2CID 40332118.
- Kerr, Paul Francis. "Memorial of George Frederick Kunz [1856-1932]" American Mineralogist, vol. 18, no. 3, pp. 91–94, March 1933
- Purtell, Joseph. "[George F. Kunz] The All-American Collector." IN: The Tiffany Touch. New York: Pocket Books, Inc. (Originally published by Random House, in 1972). Pages 71–94. Evidently Mrs. Ruby Kunz Zinsser, Dr. Kunz's daughter, aided the author in his work, and told him her reminiscences of her father.
- Whitlock, Herbert Percy. "Memorial of George Frederick Kunz [1856-1932]" Geological Society of America Bulletin, vol.44, Part 2, pp. 377–394, April 1933
- Spencer, Leonard James. "George Frederick Kunz [1856-1932]" Quarterly Journal of the Geological Society of London, August 1933

NOTE: Mr. Kunz' personal library was acquired by the U.S. Geological Survey Library in 1933. The George F. Kunz Collection is a significant special collection on gems and minerals including rare books on gemology, the folklore of gemstones through history, lapidary arts and archival gem trade records important to the provenance of named stones such as the "Hope Diamond." Kunz was a former USGS employee. The collection is held in Reston, Virginia and is available to researchers by appointment.
