= Robert S. Brookings =

American businessman (1850–1932)

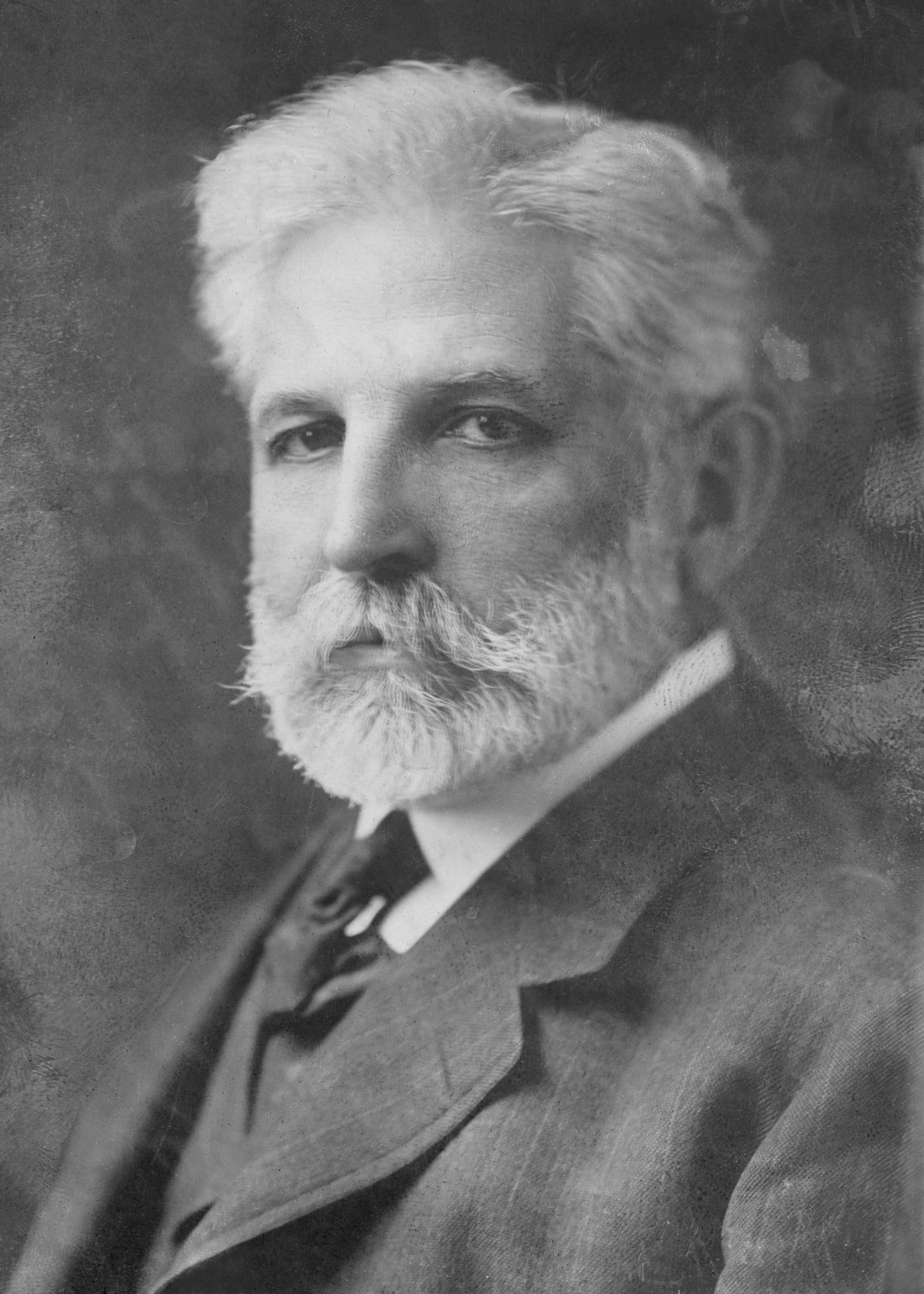
- Born: Robert Somers Brookings; January 22, 1850; Cecil County, Maryland, U.S.
- Died: November 15, 1932 (aged 82); Washington, D.C., U.S.
- Resting place: Bellefontaine Cemetery
- Spouse: Isabel Valle January (m. 1927)

Robert Somers Brookings (January 22, 1850 – November 15, 1932) was an American businessman and philanthropist, best known for his involvement with Washington University in St. Louis and his founding of the Brookings Institution.

== Early life, family and education ==
Brookings was born in Cecil County, Maryland, near Baltimore, where he was raised. His parents were Richard and Mary Eliza (Carter) Brookings. His physician father died when Robert was two years old, and money was scarce. Brookings attended high school for only one year. His mother died when he was 17 years old.

== Career ==
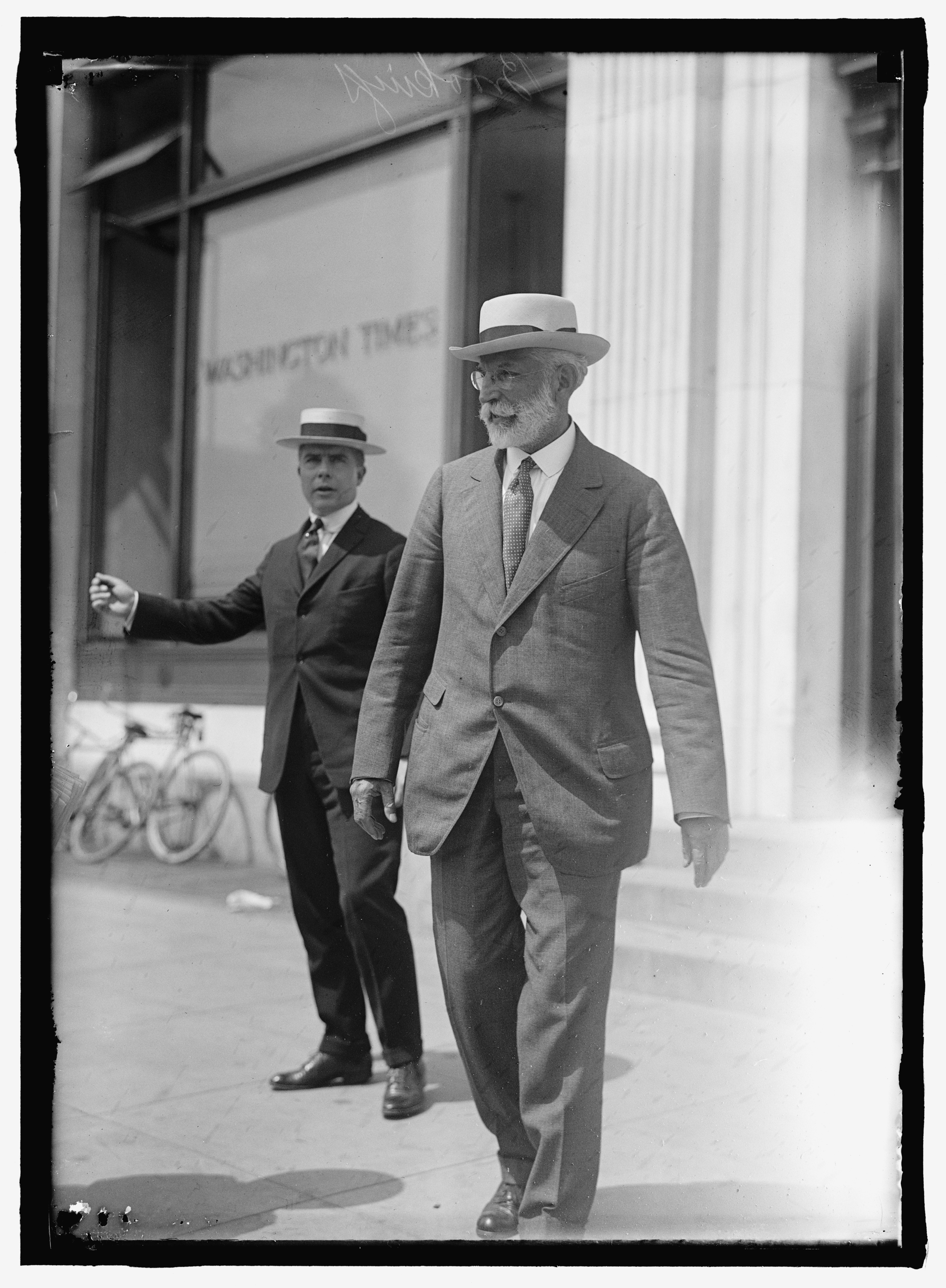
Brookings in 1917 during his tenure on the War Industries Board

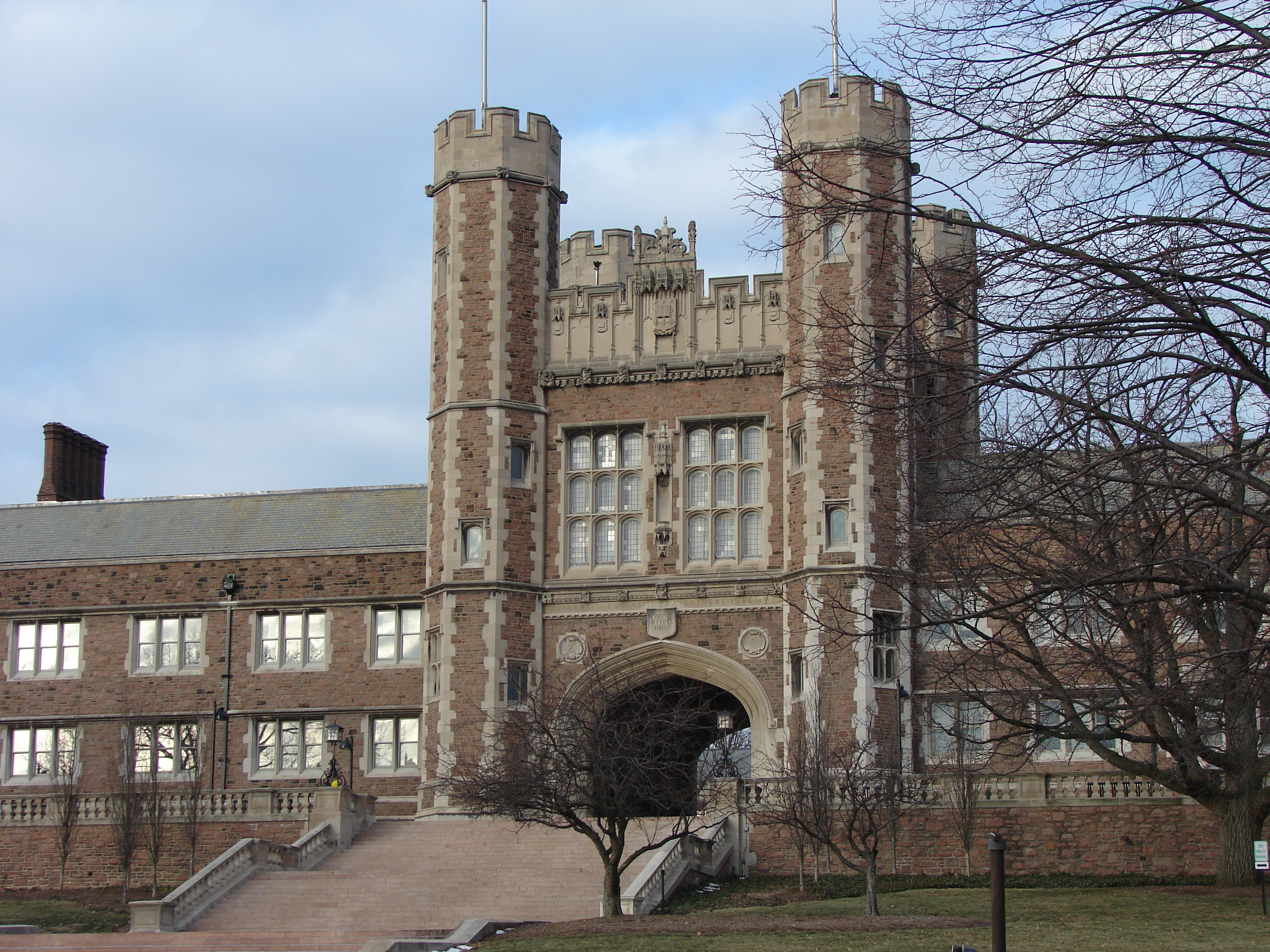
Brookings Hall at Washington University in St. Louis is named after Brookings.

At age 17, in 1867, he moved to St. Louis, where he joined his brother Harry as an employee of Cupples & Marston, a wholesale dealer of household goods. Robert worked as a clerk and also moonlighted as a bookkeeper. He earned $25 a month as a clerk and $10 a month as a bookkeeper. Robert practiced sales techniques and convinced Samuel Cupples to give him a salesman position, known as a drummer.

After four years of experience with Cupples & Marston, Robert and his brother started their own firm. Cupples agreed to make Robert a partner instead of losing him to a new company. By 1872, the two brothers were partners in the firm, and it prospered under their management. Brookings traveled the country for the company and Cupples dominated the woodenware trade. Brookings became a millionaire by the time he was 30 years old and was a vice-president at the company.

In 1895, Brookings constructed Cupples Station. Noticing that companies were paying to ship freight from railroads in the middle of St. Louis to warehouses along the river, Brookings decided to locate warehouses directly on the railroad, so trains could load and unload inside the warehouses themselves. Cupples Station had 18 warehouses designed by William Eames and Thomas Young. A separate endeavor from Cupples & Marston, the Station revolutionized shipping in St. Louis and served as a model for other cities. Building the station required buying eight blocks of property, which brought the company near bankruptcy. No U.S. banks would loan Brookings the money, but a British bank saved him with a $3 million loan.

=== Washington University ===
In 1895, Brookings began focusing on charitable and philanthropic endeavors. Brookings retired from business at age 46. Brookings was interested in education; he toyed with funding his own university, but decided to work with Washington University in St. Louis, which was under financial strain at the time.

In November 1895, Brookings was appointed chairman of the board of trustees of Washington University, where he remained a board member for the rest of his life. He donated over $5 million ($82 million in 2017 dollars) to the university in cash and property. Brookings helped transform the small school into a leading university with national prominence. He secured funding for one hundred acres that would become the university's Hilltop Campus. The university's administration building, Brookings Hall, is named for him.

By 1899, the university's endowment was stable. Brookings' friends, including William K. Bixby, Adolphus Busch, and Edward Mallinckrodt, assisted with the building campaign. All three have buildings named after them on the Washington University campus. Brookings rented out many of the new university buildings for the 1904 World's Fair. He also helped Washington University School of Medicine gain prominence and become one of the best in the country.

=== War Industries Board ===
In 1917, President Woodrow Wilson appointed Brookings to the War Industries Board, and later named him chairman of its Price Fixing Committee. In this role, he was the liaison between the U.S. government and many different industries. The board's role was to unify efforts to supply and distribute goods and food for the military. Brookings was awarded the U.S. Distinguished Service Medal, the French Legion of Honor, and the Order of the Crown of Italy for his wartime work.

=== Brookings Institution ===
In 1916, Brookings was appointed the first board chairman of the Institute for Government Research, an independent organization dedicated to political study. Brookings later secured funds from the Carnegie Corporation to establish the Institute of Economics. In 1928, Brookings contributed his own money to start a graduate school of economics and government. In 1928, the three organizations were combined to form the Brookings Institution, which was influential with the U.S. federal government's budget processes in the 1920s and, several decades later, with the Tax Reform Act of 1986. The Institution remains one of the leading think tanks in the United States. The organization's influence was so great in 1973 that President Nixon's administration plotted to burn it down.

== Author ==
Brookings wrote three books: Industrial Ownership (1925), Economic Democracy (1929), and The Way Forward (1932).

== Personal life ==
Brookings built three mansions in St. Louis and also had a country estate in what is now Affton, Missouri. In 1884, he purchased Kentucky Derby winner Aristides, eventually selling him prior to selling his farm in 1893.

He was a bachelor until he was 77 years old. In 1927, surprising his friends, he eloped with 51-year-old Isabel Valle January (1876–1965) of San Remo, Italy. They married in 1927, at an Episcopal Church. They had known each other for years, and she contributed a building to the Washington University School of Law and one as a headquarters for the Brookings Institution.

Brookings was an amateur violinist. He retired temporarily in his 30s and spent a year in Europe, during which time he studied violin with master violinist Joseph Joachim. Joachim advised Brookings to buy a renowned violin which has become known as the ‘Brookings’ Amati. When Brookings returned from his retirement, he stopped playing the violin. In 1938, the Brookings Amati was given to the Library of Congress by Isabel.

Brookings died at age 81 on November 15, 1932, at his home in Washington, D.C., after a two-week illness. He is buried at Bellefontaine Cemetery in St. Louis.

== Awards ==
Brookings was awarded honorary degrees from Yale University, Harvard University, the University of Missouri and Washington University.
