= St Olave's Church, Silver Street =

Coordinates: 51.5173°N 0.0953°W

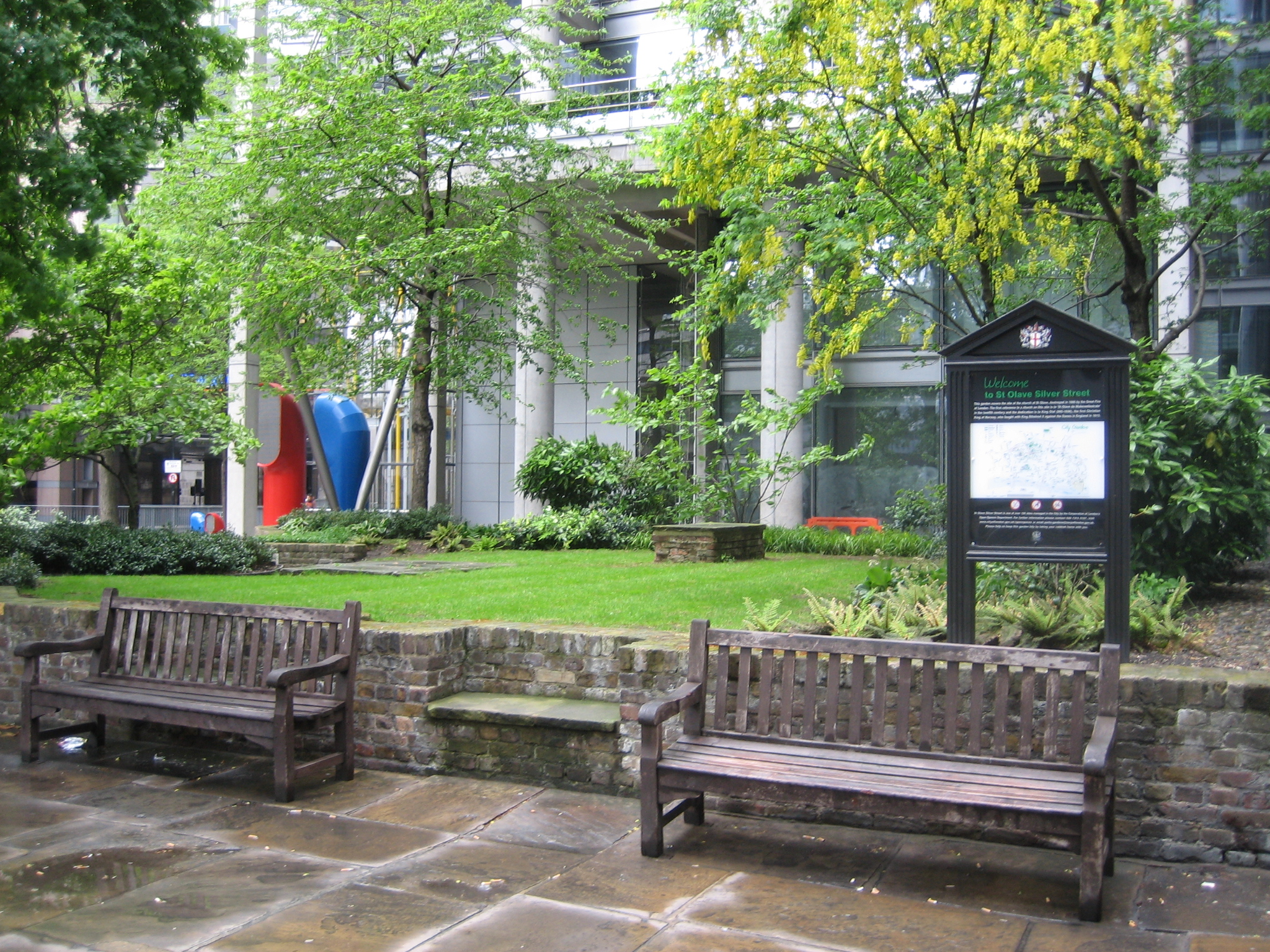
- Current photo of site
- St Olave's Church, Silver Street
- Location: London
- Country: England
- Denomination: Anglican
- Previous denomination: Roman Catholic

History
- Founded: 10th century
- Events: Destroyed by fire, 1666

St Olave's Church, Silver Street was a church on the south side of Silver Street, off Wood Street in the Aldersgate ward of the City of London. It was dedicated to St Olaf, a Norwegian Christian ally of the English king Ethelred II. The church was destroyed by the Great Fire of London in 1666 and not rebuilt.

== History ==
The first reference to the church, in the twelfth century, refers to it as "St Olave de Mukewellestrate" from its proximity to Monkwell Street. John Stow described it as "a small thing, without any noteworthy monuments". It was rebuilt in 1609 and repaired 1662, at a cost of £50 7s 6d.

It had a small churchyard, and owned another piece of land for burials in Noble Street, which, from its connection with the Barber Surgeons, was known as the "anatomizer's ground". From 1540 the Barber Surgeons carried out dissections at Monkwell Street for the purpose of anatomical teaching.

The church was destroyed in the Great Fire and not rebuilt. Instead the parish was united with that of St Alban, Wood Street. The site is now a garden, at the end of Noble Street. A late 17th-century tablet marks the spot where it once stood, off London Wall, near the Museum of London.

== Shakespeare’s Lodgings ==
William Shakespeare lived on Silver Street renting from Christopher and Mary Mountjoy with his tenancy commencing in 1604. The Mountjoys made luxury headdresses and theatrical costumes. It is thought he wrote King Lear, Othello and Measure for Measure whilst living there. Today, located in the gardens, there is a plaque marking Shakespeare’s habitation at the location.
