= Bellott v Mountjoy =

1612 English court case associated with William Shakespeare

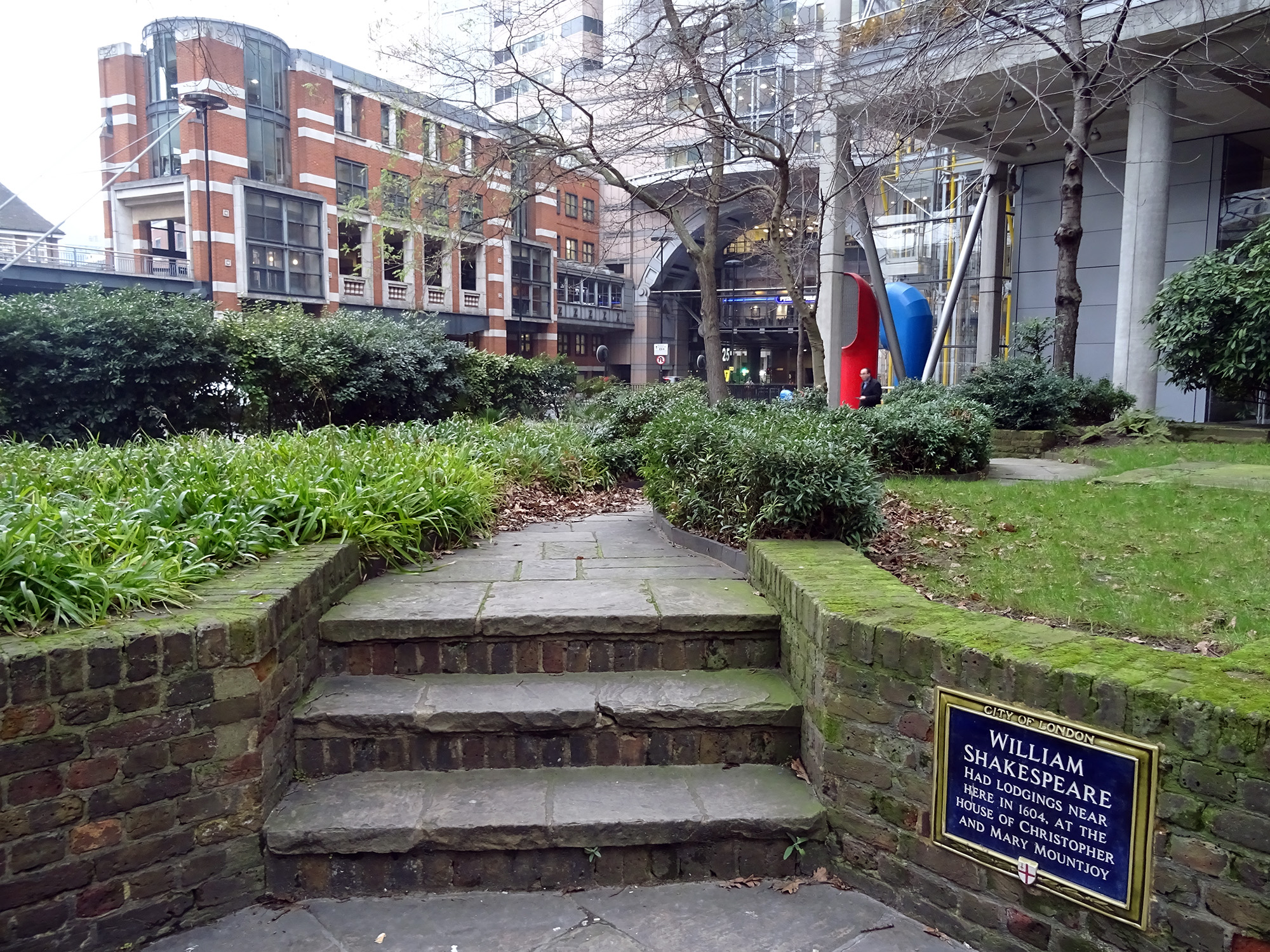
Northern end of Noble Street in the City of London. The plaque at bottom right reads " William Shakespeare had lodgings near here in 1604, at the house of Christopher and Mary Mountjoy"

Bellott v Mountjoy was a lawsuit heard at the Court of Requests in Westminster on 11 May 1612 that involved William Shakespeare in a minor role.

== Case detail ==
Stephen Bellott, a Huguenot, sued his father-in-law Christopher Mountjoy, a tyrer (a manufacturer of ladies' ornamental headpieces and wigs) for the financial settlement that had been promised at the time of his marriage with Mary Mountjoy in 1604: a dowry of £50, which had been promised but never paid, and an additional £200, to be bestowed upon Bellott in Mountjoy's will.

The records of the case were discovered in the Public Record Office (then in Chancery Lane, now part of the National Archives) in 1909 by the Shakespeare scholar Charles William Wallace and published by him in the October 1910 issue of Nebraska University Studies. The importance of this minor case is that Shakespeare was a material witness in it; his signed deposition of evidence was among the papers. Several of the other witnesses referred to Shakespeare's role in arranging the betrothal and in the negotiations about the dowry. He had been requested to take on the duties by Mountjoy's wife, Marie (who was also known as Mary, see note^{1}). The papers supply a roster of persons with whom Shakespeare was personally acquainted: the Mountjoys and their household and neighbours, including George Wilkins, the playwright and brothel-keeper who may have been Shakespeare's collaborator on Pericles, Prince of Tyre. The papers show that in 1604, Shakespeare was a lodger in the Mountjoys' house, at the corner of Silver and Monkwell Streets in Cripplegate, London. It is the only evidence yet found of a particular London address at which Shakespeare lived.

In his deposition, Shakespeare admitted that he had played the role as go-between in the courtship of Stephen Bellott and Mary Mountjoy that other witnesses described. However, he said that he could not remember the crucial financial arrangements of the Bellott/Mountjoy marriage settlement. Without that key testimony, the Court of Requests remanded the case to the overseers of the London Huguenot church, which awarded Bellott 20 nobles (or £6 13s. 4d.). A year later, though, Mountjoy still had not paid.

== Marie Mountjoy and masque costume ==
Charles Nicholl and others have identified Marie Mountjoy with the Mary Mountjoy,^{1} born circa 1568, who was a client of the astrologer Simon Forman in 1597 (for example, after losing a ring).

The Mountjoys and Shakespeare may have met in the world of theatrical costuming. At the beginning of 1604, the year of her daughter's marriage, Mrs Mountjoy is known to have been working at court, where she provided a headpiece and trimmings for the queen, Anne of Denmark. The queen was taking the role of Pallas Athena in Samuel Daniel's masque The Vision of the Twelve Goddesses.

The bill reads; "Marie Mountioye Tyrewoman for an helmett for her majestie and divers trymmings for her ladies in her maiesties maske at Twelftide 1603 as by her bill vouched by the La: Walsingham ... lix li [£59].

Mrs Mountjoy died in 1606.

== Notes ==
1. Scholars have tended to use Marie for the mother and Mary for the daughter to better distinguish them.
