= United States Geological Survey Library =

US Geological Survey program

- Seal

- Official identifier

Agency overview
- Formed: March 3, 1879
- Headquarters: Reston, Virginia
- Agency executive: Ned Mamula, Director
- Parent agency: Department of the Interior
- Website: library.usgs.gov

The United States Geological Survey Library (USGS Library) is a program within the United States Geological Survey (USGS), a scientific bureau within the Department of Interior of the United States government. The USGS operates as a fact-finding research organization with limited regulatory responsibility.

The USGS Library is open to the public for in-person research at locations in Reston, Virginia and Lakewood, Colorado.

== Description ==
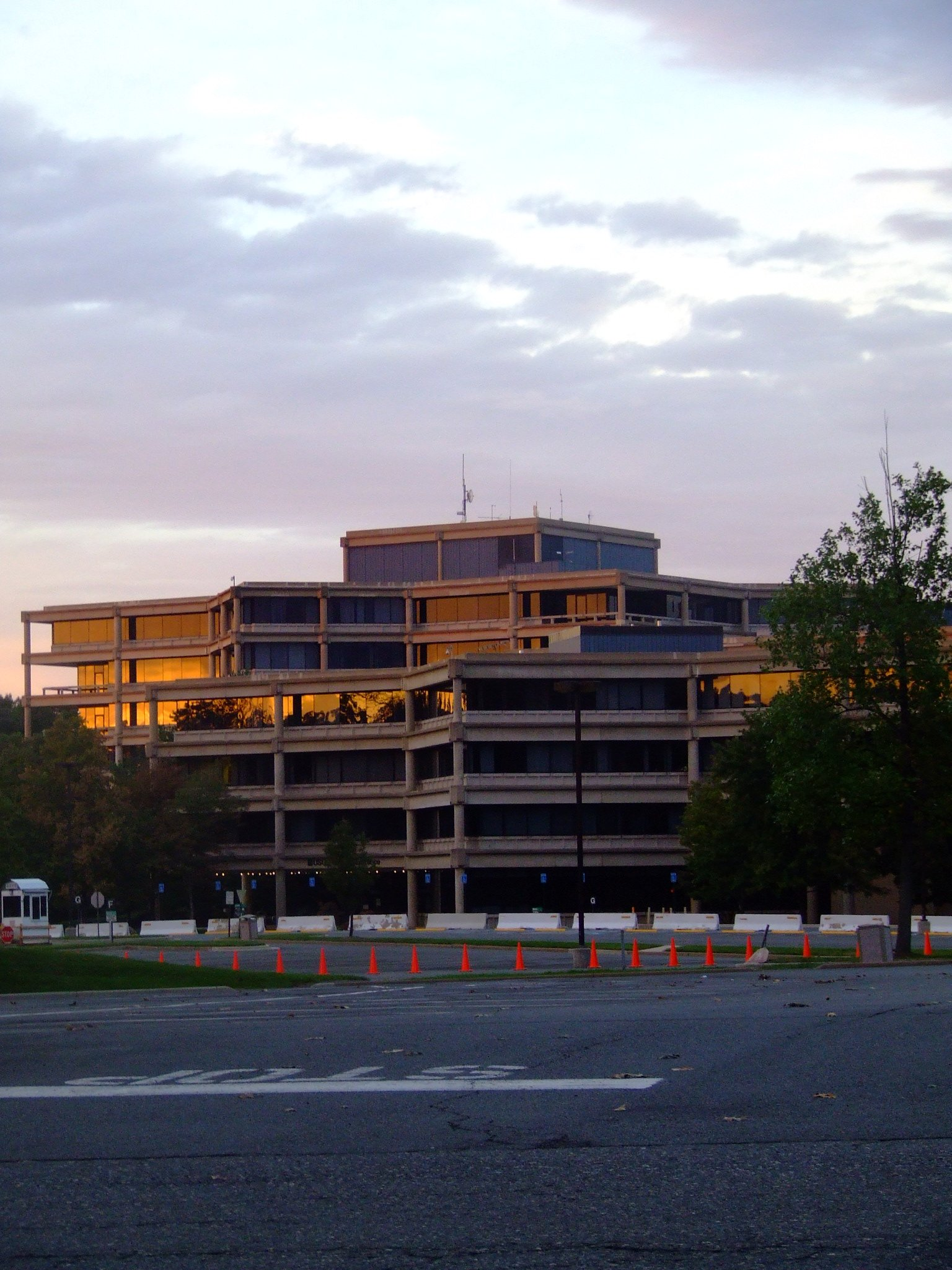
The USGS headquarters in Reston, VA

Today, the United States Geological Survey Library's users have access to over 1.7 million items: over 980,000 books and journals, over 600,000 maps, over 8,000 electronic media items (DVDs, CDs), and subscribes to over 113,000 electronic journal titles and eBooks. Materials include USGS publications, as well as those produced by state and foreign geological surveys, scientific societies, museums, academic institutions, and government scientific agencies. The library in Reston participates in the Federal Depository Library Program, providing public access to selected U.S. Government publications, including print versions of older publications not available online.

== History ==
Congress authorized a library for the United States Geological Survey (USGS) in 1879. The library was formally established in 1882, with the naming of the first librarian, Charles C. Darwin, and began with a staff of 3 and a collection of 1,400 books. The Act of Congress establishing the USGS (20 Stat. L., 394-395, 3 March 1879) authorized the creation of a program for exchanging copies of USGS reports for publications of state, national, and international organizations. The exchange program was modeled after a program used by Dr. Ferdinand V. Hayden when he was head of the Interior Department's U.S. Geological and Geographical Survey of the Territories (1867–1879). The U.S. Geological Survey Library inherited 1,000 volumes of serials from Dr. Hayden's former exchange program, which he had based on the program begun by the Smithsonian Institution in 1846. After Dr. Hayden died in 1887, his widow donated his personal collection to the USGS Library. Other early gifts were made by Major John Wesley Powell, second Director of the USGS, who donated his collection of State Geological Survey reports and the family of Dr. Isaac Lea (Philadelphia publisher and gem collector whose family donated nearly 600 items of his personal library). Dr. William Halliday, a world-renowned speleologist, began donating his cave collection in 2003.

In a review of USGS Library operations in 1937, William Heers, the Chief Librarian, noted the library had more than 200,000 books and reports, about 60,000 pamphlets, and about 60,000 maps, most of these obtained by gift and exchange. Fully half of those researchers who used the library were outside of the USGS. In service to those outside the government, between 8,000–10,000 books were loaned out each year through interlibrary loans, both within the continental US and overseas.

In a review of the USGS Library during its centennial, it was noted in 1978 the library had acquired nearly 116,000 new items. About 75% of these were journals, of which 10,000 serial, magazine, and other periodical titles were received. In 1978, the library circulated 105,000 items, made 17,700 interlibrary loans, and answered some 27,000 requests for information.

In March 2012, the USGS Library joined the Biodiversity Heritage Library with the goal of contributing important historical works related to taxonomy, as well as relevant USGS publications.

The U.S. Geological Survey Library has become one of the largest geoscience libraries in the world. Materials within the library system include books and maps dating back to the 16th and 17th centuries, as well as a nearly complete set of the various State Geological Survey publications.

== U.S. Geological Survey Library Classification System ==
The classification system is designed for use in the USGS Library and other earth science libraries. Prior to the administration of Fred Boughton Weeks, 1903–1908, the library lacked a classification scheme. The Dewey Decimal system for geologic material was not sufficiently developed to accommodate the range of specialized material collected at the USGS Library, and the full Library of Congress Classification System schedules had not yet been published. Library staff and patrons were concerned about continued development of the collection without an acceptable classification scheme. Mr. Weeks and bibliographer John M. Nickles of the library staff, with the assistance of three consultants from the New York Public Library, developed the USGS classification system designed specifically for an earth science library. It is a tool for assigning call numbers to earth science and allied pure science materials to collect these materials into related subject groups on library shelves and arrange them alphabetically by author and title. This classification can be used as a retrieval system to access materials through the subject and geographic numbers. It has been developed over the years since 1904 to meet the ever-changing needs of increased specialization and the development of new areas of research in the geosciences, such as remote sensing and planetary geology.

== Special Library Collections ==
=== Field Records Collection ===
The Field Records Collection is an archive of field notes, maps, sample analysis reports, correspondence, manuscripts, and other data created or collected by more than 1500 USGS scientists during geologic field investigations and other project work. The majority of the collection dates from 1879 and relates to work done in the contiguous United States and Hawaii. Field records and project archives for Alaska are kept in the Alaska Technical Data Unit Field Records Archive in Anchorage, AK.

=== Rare Books and Maps ===
The Rare Book Collection of the USGS Library comprises unusual publications, rare books, and maps collected since 1879. Included are historical maps and publications of USGS, as well as early publications of many federal, state and other geological surveys. Records of select geological societies are also maintained in the collection, such as the Geological Society of Washington, which was founded by John Wesley Powell and other noted scientists after the Civil War. Of special note are many 19th century maps with topics such as American political boundaries, transportation, geology, and mining.

=== Kunz Collection ===
Acquired by the library in 1933, the George F. Kunz Collection documents the history and study of gems and minerals. It including rare books on gemology, historical accounts of gemstone folklore, works on lapidary arts, and archival gem trade records that contribute to the provenance of named stones such as the Hope Diamond. Kunz, a former USGS employee and vice-president of Tiffany & Co., was a prominent gem expert whose professional work helped shape the field.

=== Map Collection ===
The USGS Library’s map collection contains a broad collection of maps covering the United States, foreign areas, and planetary bodies. The collection includes topographic maps, geologic maps, and thematic maps concentrating on the geosciences. The collection consists primarily of flat paper sheet maps; other formats include Braille, raised relief maps, microfiche, microfilm, DVDs, CDs, and flat sheet maps in other materials.

=== Topographic Map Archive ===
Responsibility for the Topographic Map Archive was formally transferred to the USGS Library in March 2003. The Archive includes each U.S. state and territory, in all scales, editions and various printings. With coverage dating from the 1880s when the USGS began publishing standard topographic quadrangles, the Archive is the most complete collection of USGS topographic maps.

=== United States Antarctic Resource Collection ===
The U.S. Antarctic Resource Collection (USARC) is currently located at the USGS Library in Reston, VA, and contains materials from the former U.S. Antarctic Resource Center. When operational, the Center was a joint effort of the USGS National Mapping Division and the National Science Foundation United States Antarctic Program. The Center maintained the nation's most comprehensive collection of Antarctic aerial photography, maps, charts, satellite imagery, and technical reports. The current collection includes materials produced by the following Antarctic Treaty nations: Argentina, Australia, Belgium, Brazil, Chile, China, Ecuador, Finland, France, Germany, India, Italy, Japan, the Republic of Korea, the Netherlands, New Zealand, Norway, Peru, Poland, the Russian Federation, South Africa, Spain, Sweden, the United Kingdom, the United States, and Uruguay.

=== USGS Photographic Collection ===
The USGS Library Photographic Collection is an archive of more than 500,000 still photographs, color transparencies, negatives, glass plate negatives, lantern slides and sketches taken during geologic studies of the United States and its territories from 1868 to present. Subjects include earthquakes, volcanoes, landslides, topography, historical mining operations, earth science, and a substantial collection of USGS personnel portraits. The works of pioneer photographers such as William Henry Jackson, Timothy H. O'Sullivan, Carleton Watkins, John Karl Hillers, Thomas Moran, Andrew J. Russell, E. O. Beaman and William Bell (photographer) are represented in the collection. Some photographs have been used to illustrate publications, but most have never been published. Currently, the USGS Library Photographic Collection website provides online access to less than ten percent of the entire archive.

== List of USGS Library Chief Librarians ==
- 1882–1902 Charles C. Darwin, first Chief Librarian
- 1903–1908 Fred B. Weeks, second Chief Librarian
- 1908–1929 Julia L. V. McCord, third Chief Librarian
- 1929–1940 Guy E. Mitchell, fourth Chief Librarian
- 1940–1969 William H. Heers, fifth Chief Librarian
- 1969–1985 George H. Goodwin, Jr., sixth Chief Librarian
- 1985–1988 Elizabeth J. Yeates, seventh Chief Librarian
- 1988–1993 Barbara A. Chappell, eighth Chief Librarian
- 1995–1999 Edward H. Liszewski, ninth Chief Librarian
- 2000–2005 Nancy L. Blair, tenth Chief Librarian
- 2008–2013 Richard Huffine, eleventh Chief Librarian
- 2014–2020 Catharine Canevari, twelfth Chief Librarian
- 2026–Present Rob Thieler
