= William K. Bixby =

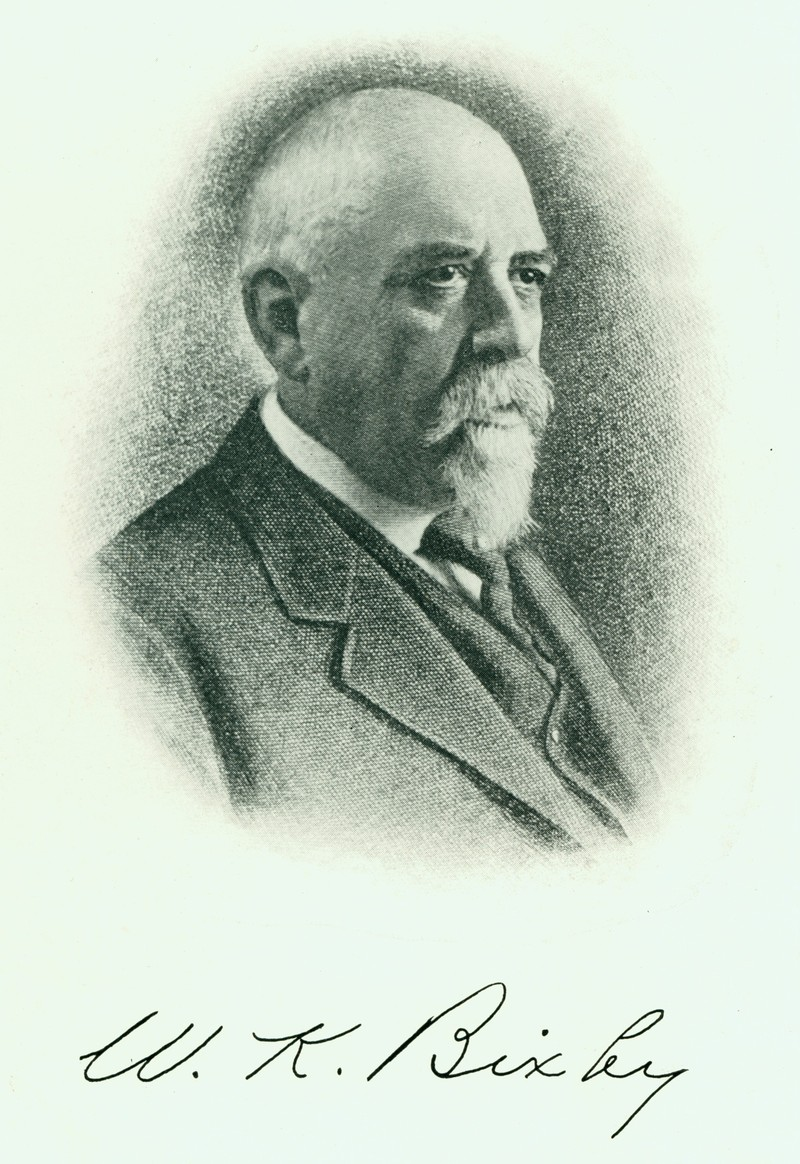
Portrait of William K. Bixby

William K. Bixby (January 2, 1857 – October 29, 1931) was a collector of art and rare books, and is known for his significant philanthropic contributions around the St. Louis area.

== Life ==
William Keeney Bixby was born on January 2, 1857, in Adrian, Michigan. After his high school graduation from Adrian High School, Bixby moved to Texas to work as a baggage handler and night watchman on the International & Great North Pacific Railroad. In 1881, Bixby married Lillian Tuttle, and the two had six children. As he worked through the ranks of the Texas railroad, his vigor caught the eye of H.M. Hoxie, the president of the Missouri Pacific Railroad. Hoxie soon convinced Bixby to move to St. Louis to work for the Union Pacific, and in 1889, Bixby spearheaded the merger of eighteen companies that led to the creation of the American Car & Foundry Company. He served as president and as a member of the Board until his retirement in 1905, at age 48. One year prior to his retirement, he and his wife Lillian purchased a mansion in the Central West End, which is now the site of the Chase Park Plaza. Bixby's retirement at such a young age provided him with ample opportunities to pursue his passions in travel and literature. He was an ardent collector of autographs, manuscripts, rare books, and art.

== Later career ==
After his time working at the Missouri Union and later at the American Car & Foundry Company, Bixby dedicated his time to numerous groups and activities in the St. Louis area. In the year preceding his retirement, he headed the Fine Arts Commission for the 1904 World's Fair, an act that helped inspire the creation of the St. Louis Art Museum. He was elected a member of the American Antiquarian Society in 1906. After his retirement from the railroad industry, he served as president for the Missouri Historical Society twice: from 1907 to 1913 and 1925 to 1930. He also served on the board of Washington University in St. Louis, where he worked with Robert S. Brookings to rebuild the medical school and helped create the Bixby Chair of Surgery. He briefly served as the president of Laclede Gas and as a director of numerous banks around St. Louis.

== Legacy ==
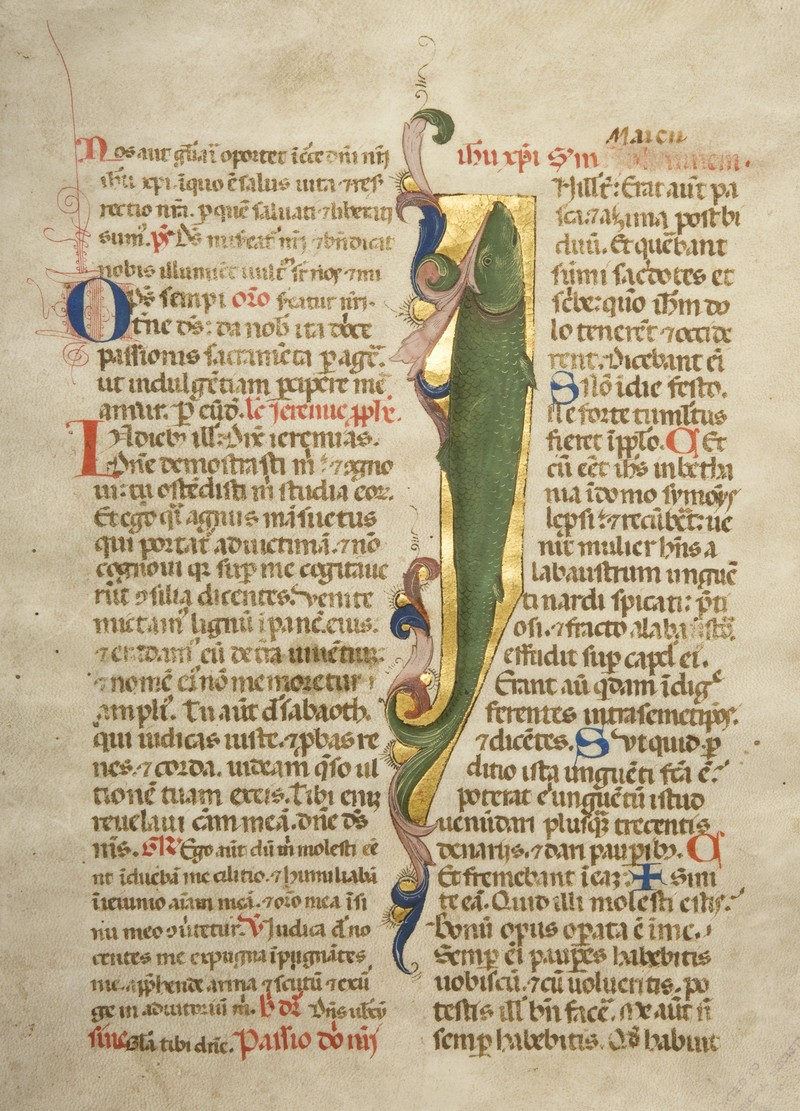
Illuminated Manuscript, Florence, Italy

William Bixby's name can be found in countless places throughout St. Louis. Most notably, Washington University in St. Louis named Bixby Hall after him, which was built in 1926 to house the Washington University School of Fine Arts. The main restaurant in the Missouri History Museum, "Bixby's", was also named after him, which closed in December 2017. His name also appears alongside a myriad of donated works.

Bixby was passionate not only about art and rare books but was also passionate about sharing his love for these hobbies. He donated items such as The Nuremberg Chronicle, 1493, papers of Thomas Jefferson, and an illuminated Medieval Missal leaf to the Missouri Historical Society. He also donated parts of his collections to the St. Louis Art Museum, Washington University in St. Louis, the St. Louis Mercantile Library, and the St. Louis Artist's Guild, among others.
