= Eminent Lives =

The Eminent Lives series is HarperCollins' series of "brief biographies by distinguished authors on canonical figures." The general editor of the series was James Atlas.

The series includes books by:

- Robert Gottlieb on George Balanchine
- Paul Johnson on George Washington
- Christopher Hitchens on Thomas Jefferson
- Michael Korda on Ulysses S. Grant
- Francine Prose on Caravaggio
- Edmund Morris on Ludwig van Beethoven
- Joseph Epstein on Alexis de Tocqueville
- Peter Kramer on Sigmund Freud
- Karen Armstrong on Muhammad
- Bill Bryson on William Shakespeare
- Matt Ridley on Francis Crick
- Ross King on Niccolò Machiavelli.
