= Charles William Wallace =

American literary critic (1865–1932)

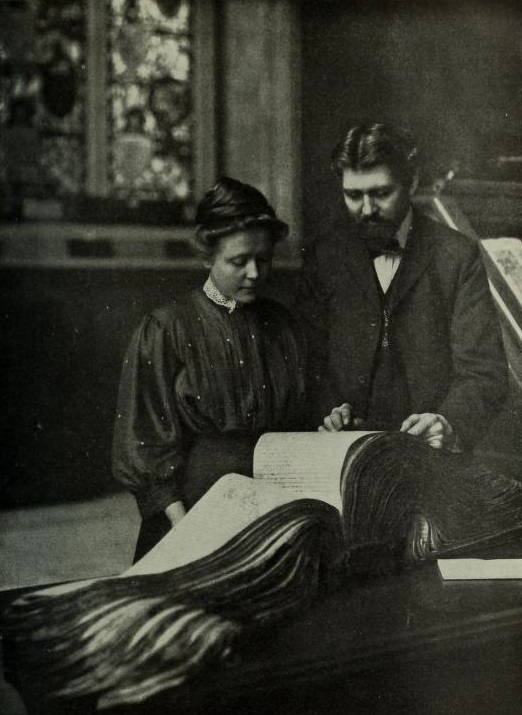
Professor Charles William Wallace and his wife, Hulda.

Charles William Wallace (February 6, 1865 – August 7, 1932) was an American scholar and researcher, famed for his discoveries in the field of English Renaissance theatre.

Wallace was born in Hopkins, Missouri to Thomas Dickay Wallace and Olive McEwen. Intending to be a teacher, he graduated from Western Normal College, Shenandoah, Iowa, and taught briefly in country schoolhouses before becoming a professor of Latin and English at his alma mater. He also founded and directed a preparatory school for the state university in Nebraska. He earned a bachelor's degree from the University of Nebraska, and a doctorate from the University of Freiburg in Breisgau. He was an instructor at the University of Nebraska in 1901, and appointed professor of English Dramatic Literature at that institution in 1910. He married Hulda Alfreda Berggren in 1893.

From 1907 through 1916, he and his wife conducted an intensive survey at the Public Record Office in London. The Wallaces discovered the court record papers of the dispute between Alleyn and the owners of The Theatre, an account of which he published as The First London Theatre: Materials for a History. They also discovered Shakespeare's 1612 deposition in the Bellott v. Mountjoy lawsuit, and records of the suits Keysar v. Burbage (1610), Ostler v. Heminges (1615), and Witter v. Heminges and Condell (1619), among a range of other documents, yielding important new knowledge in the study of Jacobean drama. The Wallaces' work provided a vastly improved comprehension of the role of the children's companies in English Renaissance drama.

Wallace's dedication to his research took an unusual, perhaps unique form: in order to finance further work, he became a wildcatter in the oil industry in 1918. He made successful discoveries in that arena too, and planned to use his new wealth to publish a lavish collection of original records in Elizabethan and Jacobean studies; but his death from cancer in 1932 prevented the realization of his plan.

Wallace's most important publications are his books, The Children of the Chapel at Blackfriars, 1597–1603 (1908), The Evolution of the English Drama Up to Shakespeare (1912), and The First London Theatre: Materials for a History (1913).
