= Thomas Moore (disambiguation) =

Thomas Moore (1779–1852) was an Irish poet, songwriter, singer, novelist, and historian.

Thomas, Tom, Tomm, or Tommy Moore may also refer to:

== Arts and entertainment ==
=== Performing arts and film ===
- Tom Moore (actor) (1883–1955), Irish-American silent film actor and director
- Ennio Girolami (1935–2013), Italian actor, sometimes credited as Thomas Moore
- Tom Moore (director) (born 1943), American director of 'night, Mother and multiple television shows
- Thomas Michael Moore (born 1949), American actor professionally known as Tom Berenger
- Tomm Moore (born 1977), Irish filmmaker, animator, and cartoonist

=== Others in arts and entertainment ===
- Thomas W. Moore (1918–2007), American television executive at ABC
- Tom Moore (artist) (born 1971), Australian glass artist
- Tom Moore (cartoonist) (1928–2015), American cartoonist, best known for the "Archie" comic books series
- Tommy Moore (comedian) (born 1950), American comedian, clown, and motivational speaker
- Tommy Moore (musician) (1931–1981), English drummer for The Silver Beetles (later The Beatles) in 1960

== Politics ==
- Sir Thomas de la Moore or More (died after 1347), English knight and member of parliament
- Thomas Moore (Roundhead) (1618–1695), English politician who sat in the House of Commons variously between 1640 and 1660
- Thomas Moore (South Carolina congressman) (1759–1822), American politician, representative from South Carolina 1799–1801
- Thomas Channing Moore (1872–1931), American businessman and politician from New York
- Thomas Edward Laws Moore (1816–1872), Royal Navy officer, explorer and governor of the Falkland Islands
- Thomas Fitzgibbon Moore, constable and politician in Newfoundland in the early 19th century
- Thomas Love Moore (died 1862), early 19th century American congressman
- Thomas P. Moore (1797–1853), U.S. representative from Kentucky
- Thomas Overton Moore (1804–1876), U.S. and subsequently Confederate governor of Louisiana
- Tom Moore (trade unionist) (1878–1943), Canadian carpenter and trade unionist from Ontario
- Thomas Moore (Australian politician) (1881–1961), Australian politician
- Sir Thomas Moore, 1st Baronet (1886–1971), British Conservative member of parliament for Ayr 1925–1964
- Tom Moore Jr. (1918–2017), American politician, Democratic member of the Texas House of Representatives 1967–1973
- Tommy Moore (politician) (born 1950), South Carolina businessman and former state politician
- Tom Moore (politician) (born 1952), American politician in the Iowa House of Representatives

== Sports ==
=== Baseball and cricket ===
- Thomas Moore (New Zealand cricketer) (1844–1935), New Zealand cricketer
- Tommy Moore (baseball) (1948–2017), American Major League Baseball pitcher
- Thomas Moore (English cricketer) (born 1992), English cricketer

=== Football (Association and American) ===
- Thomas Moore (footballer) (1864–?), Scottish footballer Arbroath, Stoke
- Thomas Patrick Moore (footballer) (1872–1934), Argentine footballer
- Tommy Moore (footballer) (1877–?), English goalkeeper, Millwall, West Ham
- Tom Moore (footballer) (born 1936), English goalkeeper, Darlington
- Tom Moore (running back) (born 1938), American former NFL running back
- Tom Moore (American football coach, born 1938), American National Football League coach
- Tom Moore (American football coach, born 1945) (1945–2026), American college football coach

=== Other sports ===
- Tommy Moore (hurler) (1890–1973), Irish hurler
- Tom Moore (track) (1914–2002), American track athlete and meet director of the Modesto Relays
- Thomas "Tommy" Moore, English professional wrestler, billed as Jack Dempsey (1920–2007)
- Tommy Moore (golfer) (1962–1998), American professional golfer
- Tom Moore (basketball) (born 1965), American basketball coach at Quinnipiac University

== Writers ==
- Thomas Sturge Moore (1870–1944), English poet, author and artist
- Thomas Moore (spiritual writer) (born 1940), American author
- T. Inglis Moore (Tom Inglis Moore; 1901–1978), Australian writer, anthologist and academic

== Other people ==
- Thomas Moore (British Army officer, died 1735) (c. 1669–1735), British Army Paymaster of the Forces Abroad
- Thomas Moore (architect) (1908–1970), American architect
- Thomas Moore (Australian settler) (1762–1840), early settler to Australia, co-founder of Moore Theological College
- Thomas Verner Moore (church minister) (1818–1871), American Reformed theologian and Presbyterian minister
- Thomas Moore (botanist) (1821–1887), British botanist
- Thomas E. Moore (1839–1898), national commander of the Salvation Army in the United States
- T. B. Moore (Thomas Bather Moore, 1850–1919), Australian pioneer of Tasmania
- Thomas Verner Moore (1877–1969), American psychologist, psychiatrist and monk
- Captain Tom Moore (1920–2021), British soldier and NHS COVID-19 fundraiser
- Thomas Moore (priest) (born 1938), Irish priest, Dean of Clogher, 1995–2004
- Thomas Moore (admiral) (born 1959), United States Navy officer
- Thomas Hill Moore (1937–2022), commissioner of the U.S. Consumer Product Safety Commission
- Thomas A. Moore (fl. 1980s–2010s), American theoretical astrophysicist
- Thomas K. Moore (born 1938), judge of the District Court of the Virgin Islands

== See also ==
- Thomas More (disambiguation)
