= Thomas More (disambiguation) =

Thomas More (1478–1535) was a saint, martyr and author; Lord Chancellor of England during the reign of Henry VIII.

Thomas More may also refer to:

== People ==
- Thomas More (died 1421), MP for Gloucester
- Thomas More (died 1461), MP for Cumberland
- Thomas More (Died 1556), a servant and Protestant martyr who died at Leicester
- Thomas More (died 1606) (1531–1606), English politician
- Thomas More (weaver), 17th-century lay theologian

== Entertainment ==
- Thomas More (The Tudors), a character from the television series
- Sir Thomas More (play), an Elizabethan play

== Art ==
- Portrait of Sir Thomas More (Holbein), 1527 painting by Hans Holbein the Younger
- Thomas More, Lord High Chancellor of England, 1828 painting by Claudius Jacquand

== See also ==
- Thomas Moore (disambiguation)
