= Shakespeare's handwriting =

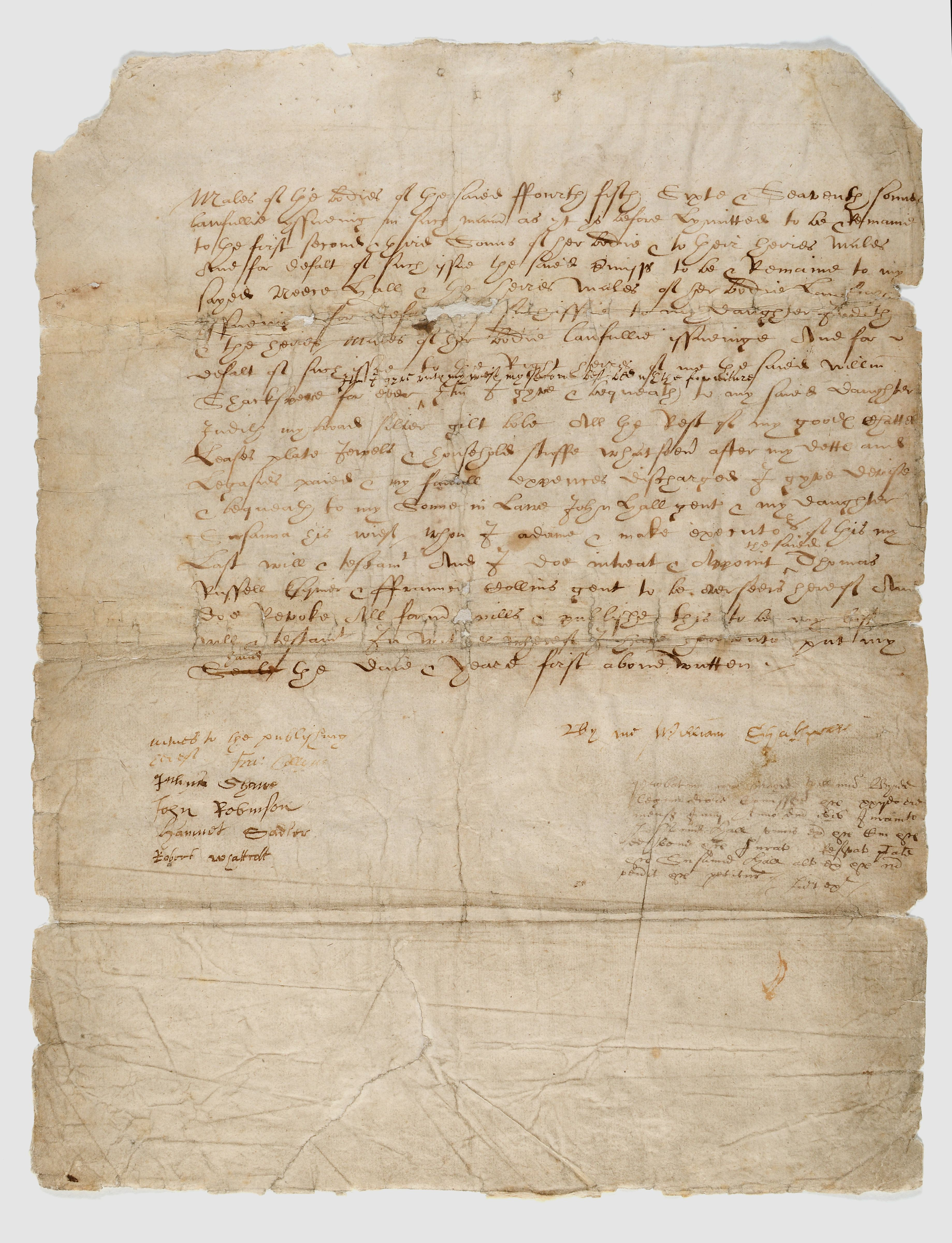
William Shakespeare's will, written in a style of handwriting known as the secretary hand.

William Shakespeare's handwriting is known from six surviving signatures, all of which appear on legal documents. It is believed by many scholars that three pages of the handwritten manuscript of the play Sir Thomas More are also in William Shakespeare's handwriting. This is based on scholarly studies that considered handwriting, spelling, vocabulary, literary aspects, and other factors.

== Description ==
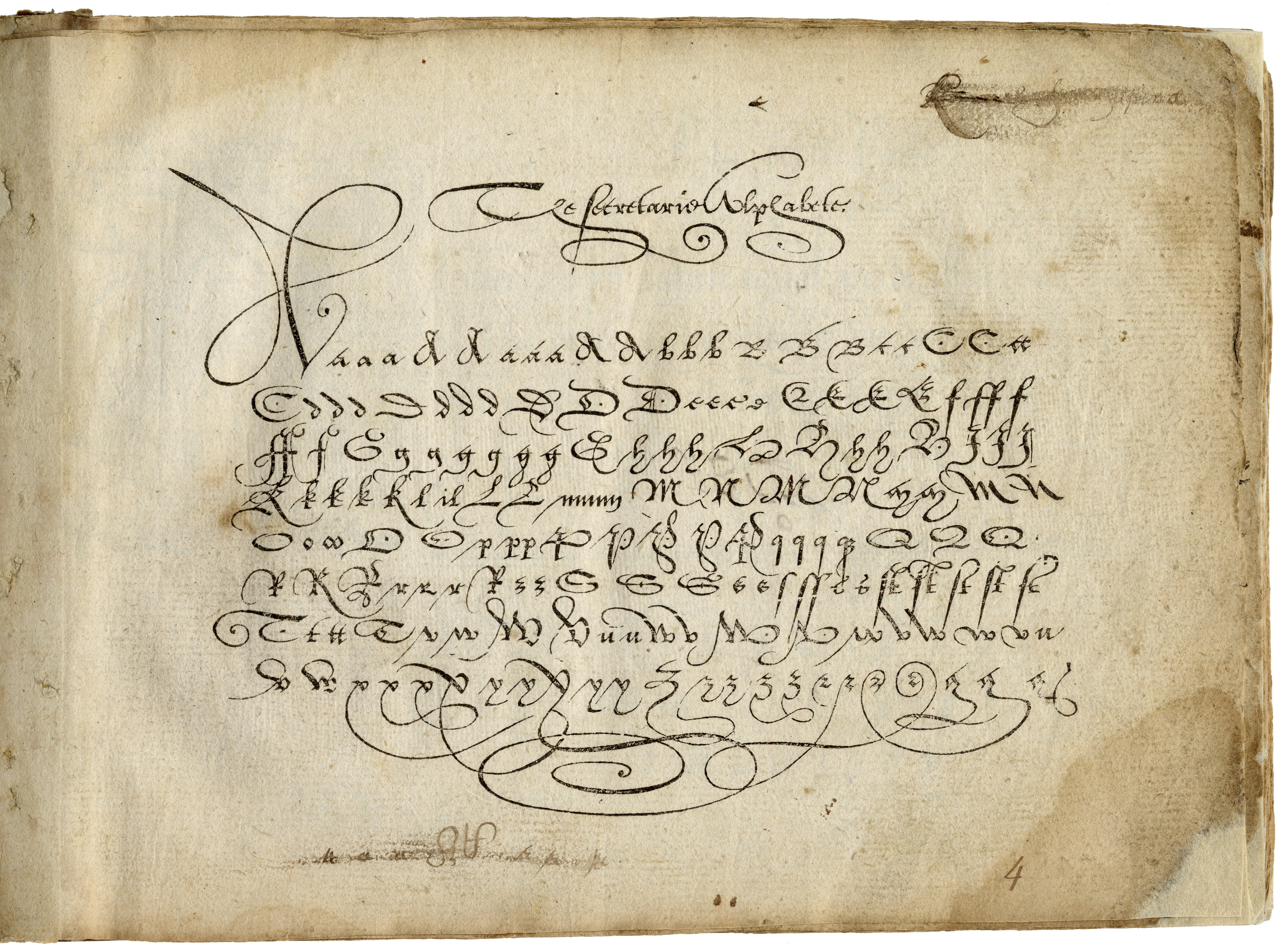
This secretary alphabet is in a penmanship book by Jehan de Beau-Chesne and John Baildon published in 1570, when Shakespeare would have been five or six years old. This may have been the edition he studied as a child in grammar school.

Shakespeare's six extant signatures were written in the style known as secretary hand. It was native and common in England at the time, and was the cursive style taught in schools. It is distinct from italic script, which was encroaching as an alternate form (and which is more familiar to readers of today).

The secretary hand was popular with authors of Shakespeare's time, including Christopher Marlowe and Francis Bacon. It could be written with ease and swiftness and was conducive to the use of abbreviations. As it was taught in the schools and by tutors, it allowed for great diversity—each writer could choose a style for each letter. Secretary hand can be difficult to decipher for current day readers.

Shakespeare wrote with a quill in his right hand. A quill would need to be prepared and sharpened. Black ink would be derived from "oak apples" (small lumps in oak trees caused by insects), with iron sulfate and gum arabic added.

John Heminges and Henry Condell, who edited the First Folio in 1623, wrote that Shakespeare's "mind and hand went together, and what he thought he uttered with that easiness that we have scarce received from him a blot in his papers." In his posthumously published essay, Timber: Or, Discoveries, Ben Jonson wrote:

I remember the players have often mentioned it as an honor to Shakespeare, that in his writing, whatsoever he penned, he never blotted out a line. My answer hath been, 'Would he hath blotted a thousand,' which they thought a malevolent speech. I had not told posterity this but for their ignorance, who chose that circumstance to commend their friend by wherein he most faulted; and to justify mine own candor, for I loved the man, and do honor his memory on this side idolatry as much as any. He was, indeed, honest, and of an open and free nature; had an excellent fancy, brave notions, and gentle expressions, wherein he flowed with that facility that sometime it was necessary he should be stopped.

The three-page addition to Sir Thomas More, which is attributed by some to Shakespeare, is written in a fluid manner by a skillful and experienced writer. The writing begins with indications of speed, in the manner of a scrivener, with a practiced sense of uniformity. Then the writing style changes over to a more deliberate and heavier style, as can be seen, for example, in the speeches of Thomas More, which require greater thought and choice of words. Throughout, the writing shows a disposition to play with the pen, to exaggerate certain curves, to use heavier downstrokes, and to finish some final letters with a small flourish. These characteristics are more evident in the slower, deliberate sections. Therefore, the handwriting shows a freedom to make variances in style depending on the mood or the composition being written.

== Paleography ==
Serious study of Shakespeare's handwriting began in the 18th century with scholars Edmond Malone and George Steevens. By the late nineteenth century paleographers began to make detailed study of the evidence in the hope of identifying Shakespeare's handwriting in other surviving documents. In those cases when the actual handwriting is not extant, the study of the published texts has yielded indirect evidence of his handwriting quirks through readings and apparent misreadings by compositors. To give one example of this, in the early published versions of Shakespeare's plays there is a recurrence of an upper case letter "C" when the lower case is called for. This might indicate that Shakespeare was fond of such a usage in his handwriting, and that the compositors (working from the handwriting) followed the usage. When trying to determine who the author is of either a printed work or a pen-and-ink manuscript, this is one possible method of discovering such indications.

== Signatures ==
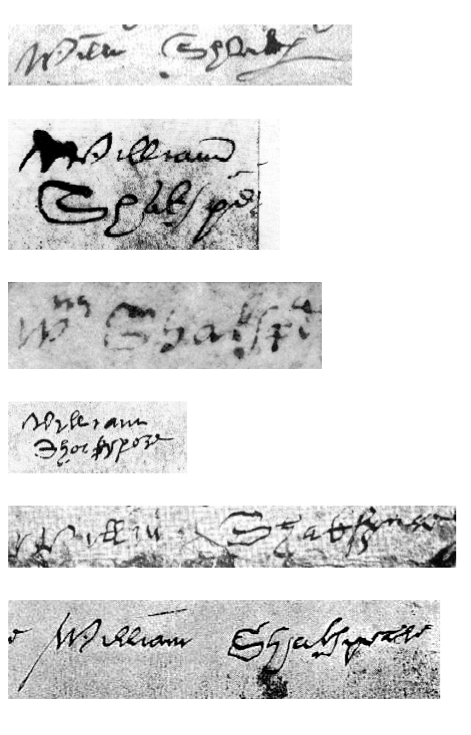
Shakespeare's six surviving signatures are all from legal documents.

There are six surviving signatures, attached to four legal documents, that are generally recognised as authentic:

- a deposition in the Bellott v Mountjoy case, dated 11 May 1612
- the purchase of a house in Blackfriars, London, dated 10 March 1613
- the mortgage of the same house, dated 11 March 1613
- his Last Will and Testament, which contains three signatures, one on each page, dated 25 March 1616

The signatures appear as follows:

- Willm Shakp
- William Shakspēr
- W^{m} Shakspē
- William Shakspere
- Willm Shakspere
- By me William Shakspeare

The first signature includes a short horizontal stroke above the letter "m" and a horizontal stroke or flourish in the stem of the letter "p", which may be read as "per" or, less likely, as an indication of abbreviation. The fifth signature also contains a horizontal stroke above the letter "m". All of his signatures are written in his native English script, which he would have learned as a young boy in school. He used the long Italian cursive letter "s" in the center of his surname, a concession to the new style, except for the fifth signature, in which he reverts to the native English long "s".

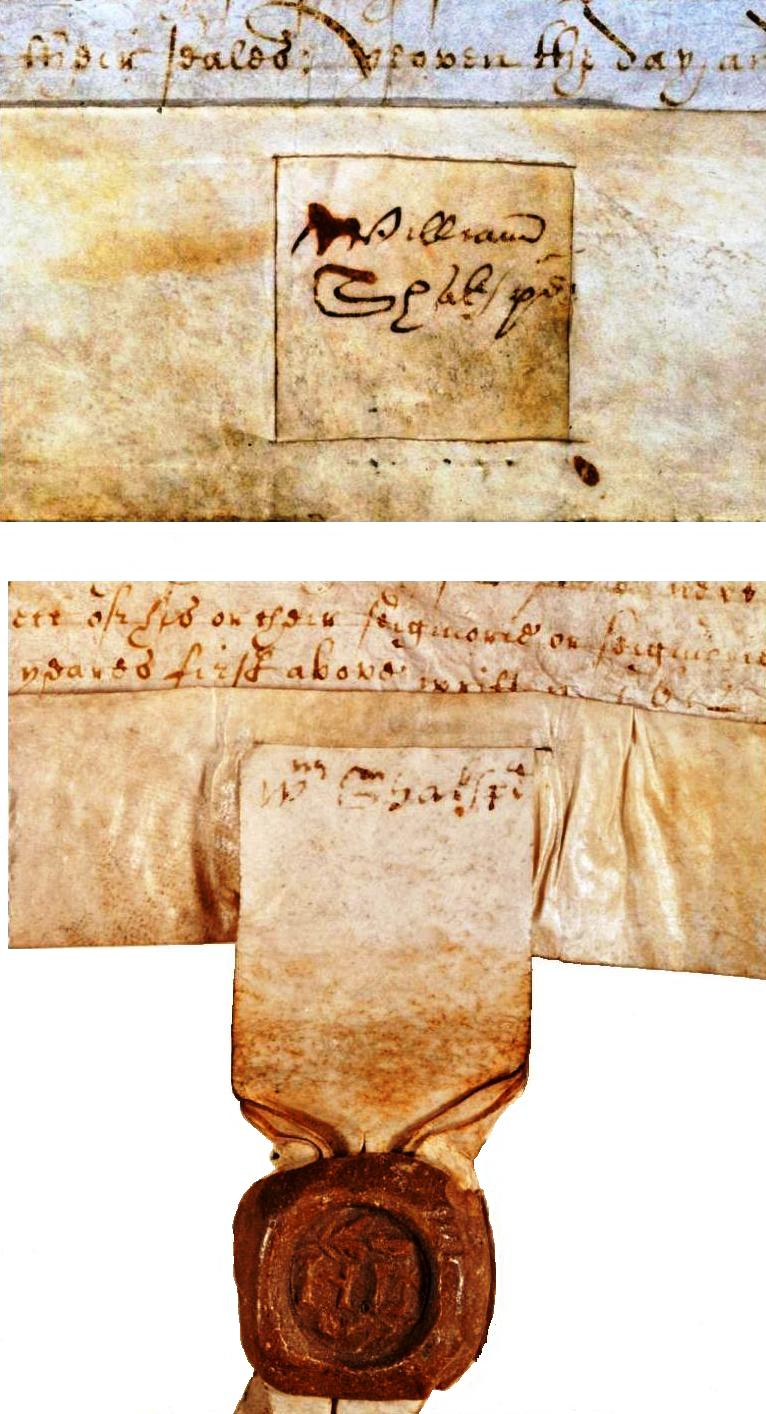
The Blackfriars signatures are fitted into the narrow space of the seal holder

Three of these signatures are abbreviated versions of the surname, using breviographic conventions of the time, which was common practice. For example, Edmund Spenser sometimes wrote his name out in full (spelling his first name Edmund or Edmond), but often used the abbreviated forms "Ed: spser" or "Edm: spser". The signatures on the Blackfriars document may have been abbreviated because they had to be squeezed into the small space provided by the seal-tag, which they were legally authenticating.

The three signatures on the will were first reproduced by the 18th-century scholar George Steevens, who copied them as accurately as he could by hand and then had his drawings engraved. The facsimiles were first printed in the 1778 edition of Shakespeare's plays, edited by Steevens and Samuel Johnson. The publication of the signatures led to a controversy about the proper spelling of Shakespeare's name. The paleographer Edward Maunde Thompson later criticised the Steevens transcriptions, arguing that his original drawings were inaccurate.

The two signatures relating to the house sale were identified in 1768 and acquired by David Garrick, who presented them to Steevens' colleague Edmond Malone. By the later nineteenth century the signatures had been photographed. Photographs of these five signatures were published by Sidney Lee.

The final signature, on the Bellott v Mountjoy deposition, was discovered by 1909 by Charles William Wallace. It was first published by him in the March 1910 issue of Harper's Magazine and reprinted in the October 1910 issue of Nebraska University Studies.

== Handwriting analysis ==
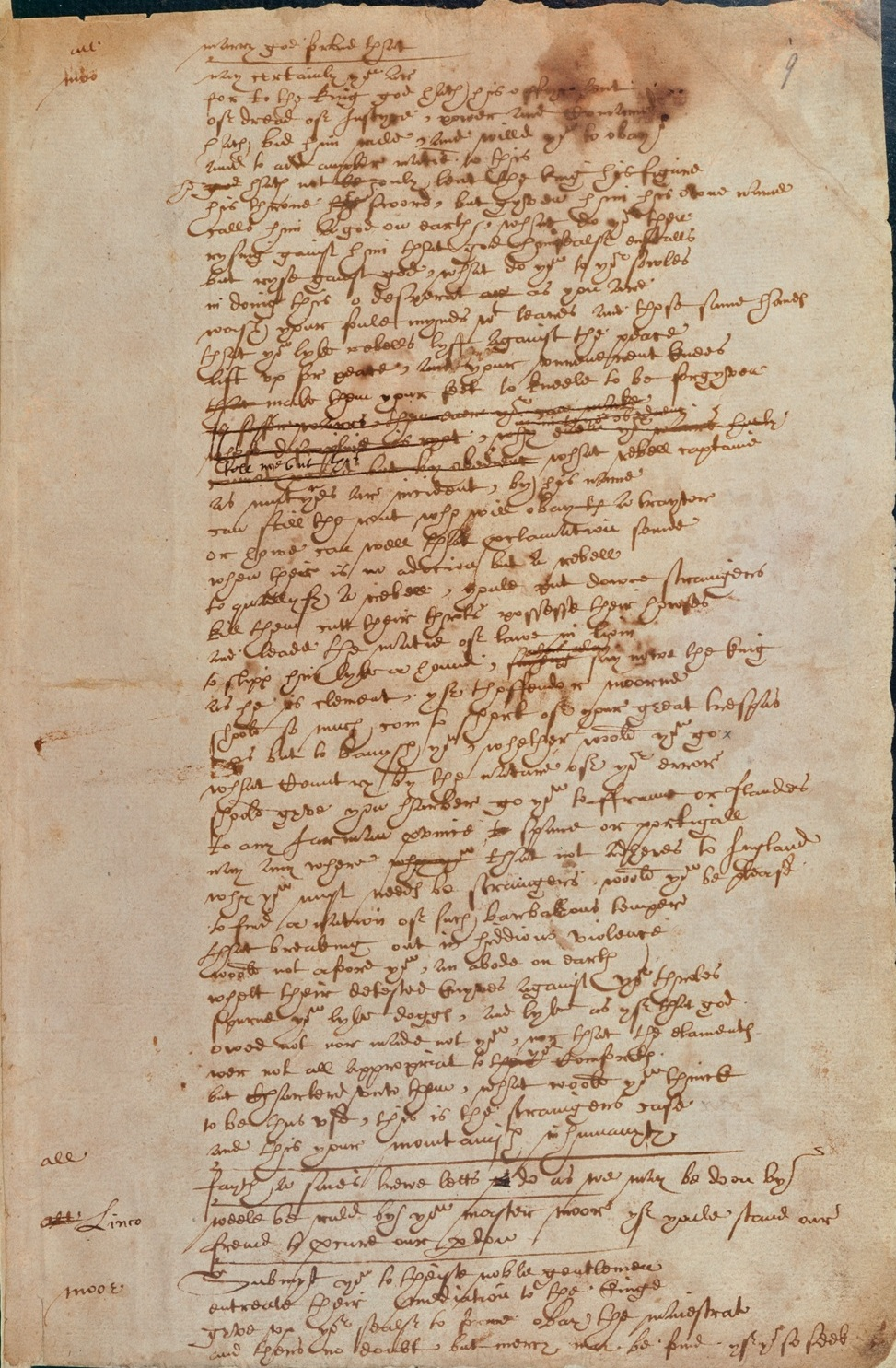
Facsimile of a page written by 'Hand D', in all likelihood written by William Shakespeare

Although some scholars took note of, and reproduced, Shakespeare's handwriting as early as the 18th century, the paleographer Sir Edward Maunde Thompson wrote in 1916 that the subject of Shakespeare's handwriting had "never been subjected to a thorough and systematic study." One reason for this neglect is that the only examples of Shakespeare's handwriting that were known to earlier scholars were five authentic signatures. A further difficulty was that three of the known signatures were written in the last weeks of Shakespeare's life, when he may have been suffering from a tremor or otherwise enfeebled by illness, and the other two had been written under conditions that restrained free movement of the hand. Those signed to the Blackfriars mortgage had to be squeezed into the narrow space of the seal.

Under the circumstances, with evidence limited to those five signatures, an attempt to reconstitute the handwriting that Shakespeare actually used might have been considered impossible. But then in 1910, the discovery of the sixth signature on the Bellott v Mountjoy deposition changed all this. This signature was written with a free hand, and it was the key to an important part of the problem. Thompson identified distinctive characteristics in Shakespeare's hand, which include delicate introductory upstrokes of the pen, the use of the Italian long "s" in the middle of his surname in his signatures, an unusual form of the letter "k", and a number of other personal variations.

The first time it was suggested that the three-page addition to the play Sir Thomas More was composed and also written out by William Shakespeare was in a correspondence to the publication Notes and Queries in July 1871 by Richard Simpson, who was not an expert in handwriting. Simpson's note was titled: "Are there any extant MSS in Shakespeare's handwriting?" His idea received little serious attention for a few decades. After more than a year James Spedding wrote to the same publication in support of that particular suggestion by Simpson, saying that the handwriting found in Sir Thomas More "agrees with [Shakespeare's] signature, which is a simple one, and written in the ordinary character of the time."

After a detailed study of the More script, which included analysing every letter formation, and then comparing it to the signatures, Thompson concluded that "sufficient close resemblances have been detected to bring the two handwritings together and to identify them as coming from one and the same hand," and that "in this addition to the play of Sir Thomas More we have indeed the handwriting of William Shakespeare."

Thompson believed that the first two pages of the script were written quickly, using writing techniques that indicate Shakespeare had received "a more thorough training as a scribe than had been thought probable". These pages contain abbreviations and contractions of words which were "in common use among lawyers and trained secretaries of the day." These pages show more of the characteristics of "the scrivener", but the third page, having been written with slower deliberation, reveals more of Shakespeare's own quirks, or, as he put it, "more of the hand of the author". In addition there are in the three pages suggestions of a "tendency to formality and ornamental calligraphy."

== Editors' interpretations ==
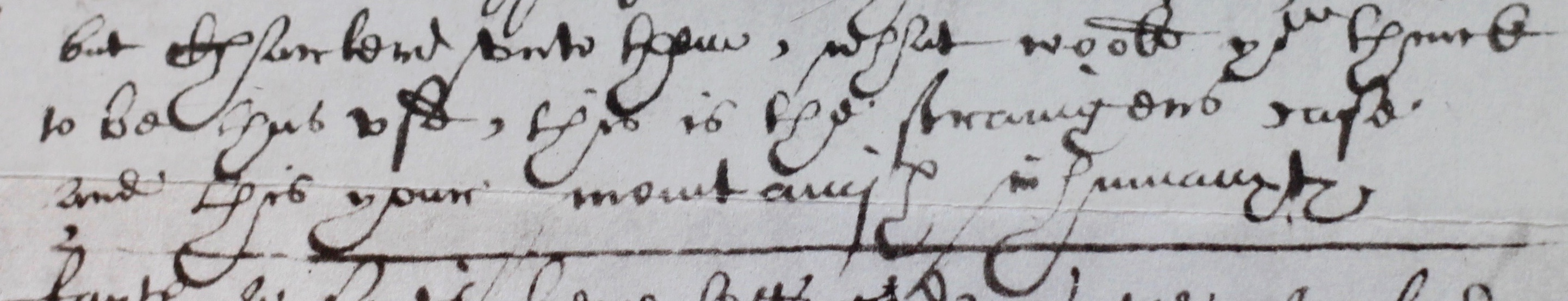
From the play, Sir Thomas More: "but chartered unto them, what would you think to be thus used, this is the strangers case and this your mountanish inhumanity"

The problems editors or compositors can face when transforming the handwritten manuscript into the printed page are demonstrated in the printed edition of Sir Thomas More, edited in 1990 by Gabrieli and Melchiori. In the following line spoken by More addressing the mob: "This is the strangers' case, and this your mountanish inhumanity," the reading of the word "mountanish" is supported by references in Twelfth Night and Cymbeline. However, in the handwritten manuscript by Hand D, the "un" in the word has only three strokes, or minims, which makes it look like an "m": as "momtanish". So the word has been read by modern editors as "moritanish" (referring to the inhabitants of Mauritania), or as "momtanish" (a contraction of "Mohamadanish"—referring to the followers of Mohammad), or as "mountainish" (suggesting huge and uncivil), as well as other readings and spellings.

== Handwriting thought by some to be Shakespeare's ==
=== A possible seventh signature on the book Archaionomia ===
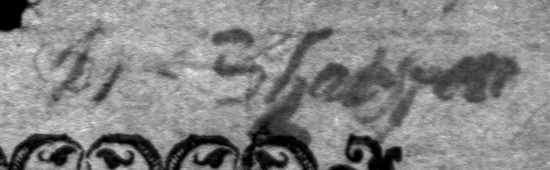
Signature discovered on the title page of Lambarde's Archaionomia. This is a reversed photograph of the ink that seeped through to the verso side of the page; the image was reversed so that the signature reads in the legible direction.

In the late 1930s a possible seventh Shakespeare signature was found in the Folger Library copy of William Lambarde's Archaionomia (1568), a collection of Anglo-Saxon laws. In 1942, Giles Dawson published a report cautiously concluding that the signature was genuine, and 30 years later he concluded that there was "an overwhelming probability that the writer of all seven signatures was the same person, William Shakespeare." Nicholas Knight published a book-length study a year later with the same conclusion. Samuel Schoenbaum considered that the signature was more likely to be genuine than not with "a better claim to authenticity than any other pretended Shakespeare autograph," while also writing that "it is premature ... to classify it as the poet's seventh signature." Stanley Wells notes that the authenticity of both the Montaigne and Lambarde signatures have had strong support.

In 2012 Gregory Heyworth, as head of the Lazarus Project, which has a mission to use advanced technology to create images of culturally important artifacts, along with his students at the University of Mississippi, used a 50-megapixel multispectral digital imaging system to enhance the signature and get a better idea of what it looked like.

=== The body of Shakespeare's last will and testament ===
The first person to claim that the body of Shakespeare's last will and testament was written in Shakespeare's own handwriting was John Cordy Jeaffreson, who compared the letters in the will and in the signature, and then expressed his findings in a letter to Athenaeum (1882). He suggests that the will was intended to be a rough draft, and that the progressively deteriorating script indicates an enfeebling illness, an illness which may have caused the "rough draft" to become the will itself.

John Pym Yeatman is another who considered that the body of the will is in Shakespeare's handwriting. In his book, Is William Shakespeare's Will Holographic? (1901), he argues against the often repeated idea that Francis Collins (or "Francis Collyns" as it is often spelled), Shakespeare's lawyer, wrote the will. Among the evidence that Yeatman offers, is Collins' signature on the will itself. Collins' name occurs three times in the will: twice in the body, and the third time when Collyns signs his name at the bottom of page three. The body of the will, along with Shakespeare's own signature, are written in handwriting known as the secretary hand, whereas the signature by Collins, particularly the initial letters, is written in a modern hand. The difference between the two handwriting styles is primarily in the formations used for each letter of the alphabet. Yeatman then states that the last insertion regarding the second-best bed, is in a handwriting that "exactly corresponds with the signature below it." This he adds, is "of the utmost value, in proof that one hand wrote them both."

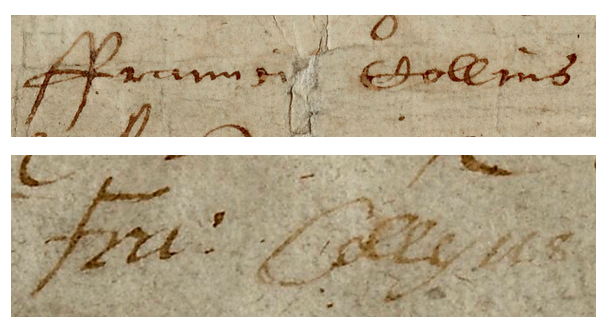
Above: The name of the lawyer "Francis Collins" as it appears in the body of the will. Below: Collins' signature on the will.

In 1985 manuscript expert Charles Hamilton compared the signatures, the handwritten additions to the play Sir Thomas More, and the body of the last will and testament. In his book In Search of Shakespeare he placed letters from each document side-by-side to demonstrate the similarities and his reasons for considering that they were written by the same hand.

The handwriting in the body of Shakespeare's last will and testament indicates that it is written all by one person in at least two sessions: First the entire will of three pages, then a revision on the lower half of the first page that runs over onto page 2, and finally the additions or bequests that are inserted between the lines. The lower half of page one, the part that was written later than page 2 and 3, shows a disintegration of the penmanship. This problem worsens until the last written line, leaving his second-best bed to his wife, is almost indecipherable. The ink used for the interlinear additions is different from the ink in the main body of the will, but it is the same ink that is used by the four witnesses that signed the will.

=== Handwriting in a letter signed by the Earl of Southampton ===
The Shakespearean scholar, Eric Sams points to a letter written by the 20-year-old Earl of Southampton to a Mr. Hicks (or Hyckes) regarding Lord Burghley, at a time when Southampton had not yet agreed to marry Burghley's granddaughter. The letter is signed by the Earl of Southampton, but the body of the letter was written by someone else. It is dated 26 June 1592, a year when it is thought that Shakespeare may have first encountered Southampton and had begun writing the sonnets. Sams notices that the handwriting in the body of the letter is literally a secretary hand, and it resembles the handwriting found in the addition to Sir Thomas More by Hand D. After close scrutiny of the letters and pen strokes in each, and referencing the detailed descriptions found in Edward Thompson's Shakespeare's Handwriting: A Study, Sams finds that there are enough similarities to merit further consideration. This letter was written by Southampton regarding one of his houses that was in need of repair, and as Eric Sams points out, it was written at a time when Southampton was the recipient of sonnets written by Shakespeare that contained imagery suggesting the young lord might consider repairing his house: "Seeking that beauteous roof to ruinate/Which to repair should be thy chief desire." (Sonnet 10, lines 7–8) And "who lets so fair a house fall to decay?" (Sonnet 13, line 9)

=== A signature on a deed for the purchase of a house ===
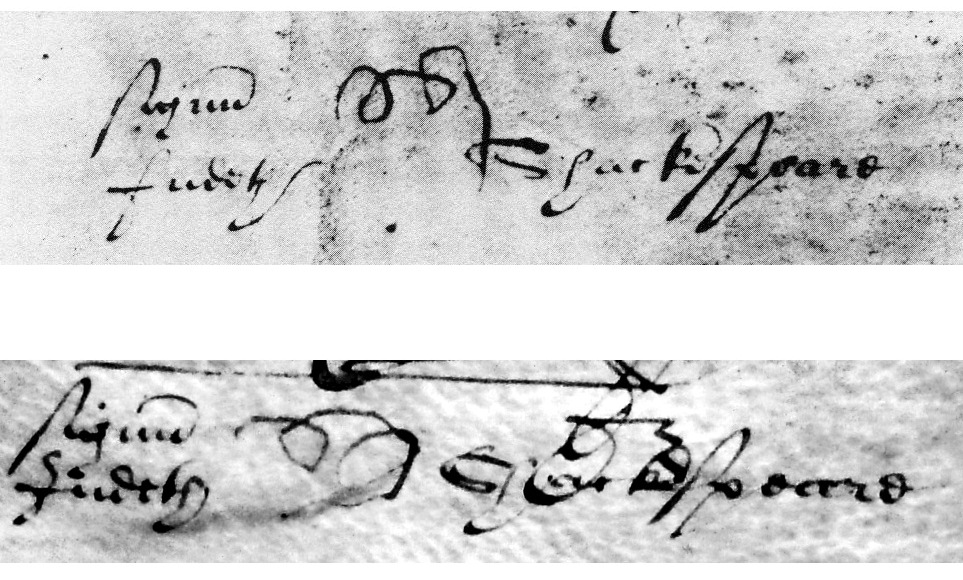
Judith Shakespeare's mark, a squiggle with two loops. Her given name and surname were added on either side of her mark.

On 4 December 1612 Shakespeare's friends, Elizabeth and Adrian Quiney, sold a house to a man named William Mountford for 131 pounds. The deed of sale, written out apparently by a legal clerk, was witnessed and signed twice in different parts of the deed by William Shakespeare's daughter, Judith, who used for her signature a squiggle with two loops in it. Judith's given name and surname were written out on either side of Judith's marks, by someone who was not the clerk, or the witnesses or the signers. Paleographer Charles Hamilton studied this document and found that Judith's surname as it is written out is so similar to the surname in Shakespeare's own signature as it appears on other documents, that it may be reasonable to consider that Shakespeare could have been there at the signing of the deed, and assisted his daughter as she made her mark. Hamilton considers that there may be reasons for Shakespeare not witnessing the document himself. For example, he could have been involved in some way that would have precluded him from acting as witness, either in the drawing up of the deed or in advising the Quineys.

=== The applications to grant a coat-of-arms to John Shakespeare ===
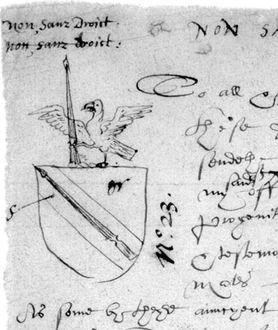
A pen-and-ink sketch of Shakespeare's shield drawn on the first rough draft of the application to grant a coat-of-arms to John Shakespeare.

On 20 October 1596 a rough draft was drawn up for an application to the College of Heralds for Shakespeare's father to be granted a coat-of-arms. This draft has numerous emendations and corrections, and it appears to have been written by someone "inexperienced in drawing up heraldic drafts." The script is written at a great speed, but with the fluid, easy character of one well practiced with a quill. The velocity of the writing is increased by shortcuts and abbreviations. Formalities of punctuation and consistent spelling are left behind, as words are pared down. Loops and tails are sheared, and letters are flattened for speed. The handwriting slows down only to produce a clearly legible italic script for proper nouns and family names. Later that day, the same person drew up a second rough draft based on the first one, incorporating the edits that were indicated in the previous draft. This application was ultimately successful, and the coat-of-arms was granted.

A third application was drafted three years later in 1599. This time it was applying to have impaled onto Shakespeare's coat-of-arms, the arms of the Ardens of Wilmcote, Shakespeare's mother's family. All three drafts include a pen-and-ink sketch of the proposed coat-of-arms: a shield, with a spear, surmounted by a falcon standing on its left leg, grasping a spear with its right talon. The coat-of-arms is seen to be pictorially expressing Shakespeare's name with the verb "shake" shown by the falcon with its fluttering wings grasping a "spear".

William Dethick is mentioned in all the application drafts, as the "Garter-Principal king of Arms in England". It has been suggested that Dethick wrote the drafts, but Dethick's handwriting, a combination of secretary and italic scripts, appears to be quite different. The idea that Shakespeare himself made out the applications, and that it is his handwriting on the rough drafts, was first raised by Samuel A. Tannenbaum. Author and handwriting expert Charles Hamilton, following Tannenbaum's suggestion, published examples of handwriting from the applications alongside examples of handwriting by Hand D from the play, Sir Thomas More. Hamilton considers that a comparison of the handwriting in the examples indicates that the same person wrote both, and along with other evidence, that it was Shakespeare.

=== Edward III ===
Though the playwright's handwriting for Edward III has not survived, the text, as printed, has been analyzed in order to discover indications of characteristics that the handwriting might contain, in the same way that the First Folio and other printed texts have been scrutinized.

This has led to findings that may support the attribution of this play to Shakespeare. For example, scholar Eric Sams, assuming that the pages by Hand D in the play Sir Thomas More are indeed Shakespeare's, points out that Hand D shows what scholar Alfred W. Pollard refers to as "excessive carelessness" in minim errors—that is, writing the wrong number of downstrokes in the letters i, m, n, and u. This particular characteristic is indicated in numerous misreadings by the original compositor who set the printed type for Edward III. This is also found in the Good Quartos, which are thought to be printed from Shakespeare's handwritten manuscripts. For a second example, Hand D uses a short horizontal stroke above a letter to indicate contraction, but twice omits it. This characteristic is indicated by the compositor's misreadings in a number of instances found in Edward III. And in another example, Hand D and the Good Quartos often show "the frequent and whimsical appearance of an initial capital C, in a way which shows that Shakespeare's pen was fond of using this letter in place of the minuscule." This characteristic occurs throughout both the Sonnets and Edward III.

== Forgeries ==
=== The Ireland Shakespeare forgeries ===
In London in the 1790s, author Samuel Ireland announced a great discovery of Shakespearean manuscripts, including four plays. This turned out to be a hoax created with great effort by his son William Henry Ireland. It fooled many experts, and caused great excitement; a production of one of the plays was announced. Shakespearean scholar Edmond Malone was one who was not taken in. The forged handwriting and signatures bore little or no resemblance to Shakespeare's. Malone said it was a clumsy fraud filled with errors and contradictions, and detailed his reasons. William Henry Ireland eventually confessed.

=== A forged signature on a book by Montaigne ===
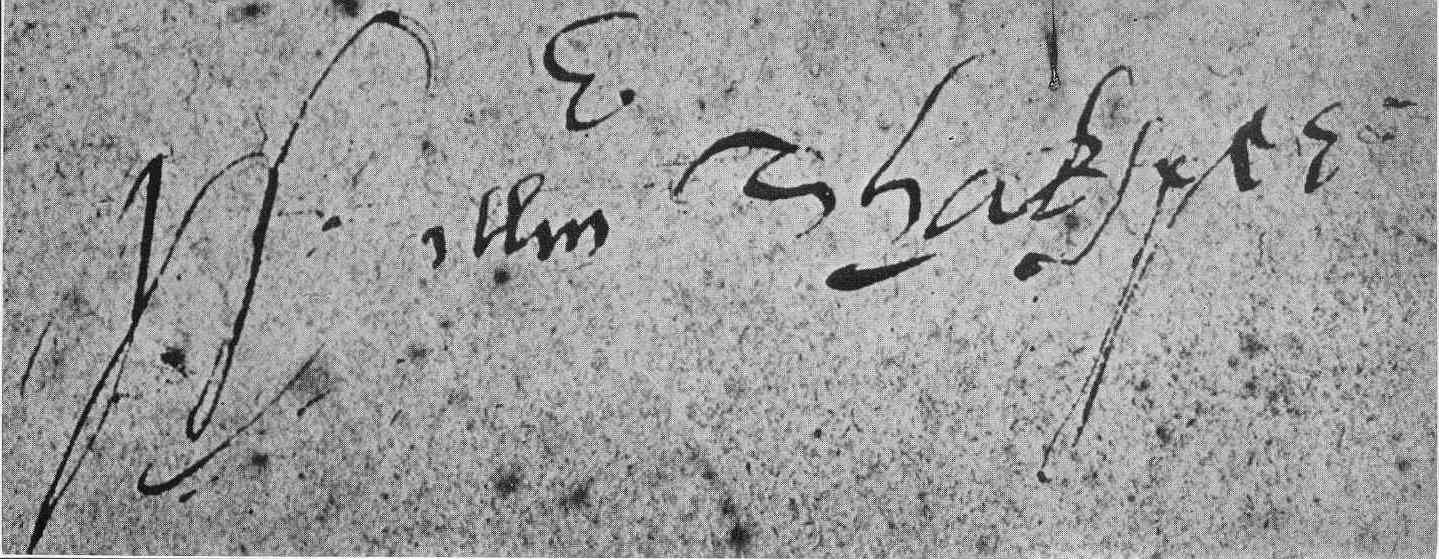
The alleged signature in Florio's translation of Montaigne.

On a loose fly-leaf of a copy of John Florio's translation of the works of Montaigne, is a signature that reads "Willm. Shakspere". The signature is now widely recognized as a poor forgery, but it has taken in scholars in the past. The book's first known owner was the Reverend Edward Patteson, who lived in the 1780s in Staffordshire, a few miles from Stratford-upon-Avon. The book was auctioned for a large amount (100 pounds) in 1838 to a London bookseller named Pickering, who then sold it to the British Museum. Frederic Madden accepted it as authentic in his pamphlet Observations on an Autograph of Shakspere and the Orthography of his name (1838), and so did Samuel A. Tannenbaum in his essay "Reclaiming One of Shakspere's Signatures" (1925). Others, including John Louis Haney writing in 1906, were not taken in. A close consideration and analysis of the signature and each letter shows it to differ markedly from any of the authentic signatures.
