= Shakespeare coat of arms =

English coat of arms used by William Shakespeare

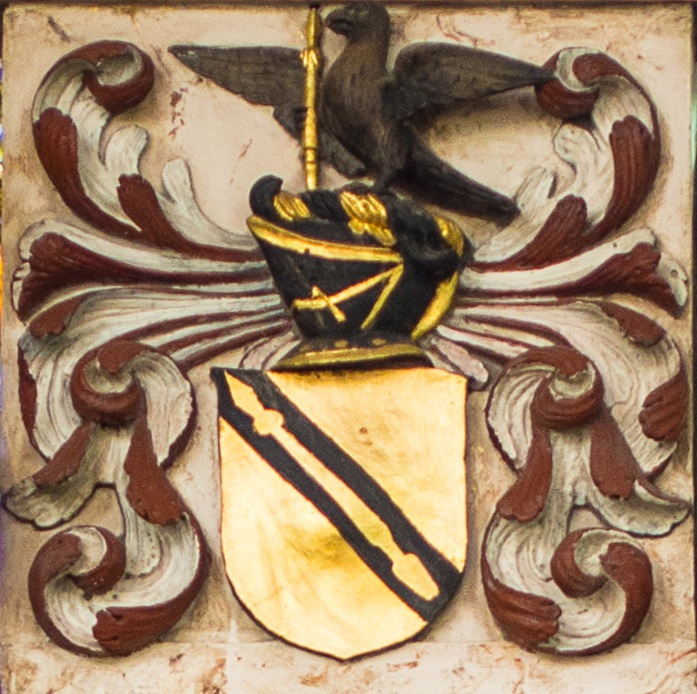
The Shakespeare coat of arms, detail of Shakespeare's funerary monument, Holy Trinity Church, Stratford

The Shakespeare coat of arms is an English coat of arms. It was granted to John Shakespeare (c. 1531 – 1601), a glover from Stratford-upon-Avon, Warwickshire, in 1596, and was used by his son, the playwright William Shakespeare (1564 – 1616), and other descendants.

== History ==
John Shakespeare made enquiries concerning a coat of arms around 1575. Possibly he met the herald Robert Cooke of the College of Arms when Cooke visited Warwickshire. Cooke may have designed the "pattern" that was later granted. John had been a bailiff and had the social standing and marriage that made such a request possible. Nothing came of it, presumably because of economic difficulties; such applications were expensive.

In 1596, the application was renewed, either by John or by his son William on John's (and probably William's own) behalf. As the eldest son, William could make a request for his family to be granted a coat of arms. At the time, William had enough money, and could hope for support from influential men such as Henry Wriothesley, Earl of Southampton and Robert Devereux, Earl of Essex.

Two drafts of the grant document from 1596, written by the herald William Dethick, have been preserved. The drafts have minor differences, and would have been used as a basis for the official grant or "letters patent", which as far as is known no longer exists, though there is a late 17th-century copy. According to the palaeographer Charles Hamilton, the drafts were written by William, and if so they are existing examples of his handwriting. The heraldry scholar Wilfrid Scott-Giles suggests that the changes and additions that can be seen on the drafts may have been made during discussions between William and the heralds.

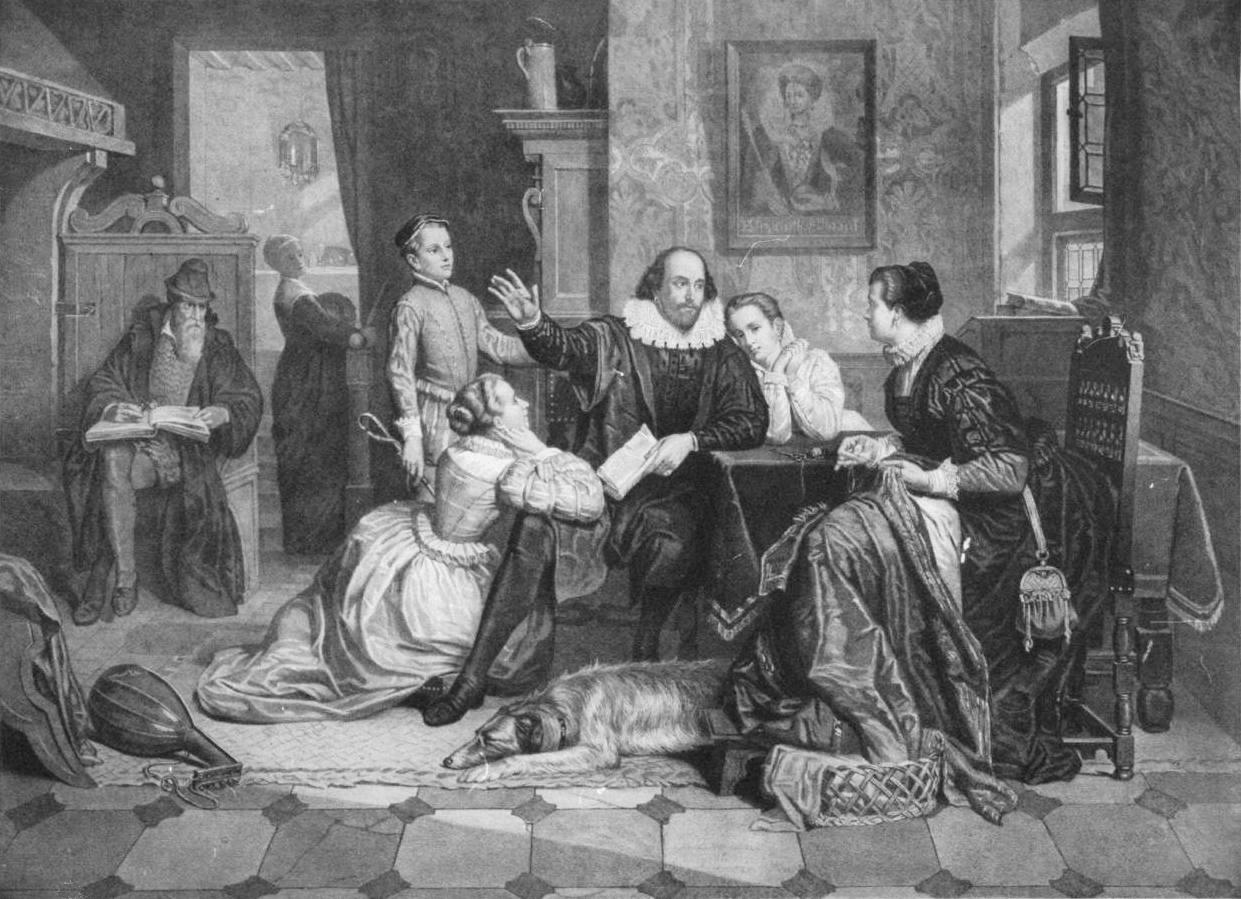
Artistic depiction of the Shakespeare family, late 19th century

William's and his wife Anne's only son, the 11-year-old Hamnet, died and was buried only a few months before the application was approved. They now had no son to inherit the sought-after honour. William wrote in Macbeth, 10 years later:

Upon my head they placed a fruitless crown
And put a barren sceptre in my grip,
Thence to be wrenched with an unlineal hand,
No son of mine succeeding.

A draft document from 1599 requests that the coat of arms of the Shakespeare family be combined, or impaled, with that of the Arden family, the higher-ranked family of John's wife Mary. It is likely that she wanted the Arden family's coat of arms to descend to their children, but this only became possible after her husband's grant. It appears that the coat of arms of a more prestigious branch of the Arden family was requested, but stricken from the draft.

According to the Shakespeare scholar James S. Shapiro, the 1599 document includes embellishments and outright fabrications. The clergyman William Harrison wrote in 1577 that the heralds "do of custom pretend antiquity and service, and many gay things thereunto". For unknown reasons, the Shakespeares did not use the combined version, which would have been considered of higher status. Possibly it was never granted. Scott-Giles hypothesises that William simply found the un-combined version more aesthetically pleasing.

In 1602, Ralph Brooke, a rival of Dethick, challenged a number of coats of arms approved by Dethick, including Shakespeare's. According to Brooke, the Shakespeares did not qualify, and the coat of arms was too similar to an existing coat of arms. Dethick argued that there was sufficient distinction, and noted John Shakespeare's qualifications. The dispute seems to have been resolved in Dethick's favour.

The coat of arms can be seen on the seal of William's daughter Susanna Hall, and can partly be seen on the wax seal of the will of her daughter Elizabeth Barnard, the playwright's last surviving descendant.

== Description ==
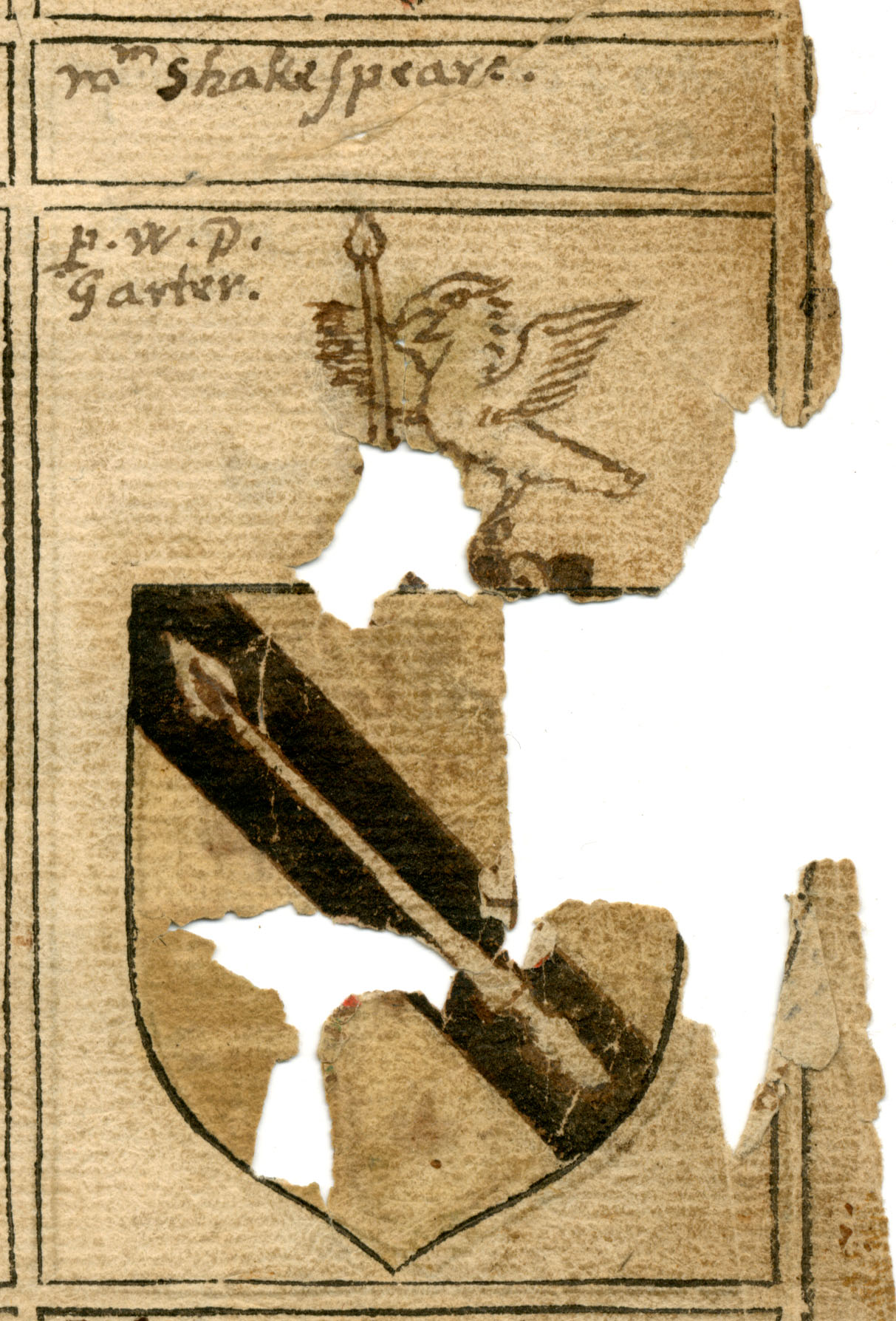
1602 version by William Smith, Rouge Dragon

The 1596 drafts of the grant document define the coat of arms this way:

Gold, on a bend sable [black diagonal bar], a spear of the first [gold, the first colour mentioned], steeled argent [with a silver head]; and for his crest... a falcon his wings displayed argent [silver], standing on a wreath of his colours supporting a spear gold, steeled as aforesaid, set upon a helmet with mantles and tassles.

Added is a simple sketch and what is presumed to be a motto, Non Sanz Droict, old French for "Not without right". There is no indication that the motto was ever used by the Shakespeares, though it has been taken for a motto by the Warwickshire County Council. In what may have been a joke on the part of the writer, the motto was first written Non, Sanz Droict, "No, without right". This was stricken and corrected.

== Symbolism ==
The spear is an allusion to the family name and the falcon, with "shaking" wings, could refer to an interest in hunting. Shakespeare scholar Katherine Duncan-Jones connects the falcon to the coat of arms of Henry Wriothesley, which displays 4 silver falcons or hawks. However, the Shakespeare design may have been made when William was a boy, and if so, there is no such connection.

She proposes that the colours on the shield imply that the Shakespeare family had included crusading knights. The spear, or lance, can be seen as resembling a silver-tipped golden pen.

Scott-Giles states that apart from the connection between the spear and the family name, the design has no obvious other meaning.

== Similar coats of arms ==
The coat of arms of the Shakespeare baronets

Similar coats of arms have been granted to people named Shakespeare in 1858, 1918, and in 1946, when the Shakespeare Baronetcy was created.

== In fiction ==
A speech in the play Richard II, written around 1595, mentions a lance and a falcon, possibly inspired by William's dealings with the heralds. The falcon is the type of bird most often mentioned in his plays.

It has been suggested that William's friend Ben Jonson alluded to the coat of arms in the 1599 comedy Every Man out of His Humour. In this play, the rustic Sogliardo, who has just purchased a coat of arms, is told to take the motto Not without mustard.

The character Claudius Marcus wears the coat of arms in the 1968 Star Trek episode "Bread and Circuses".

In the 2016 British sitcom Upstart Crow, John's desire and William's application for a coat of arms is a recurring plot point. It is granted in the episode "Wild Laughter in the Throat of Death".

== Gallery ==
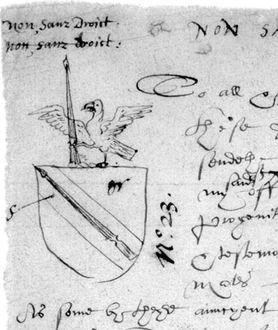
Sketch from draft document, 1596.

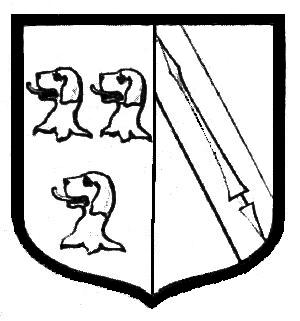
Coat of arms of John Hall, William Shakespeare's son-in-law, combined with the Shakespeare coat of arms.

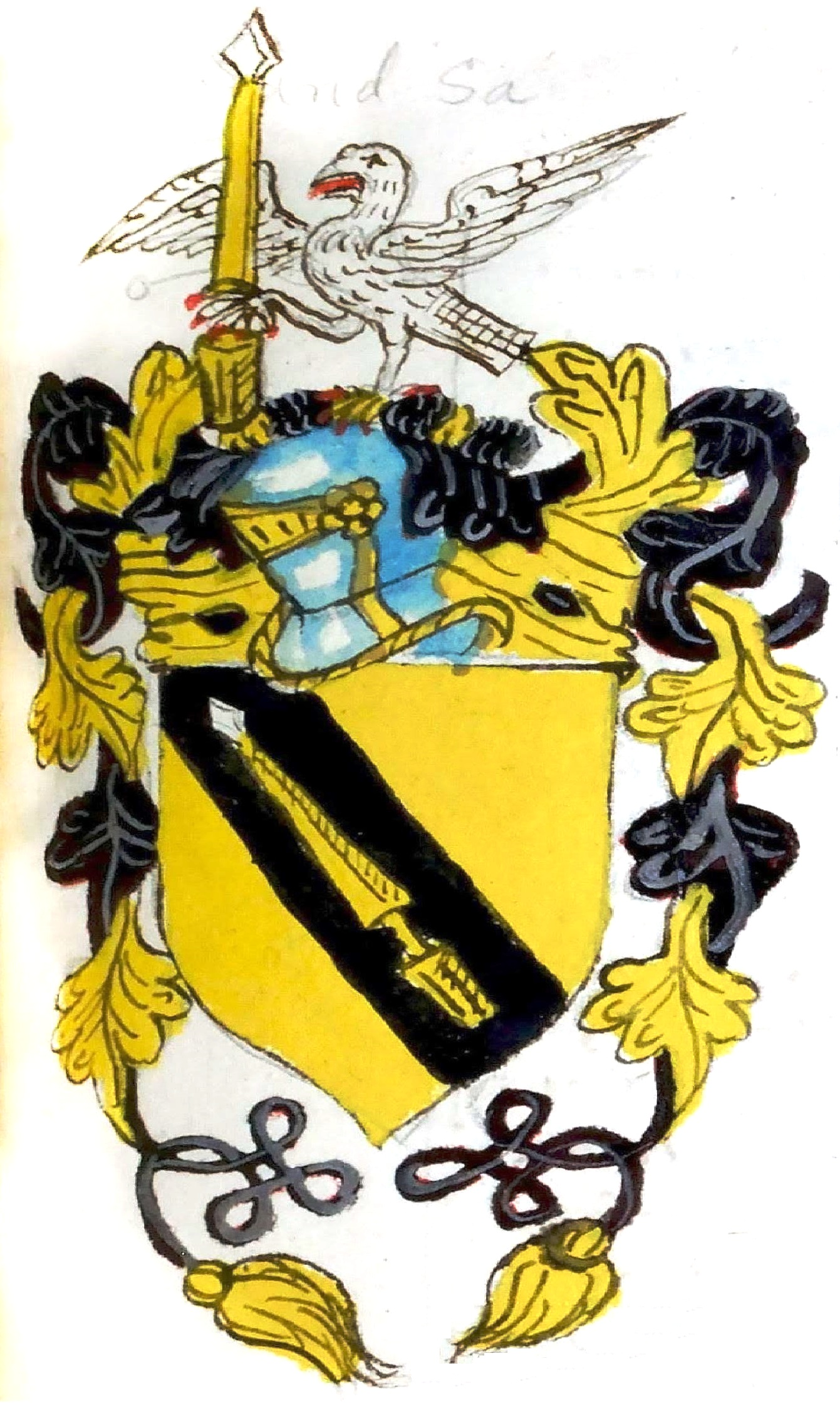
Late 17th-century version.

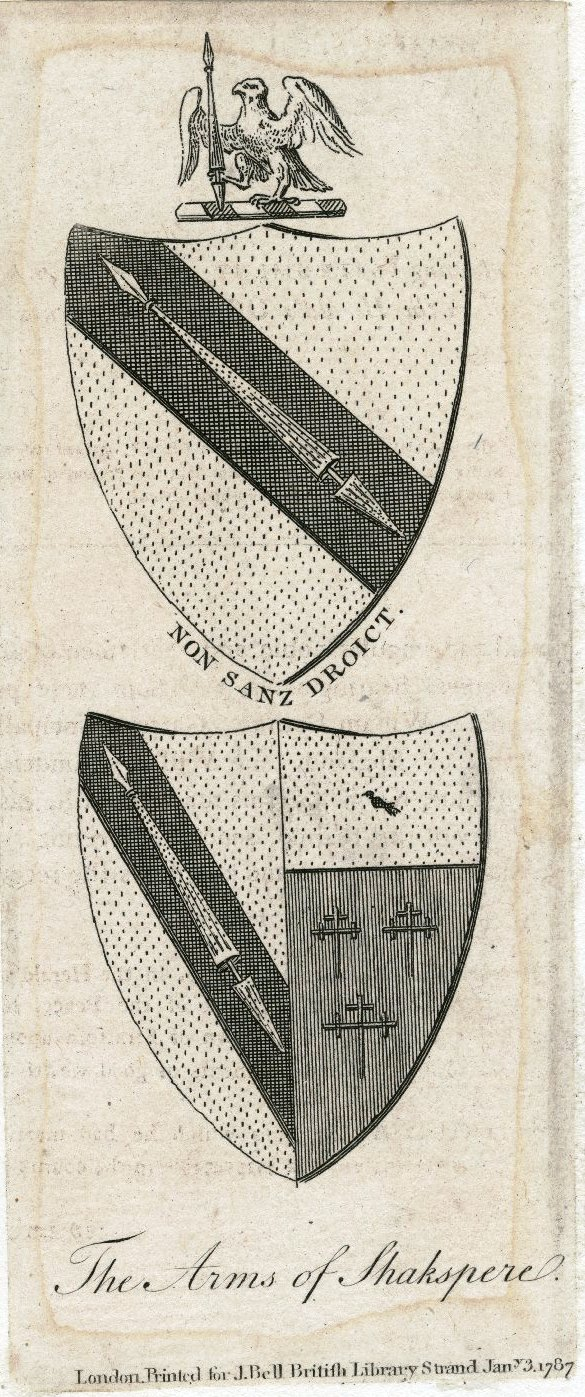
Version from 1787, Arden family combination below

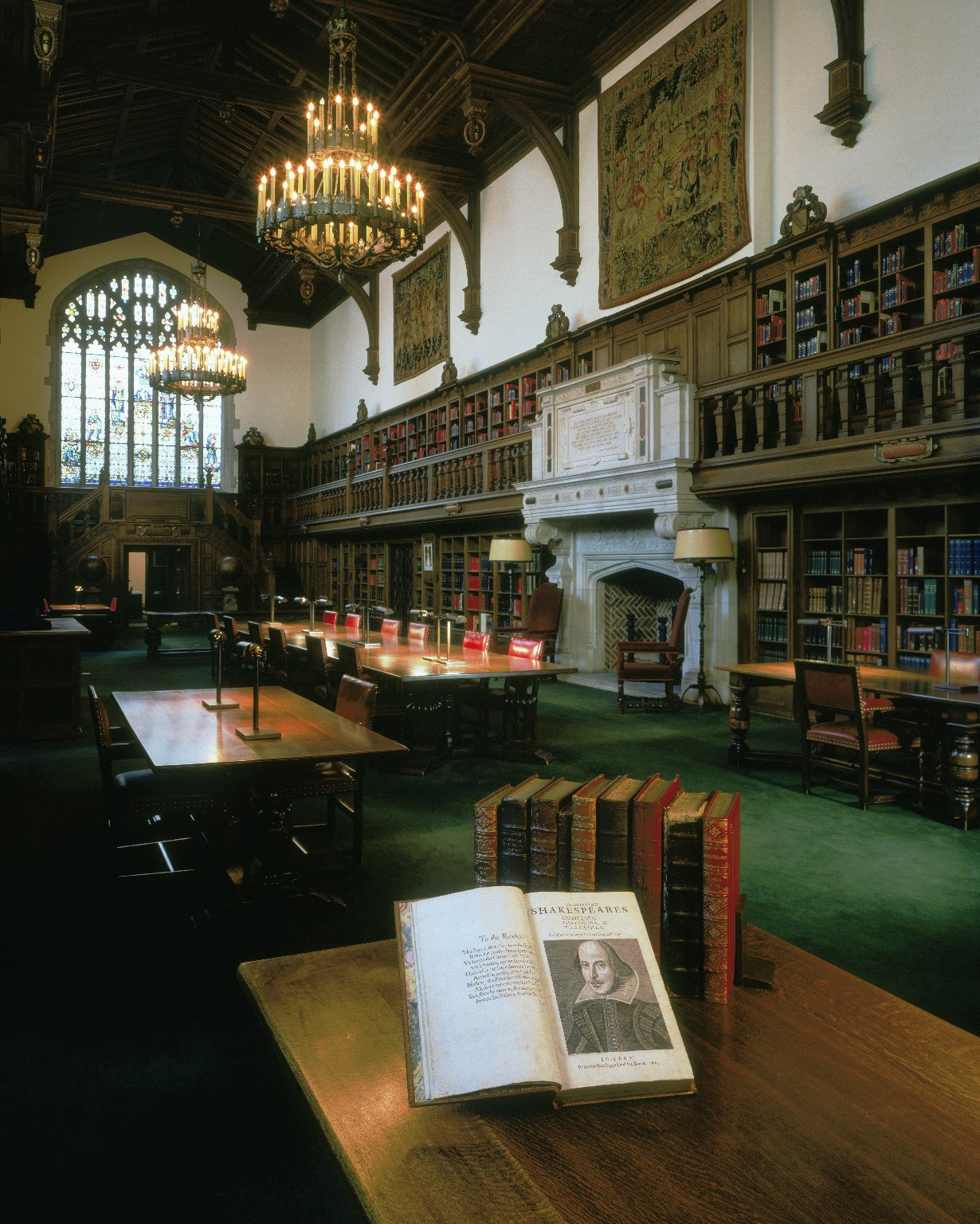
The Gail Kern Paster Reading Room at the Folger Shakespeare Library, with bookshelves decorated with the coat of arms

John Shakespeare (Harry Enfield) celebrating his coat of arms in the sitcom Upstart Crow.

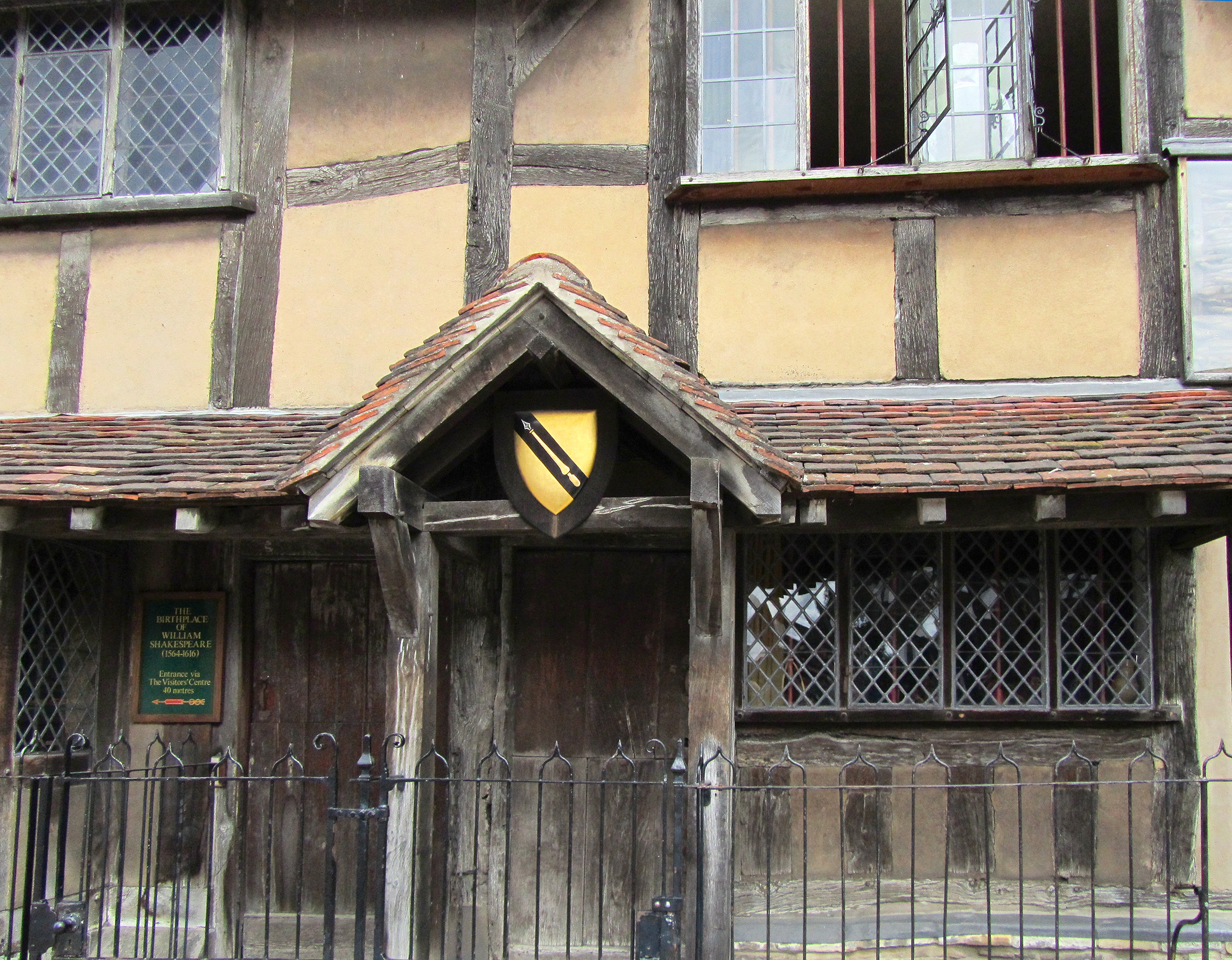
Shakespeare's Birthplace, with coat of arms displayed.

== See also ==
- Shakespeare's signet ring, a seal ring that may have belonged to William Shakespeare
- Heather Wolfe, Shakespeare coat of arms scholar
