= Samuel A. Tannenbaum =

Hungarian academic (1874–1948)

Samuel Aaron Tannenbaum (1874–1948) was a literary scholar, bibliographer, and palaeographer, best known for his work on William Shakespeare and his contemporaries.

== Life and career ==
Tannenbaum was born in Hungary, then part of the Austro-Hungarian Empire. He immigrated to the United States in 1886, the year he turned fourteen, and became a citizen in 1895. Graduating from the Columbia University College of Physicians and Surgeons in 1898, he pursued a career in psychotherapy, with a strong interest in the work of Sigmund Freud. He was part of the circle of early Freud supporters that included Ernest Jones and Sándor Ferenczi, and was connected with early efforts to establish an English-language journal of psychotherapy. He published on medical and psychological subjects, including the books The Psychology of Accidents (1924) and The Patient's Dilemma (1935).

He was the editor of the Shakespeare Association Bulletin, and through the first half of the twentieth century produced a wide range of books and articles on Shakespeare and other figures of English Renaissance theatre and literature. Combining his two major areas of interest, psychology and Elizabethan literature, Tannenbaum was one of the first commentators to consider the nature of Shakespeare's sexuality from a Freudian perspective. He also published a major series of bibliographies on significant Elizabethan and Jacobean figures that were important scholarly resources in their era. His second wife, the former Dorothy Rosenzweig (married 1942), collaborated with him on some of his later publications.

As an amateur or self-taught palaeographer, Tannenbaum took positions and presented arguments on issues involving this area of Shakespeare studies, burgeoning at the time—though he often ended up on the side opposite the evolving scholarly and critical consensus. He was intensely skeptical of the view that Shakespeare contributed to the revision of the play Sir Thomas More, and argued against the work of Sir Edward Maunde Thompson and his collaborators. Tannenbaum also was deeply involved on the question of the forgeries of John Payne Collier. He believed the entire account book of the Office of the Master of the Revels was a Collier forgery—a view that has found no other defenders, though several other scholars, such as Charlotte Stopes, argued that the Revels accounts book was a partial forgery. He was also convinced that Simon Forman's Book of Plays was a Collier forgery, a position that only a minority of commentators support.

== Selected books ==
- The Shakespeare Coat-of-Arms, 1908
- The Booke of Sir Thomas Moore: A Bibliotic Study, 1927
- Problems in Shakespeare's Penmanship, 1927
- The Assassination of Christopher Marlowe, 1928
- Shakespere Forgeries in the Revels Accounts, 1928
- The Handwriting of the Renaissance, 1930
- Shakespearian Scraps and Other Elizabethan Fragments, 1933
- Christopher Marlowe, A Concise Bibliography, 1937
- Shakespeare's "King Lear," A Concise Bibliography (Elizabethan Bibliographies, No. 16), 1940
- John Webster, A Concise Bibliography (Elizabethan Bibliographies, No. 19), 1941
- Michael Drayton, A Concise Bibliography (Elizabethan Bibliographies, No. 22), 1941
- Sir Philip Sydney, A Concise Bibliography, 1941
- Samuel Daniel, A Concise Bibliography, 1942
- George Herbert, A Concise Bibliography, 1946 (with Dorothy Tannenbaum)
