= Death of Death =

Death of Death may refer to:

- The Death of Death in the Death of Christ, a 1648 book by John Owen
- The Death of Death, a 2000 comic miniseries by George A. Romero
- La Muerte de la Muerte, a 2018 book by Jose Cordeiro and David Wood
