= Capt. Thomas Moore =

Capt. Thomas Moore may refer to:

- Captain Tom Moore (1920–2021), British Army officer and fundraiser
- Capt. Thomas Moore House, a historic home in Pennsylvania

== See also ==
- Thomas Moore (disambiguation)
