= Six Ideas that Shaped Physics =

Calculus based introductory physics textbook

- Author: Thomas A. Moore
- Publisher: McGraw Hill
- Publication date: 2002
- Publication place: United States
- ISBN: 9781264876822
- Website: www.physics.pomona.edu/sixideas

Six Ideas that Shaped Physics is a textbook in calculus based physics, written by Thomas A. Moore based on his introductory course in college physics at Pomona College. It covers special relativity, quantum mechanics, and thermodynamics. The impetus for the project to author the book came from the 1987-1996 Introductory University Physics Project (IUPP), which found that most college texts neglected to teach topics in 20th century physics.

== Contents ==
The books opens with 20th century physics, starting with the conservation laws implied by Noether's theorem. It then proceeds to present Newtonian mechanics and the laws of motion as a consequence of underlying physical symmetry, reversing the chronological order in which the study of physics developed as a scientific discipline. The courses include Unit C: Conservation Laws Constrain Interactions (14 chapters), Unit N: The Laws of Physics are Universal (12 chapters), Unit R: The Laws of Physics are Frame-Independent (9 chapters), Unit E: Electric and Magnetic Fields are Unified (20 chapters), Unit Q: Particles Behave Like Waves (15 chapters), and Unit T: Some Processes are Irreversible (11 chapters).

== Editions ==
First published in 1998, it has been widely adopted and is now in the Fourth edition.
