= American Rescue Workers =

Christian denomination and charity in the United States

The American Rescue Workers is a Christian denomination and charity in the United States. The organization was founded in 1882 by Thomas E. Moore as a splinter group from The Salvation Army in response to financial disagreements between Moore and Salvation Army founder William Booth. In 1885 the organization officially adopted a charter as the Salvation Army of America, but in 1913 it was renamed American Rescue Workers and has functioned under this name since that time. Its quasi-military organization suggests that the charity retains similarities to the Salvation Army as with the Volunteers of America. The charity operates shelters for the homeless, workshops for the disabled, and halfway houses for the chemically dependent in addition to engaging in evangelism. American Rescue Workers publishes a quarterly periodical, The Rescue Herald.

The Church has a membership of 2700, and is headquartered in Williamsport, Pennsylvania.
