= Thomas More in Prison, Visited by His Wife and Daughter =

Painting by Claudius Jacquand

Thomas More, Lord High Chancellor of England
- Thomas More, grand chancelier d'Angleterre. (French)
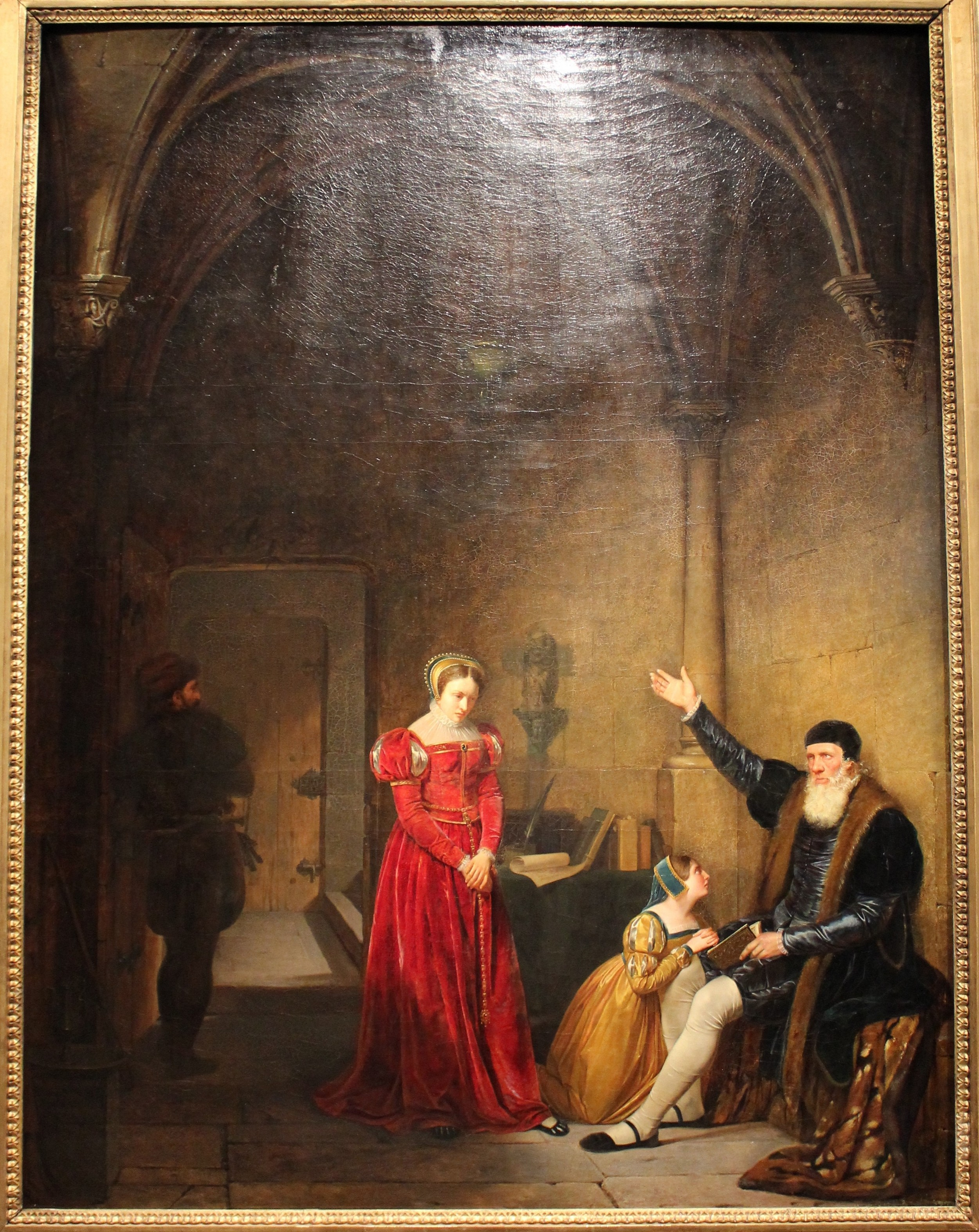
- Artist: Claudius Jacquand
- Year: 1828
- Medium: Oil on canvas
- Subject: Thomas More
- Dimensions: 120.5 cm × 95.5 cm (47.4 in × 37.5 in)
- Location: Museum of Fine Arts of Lyon, Lyon

Thomas More in Prison, Visited by His Wife and Daughter or Thomas More en prison (and various other titles) is a history painting of 1828 by Claudius Jacquand. It has been in the collection of the Museum of Fine Arts of Lyon since soon after its completion.

The painting depicts English humanist Thomas More while in prison at the Tower of London, with his wife and daughter. His daughter is at his feet begging him to accept the Act of Supremacy and thus avoiding the death penalty. Alice More, his wife, is standing, dressed in red, a colour that seems to preclude his husband's upcoming martyrdom.

In 2014 it was part of the exhibition L'invention du Passé. Histoires de cœur et d'épée 1802-1850.
