= Tommy Moore (comedian) =

American comedian

Tommy Moore (born December 7, 1950) is an American comedian, clown, and motivational speaker versed in the styles of vaudeville and Catskill comedy. His act is filled with classic jokes, original material, props, costumes, improv, and misguided magic, drawing heavily on audience participation. Billed as The Professor of Fun, he has been called the "man who put the FUN back in Funny".

== Early life ==
Moore was born in West Philadelphia to parents John and Ann. He received a formal Catholic school and later private-academy education, but was more interested in comedy than curriculum. He made a deal with his parents that if he pulled straight A's he could stay up late and watch programs like The Red Skelton Show, The Danny Thomas Show, The Steve Allen Show and more on TV. He would then re-enact them for his classmates the next day at school.

Moore particularly enjoyed watching stand-up comics on The Ed Sullivan Show, counting among his favorites Red Buttons, Shecky Greene, Buddy Hackett, Jackie Mason, Danny Thomas, and Bill Cosby. At age six, he halted blowing out the candles on his birthday cake because comedian Jack Carter was on TV. After Carter finished his guest spot, Moore at last blew out the candles.

At age seven, Moore saw his first live nightclub comic, Cozy Morley, at Club Avalon in North Wildwood, New Jersey. By age nine, Moore earned his first dollars doing puppet shows at other children's birthday parties. Upon seeing comedy magician Carl Ballantine, of McHale's Navy fame, on The Ed Sullivan Show, Moore began spending every dollar at magic shops. He soon began performing his own comedy magic act at hospital shows throughout the city as part of The South Philadelphia Talent Workshop.

Moore earned a bachelor's degree in Elementary Ed. from Saint Joseph's University, but while others were reading school books and listening to rock 'n' roll, Moore turned to joke books (he now has over 800) and collecting comedy records (last count 1,200 plus) housed in an office that looks "like a mini museum of American comedy".

In 1977, he married Suzanne Martin and moved to the Philadelphia suburbs. Today they live in North Carolina.

== Career ==
By the 1970s, Moore was performing in the vein of his comedy idols, with clean, family-friendly material. But the comedy landscape was changing, as the country embraced the observational material of Robert Klein and David Brenner, and as George Carlin and David Steinberg popularized introspective and often controversial subjects. Moore, now performing regularly in New York City, followed the trend, as reflected in his two albums, Did I Say That? and I'm Telling You What They Told Me! (both for Castle Records). He was now working steadily as a comic, but didn't feel good about his act. The “warmth that had brought him to comedy was missing.”

So by 1980, Moore turned his act from the commercially popular style to a post-modern homage to the Borsht Belt and vaudeville styles he loved. During the comedy boom of the '80s, Moore moved from the Palumbo's/Downingtown Inn circuit to the comedy club scene. His act, now a departure from normal comedy club faire, was a surprise hit. Before long, he was developing many of his signature bits, including audience participation routines like Gilligan's Island, The Amateur Magician, and The Trip to Hawaii.

It was also in the 1980s that Moore added journalism to his résumé, writing the bi-weekly column Comedy Corner for eleven years as a staff member of The Out On The Town Entertainment Guide. He interviewed and profiled hundreds of American comedians, including George Burns and Harry Anderson. He also wrote comedy book reviews for the Philadelphia Daily News, and contributed articles to MAD and Parade magazines.

During the course of his career, Moore would land prestigious gigs at the famed New York Copacabana, as well as many Philadelphia-area institutions, including Lilly Langtry's and The American Academy of Music, as well as Caesar's Resorts, Mt. Airy Lodge, Stricklands, Fernwood, and Mt. Laurel hotels (all in the Pocono Mountains) and performances at Caesars, Harrah's, Trump Plaza, Showboat, Playboy, Golden Nugget, and Tropicana hotels in Atlantic City. Moore also opened for national headliner acts such as Chubby Checker, Bobby Rydell, Dionne Warwick, The Platters, The Coasters, The Dovells, Jay & The Americans, Jackie Vernon, and Pat Paulsen. On TV and radio, he joined Steve Allen, Alan King, Soupy Sales, Joan Rivers, and Robert Goulet.

In the 1990s, Moore was approached by Temple University to teach a course on the health benefits of humor. This resulted in such courses as Laugh Away the Stress, Humor As A Life Skill, Stand-Up Comedy Performance, Comedy From A to Z, The History of American Comedy, and The Comedy Legends, which were among the most popular in the school's course guide. It was these classes that landed him the moniker The Professor of Fun, and laid the groundwork for his corporate seminars on effectively using humor to reduce stress in the workplace. His corporate clients have included AT&T, American Express, General Electric, Dupont, and AARP.

In August, 1993, Moore's humor, upbeat and optimistic approach led to his being targeted by the Department of Defense for a tour of Army and Air Force Bases in Germany, Iceland, England, Belgium, and The Netherlands.

From 2000 to 2008, Moore returned to the showbiz reviews of a bygone era, headlining such shows as Greg Thompson's Celebrations on Ice, Showboat Casino's Basin Street Follies, L&M Production's The Catskills Come to You, Ace in The Hole Productions' Christmas Magic, Mardi Gras Carnival, Love of the Irish, That's Italian, Funny Valentines, Honky Tonk Angels, and Ragtime Rascals.

Moore's clean brand of comedy has afforded him the ability to do fundraisers for religious and charitable organizations such as The United Church of Christ, B'nai B'rith, The Knights of Columbus, B'rith Sholom, The Jerry Lewis Telethon, Toys for Tots, The Variety Club, The American Cancer Society, UNICEF, National Tay–Sachs, and The Family Services Division of The Armed Forces.

Moore ends his show with the following statement, driving home his message: “Tonight we've had some music, and some magic, and some laughs. If you remember nothing else from my show, please remember this: There's more music in the fact that the waves lap against the shore than in all the songs ever written! There's more magic in the fact that the stars light up the sky than in all the tricks ever invented! And there's more laughter in the funny, silly things we do every day than in all the jokes ever told! Learn to listen for the music, Learn to look for the magic, Learn to hear the laughter, and every day, you'll have a ticket to the greatest show on earth – YOUR LIFE!”

== Survivor ==
On April 2, 1986, Moore was subject to a brutal assault and robbery. He was beaten, bound and gagged, but used his magician's training to escape the ropes that held him. The attack left him requiring 186 stitches to his head, plus a broken arm, leg, and several broken fingers. He was placed under twenty-four-hour police guard while hospitalized, since the police believed his assailant had murdered several other victims. The mugger was soon captured and sentenced to life in prison. During Moore's ordeal, many in the Philadelphia comedy community believed he would never set foot onstage again, but maintaining the attitude of a "trouper", he set out to quickly prove them wrong. Five days after the assault, in bandages and casts, he took the stage at La Salle University with the introduction, "Direct from the Emergency Ward – Tommy Moore". Since then, he has performed more than 2,500 shows, speeches, and seminars. He says the incident has actually strengthened his outlook on life, and his faith in God, whom he credits with helping him survive that day.

== Books ==
On August 10, 2011, Moore published A Ph.D. in Happiness From the Great Comedians that reveals how observations and personal advice from famous comedians, including George Burns, Jackie Mason, Jay Leno, Harry Anderson and Rosie O'Donnell, helped him cope with the 1986 assault and other issues, from depression and obesity to money struggles. On November 30, 2017, Moore released his second book, Joketelling 101: How I Never Let School Interfere with My (Comedy) Education, which offers advice to new comedians on how to tell a joke based on his lectures at Temple University. Moore's third book, Comedians Telling Tales Out of School, was released on November 23, 2018. It features previously unpublished stories and interviews from his long-running "Comedy Corner" column for Out on the Town magazine.

== TV appearances ==
The Funniest Person in America – Showtime
The People's Choice Awards – ABC
The Jane Whitney Show – CBS
The Road to Comedy – PBS
Maury Povich's People Are Talking – KYW
The Joe Franklin Show – WWOR
Evening Magazine – KYW
Weekend With The Stars – KYW
Saturday Night Dead – KYW
AM Philadelphia – WPVI
Good Day Philadelphia – WTXF
In Search of The 3 Stooges – WTAF
Laughing in The New Year – WTAF
The Out on the Town Show – WKBS
