= Thomas A. Moore =

American theoretical astrophysicist

Thomas A. Moore is an American theoretical astrophysicist. He is the Reuben C. and Eleanor Winslow Memorial Professor of Mathematics and Natural Science at Pomona College in Claremont, California, where he has taught since 1987. He is the author of the textbooks Six Ideas that Shaped Physics (2002) and A General Relativity Workbook (2009).
