= The Death of Death in the Death of Christ =

1648 book by John Owen

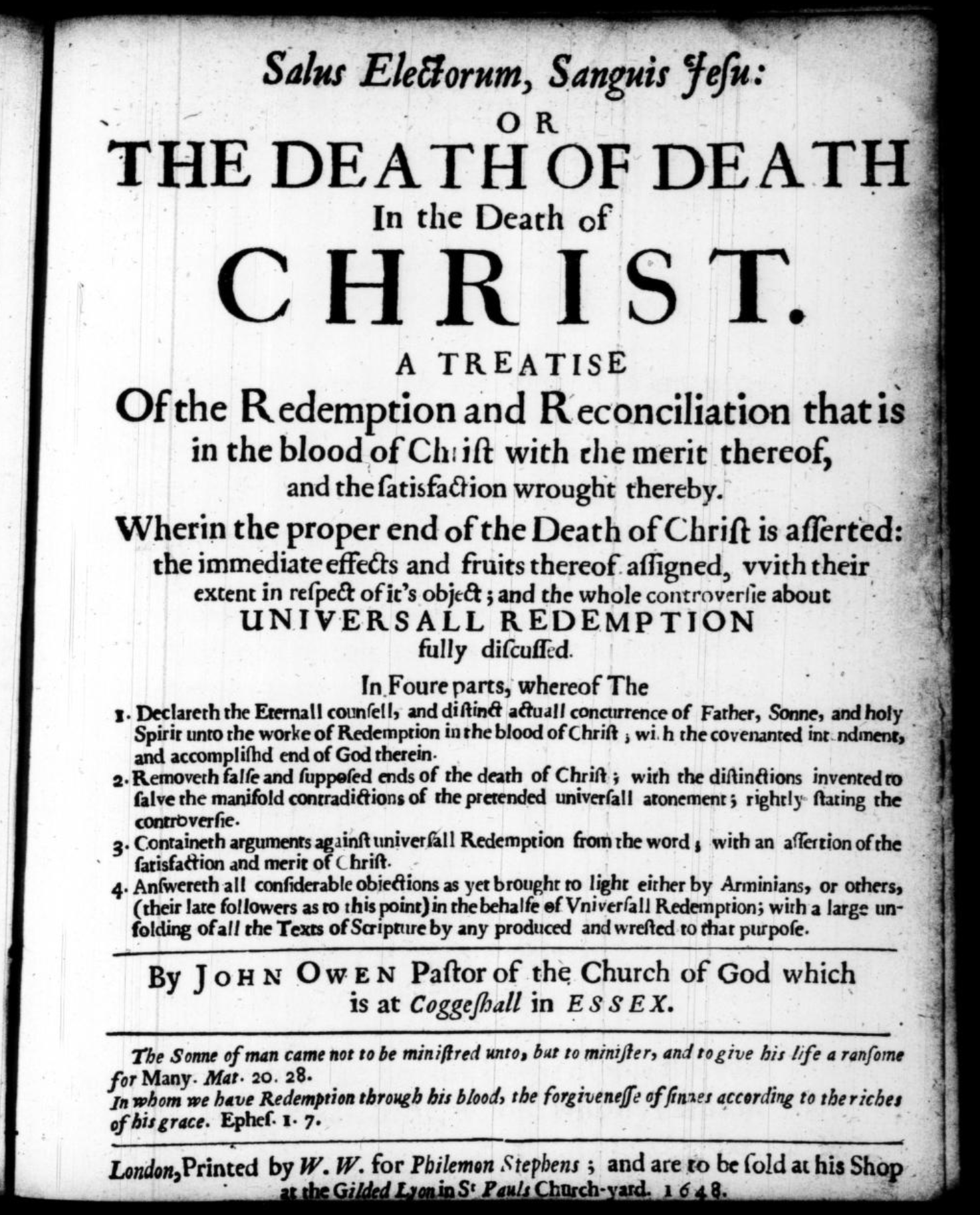
- Author: John Owen
- Language: English
- Subject: Atonement of Christ
- Publisher: Philemon Stephens
- Publication date: 1648
- Publication place: England

Salus Electorum, Sanguis Jesu; or the Death of Death in the Death of Christ is a 1648 book by the English theologian John Owen in which he defends the doctrine of limited atonement against classical Arminianism, Amyraldianism, and the universalism of the 17th-century lay theologian Thomas More.

== Continued arguments between Owen and Baxter ==
Richard Baxter disagreed with Owen, and the following year published a reply, called Aphorisms of Justification. Owen and Baxter continued to exchange views on the subject, and both gained followers for their positions.

== 1959 reprint and influence in modern evangelical circles ==
In 1959, the Banner of Truth Trust republished the book (as simply The Death of Death in the Death of Christ) with an introduction by J. I. Packer. In it, Packer stated that nobody has yet "refuted Owen's proof that [limited atonement] is part of the uniform biblical presentation of redemption". Carl Trueman suggests that this introduction "has probably proved more influential in modern evangelical circles than the text it introduces." On the other hand, Tim Cooper, professor of church history at the University of Otago, argues that Packer's praise is undeserved, and that the book is "weak and unconvincing".
