= Thomas Patrick Moore (footballer) =

Argentine footballer (1872–1934)

Personal information
- Date of birth: August 17, 1872
- Place of birth: Buenos Aires Province, Argentina
- Date of death: September 9, 1934 (aged 62)
- Place of death: Buenos Aires Province, Argentina

Senior career*
| Years | Team | Apps | (Gls) |
- Lobos A.C.
- * Club domestic league appearances and goals

Thomas Patrick Moore (1872–1934) was an Argentine football player, most recognised for his tenure on Lobos Athletic Club.

== Career ==
Moore was born in Marcos Paz, Buenos Aires, the son of a family of Irish roots. He began his career in Lobos, club of which he was founder and the first Captain of the team in 1892. Moore came out twice Runner-up playing for Lobos in 1898 and 1899. Both finals were played against Lomas Athletic Club.

His brothers the twins Juan Jose and Eugenio Moore were part of the Lobos team. Later, were players of the Alumni Athletic Club.
