= Thomas E. Moore =

Founder of American Rescue Workers

- Born: c.1839 London, England
- Died: January 7, 1898; Harper, Kansas, US
- Occupation: Officer of The Salvation Army
- Title: Major

Major Thomas E. Moore (c.1839 - January 7, 1898) was the National Commander of The Salvation Army in the United States. He later split from the Salvation Army and founded the American Rescue Workers, originally called The Salvation Army of America.

== The Salvation Army ==
Moore joined the Salvation Army in London, England, in 1879 after living in the United States for eleven years following the American Civil War. He was accepted as an officer and rose through the ranks becoming a divisional commander for London with the rank of Major. General William Booth sent Moore to the USA in June, 1880, due to his knowledge of the country. In 1881, he arrived in Philadelphia and replaced George Scott Railton as National Commander.

Moore's first action was to consolidate the twelve corps. on paper into five, leaving three in the Philadelphia area. He also withdrew any corps that were created from the Midwest.

== Split From The Salvation Army ==
General Booth believed everything owned by the Salvation Army to be owned by himself under British law. American law in the 1880s required a "person" to hold legal title to everything of value but would not recognize that Booth, a foreigner, could own property across the USA. Moore sought to become a US citizen and incorporate The Salvation Army in the United States so that he personally was not responsible for personally injury. This process began in July, 1883, in New York. A corps in New Brunswick, New Jersey, had incorporated before Moore had which led to Moore's arrest in New Jersey.

Booth, not understanding American law, issued a statement in The War Cry, the Salvation Army's magazine, that the legal foundation of the Army vested "control and direction" of the organization solely in the person of William Booth, that all properties of the Army were to be "conveyed to, and held by, the General". Ultimately, Booth did not want Moore to incorporate. Following his arrest and convinced that incorporation was essential, Moore held a secret meeting with many officers away from Booth and Major Thomas B. Coombs, who was sent by Booth to relieve Moore. Here he declared he was willing to take a new command, even South Africa which he viewed as a demotion but where Booth intended to transfer him if Booth were willing to accept the necessity of incorporation. The vote was 121 to 4 for incorporation and the Salvation Army was incorporated on October 24, 1884. Moore also registered all Salvation Army insignia and copyrighted The War Cry.

Outraged by Moore's 'treason', Booth sent Major Frank Smith to replace Moore as National Commander. Smith set up a rival "loyal" headquarters in New York, issued a "loyal" War Cry, and dismissed the large majority of officers as rebels who still believed Moore to be the National Commander. Many of the corps outside of New York were unaware of the controversy and continued to be loyal to Booth and the international Salvation Army. Moore's army was "The Salvation Army of America" and Moore styled himself as "General". The International Salvation Army then sued in U.S. courts resulting in Moore's Army being renamed to American Rescue Workers.

Moore's Organization suffered from his lack of administrative skills and could not afford to pay rent on its headquarters. This resulted in the board of trustees asking Moore to resign from his position as General in December 1888, and deposing him in January 1889 after he refused. The generalship was then offered to Lieutenant General Milton K Light who remained loyal to Moore before being offered to Colonel Richard Holz, who remained a colonel but took the position. Holz later rejoined the international Salvation Army along with twenty nine other officers on October 16, 1889.

== The Christian Crusaders ==
After Moore left the American Rescue Workers (still called the American Salvation Army until 1913), he and Milton Light started The Christian Crusaders out of twenty corps that were still loyal to Moore in the South and New England. These corps closed one by one. In 1890, Light left the organization after the international Salvation Army opened a corps in Atlanta, Georgia. Moore resigned from his post in 1891 and became a Baptist minister. He died at the pulpit on January 7, 1898, in Harper, Kansas.
