= Charles Hamilton (handwriting expert) =

Handwriting expert

Charles Hamilton, Jr. (December 24, 1913 – December 11, 1996) was an American paleographer, handwriting expert and author of historical works. He invented the term "philography" as another term for his profession. He is the author of a number of books on this topic. He was also an autograph dealer. He died in New York City at the age of 82.

== Early life and studies ==
Hamilton was born in Ludington, Michigan and grew up in Flint, Michigan, and then in Los Angeles. His father was in the lumber business. At the age of twelve he collected his first autograph, which was Rudyard Kipling's. Kipling was well known for refusing requests for autographs, but Hamilton, who had just read The Jungle Book, included a dime for the return postage, and told Kipling that the dime was Hamilton's allowance for carrying out ashes from the furnace. He graduated from Beverly Hills High School, as the valedictorian of his class. He then received a bachelor's degree and a master's degree in English literature from the University of Southern California in Los Angeles. He was a voracious reader of literature and history.

== Career and military ==
In the 1930s he moved to New York City to work in publishing. He enlisted in the United States Army Air Corps in 1942, and during World War II, he won a bronze star and six battle stars. In 1945, after his service, he returned to New York City and began seriously dealing in autographs and manuscripts. He was called upon by the New York City police to consult in a number of notable cases, including the hunt for the Zodiac Killer. In a notable case, he called the so-called Hitler Diaries "patent and obvious forgeries". The British historian who was claiming them to be authentic eventually changed his mind and sided with Hamilton; the forger was unmasked and convicted in 1983.

He dealt with a great many historic documents. He once owned a note that Queen Isabella wrote regarding the jewels she sold to pay for Christopher Columbus' discovery of the New World. He owned the first draft of the Bill of Rights, and a letter written by Jesse James but signed with his pseudonym, Thomas Howard. He owned another letter penned by Queen Victoria with advice for an unwed mother: "Let her wear a ring and no one need be the wiser". He is also credited with resolving a great number of questions regarding frauds and forgeries.

== Methods ==
In his book, In Search of Shakespeare; A Reconnaissance into the Poet’s Life and Handwriting, Hamilton describes what is needed to be a professional handwriting expert: Knowledge of history and literature; as well as in watermarks, ink and paper; and above all in the handwriting of noted persons in all areas; as well as the ability to read difficult scripts, to accurately judge the authenticity of documents, and to recognize forgeries. According to Hamilton, accuracy is essential because a professional handwriting expert's opinions will often be tested in a court of law. Talent, Hamilton states, may be partly instinct, but it will also be the "result of decades of daily experience in the examination of old handwriting".

== Shakespeare ==
He is noted for his work in studying the handwriting and documents regarding William Shakespeare. In his book, In Search of Shakespeare; A Reconnaissance into the Poet’s Life and Handwriting, he considers that Shakespeare's will was written in the playwright's own handwriting or "holographic". He also considers the handwritten evidence that three pages inserted into the play Sir Thomas More, and the drafts of the applications for the Shakespeare coat-of-arms are also in Shakespeare's handwriting. Hamilton presents charts and examples that compare the handwriting in each document.

Hamilton has said that in his Shakespeare studies his essays and ideas all begin with his observations of handwriting. He has drawn some interest, and also has his critics. Gary Taylor has said that Hamilton is a considerable paleographer, but some of his views on Shakespeare are controversial and "too recent to have been subjected to thorough scholarly scrutiny."

== Hofmann forgery ==
In 1983, Hamilton certified as genuine a letter purportedly by Joseph Smith that was forged by Mark Hofmann and sold to Gordon B. Hinckley, a member of the First Presidency of the Church of Jesus Christ of Latter-day Saints.

== Books ==
Among his 17 published books are:

- Collecting Autographs and Manuscripts (1962)
- The Signature of America: A Fresh Look at Famous Handwriting (1979)
- Great Forgers and Famous Fakes (1980)
- American Autographs (1983)
- Hamilton, Charles (1996). Leaders & personalities of the Third Reich: their biographies, portraits, and autographs. Vol. 1. San Jose, Calif.: R.J. Bender Pub. ISBN 0-912138-27-0. LCCN 97162094.
- The Hitler Diaries: Fakes That Fooled the World (1991)
- In Search of Shakespeare; A Reconnaissance into the Poet’s Life and Handwriting (1991)
- Shakespeare, William; Fletcher, John (1994). Hamilton, Charles (ed.). Cardenio, or, The second maiden's tragedy. Lakewood, Colorado: Glenbridge Publishing Ltd. ISBN 0-944435-24-6. LCCN 93073354.
- Leaders & Personalities of the Third Reich, Vol. 2 (1996), R. James Bender Publishing. ISBN 0-912138-66-1
- Hamilton, Charles (1968). Scribblers & scoundrels. New York: P. S. Eriksson. ISBN 1-299-74672-1. LCCN 67027017. OCLC 1036856942.
