= Thomas More (weaver) =

Thomas More was a 17th-century weaver and lay theologian who lived near Wisbech. He is known for his 1646 book The Universality of God’s Free Grace in Christ to Mankind, in which he advocated universal redemption.

More's work produced a flurry of responses, including A refutation of the loose opinions, and licentious Tenets wherewith those Lay-preachers which wander up and down the kingdom, labour to seduce the simple People. Or, an examination and confutation of the erroneous doctrines of Thomas More, late a weaver in Wells near Wisbich, in his book (The universality of Gods free grace in Christ to mankind) by Thomas Whitfield (1646) and The Universalist examined and convicted, destitute of plaine Sayings of Scripture, or Evidence of Reason. In Answer to a Treatise entitled "The Universality of Gods free Grace in Christ to Mankind" by Obadiah Howe (1648). John Owen then used More as a major sparring partner in his 1648 work, The Death of Death in the Death of Christ. According to J. I. Packer, Owen had selected the book "as the fullest statement of the case for universal redemption that had yet appeared in English and uses it unmercifully as a chopping-block."
