= Edward Maunde Thompson =

British paleographer (1840–1929)

Sir Edward Maunde Thompson GCB FBA
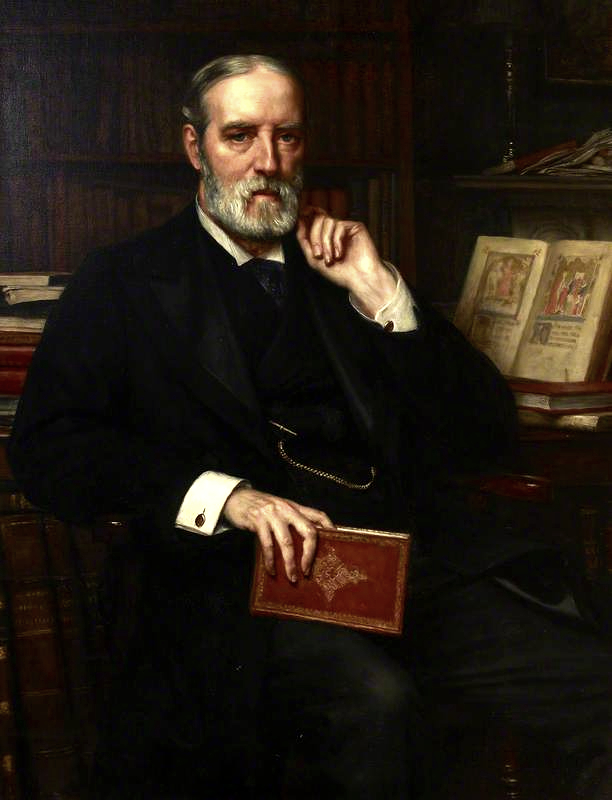
- 1909 portrait of Sir Edward Maunde Thompson by Edward John Poynter
- Born: 4 May 1840
- Died: 14 September 1929 (aged 89)
- Burial place: Brookwood Cemetery, Surrey, England
- Education: Rugby School; University College, Oxford
- Occupations: Paleographer, museum director
- Spouse: Georgiana Susanna McKenzie (m. 1864)
- Children: 4
- Awards: Knight Grand Cross of the Order of the Bath (1895)

Sir Edward Maunde Thompson GCB FBA (4 May 1840 – 14 September 1929) was a British palaeographer and Principal Librarian and first director of the British Museum.

He is noted for his handbook of Greek and Latin palaeography and for his study of William Shakespeare's handwriting in the manuscript of the play Sir Thomas More.

== Biography ==
Thompson was born in Jamaica, where his father, Edward Thompson, was Custos of Clarendon Parish. His mother was Eliza Hayhurst Poole, also of Clarendon. He was educated at Rugby and matriculated at University College, Oxford in 1859. He was called to the bar at the Middle Temple in 1867.

Thompson was made Keeper of the Manuscripts at the British Museum in 1878. He served as Director and Principal Librarian of the British Museum from 1888 to 1909. He set high standards for the staff of the museum, and worked hard to improve the accessibility of the collections to the public. He secured premises at Hendon to house the museum's newspaper collection.

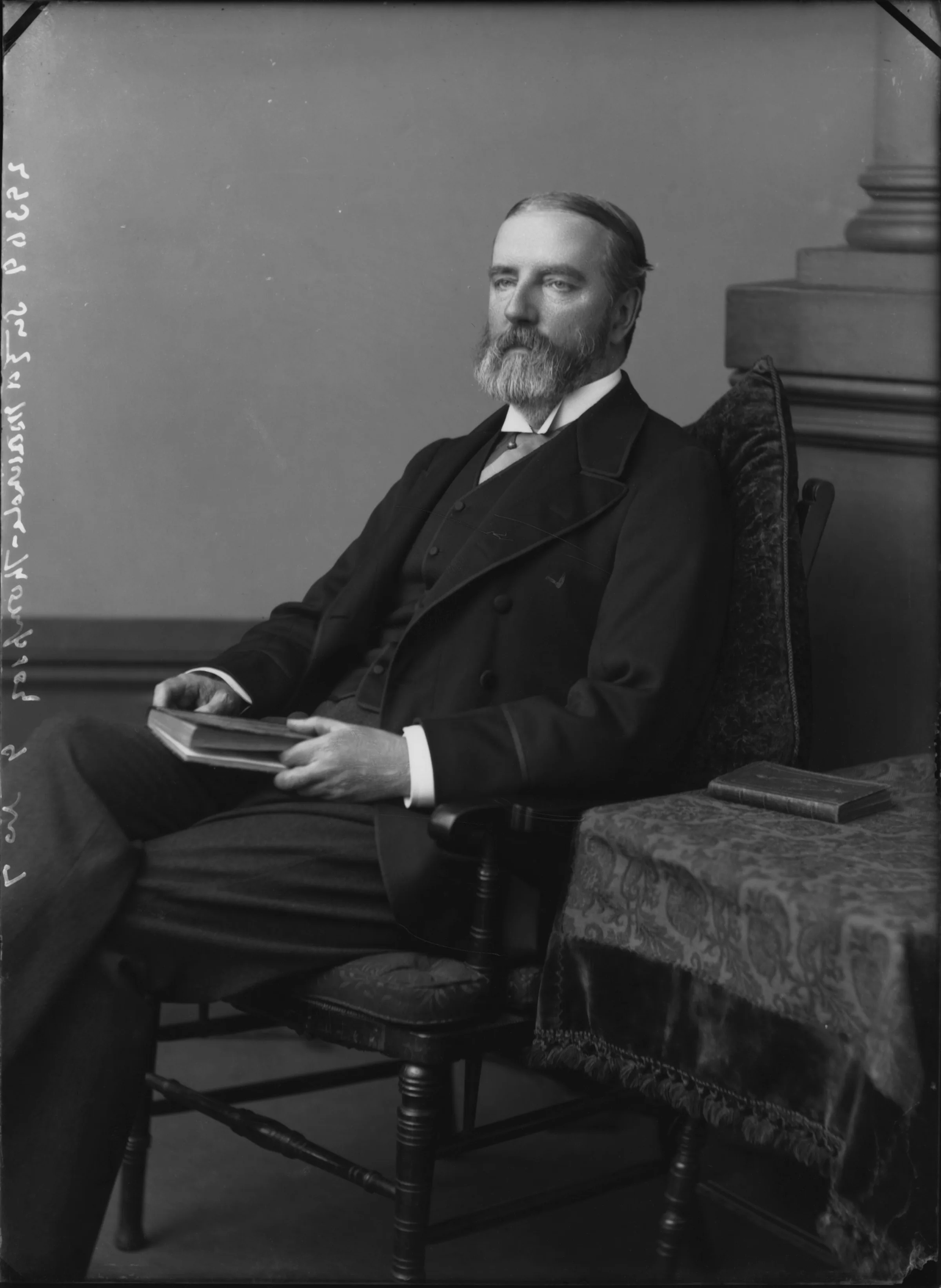
Sir E. M. Thompson in 1899. Photograph by Alexander Bassano

The photographic facsimile of Codex Alexandrinus was issued under his supervision in 1879 and 1880. He was a founding member of the British Academy in 1901, and served as its second President (1907–09).

He retired from the British Museum in August 1909 due to ill health.

In 1916, he published his palaeographic study of the three-page addition to the manuscript of Sir Thomas More, arguing that the three pages in "Hand D" were in Shakespeare's autograph. In 1923, he contributed to the definitive study Shakespeare's Hand in the Play of Sir Thomas More, with Alfred W. Pollard, W. W. Greg, John Dover Wilson, and R. W. Chambers.

Maunde Thompson is buried in Brookwood Cemetery.

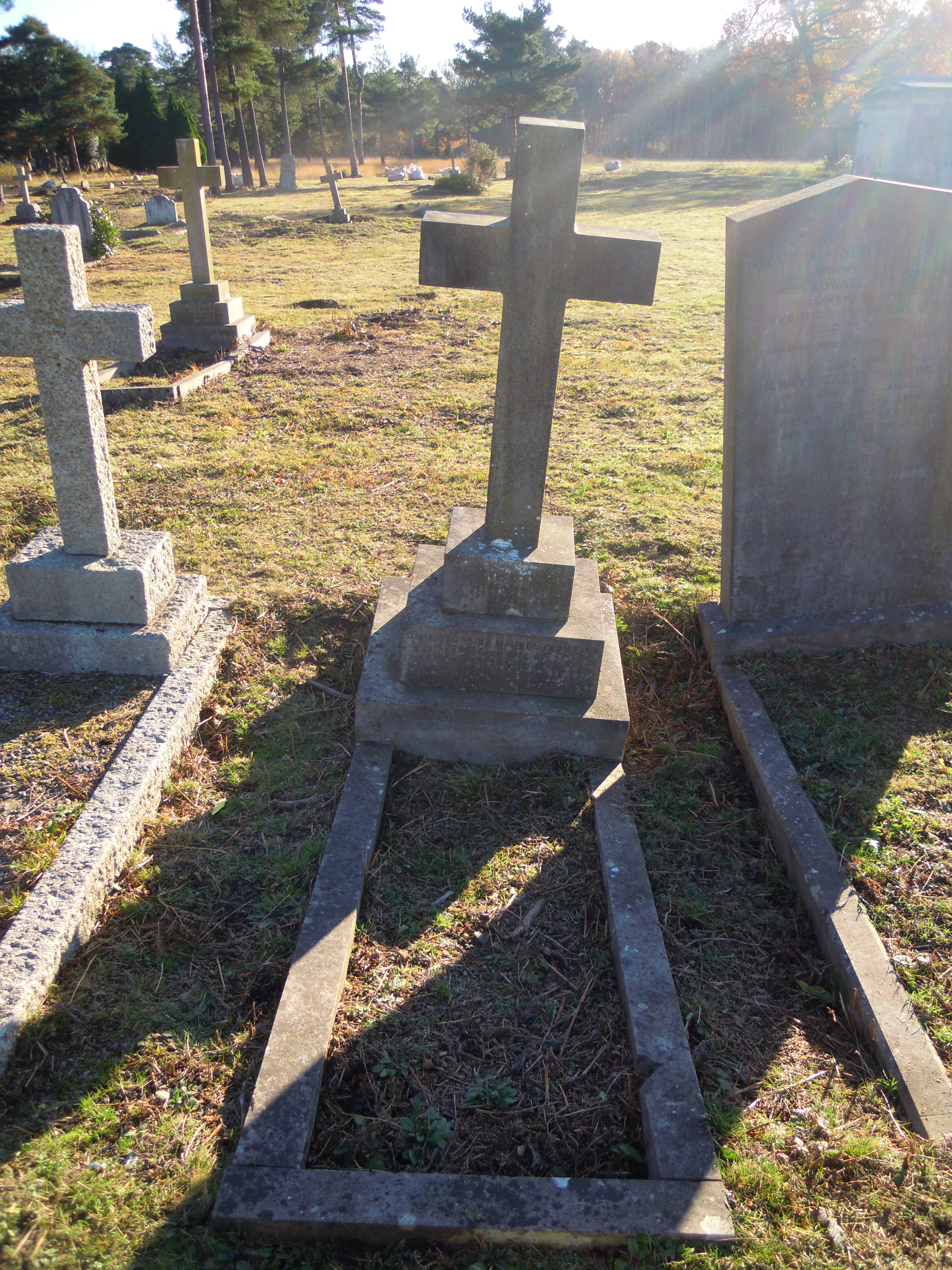
Thompson's grave in Brookwood Cemetery

== Awards ==
Maunde Thompson was knighted in 1895. He received honorary degrees from Oxford, Durham, St. Andrews and Manchester Universities, and was an honorary fellow of University College, Oxford.

== Legacy ==
At Maunde Thompson's request, the portrait of him painted in 1909 by Edward John Poynter was transferred to the British Museum. The Acquisition Notes of 13 May 1917 stating: "You will remember that it was understood that my portrait was eventually to return to the Museum, to have the honour of hanging among those of greater men. I am giving up my house here – and shall be a wanderer for a time. It will not do to risk damage to the picture, and I should therefore propose to transfer it at once to your care if the Trustees approve."

== Bibliography ==
- English illuminated manuscripts (London: Kegan Paul, Trench, Trübner, 1895)
- Introduction to Greek and Latin Palaeography, Oxford: Clarendon Press, 1912.
- Facsimiles of Ancient Manuscripts, London: Oxford University Press, 1913–30.
- Shakespeare's Handwriting: A Study, Oxford: Clarendon Press, 1916.

== Family ==
In 1864, Thompson married Georgiana Susanna McKenzie, daughter of George McKenzie of Fairfield, from an old Scots-Jamaican family. They had one daughter and three sons.
