= Sir Thomas More (play) =

Elizabethan play likely worked on by Shakespeare

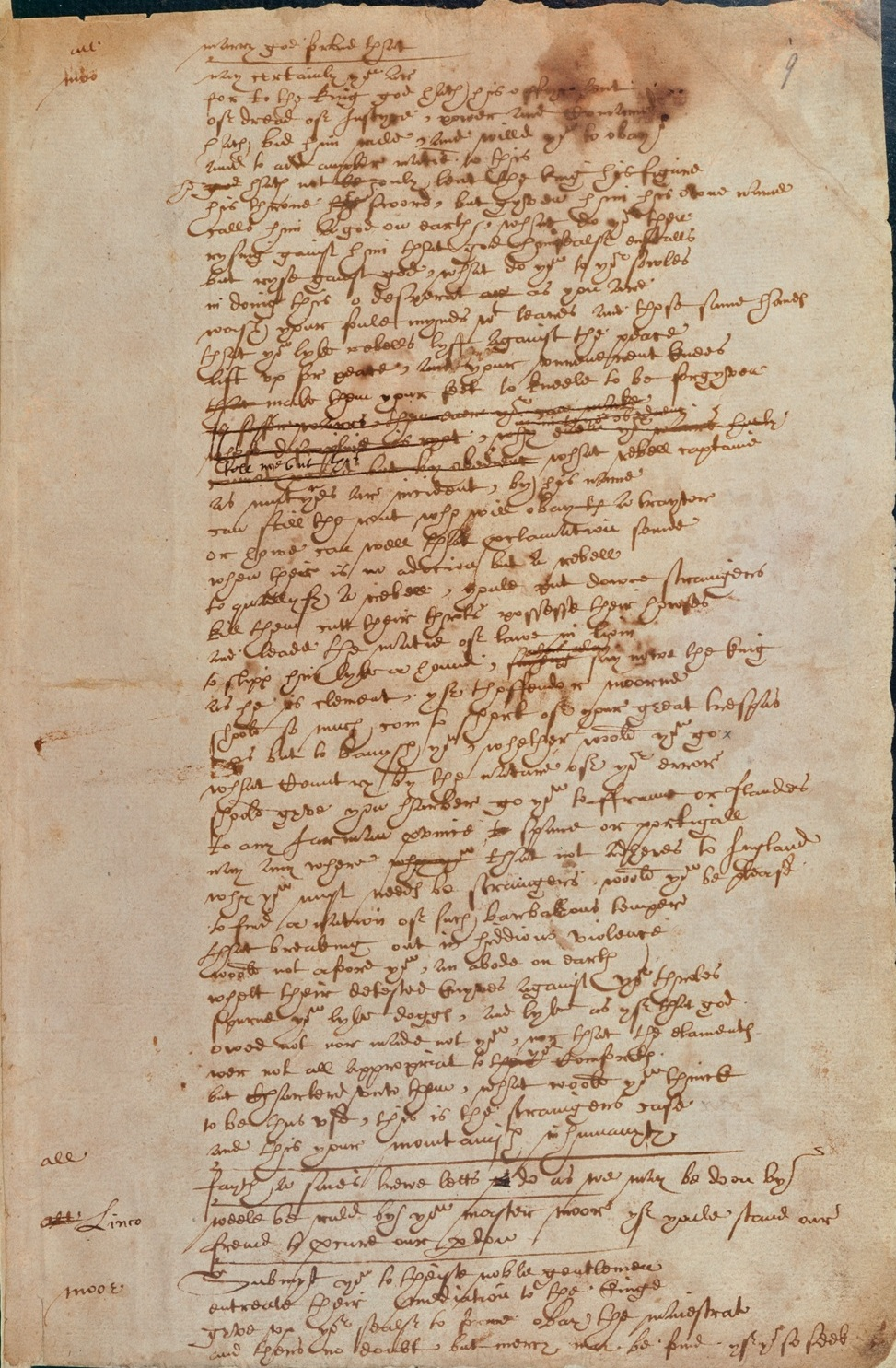
- Photo of a page written by 'Hand D' (thought to be William Shakespeare)
- Original language: Early Modern English
- Written by: Originally written by Anthony Munday and Henry Chettle; later heavily revised by Thomas Heywood, Thomas Dekker and William Shakespeare
- Characters: Thomas More; Earl of Shrewsbury; Roger Cholmeley; Thomas Palmer; John Mundy; William Roper
- Subject: xenophobia, law and order, church and state
- Genre: English Renaissance theatre, History play
- Setting: England, 1517–1535

Premiere
- Date: c. 1591–93
- Place: The Rose, London

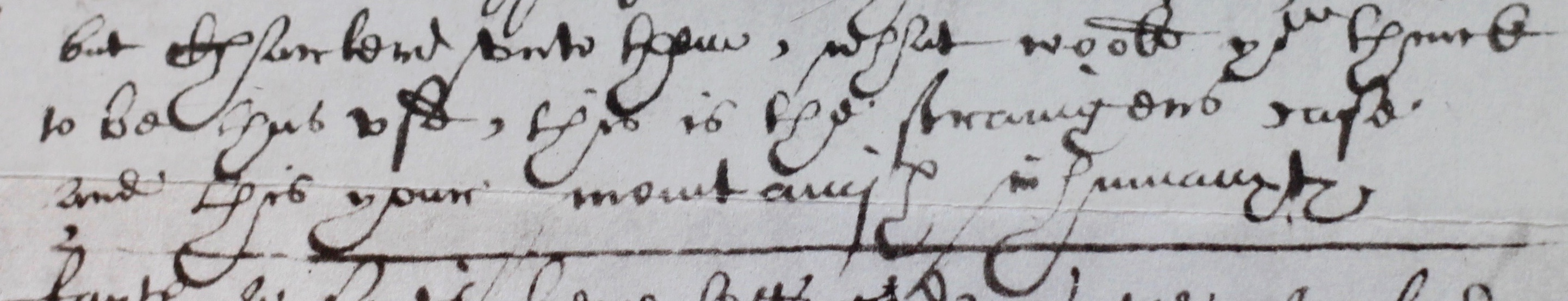
Three lines in the addition by Hand D: "but chartered unto them? What would you think / To be thus used? This is the stranger's case, / And this your mountanish inhumanity"

Sir Thomas More is an Elizabethan play and a dramatic biography based on events in the life of the Catholic martyr Thomas More, who rose to become the Lord Chancellor of England during the reign of Henry VIII. The play is considered to be written by Anthony Munday and Henry Chettle and revised by several writers. The manuscript is particularly notable for a three-page handwritten revision now widely attributed to William Shakespeare.

== Content ==
This play is not a biography; it is a drama that deals with certain events in More's life. Other significant facts are not described: there is no mention of his literary career, his book Utopia, or the dispute between Henry VIII and Pope Clement VII. The life of Sir Thomas More is at times dramatized, with certain events altered or expanded beyond historical sources for theatrical purposes. The play centers on themes of obedience to the crown, the rule of law, and the populace’s xenophobic anger. More is faced with King Henry VIII’s demand to recognize the monarch as the supreme head of the newly established Anglican Church. When he refuses to sign the required oath, he is tried for high treason and ultimately executed, becoming a martyr to his principles.

There are three primary actions in the drama: First is the uprising of 1517 known as Ill May Day and More's quelling of the rioters. Second is the portrayal of More's private life, his family and friendships, demonstrating his generosity, kindness, and wit. Third is his service as Privy Councillor and Lord Chancellor, and the principled stand he took in opposition to the king, which leads to More's execution.

The particular articles More refuses to sign are never described, so the play avoids the specific conflict that occurred between the Catholic Church and the breakaway English church, allowing the story to focus on the issue of freedom of an individual conscience from worldly authority. This explains why Munday, who fought against the Catholic Church, would be an author of a play that vindicates More, a Catholic martyr. Munday's abiding interest, as demonstrated in his other plays, was in speaking out against attacks on an individual's freedom, attacks that came from both church and state.

Considered in terms of theatrical performance, it is seen as effective and dramatic in the scenes dealing with the rioting, it is warm and human when dealing with More's private life, and it is sympathetic and admiring as More sticks to his principles in the conclusion of the play. Charles Forker and Joseph Candido consider the work to be the best of the dramatic biographies of the era. Even with these qualities it would not have attracted as much later interest if it were not for the association this play has with Shakespeare.

== Characters ==
Sir Thomas More has an unusually high total of 59 speaking parts, including 22 in the first 500 lines of the play; this, plus crowd scenes, would have taxed the ability of any playing company of the time to stage it. The job could only be managed through complex doubling and more-than-doubling of roles by the actors. Out of necessity, the play is structured to allow for this multiple doubling of roles: it is set up in three phases—More's rise; More's Chancellorship; More's fall—with very limited overlap between the thirds. Only three characters, More himself and the Earls of Shrewsbury and Surrey, appear in all three portions; seven other characters—Lady More, Clown Betts, Palmer, Roper, Sergeant Downes, the Lord Mayor, and a sheriff—appear in two of the three segments.

- Thomas More – undersheriff of London; later Sir Thomas More and Lord Chancellor

In London

- Earl of Shrewsbury
- Earl of Surrey – characterised as Henry Howard, Earl of Surrey, but historically the events depicted involved his father, Thomas, Duke of Norfolk
- John Lincoln – broker (the only executed rioter named in Holinshed's Chronicles)
- Williamson – carpenter (a conflation of two citizens mentioned in Holinshed)
- Doll – Williamson's wife
- George Betts – rioter
- Clown Betts – Ralph, his brother (Holinshed mentions two brothers named "Bets" who were sentenced to death but pardoned)
- Sherwin – goldsmith (mentioned in Holinshed as sentenced to death but pardoned)
- Francis de Barde – a Lombard (Lombard banking was common in London)
- Cavaler – a Lombard or a Frenchman, associated with de Barde
- Lord Mayor of London – historically John Rest
- Justice Suresby – magistrate
- Lifter – cutpurse
- Smart – plaintiff against Lifter (non-speaking role)
- Recorder

In Court

- Sir Thomas Palmer – soldier and friend to King Henry VIII
- Sir Roger Chomley – historically the Lieutenant of the Tower, but portrayed in the play as a member of the Council
- Sir John Munday – an alderman
- Downes – Sergeant-at-Arms to the King who is injured in the riots
- Crofts – messenger
- Randall – More's servant
- Morris – secretary to the Bishop of Winchester
- Jack Falconer – Morris' servant
- Erasmus – Renaissance humanist and Catholic priest

Lord Cardinal's Players

- Inclination
- Prologue
- Wit
- Lady Vanity
- Luggins

More's Party

- Lady More – More's wife; historically his second wife, Alice Middleton
- William Roper – More's son-in-law
- Roper's wife – More's daughter
- More's other daughter – either Elizabeth (b. 1506), Cicely (b. 1507), or his stepdaughter, Alice
- Catesby – More's steward
- Gough – More's secretary
- Dr. Fisher, Bishop of Rochester

Others

- Lieutenant of the Tower of London
- Gentleman Porter of the Tower
- Three Warders of the Tower
- Hangman
- A poor woman – a client of More
- More's Servants – Ned Butler, Robin Brewer, Giles Porter, and Ralph Horse-Keeper
- Two Sheriffs
- Messengers
- Clerk of the Council
- Officers, Justices, Rioters, Citizens, City Guard, Attendants, Serving-men, Lords, Ladies, Aldermen, Lords of the Council, Prentices

== Synopsis ==
=== Act I ===
The play dramatises events in More's life, and it deals with issues of obedience to the crown and rule of law, particularly when a populace has become stirred up in an anti-alien fervour. It consists of 17 scenes, four of them cancelled. It begins with the Ill May Day events of 1517: Foreign nationals, who have immigrated to England from Lombardy, which is the northern region of what is now known as Italy, are misbehaving in a variety of ways, and are treating the citizens of London with abuse and disrespect. This is outraging the workers of London, who decide to join together on May Day and seek revenge on the newcomers. London noblemen are having difficulty deciding what to do about this, when rioting breaks out all across London, and even the Mayor of London is endangered. The noblemen decide to engage Sheriff Thomas More, who is popular and respected by the people, to try and calm the civil unrest.

=== Act II ===
A group of native Londoners plan to set fire to the foreigners' homes. Others urge a military response. More decides the best way is for him to speak to the rioters.

More arrives at St. Martin's gate. The rioters express their complaints, then agree to hear from More. More begins by saying that the riots are disgracing England, and that if disorder prevails, civil society will fall apart, and none of the rioters will live to an old age. He tells them that when they rebel against the law, they rebel against God. More offers a deal to the rioters: If they will behave, and go to prison in peace, he promises that they will be given a pardon. The only other option for them is death. The rioters accept More's offer, and are taken away.

=== Act III ===
The rioters are about to be hanged. One of their leaders, Lincoln, has already been executed. Then Surrey arrives to announce that the execution order has been stayed by order of the King, because More has pleaded for their lives.

=== Act IV ===
More is knighted and promoted to Privy Councilor for his role in ending the riots.

At home, More is visited by his friend, the Dutch philosopher and theologian, Erasmus. More then hosts a visit by the Mayor of London. For the guests' entertainment, a play is performed, The Marriage of Wit and Wisdom.

Later in Whitehall, the Privy Council, including More, is meeting, when Sir Thomas Palmer enters with undisclosed articles from the King, King Henry VIII, who wants them signed. More refuses to sign, because he is conscientiously opposed. Rochester, who also refuses to sign, is taken away to the Tower of London. More resigns his office and is placed under house arrest. His fellow Privy Councilors urge him to change his mind and sign, but he will not.

More goes home and informs his family. He discusses the situation and how it will affect them, and he comforts them, all the while maintaining a positive demeanor and his moral position. The Earls of Surrey and Shrewsbury arrive to encourage More to sign the articles; he will not and is taken away to the Tower.

=== Act V ===
Catesby goes to More's house to inform the family that More has been sentenced to death.

More's family arrives at the Tower on the eve of his execution. They urge him to change his mind, but he is resolute. The next day, on Tower Hill, More is positive and resolved as he mounts the scaffold and prepares to die by beheading. More has thoughtful and considerate exchanges with the noblemen, who are present, and his executioner, and then is taken off-stage to his fate.

== Manuscript ==
The original manuscript, involving so many revisions, has led to the view that the play has been pieced together or is in poor condition. However, the revisions are generally considered, in recognizable theatrical terms, as a script's natural progression towards its being readied for production.

The original manuscript is a handwritten text, now owned by the British Library. The manuscript is notable for the light it sheds on the collaborative nature of Elizabethan drama and theatrical censorship of the era.

Now Harley MS 7368 in the collection of the British Library, the manuscript's provenance can be traced back to 1728, when it belonged to a London book collector named John Murray. He donated it to the collection of Edward Harley, 3rd Earl of Oxford and Earl Mortimer, who bequeathed it to the British Museum with the rest of his manuscript collection in 1753. Some time between 1728 and 1753 the play was bound with another manuscript, The Humorous Lovers.

Now in poor condition, the original manuscript probably consisted of 16 leaves—31 handwritten pages of a working draft of the play (foul papers), with the last page blank. Two or three of the original leaves have been torn out, and seven leaves and two smaller pieces of paper have been inserted.

Aside from folios 1 and 2, the wrapper of the manuscript proper, the revised extant manuscript comprises the following:

1) Folios 3–5, Hand S: the first three scenes of the play, through page 5a; censored by Edmund Tylney, the Master of the Revels, but otherwise intact. On page 5b, all text after the first 16 lines is marked for deletion. At least one, and probably two, of the leaves immediately following (the original leaves 6 and 7) are missing.

2) Folio 6, Addition I, Hand A: a single leaf, written on only one side. The addition is misplaced, and belongs later in the play, with page 19a.
3) Folios 7–9, Addition II: three leaves replacing the excised material on 5b and the original 6 and probable 7. Each of the three leaves is in a different hand.

- Folio 7a, Addition IIa, Hand B: a scene to replace a short deleted scene on 5b.
- Folio 7b, Addition IIb, Hand C: another complete scene, with stage directions leading to its successor.
- Folios 8–9, Addition IIc, Hand D: a three-page scene (page 9b being blank), with about a dozen corrections in Hand C.

4) Folios 10–11, Hand S: back to the original manuscript, though with some insertions on pages 10a and 11a in Hand B.

5) Folio 11c, Addition III, Hand C: the first of the two insertions on smaller pieces of paper, formerly pasted over the bottom of page 11b, and consisting of a single 21-line soliloquy meant to begin the next scene.

6) Folios 12–13, Addition IV, Hands C and E: four pages to replace excised or cancelled material, written mainly in Hand C but with input from Hand E on page 13b.

7) Folio 14a Hand S: the original again, and the whole page cancelled for deletion. Addition IV, directly previous, replaces this material.

8) Folio 14c, Addition V, Hand C: the second of the insertions on smaller sheets of paper, formerly pasted over the bottom of page 14a.

9) Folios 14b and 15, Hand S: the original again.

10) Folio 16, Addition VI, Hand B: the last of the six Additions.

11) Folios 17–22a, Hand S: the conclusion of the play in the original version. On page 19a a long passage is cut, and this is the place where the mislocated Addition I, folio 6, actually belongs.

Hand C attempted to provide corrections to the whole, enhancing its coherence; yet some stage directions and speech prefixes are missing, and the stage directions that exist are sometimes incorrect. (In Additions III and IV, More speaks his soliloquy before he enters.)

Scholars, critics, and editors have described the text as "chaotic" and "reduced to incoherence", but in 1987 Scott McMillin maintained that the play could be acted as is; and at least one production of the play has ensued, by the Royal Shakespeare Company in 2005.

The manuscript was first printed and published in 1844, two and a half centuries after it was written, by the Shakespeare Society, edited by Alexander Dyce; and again in 1911 by the Malone Society, edited by W. W. Greg.

Part of the need for revisions of the play was clearly due to purely practical concerns of stagecraft, apart from the demands of political censorship. Much of the point of the revision was to streamline the play, to make it more actable; though even the revised version would have needed a minimum cast of 13–18 adults and five boys. Two of the Additions, III and VI, occur at the beginning and end of the middle third respectively, giving more time for costume changes. Addition III provides a soliloquy by More and a 45-line dialogue between two actors; Addition VI provides a similar breathing-space for the actors to get ready for the play's final phase.

Allowing for a range of uncertainties, it is most likely true that the original text of Sir Thomas More was written c. 1591–93, with a special focus on 1592–93 when the subject of hostility against "aliens" was topical in London. Edmund Tylney censored the play when it was submitted to him for approval at that time, for this topicality as well as for more general considerations of controlling political expression on the stage. The effort at revision is difficult to date; many scholars have favoured c. 1596, though a date as late as c. 1604 is also possible.

== Authorship ==
The manuscript is a complicated text containing many layers of collaborative writing, revision, and censorship. Scholars of the play think that it was originally written by playwrights Anthony Munday and Henry Chettle and some years later heavily revised by another team of playwrights, including Thomas Heywood, Thomas Dekker, and William Shakespeare.

The most common identifications for the six hands:

- HAND S – Anthony Munday, the original manuscript;
- HAND A – Henry Chettle;
- HAND B – Thomas Heywood;
- HAND C – A professional scribe who copied out a large section of the play;
- HAND D – William Shakespeare;
- HAND E – Thomas Dekker.

Munday, Chettle, Dekker, and Heywood wrote for the Admiral's Men during the years before and after 1600, which may strengthen the idea of a connection between the play and that company. Shakespeare, in this context, seems the odd man out. In his study of the play, Scott McMillin entertains the possibility that Shakespeare's contribution might have been part of the original text from the early 1590s, when Shakespeare may have written for the Lord Strange's Men.

=== Evidence for Shakespeare's contribution ===
In 1871, Richard Simpson proposed that some additions to the play had been written by Shakespeare, and a year later James Spedding, editor of the works of Sir Francis Bacon, while rejecting some of Simpson's suggestions, supported the attribution to Shakespeare of the passage credited to Hand D. In 1916, the paleographer Sir Edward Maunde Thompson published a minute analysis of the handwriting of the addition and judged it to be Shakespeare's. The case was strengthened with the publication of Shakespeare's Hand in the Play of Sir Thomas More (1923) by five noted scholars who analysed the play from multiple perspectives, all of which led to the same affirmative conclusion. A second significant gathering of scholars to consider Sir Thomas More grew out of a seminar that was held during the meeting of the Shakespeare Association of America at Ashland, Oregon in 1983. It resulted in a second book of essays, eight by eight different authors, that was published as Shakespeare and Sir Thomas More; Essays on the Play and its Shakespearean Interest. It is a comprehensive study of the manuscript, and states that it appears more likely than ever that Shakespeare did indeed contribute to the revision of this play. This would make it the only surviving manuscript text written by Shakespeare. Although some dissenters remain, the attribution has been generally accepted since the mid-20th century and most authoritative editions of Shakespeare's works, including The Oxford Shakespeare, include the play. It was performed with Shakespeare's name included amongst the authors by the Royal Shakespeare Company in 2005. The issue was supported and disputed over a long period on the evidence of literary style and Shakespeare's distinctive handwriting. The lines in Hand D "are now generally accepted as the work of Shakespeare." If the Shakespearean identification is correct, these three pages represent the only surviving examples of Shakespeare's handwriting, aside from a few signatures on documents. The manuscript, with its numerous corrections, deletions and insertions, enables us to glimpse Shakespeare in the process of composition.

The evidence for identifying Shakespeare as Hand D is of various types:

- Handwriting similar to the six existing signatures of Shakespeare;
- Spellings characteristic of Shakespeare;
- Stylistic elements similar to Shakespeare's acknowledged works.

The original perceptions of Simpson and Spedding in 1871–72 were based on literary style and content and political outlook, rather than palaeographic and orthographic considerations. Consider one example of what attracted attention to the style of Hand D.

First, from Sir Thomas More, Addition IIc, 84–87:

For other ruffians, as their fancies wrought,
With self same hand, self reasons, and self right,
Would shark on you, and men like ravenous fishes
Would feed on one another.

Next, from Coriolanus, I, i, 184–188:

What's the matter,

That in these several places of the city
You cry against the noble Senate, who
(Under the gods) keep you in awe, which else
Would feed on one another?

Thirdly, Troilus and Cressida, I, iii, 121–124:

And appetite, an universal wolf
(So doubly seconded with will and power)
Must make perforce an universal prey,
And last eat up himself.

Finally, Pericles, Prince of Tyre, II, i, 26–32:

3rd Fisherman:...Master, I marvel how the fishes live in the sea.
1st Fisherman: Why, as men do a-land; the great ones eat up
the little ones. I can compare our rich misers to nothing so fitly
as to a whale: 'a plays and tumbles, driving the poor fry before him,
and at last devour them all at a mouthful.

Many features like this in the Hand D addition to Sir Thomas More first attracted the attention of Shakespeare scholars and readers, and led to more intensive study from a range of specialised perspectives.

The British Library designates 147 lines of the playscript as "Shakespeare's only surviving literary manuscript"; curator Zoe Wilcox argued that "all the evidence suggested the writing was by the hand of Shakespeare.".

In 2016, professional paleographer Michael Hays presented a rebuttal of the identification of Shakespeare with Hand D. Published in Shakespeare Quarterly, Hays wrote, "The history of the paleographic argument connecting Sir Thomas More and Shakespeare is a narrative of ambiguous terms, misconceptions, and mistakes." He went on to write that the arguments presented were without scientific merit because there exists no control sample of Shakespeare's writing. Paul Werstine similarly argues that "the only handwriting that we know for certain are his... is too small a sample size to make any sort of reliable comparison."

=== Audience perception ===
Audiences "find that the play speaks with more urgency" in the pages attributed to Shakespeare. While Shakespeare's supposed contribution is consistent with the overall theme and develops the plot, there is an impression of a virtuoso piece inserted, but not completely integrated, into the play. Some editors go as far as to question whether Shakespeare had read any of the other contributions at all.

== Performance history ==
The play was most likely written to be acted by Lord Strange's Men, the only company of the time that could have mounted such a large and demanding production, at Philip Henslowe's Rose Theatre, which possessed the special staging requirements (large-capacity second-level platform and special enclosure) called for by the play. The massive lead role of More, 800-plus lines, was designed for Edward Alleyn, the only actor up to that time who is known to have played such large-scale roles. After the re-organization of the playing companies in 1594, the manuscript may well have passed into the possession of the Admiral's Men.

Whether or not the play was performed in the Elizabethan or Jacobean age is unsettled, and there are indications to support both sides of the question. By the nature of the revisions and the mention of the actor Thomas Goodale in 3.1 it is clear that it was written for the public stage. Since that time no recorded performance of Sir Thomas More took place until a three-night student production by the Birkbeck College, University of London, in December 1922. The play was staged with more than 40 students at the King's School, Canterbury, 4–6 November 1938, with P. D. V. Strallen in the title role. The first known professional staging of the play was 22–29 June 1954 at the London Theatre Centre for the Advance Players Association. It was first performed in Elizabethan costumes and then in modern dress, with Michael Beint as More.

The play has been infrequently revived since, with Ian McKellen playing the title role at the Nottingham Playhouse 10 June–4 July 1964, taking over from John Neville on short notice, when the latter had artistic differences with director Frank Dunlop during rehearsals.

Nigel Cooke played More for the Royal Shakespeare Company in 2005.

Sir Thomas More has also been acted in whole or in part several times as a radio play, twice by the BBC Third Programme (1948, 1956), by the Austrian public radio ORF in 1960, and then again by BBC Radio 3 in 1983.

Sir Ian McKellen later performed the Hand D "The Stranger's Case" monologue on the Marc Maron podcast in 2015, as well as during his visit to the Oxford Union in 2017, glossing before each reading the text's "strangers" as "immigrants". In February 2026, McKellen performed the monologue once more to close out an appearance on The Late Show with Stephen Colbert, this time in the context of the ongoing protests against ICE in Minneapolis.

== See also ==
- A Man for All Seasons – a modern play about Sir Thomas More
