= Gilbert Shakespeare =

Brother of William Shakespeare

Gilbert Shakespeare's signature witnessing a deed dated 5 March 1610.

Gilbert Shakespeare (baptised 13 October 1566, buried probably 3 February 1612) was an English haberdasher, and a younger brother of playwright and poet William Shakespeare. His name is found in local records of Stratford-upon-Avon and London.

== Life ==
Gilbert's father, John Shakespeare, was a glover living in Henley Street, Stratford, and an alderman of the town from 1564. Gilbert may have been named after Gilbert Bradley, also a glover, who lived on the same street and who in 1565 was one of the capital burgesses of Stratford. He was baptized at Holy Trinity church on 13 October 1566.

Gilbert contracted and survived the plague. A single surviving signature shows him to have been literate, and he most likely attended the free school in Stratford along with his brother William. It is possible that around 1578 both boys were removed from school to help their father and his struggling business. For seven years he was 'off the grid', and some people claim that he fled to escape his punishments for deer poaching. This time was known as 'Shakespeare's lost years'.

In London, Gilbert Shakespeare was a haberdasher, a seller of needlework supplies such as thread, needles, and ribbons, living in the parish of St Bride's. In 1597 he and a shoemaker stood surety for £19 bail for William Sampson, a Stratford clockmaker, in the Court of Queen's Bench.

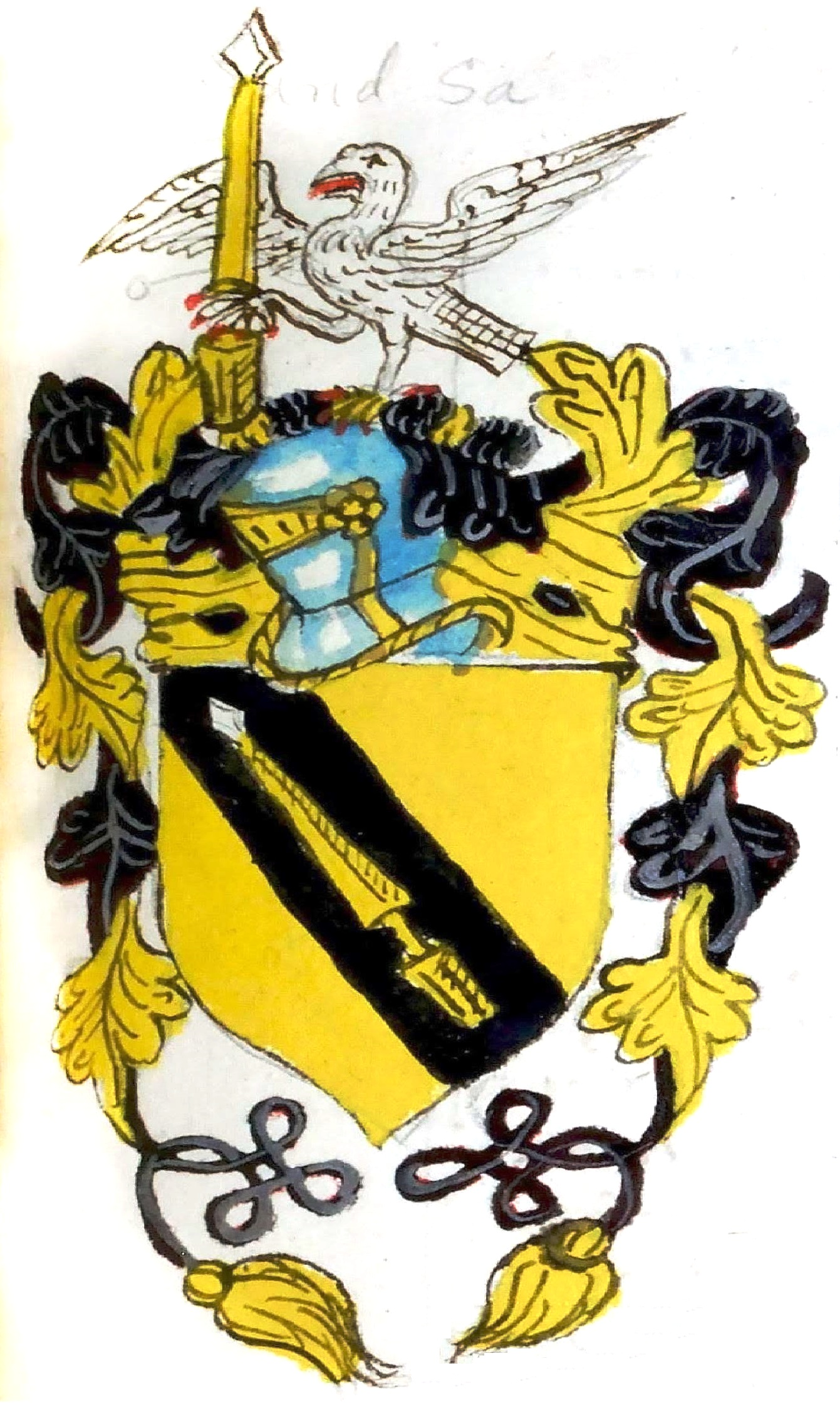
Arms granted to the Shakespeare family in 1596

On 20 October 1596, John Shakespeare and his children (including Gilbert) were granted permission to display a coat of arms. It was gold-colored, with a black banner bearing a silver spear, and a motto saying "Non sans droit".

Gilbert Shakespeare seems to have moved back to Stratford by 1602. On 1 May of that year he acted as his brother William's agent in taking delivery of the deed to 107 acres (43 ha) of farm land in Old Stratford, which William Shakespeare had bought from John and William Combe for £320. Along with several unsavoury Warwickshire characters, Gilbert was named in a bill of complaint on 21 November 1609 instigated by Joan Bromley, a Stratford widow, but the details of the suit are unknown. He signed his name in a neat Italian hand, "Gilbert Shakesper", as witness on 5 March 1610 to a lease of property in Bridge Street in Stratford.

== Death ==
The register of the Holy Trinity church records the burial of "Gilbert Shakspeare, adolescens" on 3 February 1611–12, which today is generally taken to be the Gilbert Shakespeare baptised in 1566. Charlotte Stopes tracked every usage of the terms adolescens, adolocentulus and adolocentula and their variants in the Stratford parish register and came to the conclusion that adolescens (Latin: "growing, adolescent") meant only that Gilbert Shakespeare died unmarried, especially in the absence of any records of his marriage, the baptism of a child, any other record of his death, and the fact that he is not mentioned in his brother's will. Mark Eccles and Schoenbaum have followed her judgement.

Earlier biographers, however, speculated that this might be his son instead. Of the burial entry, Sidney Lee wrote: "'Gilbert Shakespeare adolescens,' who was buried at Stratford on 3 February 1611–12, was doubtless son of the poet's next brother, Gilbert; the latter, having nearly completed his forty-sixth year, could scarcely be described as adolescens; his death is not recorded, but according to William Oldys he survived to a patriarchal age."

Oldys wrote in the mid-18th century, without certainty as to identity: "One of Shakespeare's younger brothers, who lived to a good old age, even some years, as I compute, after the restoration of King Charles the Second [1660]... The curiosity at this time of the most noted actors to learn something from him of his brother, etc., they justly held him in the highest veneration..."

== Notes and references ==
=== Sources ===
- Schoenbaum, S. (1977). William Shakespeare: A Compact Documentary Life. Oxford: Oxford University Press. ISBN 0195024338.
- Honan, Park (1998). Shakespeare: A Life. Oxford: Oxford University Press. ISBN 978-0192825278.
- Stopes, Charlotte Carmichael (1914). Shakespeare's Environment. London: G. Bell and sons. OCLC 2687346.
- Eccles, Mark (1961). Shakespeare in Warwickshire. Madison: University of Wisconsin Press. ISBN 978-0299023300. OCLC 313136.
- Skottowe, Augustine (1824). The Life of Shakespeare: Enquiries Into the Originality of His Dramatic Plots and Characters; and Essays on the Ancient Theatres and Theatrical Usages. Vol. 1. London: Longman, Hurst, Rees, Orme, Brown, and Green. OCLC 220543534.
- Lee, Sir Sidney (1900). Shakespeare's life and work: being an abridgement, chiefly for the use of students, of A life of William Shakespeare (4th ed.). London: Smith, Elder, & Co. OCLC 471754327.
- Lee, Sidney (1897). "William Shakespeare". Dictionary of National Biography: Scoffin—Sheares. Vol. 51. London: Smith, Elder, & Co.
- Yeowell, James, ed. (1862). A Literary Antiquary: Memoir of William Oldys. Together with His Diary, Choice Notes From His Adversaria, and an Account of the London Libraries. London: Spottiswoode & Co.
