= Yeowell =

Yeowell is a surname. Notable people with this surname include:

- James Yeowell (1802–1875), English antiquary
- Steve Yeowell, British comics artist
