= Mary Shakespeare =

Mother of William Shakespeare (1536-1608)

Mary Arden
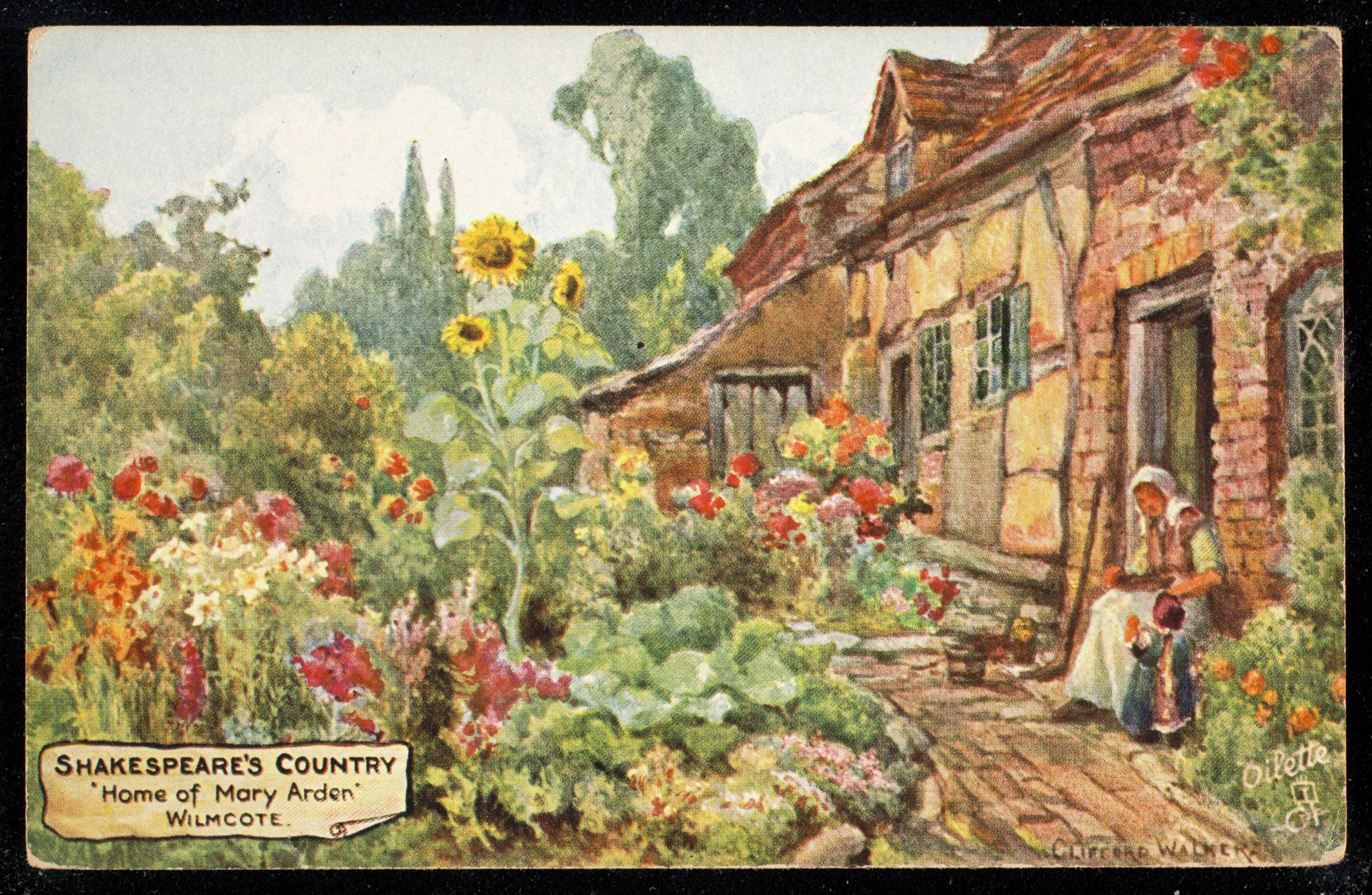
- A 1900s postcard depicting Mary Shakespeare
- Born: Mary Arden c. 1536–1538; Wilmcote, England
- Died: September 1608 (aged c. 70); Stratford-upon-Avon, England
- Burial place: Church of the Holy Trinity, Stratford-upon-Avon
- Spouse: John Shakespeare (m. 1557–1601; his death)
- Children: 8, including William, Gilbert, Joan and Edmund
- Father: Robert Arden

Mary Shakespeare (née Arden; c. 1537 – September 1608) (Note: English personal names were not spelled consistently in the Tudor period; Mary's name is recorded variously as Marye Shackspere, Mayry Shaxspere.) was the mother of William Shakespeare.

== Biography ==
Mary was born about 1536 in Wilmcote, the daughter of Robert Arden, a gentleman farmer and junior descendant of the Arden family, who were prominent in Warwickshire. She was the youngest of eight daughters, and when her father died in 1556 she inherited land at Snitterfield and Wilmcote from him as a dowry. The house was left to her stepmother Agnes Hill.

The Arden family was one of status and Mary's ancestors were well connected in society, including Thomas Arden, who fought in the Second Barons' War (1264–67) on the side of Simon de Montfort; Robert Arden who fought in the Wars of the Roses, and John Arden who served at the court of Henry VII. The wider Arden family was known to be of the Catholic faith and was influential in the Recusant community.

== Personal life ==
Mary married John Shakespeare in 1557, when she was 20 years old and he was approximately 26 years old. His father, Richard Shakespeare, was a tenant farmer on land owned by her father in Snitterfield. As the daughter of Richard's landlord, she may have known John since childhood.

Mary bore eight children: Joan (1558), Margaret (1562–1563), William (1564–1616), Gilbert (1566–1612), Joan (1569–1646), Anne (1571–1579), Richard (1574–1613), and Edmund (1580–1607). Several of them died young. Their first daughter, Joan, died; the name was used again for their third daughter. Their second daughter, Margaret, also died in infancy.

== Death and legacy ==
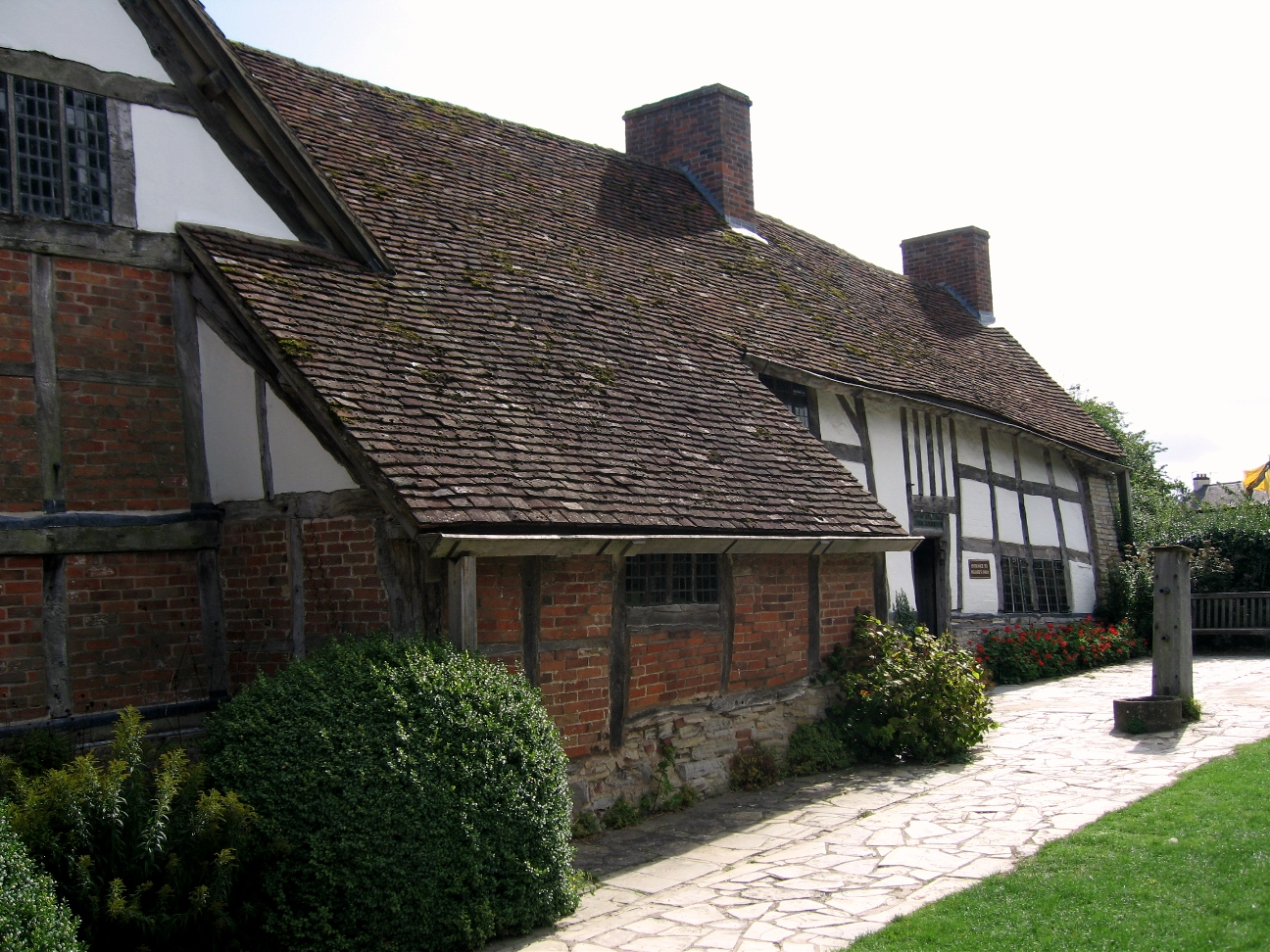
Palmer's Farm (rear)

Mary died in September 1608. The Mary Arden's Farm in Wilmcote was maintained in good condition as a working farmhouse, until it was bought by the Shakespeare Birthplace Trust in 1930 and refurnished in the Tudor period style. In 2000 it was discovered that the building preserved as Mary Arden's house had belonged to a friend and neighbour, Adam Palmer, and the house was accordingly renamed Palmer's Farm. The house that had belonged to the Arden family – which was near to Palmer's Farm – had been acquired by the Shakespeare Birthplace Trust in 1968 for preservation as part of a farmyard, without knowing its true provenance. The house and farm are open as a historic museum displaying 16th-century life.
