= John Shakespeare =

Father of playwright William Shakespeare (1520–1601)

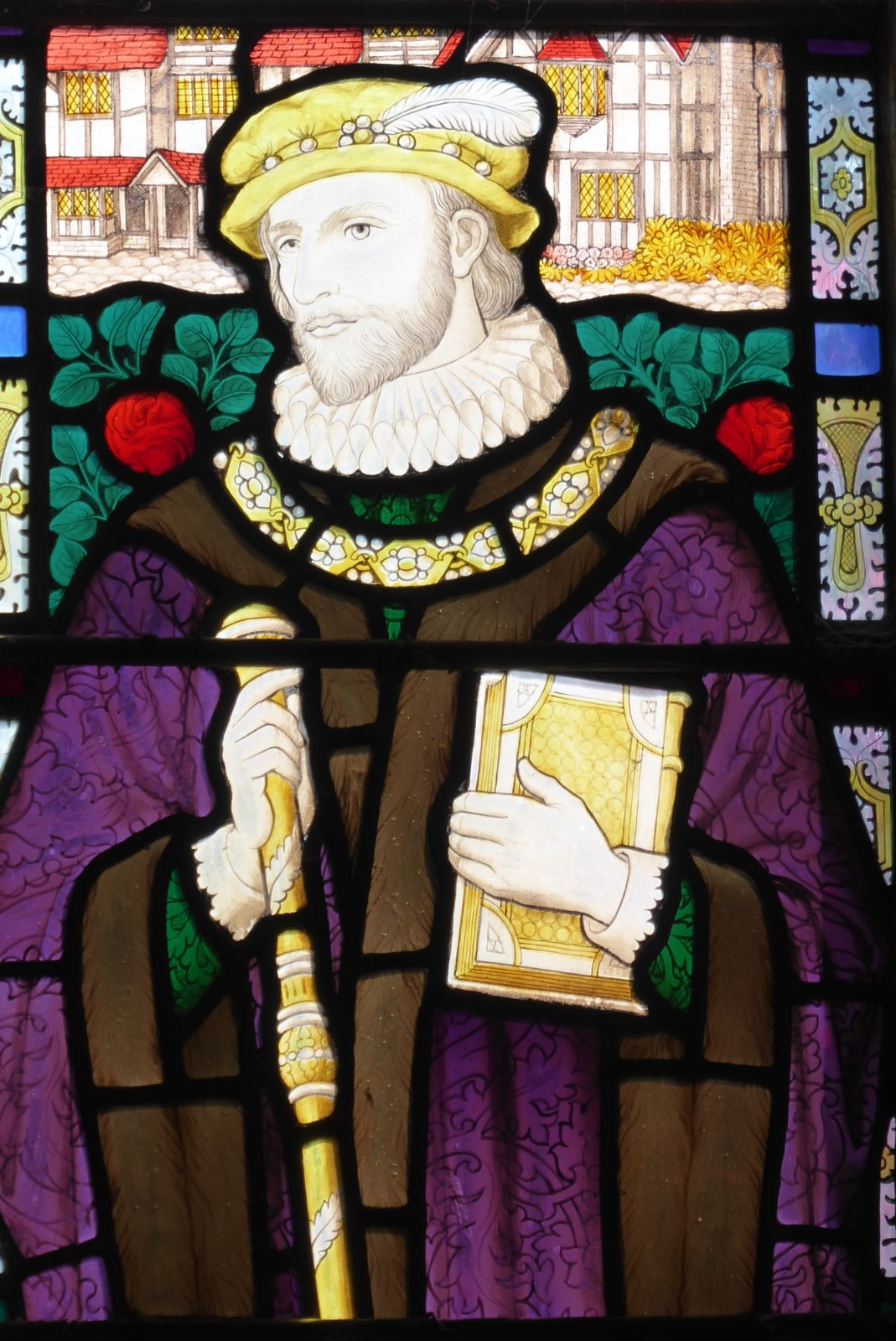
- 20th-century depiction of John Shakespeare in stained glass at the Guild Chapel, Stratford. He wears a chain and holds a rod to indicate his position of mayor.
- Born: Late 1520s Snitterfield, Warwickshire, England
- Died: 7 September 1601; Stratford-upon-Avon, Warwickshire, England
- Burial place: Church of the Holy Trinity, Stratford-upon-Avon
- Occupations: Glover and leatherworker; local politician
- Known for: Father of William Shakespeare
- Spouse: Mary Arden
- Children: 8, including William, Gilbert, Joan and Edmund
- Father: Richard Shakespeare
- Family: Shakespeare family

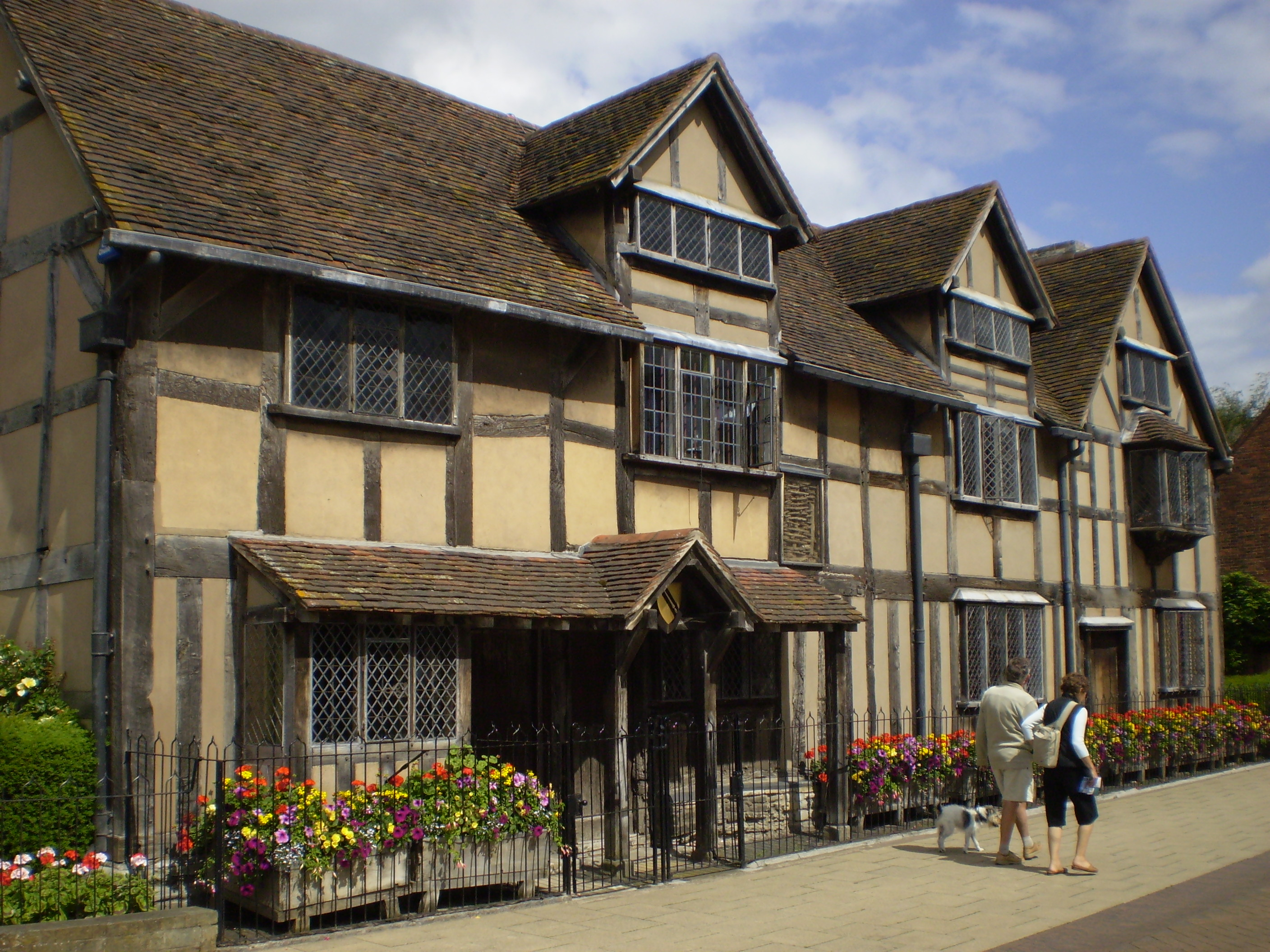
Shakespeare's restored house on Henley Street in Stratford-upon-Avon, now open to the public as Shakespeare's Birthplace

John Shakespeare (late 1520s – 7 September 1601) was an English businessman who was the father of William Shakespeare. Active in Stratford-upon-Avon, he was a glover and whittawer (leather worker) by trade. Shakespeare was elected to several municipal offices, serving as an alderman and culminating in a term as bailiff, the chief magistrate of the town council, and mayor of Stratford in 1568, before he fell on hard times for reasons unknown. His fortunes later revived and he was granted a coat of arms five years before his death, probably at the instigation and expense of his son, the actor and playwright.

He married Mary Arden, with whom he had eight children, five of whom survived into adulthood.

== Life ==
=== Early career ===
John was the son of Richard Shakespeare, a wealthy husbandman of the Warwickshire village of Snitterfield. By April 1552 he was living (or at least owned property) in Stratford-upon-Avon, where in October 1556 he bought two more properties, one on Greenhill Street and one on Henley Street. The latter became the eastern wing of Shakespeare's Birthplace when, in 1576, he bought two houses to the west and joined the three together. Ownership of freehold property gave him burgess status, which paved the way for future municipal appointments.

==== Trade ====
From 1556 to 1592, several official records identify him as a glovemaker, which was probably his primary trade, as tradition remembers him as following that trade even into his old age, but the records of his real estate purchases and legal expenses indicate an income much higher than that of a small-town tradesman. The administration of his father's estate in 1561 names him as a farmer. He inherited and leased agricultural lands and is on record as selling timber and barley. Court records also document him as a "brogger", an unlicensed—and therefore illegal—wool dealer. In addition, he bought and leased out houses. He was twice taken to court for violating the usury laws that prohibited charging interest higher than the legal limit of 10 per cent.

==== Municipal roles ====
In 1556, Shakespeare was elected borough ale taster, the first of several key municipal positions he was to hold in Stratford. In that position he was responsible for ensuring that weights and measures and prices were observed by innkeepers and publicans within the borough, and also by butchers, bakers and town traders. In 1558 he was appointed borough constable, and in 1559 he became an affeeror. He became chamberlain in 1561 and alderman in 1565.

In 1568, Shakespeare was appointed high bailiff, the equivalent of mayor today, elected by the common council of burgesses and aldermen. In that capacity he presided at the sessions of the court of record and at council meetings. For his borough the bailiff was almoner, coroner, escheator, and clerk of the market, and served as justice of the peace issuing warrants and negotiating with the lord of the manor on behalf of the corporation.

=== Marriage and children ===
Arden Coat of Arms

He married Mary Arden, one of the Ardens of Warwickshire, a local gentry family and reportedly a niece of John Shakespeare's father Richard Shakespeare. It is not known when they married, but a date around 1557 is assumed as there is a baptismal record for a "Joan Shakespeare, daughter to John Shakespeare" dated 15 September 1558.

The Shakespeares had eight children:

- Joan (baptised 15 September 1558, died in infancy),
- Margaret (bap. 2 December 1562 – buried 30 April 1563),
- William (bap. 26 April 1564 – 23 April 1616),
- Gilbert (bap. 13 October 1566 – bur. 2 February 1612),
- Joan (bap. 15 April 1569 – bur. 4 November 1646),
- Anne (bap. 28 September 1571 – bur. 4 April 1579),
- Richard (bap. 11 March 1574 – bur. 4 February 1613) and
- Edmund (bap. 3 May 1580 – bur. London, 31 December 1607).

=== Financial problems ===
Shakespeare fell on hard times in the late 1570s that would last until the early 1590s. From January 1577 to his discharge in September 1586, Shakespeare only attended one council meeting. His absence has been taken as evidence of his being in debt, as he could not be arrested in his home. Though absenteeism was punishable by fine, Shakespeare was never fined, perhaps out of sympathy for his financial situation. Further evidence of financial difficulty is found in the years 1578–9, when Shakespeare mortgaged, sold, and rented out various of his properties, including those acquired through his marriage to Mary.

Multiple cases were brought against Shakespeare in local court, such as in October 1585, when he was taken to court over a debt owed. As he did not appear, two writs of distraint were issued against him, and in January 1586 the sergeants-at-mace reported that they had been unable to execute the writ because Shakespeare "had nothing of which he could be distrained". Two successive writs of capias was therefore issued for his arrest, but the case, which was costing the plaintiff money, was ultimately dropped. Another case involved a debt of £22 owed by John's brother, Henry, for whom John had acted as surety. John was arrested over this in January 1587 but released on bail. The case was presented in court and John denied any guilt, producing a writ of habeas corpus. What became of the case after this is unknown.

John Shakespeare was buried on 8 September 1601 at Holy Trinity Church, Stratford.

== Personality and religious beliefs ==
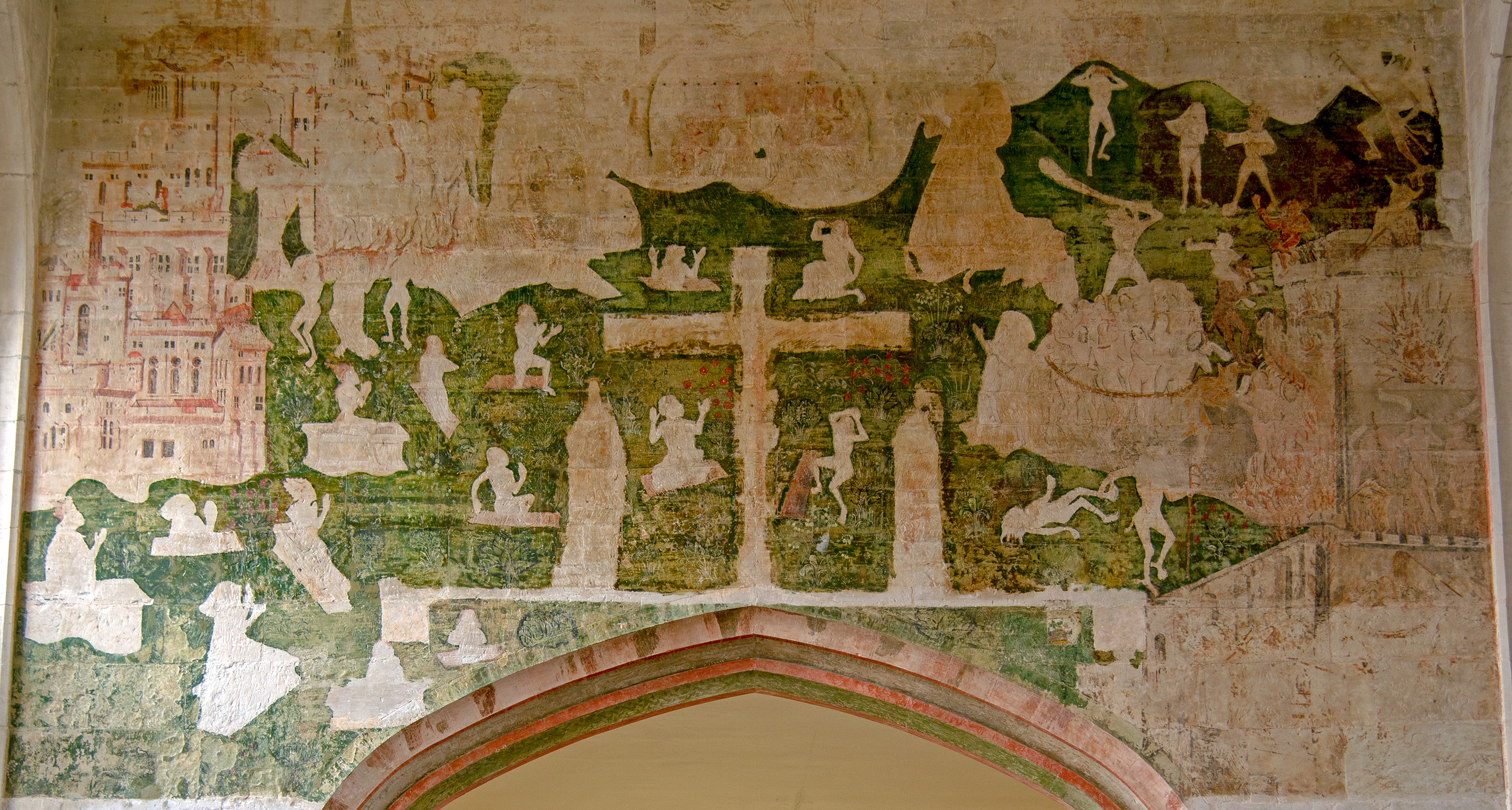
The restored wall paintings of the Guild Chapel in Stratford-upon-Avon that were defaced by Shakespeare

The only record that survives of Shakespeare's personality is a note written by Thomas Plume fifty years after his death. Plume records a conversation with Sir John Mennes (1599–1671), who stated that he had once met him in his shop and described him as a "merry cheeked old man" who said of his son that "Will was a good honest fellow, but he durst have cracked a jest with him at any time." As Katherine Duncan-Jones points out, this is impossible, since Mennes was two years old when John Shakespeare died. She thinks Plume may have been recording an anecdote related by Mennes taken from his father.

Shakespeare and his immediate family were conforming members of the established Church of England. John Shakespeare was elected to several municipal offices, which required being a church member in good standing. William Shakespeare's baptism and that of his siblings were entered into the parish church register, as were the burials of family members. Shakespeare, acting as town chamberlain and in accordance with Elizabeth I's injunction of 1559 to remove "all signs of superstition and idolatry from places of worship", covered over the wall-paintings of the Chapel of the Guild of the Holy Cross some time in the 1560s or 1570s; his contemporary record detailed paying two shillings for "defasyng ymages in þe chapel" ("defacing images in the chapel").

However, some scholars believe there is evidence that several members of Shakespeare's family were secretly recusant Roman Catholics. Mary Arden was from a Catholic family. A tract, apparently signed by a "J. Shakespeare", in which the author pledged to remain a Catholic in their heart, was found in the 18th century in the rafters of a house on Henley Street. It was seen and described by scholar Edmond Malone but apparently was subsequently lost. Anthony Holden writes that Malone's reported wording of the tract is linked to a testament written by Charles Borromeo and circulated in England by Edmund Campion, copies of which still exist in Italian and English. Other research suggests the Borromeo testament dated from 1638 at the earliest and could never have been in the possession of John Shakespeare, rather than his daughter, Joan Shakespeare. The first leaf of the document had been forged by John Jordan who acquired the manuscript and attempted to have it published. Scholar Matthew Steggle believes that the "Testament" cannot chronologically belong to John but instead may be by his daughter Joan (William's sister), and that its discoverer, John Jordan, forged the missing first page and misread the name "Joan" for "John".

== Coat of arms ==
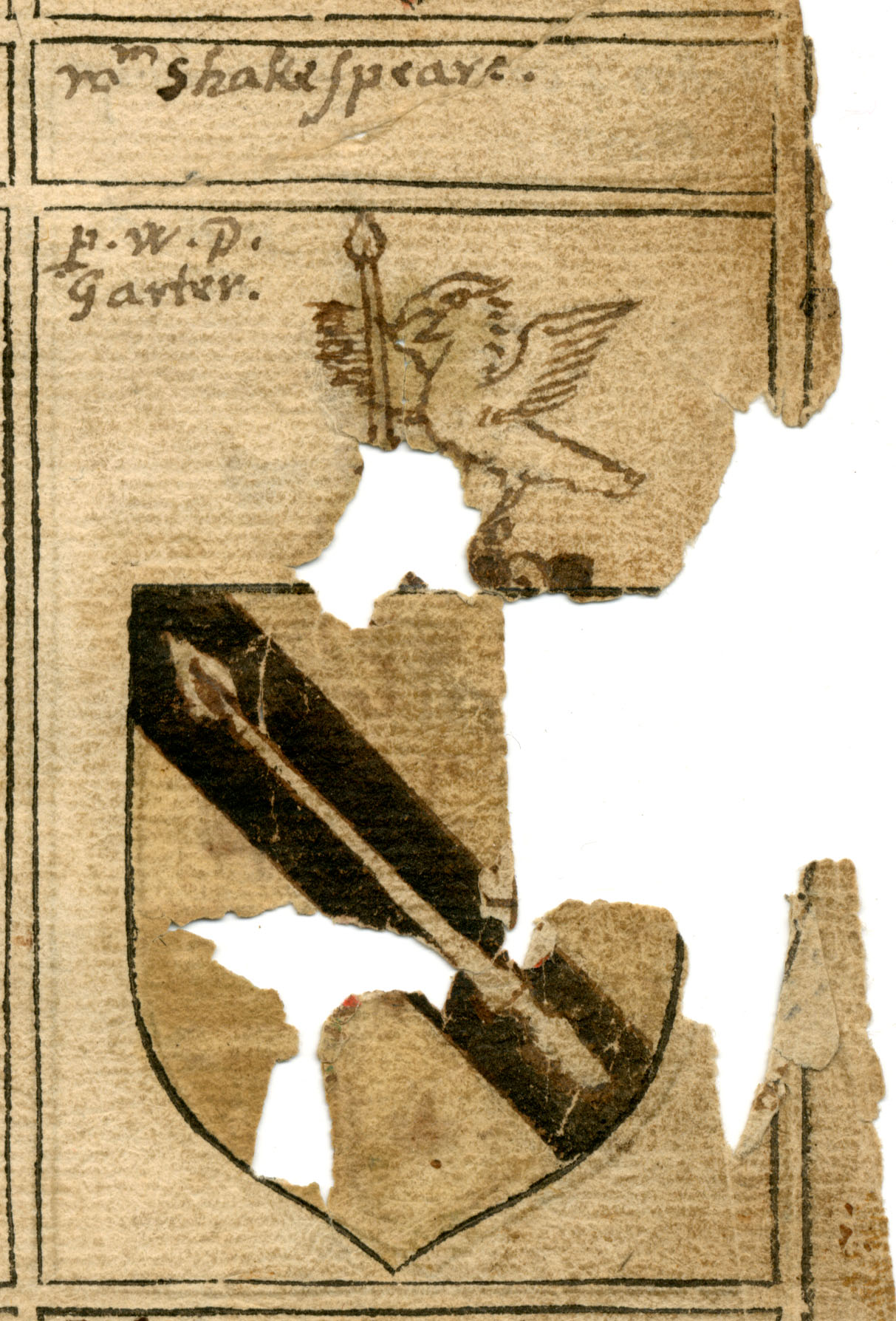
Shakespeare's coat of arms, granted in 1596, 1602 version

In 1569, Shakespeare had applied for a coat of arms; the application—subsequently withdrawn—included a vague claim of an ancestor having been honoured by King Henry VII, a draft of which application (with parenthetical additions representing amendments to be made in a successive draft) read: "John Shakespeare ... whose parentes and late antecessors [grandfather] were for there [his] valeant and faithefull service advaunced and rewarded by the most prudent prince king Henry the Seventh of famous memorie, sythence whiche tyme they have continewed ... in good reputation and credit ...". After a long period of dormancy, arms were granted by William Dethick of the College of Arms on 20 October 1596. Most historians believe that his son, William, re-opened the application following his literary and financial success in London. This application additionally made reference to John Shakespeare having married "the daughter and heir of Arden, a gentleman of worship".
