= Richard Shakespeare =

Grandfather of William Shakespeare (1490–before 1561)

- Born: 1490; Wroxall, England
- Died: before 10 February 1561
- Occupation: Farmer
- Known for: Grandfather of William Shakespeare
- Children: John; Henry

Richard Shakespeare (1490 – before 10 February 1561) was a husbandman of Snitterfield, Warwickshire, four miles (6.5 km) north-northeast of Stratford-upon-Avon, the father of John Shakespeare and the grandfather of William Shakespeare.

== Life ==
Shakespeare was born in the Wroxall area in Warwickshire, about 7 miles (11 km) to the north of Snitterfield. At some time before 1529, he removed to Snitterfield, where he was a tenant farmer until his death on land owned by Robert Arden, the father of Mary Arden, who married his son John, the poet's father.

Richard Shakespeare is mentioned in the court and manorial records as a prosperous farmer with livestock. Thomas Atwood alias Taylor, a prosperous vintner and clothier who was a member of the Stratford Guild, bequeathed him a team of four oxen he was keeping. He was fined two pence for not attending the manor court in 1529, and he was charged with overburdening the commons with his cattle and fined for letting them run loose in the meadows and neglecting to ring or yoke his swine.

At the time of his death, Richard leased 80 acres of land on which his house stood, situated from the corner of High Street (now Bell Lane) down to the ford over the stream that flowed through the village into the Avon. His estate was valued at £38 17s (equivalent to £15,528 in 2025).

== See also ==
- Shakespeare baronets, said to be descendants of Richard Shakespeare.
