= Shakespeare's will =

1616 last will and testament of William Shakespeare

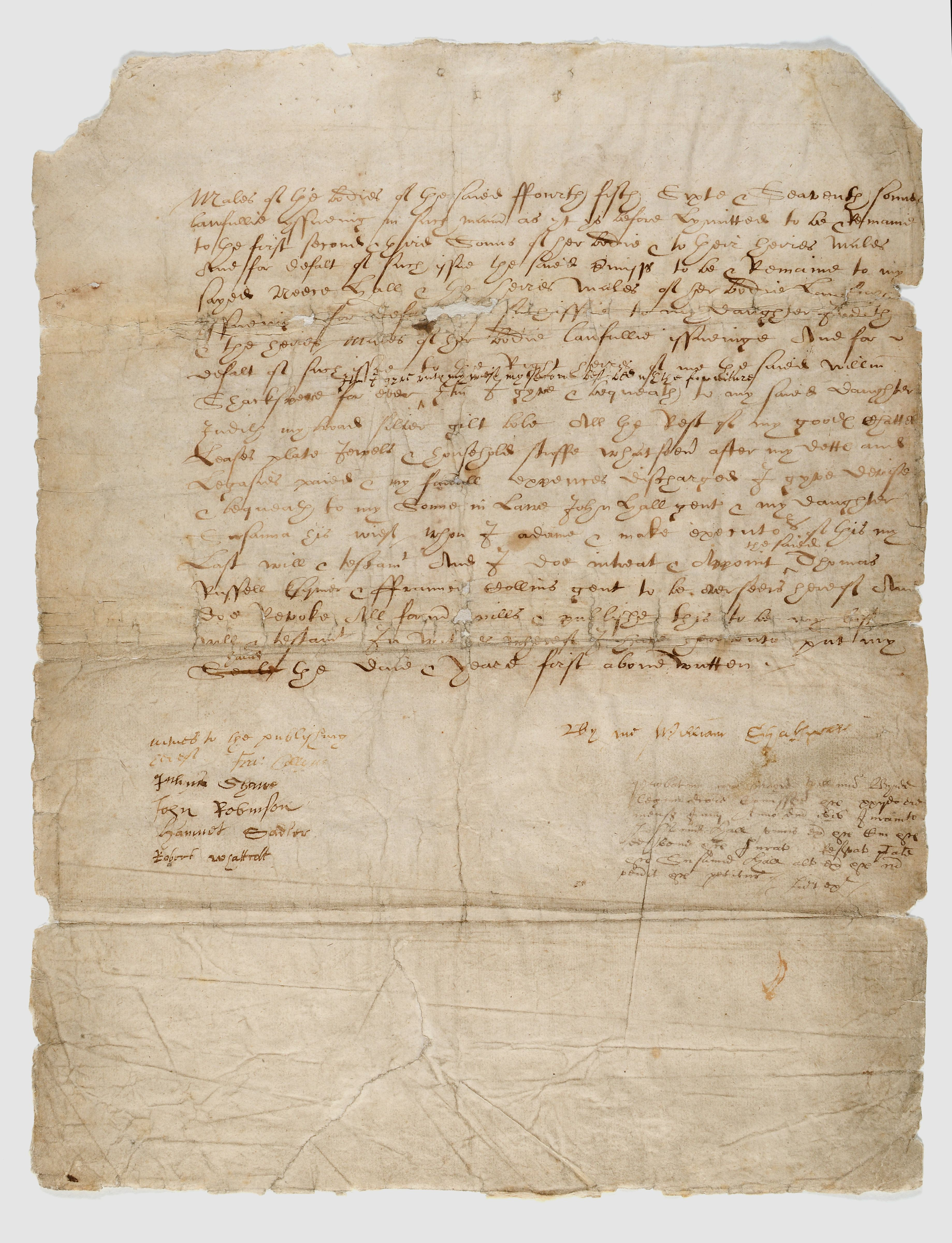
The third and last page of William Shakespeare's will, written in secretary hand; signed below right

William Shakespeare's last will and testament was signed on 25 March 1616, just under a month before his death. (Note: Images of the original document complete may be freely viewed at The National Archives (United Kingdom) Discovery Catalogue online, ref PROB 1/4.) The document has been studied for details of his personal life, for his opinions, and for his attitudes towards his two daughters, Susanna and Judith, and their respective husbands, John Hall and Thomas Quiney. The best-known passage of the will is the bequest to the wife of his "second best bed"; though the meaning and significance of this phrase is not certain.

The content of the will has also been studied for clues about Shakespeare's religious beliefs, his health, and his relationship to his colleagues in the London theatre-world. (Note: A careful transcript and list of references are found in Honigmann & Brock 1993.)

== Context ==
Shakespeare's will was made shortly after his daughter Judith was married to Thomas Quiney. He first summoned his lawyer, Francis Collins, in January 1616, shortly before the couple's wedding on 10 February. A draft of the will was made, but not signed. It was soon revealed that Quiney had made another woman, named Margaret Wheeler, pregnant. In mid-March 1616, Margaret Wheeler died in childbirth; her baby died with her, and they were both buried on 15 March. On 25 March, Shakespeare made a number of alterations to his will, probably because he was dying and because of particular concerns regarding Thomas Quiney. In the first draft of the will there had been an apparent provision "vnto my sonne in L[aw]"; but "sonne in L[aw]" was then struck out, with Judith's name inserted in its stead.

There is evidence that Shakespeare had a close relationship with his other son-in-law, John Hall, who was married to his first daughter Susanna.

Other persons mentioned in the will are friends and business associates in Stratford and in London, including several of his colleagues from the theatre.

== Preamble ==
The preamble is conventional and typical of other wills of the period:

In the name of God Amen. I William Shakespeare of Stratford upon Avon in the county of Warwickshire gent., in perfect health & memory God be praised, do make & ordain this my last will & testament in manner & form following. That is to say first, I commend my Soul into the hands of God my Creator, hoping & assuredly believing through the only merits of Jesus Christ my Saviour to be made partaker of life everlasting. And my body to the earth whereof it is made.

The phrase beginning with "the only merits of Jesus Christ..." (making Christ the unique agent of salvation) is an explicitly Anglican or Protestant formula, as differentiated from pre-Reformation and later Roman Catholic formulae in which the intercession of saints and others of the celestial company is often invoked for the salvation of the soul.

== Bequests ==
To his daughter Judith he bequeathed £100 (equivalent to £20,000 in 2025) "in discharge of her marriage porcion"; another £50 if she was to relinquish the Chapel Lane cottage; and, if she or any of her children were still alive at the end of three years following the date of the will, a further £150, of which she was to receive the interest but not the principal. This money was explicitly denied to Thomas Quiney unless he were to bestow on Judith lands of equal value. In a separate bequest, Judith was given "my broad silver gilt bole."

The interlinear bequest that is best known is the one that reads: "It[e]m I gyve unto my wief my second best bed w[i]th the furniture". It is an interlinear addition that was written with such a shaky hand, on a line that weaves up and down, and so scribbled that it took a century for scholars to finally decipher the words. It may be the last thing written into the document before the signatures. The fact that he leaves his wife, Anne, "my second-best bed, with the furniture", while his son-in-law John Hall and the latter's wife, his other daughter Susanna, was left with the rest of his "goods, chattels, leases, plate, jewels, and household stuff whatsoever" has been the source of various speculations. It has been suggested that it indicates an unkindness towards his wife, or instead that Anne may have become an invalid and incapable of administering the estate (about which there is no evidence), or perhaps that the unmentioned 'best bed' was kept for guests or it may have been Shakespeare's death bed. Perhaps the 'second-best' was the matrimonial bed which had special significance. It has also been speculated that Anne was to be supported by her children. Germaine Greer suggests that the bequests were the result of agreements made at the time of Susanna's marriage to Dr Hall: that she (and thus her husband) inherited the bulk of Shakespeare's estate. Shakespeare had business ventures with Dr Hall and consequently appointed John and Susanna as executors of his will. Dr Hall and Susanna inherited and moved into New Place after Shakespeare's death.

John Heminges, Henry Condell and Richard Burbage were Shakespeare's colleagues, fellow actors, and founding shareholders of the Globe Theatre. Each of them had a son named William. In the will, they each were bequeathed 26 shillings and eightpence (equivalent to £290 in 2025) to buy mourning rings. Stanley Wells and others have wondered if that bequest represented a kind of pact for the three men to create and publish an edition of Shakespeare's collected plays. Shakespeare would certainly have known that Ben Jonson was four years into a project that would result in a collected edition of Jonson's own works. Burbage died in 1619 but, within six years of the bequest, printing nevertheless began on the First Folio, with Heminges and Condell as the editors.

For the bulk of his estate, which included his main house, New Place, his two houses on Henley Street and various lands in and around Stratford, Shakespeare had set up an entail. His estate was bequeathed, in descending order of choice, to the following: 1) his daughter, Susanna Hall; 2) upon Susanna's death, "to the first Sonne of her body lawfully issuing & to the Heires Males of the body of the said first Sonne lawfully issuing"; 3) to Susanna's second son and his male heirs; 4) to Susanna's third son and his male heirs; 5) to Susanna's "fourth... fifth sixth & Seventh sons" and their male heirs; 6) to Elizabeth Hall, Susanna and John Hall's firstborn, and her male heirs; 7) to Judith and her male heirs; or 8) to whatever heirs the law would normally recognise. This elaborate entail is usually taken to indicate that Thomas Quiney was not to be entrusted with Shakespeare's inheritance, although some have speculated that it might simply indicate that Susanna was the favoured child.

== Sources ==
- Bate, Jonathan (2009). Soul of the Age: A Biography of the Mind of William Shakespeare. Random House Publishing Group. ISBN 9781588367815.
- Brown, Ivor (1951). Shakespeare. Reprint Society, William Collins Sons & Co.
- Chambers, E. K. (1930). William Shakespeare: A Study of Facts and Problems. Vol. 2. Oxford: Clarendon Press.
- Edmondson, Paul (2015). "His editors John Heminges and Henry Condell". In Edmondson, Paul; Wells, Stanley (eds.). The Shakespeare Circle: An Alternative Biography. Cambridge: Cambridge University Press. pp. 315–328. doi:10.1017/CBO9781107286580.030. ISBN 9781107286580.
- Hamilton, Charles (1985). In Search of Shakespeare. Harcourt Brace. ISBN 9780156445535.
- Honan, Park (1999). Shakespeare: A Life. Oxford: Oxford University Press. ISBN 0192825275.
- Honigmann, E. A. J.; Brock, Susan (1993). Playhouse Wills: 1558–1642. The Revels Plays Companion Library. Manchester and New York: Manchester University Press. ISBN 9780719030161.
- Pearson, Hesketh (1961). A Life of Shakespeare. New York: Walker & Company.
- Rowse, A. L. (1975). "Popular Misconceptions about William Shakespeare". Discoveries and Reviews: from Renaissance to Restoration. London and Basingstoke: The Macmillan Press. pp. 35–38. ISBN 0064960099.
- Schoenbaum, Samuel (1987). William Shakespeare: A Compact Documentary Life. Oxford University Press. ISBN 0-19-505161-0.
- Shaughnessy, Robert (2013). The Routledge Guide to William Shakespeare. Routledge. ISBN 9781136855047.
- Wells, Stanley (2003). Shakespeare for All Time. Oxford: Oxford University Press. ISBN 9780195160932.
