= Edmund Shakespeare =

Brother of William Shakespeare

- Born: 1580; Stratford-upon-Avon, Warwickshire, England
- Died: buried 31 December 1607
- Known for: Brother of William Shakespeare
- Parent(s): John Shakespeare; Mary Arden

Edmund Shakespeare (1580 – buried 31 December 1607) was an English actor, and the brother of William Shakespeare.

== Life ==
Shakespeare was born in 1580, in Stratford-upon-Avon. He was the youngest child of John Shakespeare and Mary Arden and the brother of William Shakespeare. He followed William to London to become an actor. While an actor, he had an affair with an unknown woman, probably around 1600 although there is no firm evidence. He fathered a son, Edward Shakespeare, in one record noted wrongly as Edmund Sharksbye. He died in 1607, at the age of 27, four months after the death of his son. Twenty shillings was paid for his burial (possibly by William) at St Saviour's in Southwark (known today as Southwark Cathedral) "with a forenoone knell of the great bell".

He was buried on 31 December 1607, in London.

== In popular culture ==
Edmund Shakespeare was the subject of a one-man show, written and performed by the British actor Ben Deery, in 2012, at The Last Refuge, Peckham, London. The play's title, Most Savage and Unnatural, alludes to a line spoken by the character of Edmund in the play King Lear by William Shakespeare. The performance included elements of audience participation and was warmly received.

He appears as Ned Shakespeare in Nicole Galland's science fiction/time travel novel Master of the Revels, published in 2021.
