= Snitterfield =

Village in Warwickshire, England

Coordinates: 52.236473°N 1.687002°W

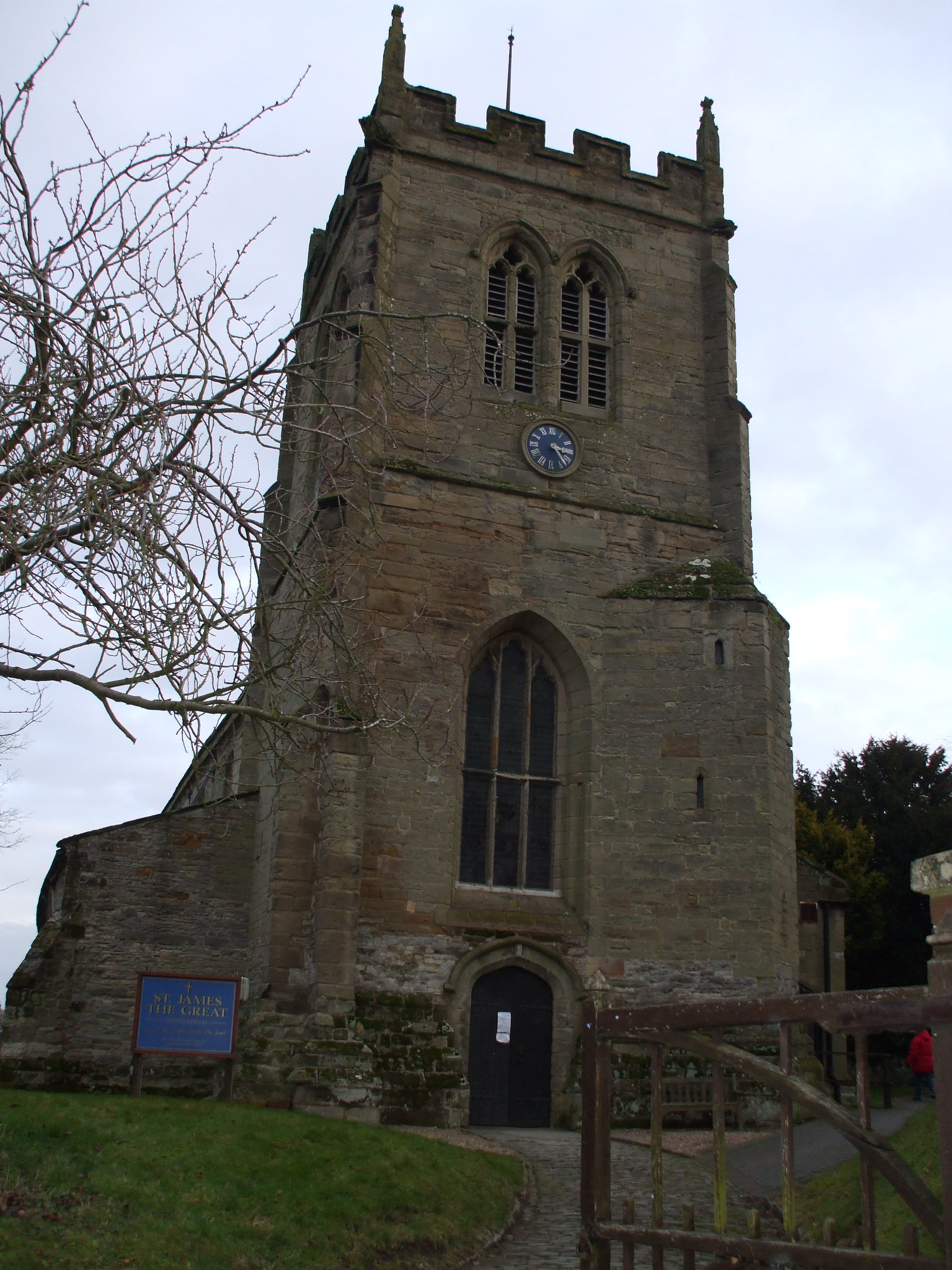
- St James the Great, Snitterfield

- Location within Warwickshire
- Population: 1,226 (2011)
- OS grid reference: SP2160
  - London: 101 miles (163 km) SE
- Civil parish: Snitterfield
- District: Stratford-on-Avon
- Shire county: Warwickshire
- Region: West Midlands
- Country: England
- Sovereign state: United Kingdom
- Post town: STRATFORD-UPON-AVON
- Postcode district: CV37
- Police: Warwickshire
- Fire: Warwickshire
- Ambulance: West Midlands
- UK Parliament: Stratford-on-Avon

Snitterfield is a village and civil parish in the Stratford on Avon district of Warwickshire, England, less than 1 mile (1.6 km) to the north of the A46 road, 4.5 miles (7.2 km) from Stratford upon Avon, 6.5 miles (10.5 km) from Warwick and 17 miles (27 km) from Coventry. The population of the civil parish at the 2011 census was 1,226.

== History ==
The early name of Snitterfield was "Snytenfeld", open field of snipe, "Feld", signifying a cleared stretch of land amid the Forest of Arden and "Snyten" referring to the snipe frequenting the meadows near the Sherbourne Brook which runs through the village. The earliest record of Snitterfield is on a map dated 1630 by John Speed and as late as 1814, Snitterfield was spelt as Snitfield. At the time of the Norman Conquest Snitefeld was held by Saxi who also possessed land at Walton, Charlecote, Bramcote, Dorsington and Werlavescote but by 1086 it was held by the Count of Meulan; "in Ferncombe hundred, Snitefeld. Saxi held it he was a free man. 4 hides. Land for 14 ploughs. In lordship 2; 10 slaves.11 villagers with a priest and 4 smallholders have 6 ploughs. Meadow 12 acres. Value before 1066 and later £4; now 100s."

== Economy ==
Welcombe Hills vineyard was established in 2001 situated at Vine Cottage, Kings Lane, Snitterfield, producing English wines from Pinot Noir, Dornfelder and Bacchus grape varieties. In August 2009, all five Welcombe Hills wines entered in the Mercian Vineyards Association regional competition won medals. Shakespearean connections are reflected in the home of some of Snitterfield's major employers, at Prospero Barn, The Green Snitterfield; Prospero is a character in The Tempest. Prospero Barn houses Structured Training Ltd, SalesPathways Ltd and Predaptive OD Ltd. Other employers include the Stratford Manor Hotel, a Mercedes-Benz dealership, and the local Wyevale Garden Centre. Snitterfield is also home to one of the United Kingdom's oldest-established independent factoring brokerages, Factoring Partners.

== Governance ==
Snitterfield is a ward of Stratford-on-Avon District Council and represented by Councillor Peter Richards, Conservative. Nationally it is part of Stratford-on-Avon parliamentary constituency, whose current MP following the 2024 election is Manuela Perteghella of the Liberal Democrats. Prior to Brexit in 2020 it was part of the West Midlands electoral region of the European Parliament.

== Notable buildings ==
The parish church of St. James the Great consists of a chancel, nave, north and south aisles, and a west tower. There are also modern vestries north of the chancel and south of the tower. The sequence of the earlier development of the building is a little uncertain owing to the proximity of the various periods, added to the marked differences in detail, and some confusion is caused by later alterations. The south arcade probably dates from the latter half of the 13th century and the north from the early 14th century, but the similarity of the windows in both aisles suggests that after the north aisle was built the south aisle was widened to 9 ft (2.7 m). to match the other.

The chancel, built of rubble, is of severer detail and may have followed soon after the 14th-century north aisle; it is of great length compared with the nave and has large windows. The west tower was evidently erected in several successive stages: the lowest 10 ft (3.0 m). in the early 14th century, continued up another 8 or 9 ft (2.7 m). about 1340 with ashlar walling, the west window having moulded jambs rather like those of the south doorway, and completed c. 1400 in ashlar of larger stones. The clerestory was added early in the 16th century: there seems to have been some trouble from weaknesses in the arcades, especially the northern, which shows inequalities in the arches resulting probably from partial reconstructions, and most of its capitals have been rather crudely remoulded.

No important changes occurred before the 19th century, but there was some deterioration, as a description of 1858 mentions that the chancel was heavily buttressed on the north side and its windows had lost their tracery. The closing of the side doorways and insertion of the west doorway were done before that time. Scars and repairs in the arcades are evidence of the damage caused to the masonry by the erection of galleries in 1841. Probably the vestry south of the tower was then added. Since then the church has been well restored, the chancel windows provided with tracery, and the north vestry and organ chamber added.

== Transport links ==
The Monarch's Way, a long-distance footpath which approximates the escape route taken by King Charles II after being defeated in the Battle of Worcester, passes through Snitterfield. King's Lane owes its name to the tradition which says that Charles II rode through here with Jane Lane during his escape in September 1651.

== Sports and leisure ==
Snitterfield has a sport horse training centre, a riding school, and a sports club, incorporating tennis, bowls, cricket, and football. RAF Snitterfield a former Royal Air Force station is situated to the west of the village. The northern section is now the Stratford Oaks Golf Course and Driving Range. This was completed in 1992 while the south-east side is home to a glider club. The local Scouts Group is 'Bearley & Snitterfield' which includes Beaver, Cub and Scout sections. The village has grown with a 10 per cent increase in the amount of housing between 2002 and 2003. Further development is limited to barn conversions and plots for no more than five properties. The village has one pub, The Snitterfield Arms and a village shop, (voted England's best in 2002). The other village pub, The Foxhunter, was badly damaged by fire in June 2007 and after lying in a dilapidated condition for five years was demolished following an application by the local council. It has since been replaced by residential properties.

== Education ==
Snitterfield has Snitterfield Primary School.

School	Compulsory education stage	School website	Ofsted details
Snitterfield Primary School	Primary	Primary School	Ofsted details for unique reference number 125521

== Notable residents ==
- John Grant was born in Snitterfield of an old and respected family and lived at the now demolished moated house of Norbrook. He was brother-in-law to Thomas Wintour whose sister, Dorothy, he had married and was recruited into the Gunpowder Plot along with Robert Wintour and Catesby's servant Thomas Bates in March 1605. Norbrook became the plotters' Warwickshire headquarters and magazine where Grant stored gunpowder and weapons during the summer of 1605 and rode from here to the Red Lion Inn, Dunchurch to await news of Guy Fawkes' attempt. When the failure became known the conspirators dispersed, some to Norbrook where they rested the night of 6 November 1605 before making their way to Holbeche House, Staffordshire where they made their final stand. Here, Grant was blinded, his eyes being burnt out when a spark from the fire ignited the gunpowder they were trying to dry, which had become wet on the journey. He was captured and imprisoned in the Tower of London. After being found guilty along with the other conspirators, on Thursday 30 January he was executed outside St Paul's Cathedral, London along with Digby, Thomas Wintour and Thomas Bates. He refused to confess his treason saying it was "no sin against God". Still blinded, he allowed himself to be led quietly up the ladder to the halter and after crossing himself, went to his death. His estate was confiscated and granted to Bartholomew Hales, then Lord of Snitterfield.
- Richard Jago, the poet, was rector here from 1754 to 1781. He was born in 1715 at Beaudesert Rectory, Henley in Arden where his father Richard was rector. Educated at Solihull School, one of the houses is named after him, where he met another minor poet William Shenstone. From there he went to University College where he took his MA in 1738 having been made curate at Snitterfield the previous year. He became vicar of Harbury in 1746 and shortly after Chesterton both in Warwickshire followed by Snitterfield in 1754 where he took up residence until his death in 1781. Lord Willoughby de Broke presented him with the rectory at Kimcote in Leicestershire in 1771 and he resigned Harbury and Chesterton keeping Snitterfiled and Kimcote. His best known poem is the long topographical, Edge Hill (1767). Three silver birches were planted in the vicarage garden by his daughters.
- John Shakespeare, father of William Shakespeare, was born here but moved to Stratford having married Mary Arden and in 1579 surrendered his interests in the family property in Snitterfield to Robert Webbe.
- Richard Shakespeare, grandfather of the poet, is first mentioned in the manorial records of Snitterfield in 1535 and finally in 1560. He does not appear in the registers which begin in 1561 and is believed to have died in the intervening time. His wife, Abigail Webb, mother of John Shakespeare the poet's father, and a sister of Mary Webb (Mary Arden's mother) died in Snitterfield in 1595. Another of her sons, Henry, remained in the parish until his death in 1596.
- John Wootton, an English painter and illustrator of sporting subjects, battle scenes and landscapes, was born in Snitterfield around 1682. He probably received some instruction from Jan Wyck in the 1690s, and was possibly patronised from an early age by the aristocratic households of Beaufort and Coventry (as was Wyck), perhaps while working as a page to Lady Anne Somerset at Snitterfield House. Snitterfield House was situated south of the church, built in the late 17th century it was demolished in the early 19th century. However, there seems to be no real evidence for this save his early painted view of the house and the family's later acquisition of many of his works. Joseph Farington saw a painting of Diana and the Nymphs (1707; untraced) at Antony House, Cornwall, but Wootton's earliest extant dated work is the horse portrait Bonny Black (1711; Belvoir Castle, Leicestershire). By this time he had begun to establish himself in London, having moved there before his first marriage, to Elizabeth Walsh, in 1706. He was a subscriber to the first English Academy of Painting and Drawing in 1711 and by 1717 had been elected a steward of the Virtuosi Club of St Luke's. He died in London on 13 November 1764.
