= James Yeowell =

James Yeowell (1802–1875) was an English antiquary.

== Life ==
Yeowell was born about 1803 in London. He is said to have been employed in early life under the vestry of Shoreditch, and to have worked at indexing and related work for booksellers. Soon after the establishment by William John Thoms of Notes and Queries, Yeowell became sub-editor, and he filled the position for more than twenty years, retiring in September 1872. During this period Yeowell supplied by research at the British Museum the answers which appeared each week under the heading of 'Queries with Answers'. He lived at first in Pentonville, near the Sadler's Wells Theatre, and then at Barnsbury.

On his retirement from Notes and Queries he was nominated a poor brother at the London Charterhouse by the Duke of Buccleuch at the suggestion of Thoms. He died at the Charterhouse on 10 December 1875, and was buried on the western side of Highgate Cemetery two days later. His grave (no. 21049) no longer has a headstone. He was 'probably the last nonjuror, if not the last Jacobite, in England'.

== Works ==
Yeowell was the author of:

- ‘Chronicles of the Ancient British Church anterior to the Saxon Era,’ new ed. 1847; it originally appeared during 1839 in a monthly periodical.
- ‘A Literary Antiquary: Memoir of William Oldys, with his Diary, Notes from Adversaria, and an Account of the London Libraries,’ 1862; this came out in ‘Notes and Queries’ during 1861 and 1862.

He edited in 1853 the poetical works of Sir Thomas Wyatt and of Henry Howard, Earl of Surrey for the Aldine series; compiled, with other index work, the general indexes to the first three series of ‘Notes and Queries,’ and an index to Agnes Strickland's ‘Queens of England;’ and he assisted Richard Griffin, 3rd Baron Braybrooke in the fourth edition of the Diary of Samuel Pepys (1854).

== Legacy ==
Yeowell's books were sold with other collections by Sotheby, Wilkinson, & Hodge on 12 November 1873 and five following days. His collections for the biography of Englishmen went to the British Museum; they consisted of eleven folio volumes, thirty-seven octavo volumes, and eight parcels.
