= Joan Shakespeare =

Sister of William Shakespeare

Joan Hart (née Shakespeare; bapt. 15 April 1569 – buried 4 November 1646) was the sister of William Shakespeare. She is the only member of the family whose known descendants continue down to the present day.

== Life ==
Joan was William Shakespeare's younger sister. (Note: This Joan shared a name with her parents' deceased first-born child who was baptised 15 September 1558, but died shortly after. All of John and Mary's daughters—Joan, Anne, and Margaret—were named for Mary's sisters, and they were likely also the godparents.) She married a hatter named William Hart with whom she had four children, William (1600–1639), Mary (1603–1606), Thomas (1605–1661), and Michael (1608–1618).

She may have been a crypto-Catholic, the author of the "J. Shakespeare" who wrote a Catholic testament. (See Religious views of William Shakespeare § Shakespeare's family.)

Little is known about Joan's husband, William, apart from the fact that he was sued for debt in 1600 and 1601. He died in April 1616, and was buried 17 April, a week before William Shakespeare died. In his will her brother left her a legacy of £20, some clothing and the right to live in the western part of the double family house on Henley Street in Stratford for a nominal yearly rent of one shilling. She continued to reside there for the remainder of her life, dying at the age of 77.

Her son William never married. Her other descendants via Thomas lived in Stratford until 1806. Thomas inherited the Henley Street house known as Shakespeare's Birthplace. He had many descendants. By the 18th century Joan's descendants were identifying themselves as carrying the poet's family line. John Hart (1755–1800) was identified as "the 6th descendant of the poet Shakespeare" on his gravestone in Tewkesbury Abbey Churchyard, Gloucestershire.

== In literature ==
In her essay A Room of One's Own, Virginia Woolf created a character, "Judith Shakespeare", supposed to be Shakespeare's sister. In fact Judith was his daughter. It is unknown whether this was a mistake or a deliberate conflation of the two women. In her story Shakespeare's sister is denied the education of her brother despite her obvious talent as a writer. When her father tries to marry her off, she runs away to join a theatre company but is ultimately rejected because of her sex. She becomes pregnant, is abandoned by her partner and commits suicide.

A teenage Joan appears in Laurie Lawlor's novel The Two Loves of Will Shakespeare (2006), in which she is presented as an aspirant poet who resents the restrictions placed on her as a woman. She writes sonnets, one of which her brother plagiarises. She is in love with Richard Field, but he pursues Anne Whateley. In Shakespeare's Will, Vern Thiessen's speculative biographical play about Anne Hathaway, Joan is a "bitch" who is constantly interfering in Anne's life.

== Bibliography ==
- Campbell, Oscar James; Quinn, Edward G., eds. (1966). A Shakespeare Encyclopaedia. Methuen. ISBN 978-0416951806. OCLC 263538090. OL 20868677M.
- Chambers, E. K. (1930). William Shakespeare: A Study of Facts and Problems. Vol. II. Clarendon Press.
- Ezell, Margaret J. M. (1993). Writing Women's Literary History. Baltimore and London: Johns Hopkins University Press. ISBN 978-0801844324.
- Lawlor, Laurie (2006). The Two Loves of Will Shakespeare: A Novel. Holiday House. ISBN 978-0823419012. OL 24754980M.
- Nestruck, J. Kelly (15 July 2011). "Shakespeare's Will: In bed with the Shakespeares". The Globe and Mail.
- Schoenbaum, S. (1977). William Shakespeare: A Compact Documentary Life. Oxford: Clarendon Press. ISBN 0195051610.
- Wood, Michael (2015). "His Mother Mary Shakespeare". In Edmondson, Paul; Wells, Stanley (eds.). The Shakespeare Circle: An Alternative Biography. Cambridge: Cambridge University Press. pp. 13–25. doi:10.1017/CBO9781107286580.004. ISBN 978-1107286580 – via Cambridge Core.
