= Park Honan =

American academic (1928–2014)

Park Honan

Leonard Hobart Park Honan (17 September 1928 – 27 September 2014) was an American academic and author who spent most of his career in the UK. He wrote widely on the lives of authors and poets and published important biographies of such writers as Robert Browning, Matthew Arnold, Jane Austen, William Shakespeare and Christopher Marlowe.

Honan began his career specializing in Victorian literature but later broadened his scope, becoming an expert in the Elizabethan period. From 1959, he taught at Connecticut College and then Brown University before relocating permanently to England in 1968, where he taught at the University of Birmingham until becoming Professor of English and American Literature at the University of Leeds in 1984. He was elected a Fellow of the Royal Society of Literature.

== Early life and education ==
Honan was born in Utica, New York, the son of William Francis Honan, a thoracic surgeon of Irish descent, and Annette Neudecker Honan, a journalist of English descent. His brother was the journalist William Honan, who became culture editor of The New York Times. His father died in 1935, when Honan was seven years old, leaving his mother to raise their sons alone; she rented a small house in Bronxville, New York, where she felt the public schools were excellent. He earned a scholarship to Deep Springs College, a small school in the California desert. While at school, Honan worked as a butcher and a car mechanic, enjoying horseback riding and fascinated with the local reptiles. Of the butcher job, he said: "My boots used to be awash in four inches of blood in the slaughterhouse. That helped to make me a pacifist."

After two years Honan transferred to the University of Chicago, from which he received his BA and, in 1951, his MA. He continued to work in a variety of jobs, including as a publisher in New York. There he met, and in 1952 married, a French Fulbright scholar, Jeannette nee Colin (died 2009), and the couple eventually had three children: Corinna, a writer and editor, and twins Matthew and Natasha. Honan was drafted into the US army at the end of the Korean War, but as a conscientious objector, he refused to fight. He was jailed briefly, but allowed to serve in a non-combat role in France. Upon discharge, under the GI Bill, he qualified for a grant to study anywhere he chose. He moved with his wife and baby daughter to England in 1956 to study at the University of London, gaining the degree of Ph.D, with a thesis on Robert Browning, in 1959 (which was published in 1961 as Browning's Characters), while also writing a novel, two plays, poems, short stories and academic papers.

== Career ==
Honan produced several "scrupulously researched and often revelatory biographies" of subjects ranging from the Elizabethan period to the 20th century, drawing on previously unseen sources to reveal new facts, addressing his books "as much to the general reader as to the specialist." In addition to extensive work on Browning, numerous essays and contributions to various anthologies and collections, he wrote biographies of Matthew Arnold, Jane Austen, William Shakespeare and Christopher Marlowe. He also edited an anthology of Beat Generation writers. He was later interested in modernist writers and at the time of his death he had begun a biography of T. S. Eliot. He served on the editorial board of journals covering Browning and the Ohio University Press edition of Browning's complete works, as well as the journals Victorian Studies, Victorian Poetry, and Novel: A Forum on Fiction, among many others. According to his obituary in The Telegraph, "Honan passionately believed that a writer's life, family, friends and social background could all shed light on the work."

Honan began his teaching career as an assistant professor of English at Connecticut College in 1959, where his wife taught in the French department. He moved to Brown University in 1961. He relocated permanently to England, where he became a Lecturer at the University of Birmingham in 1968, remaining there as a Senior Lecturer, then Reader in English, until 1983. He was appointed Professor of English and American Literature at the University of Leeds in January 1985 and retired in 1993 with the title Emeritus Professor. The biographer John Batchelor described Honan as "a dazzlingly dramatic lecturer".

In 1998 Honan was elected a Fellow of the Royal Society of Literature (FRSL). He was given a Fellowship by the John Simon Guggenheim Memorial Foundation in 1962.

He died of liver cancer at the age of 86.

== Reputation ==
Kirk H. Beetz wrote in the Dictionary of Literary Biography that "Honan combines a multitude of previously unpublished facts about the personal lives and careers of his subjects with a narrative style that presents details in a coherent and fluid manner, thus pleasing general as well as scholarly readers". Honan described his intention thus: "One of the main efforts of our time has been to write contextualized biographies attentive to feeling as well as to ideas, objective and yet close, rooted in an 'historical present', alive to childhood, creativity, growth, and above all painstakingly accurate and not self-indulgent. I've tried to contribute to this." David Lodge wrote in The Guardian that Honan's work has "the effect, for the reader, of accompanying the biographical subject as she or he moves through time and space." In writing his "outstanding biographies of classic English writers", Honan had an "inexhaustible patience and a willingness to spend many years – to do anything, read everything and go anywhere". Honan "had a lifelong interest in drama and his work demonstrates a dramatist's skill at bringing personalities to life."

Professor Arthur Kincaid wrote that Honan's Browning's Characters is "one of the few books ... which can safely be recommended to undergraduates as sound Browning criticism." Paul Vitello, in The New York Times, noted that Honan's biography of Arnold "recast him as one of the most influential progressive voices of Victorian England". In the Los Angeles Times, Merle Rubin reviewed Honan's Austen biography, commenting that Honan "is able to correct errors of previous biographers and editors. His extensive research, including a close perusal of materials in the hands of Austen family descendants, yields significant details ... about her extended family, her confidantes, friends, and acquaintances. ... Honan fills in the details of [the] wider world." Edward T. Oakes called Honan's Austen biography "Marvelous ... succinct ... shrewd". In The Telegraph, Kathryn Hughes wrote that his Austen biography set "a daunting high-water mark" for future biographers.

Shakespeare scholar Stanley Wells thought Honan's Shakespeare book "the best biography in existence." Oakes found the Shakespeare biography "especially skillful in working up a full-bodied portrait of the man from Stratford ... for under Honan's ministrations the evidence proved to be more plentiful than one might initially suspect." Lodge explained that "by widening the focus of his study to take in all kinds of data about the social, historical, familial and topographical context of the playwright's life ... a more rounded portrait than the received one could be inferred." Of Honan's Marlowe biography, Wells wrote in The Guardian: "Honan ... is scrupulous in his re-examination of what is known and ingenious in the connections he makes between apparently disparate facts. ... A strength of Honan's book is his probing examination of the relationships between Marlowe's day-to-day life and his writings. ... [I]t is an elegantly written study which must now stand as the best overall biography of one of our most fascinating writers."

== Selected works ==
- Browning's Characters: A Study in Poetic Technique, Yale University Press, 1961
- (with William Irvine) The Book, the Ring, & the Poet: A Biography of Robert Browning, McGraw-Hill, 1974
- Matthew Arnold: A Life, Weidenfeld and Nicolson, 1981
- Jane Austen: Her Life, Weidenfeld and Nicolson 1987
- Honan, Park (ed.) The Beats: An Anthology of "Beat" Writing, Dent, 1987
- Authors' Lives: On Literary Biography and the Arts of Language (collection of essays), St. Martins Press, 1990
- Shakespeare: A Life, Oxford University Press 1998
- Christopher Marlowe: Poet & Spy, Oxford University Press 2005
