= Samuel Schoenbaum =

20th-century Shakespeare biographer and scholar

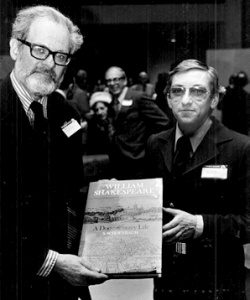
- Samuel Schoenbaum (left)
- Born: March 6, 1927; New York City, U.S.
- Died: March 27, 1996 (aged 69); Washington, D.C., U.S.
- Spouse: Marilyn Turk

Samuel Schoenbaum (March 6, 1927 – March 27, 1996) was an American Shakespearean biographer and scholar.

== Biography ==
Born in New York, Schoenbaum taught at Northwestern University from 1953 to 1975, serving for the last four years of this period as the Frank Bliss Snyder Professor of English Literature. He later taught at the City University of New York (1975–76).

He was the Distinguished Professor of Renaissance Studies at the University of Maryland (1976–93), director of UMD's Center for Renaissance and Baroque Studies (1981–96), president of the Shakespeare Association of America, vice president of the International Shakespeare Association, and editor of the journal Renaissance Drama. At one point in his career he was a trustee of the Folger Shakespeare Library and was an American consultant for the Oxford University Shakespeare Project.

He managed to uncover previously unrecorded manuscripts and biographical records pertaining not only to Shakespeare but also to other writers, including Samuel Taylor Coleridge and William Wordsworth.

Schoenbaum married the former Marilyn Turk in 1946. In his later years he suffered from multiple sclerosis. He died of prostate cancer in Washington, D.C. in 1996, aged 69.

== Works ==
- Jacobean Danse Macabre: A Consideration of "The Revengers Tragedy" (1949)
- Middleton's Tragedies (1955)
- Internal Evidence and Elizabethan Dramatic Authorship (1966)
- Essays Principally on Dramatic Theory and Form (1966)
- Shakespeare's Lives (1970; 2nd ed., 1991)
- Shakespeare: A Documentary Life (1974)
- Shakespeare, the Globe & the world (1979)
- William Shakespeare, Records and Images (1981)
- Shakespeare and Others (1985)
- William Shakespeare: A Compact Documentary Life (1987)
- Shakespeare: His Life, His English, His Theater (1990)
