= Shakespeare (disambiguation) =

William Shakespeare (1564–1616) was an English playwright and poet.

Shakespeare may also refer to:

== Places ==
- Shakespeare, Ontario, Canada, a village and designated place
- Shakespeare, New Mexico, United States, a ghost town
- 2985 Shakespeare, an asteroid
- Shakespeare (lunar crater), a crater on the Moon
- Shakespeare (Mercurian crater), a crater on Mercury
- Shakespeare quadrangle, a region on Mercury
- Shakespeare Cliff, near Dover, England, former location of Shakespeare Cliff Halt railway station
- Shakespeare Shoulder, a mountain in Alaska, US

== Arts and entertainment ==
- Shakespeare (album), a 2010 album by Anthony Jeselnik
- Shakespeare: The Animated Tales, an animated television series
- Shakespeare, a meerkat on Meerkat Manor
- "Shakespeare", a song by Akala
- "Shakespeare", a song by Miranda Cosgrove from her 2010 album Sparks Fly
- Kent Shakespeare, a DC Comics hero
- Shakespeare (Anthony Burgess), a biographical and critical study of William Shakespeare by Burgess

== Other uses ==
- Shakespeare (surname)
- HMS Shakespeare, a list of ships
  - HMS Shakespeare (1917), a Thornycroft type destroyer leader launched in 1917
  - HMS Shakespeare (P221), an S-class submarine launched in 1941
- Shakespeare baronets, a title in the Baronetage of the United Kingdom
- Shakespeare Bridge, Los Angeles, California
- Shakespeare Fishing Tackle
- Shakespeare Institute, University of Birmingham, Stratford-upon-Avon, United Kingdom
- Shakespeare Line, an alternative name for the North Warwickshire Line, a railway line
- Shakespeare Programming Language
- William Hill (This Is Us), a fictional character nicknamed "Shakespeare"

== See also ==
- Shakespeare and Company (disambiguation)
- Shakespeare by the Sea (disambiguation)
- Shakespeare Company (disambiguation)
- Shakespeare Garden (disambiguation)
- Shakespeare Songs (disambiguation)
- Shakespeare Theatre (disambiguation)
- Shakespeare's Sister (disambiguation)
- Shepseskare, an Ancient Egyptian king

=== Related ===
- Shakespear (disambiguation)
- William Shakespeare (disambiguation)
