= Manyo =

Manyo may refer to:

People

- Thomas Aquino Manyo Maeda (born 1949), Japanese prelate of the Catholic Church
- Manyo Plange (born 1988), Ghanaian boxer who won silver at the 2007 All-Africa Games

Africa

- Manyo County, county in the Western Nile, South Sudan
- Manyo language, a Bantu language spoken along the Okavango River in Namibia, Botswana and Angola

Japan

- Manyo Botanical Garden, a Japanese form of botanical garden that contains every form of plant mentioned in the Man'yōshū poetry anthology
- Nara Prefecture Complex of Manyo Culture, a museum in Asuka Village, Nara Prefecture in Japan
- Michinoku Mano-Manyo Botanical Garden, was a botanical garden in Kashima, Fukushima, Japan
- Futagami Manyo Botanical Gardens, botanical gardens in Takaoka, Toyama, Japan
- Manyo Botanical Garden, Nara, botanical garden next to the Kasuga Shrine at 160 Kasugano-cho, Nara, Nara, Japan

== See also ==
- Manyoni
- Manyosen
