= Manyō-no-Mori Park =

Park in Shizuoka Prefecture, Japan

- 万葉の森公園
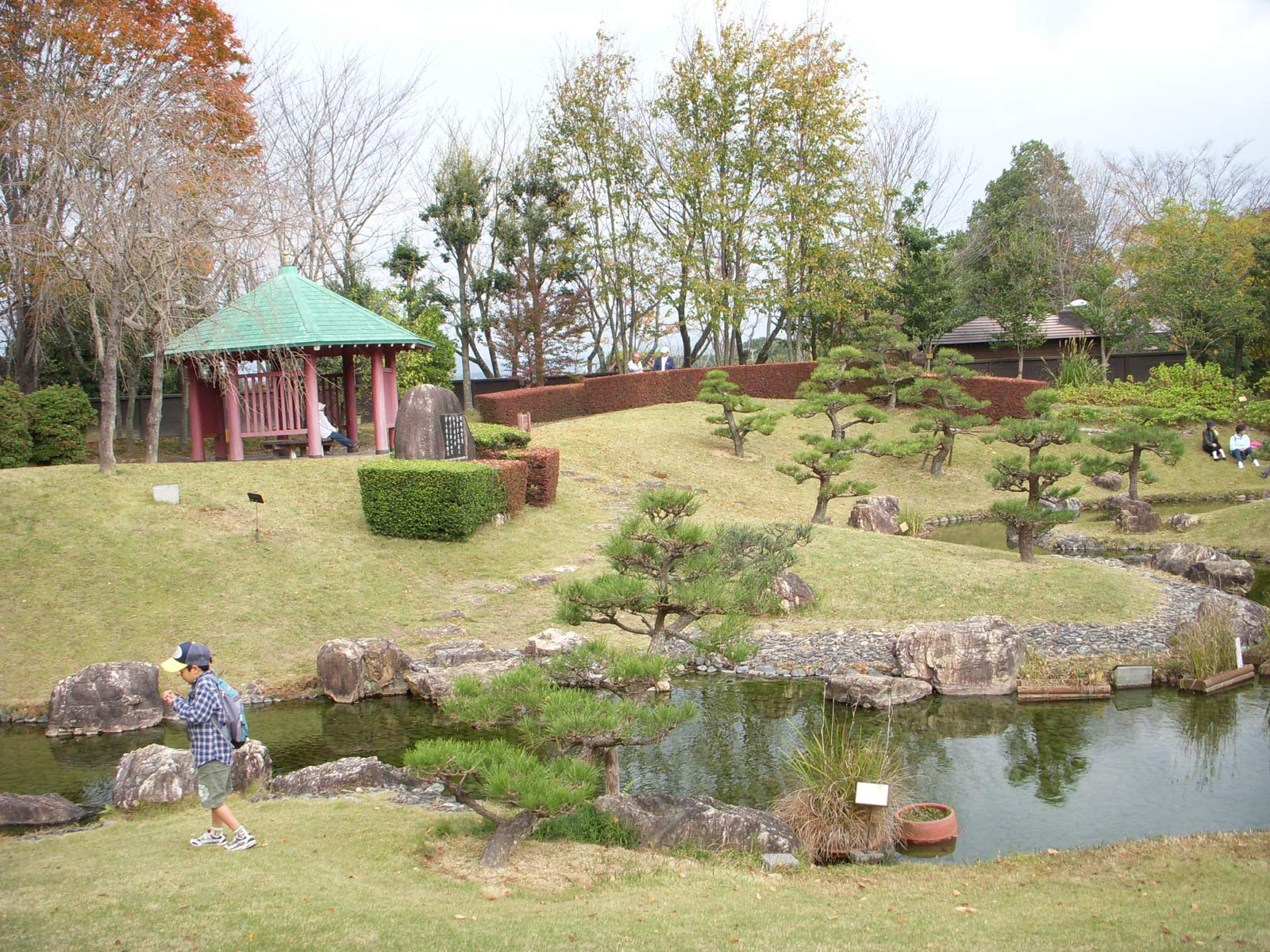
- Interactive map of Manyō-no-Mori Park
- Location: 5055-1 Hirakuchi, Hamana-ku, Hamamatsu, Shizuoka Prefecture, Japan
- Coordinates: 34°48′07″N 137°45′38″E
- Opened: 1992
- Website: Official website (ja)

Manyō-no-Mori Park (万葉の森公園, Manyō-no-mori Kōen) opened in Hamamatsu, Shizuoka Prefecture, Japan in 1992. The park takes its name from the Man'yōshū anthology of poems, four of which relate to the area. Within, as well as some three hundred kinds of plant featured in the anthology according to different theories as to their identification, there is a museum space with materials on Man'yō life and culture, facilities for experiencing Nara period cuisine and plant dyeing, a camellia garden, and an hinoki forest.

== See also ==
- Manyo Botanical Garden, Nara
- Shimane Prefectural Manyō Park
- Futagami Manyo Botanical Gardens
