= William Shakespeare (disambiguation) =

William Shakespeare (1564–1616) was an English poet, playwright and actor.

William Shakespeare may also refer to:

== People ==
- William Shakespeare (tenor) (1849–1931), English tenor singer, pedagogue, and composer
- William Shakespeare (inventor) (1869–1950), inventor of the level-winding fishing reel
- William Shakespear (explorer) (1878–1915), explorer of the Arabian Peninsula
- William Harold Nelson Shakespeare (1893–1976), British aviator and sportsman
- William Shakespeare (American football) (1912–1974), American football player, a.k.a. Bill Shakespeare
- William Geoffrey Shakespeare (1927–1996), 2nd Baronet Shakespeare of Lakenham, a general practitioner (physician)
- William Shakespeare (Australian singer) (1948–2010), stage name of Australian singer John Stanley Cave, a.k.a. Billy Shake

== Other uses ==
- William Shakespeare (essay), an 1864 book-length essay by Victor Hugo
- Will Shakespeare (TV series), an ITC Entertainment TV series about the playwright
- The William Shakespeare, a British Railways train during the 1951 Festival of Britain

== See also ==
- Shakespeare (surname)
- Shakespeare (disambiguation)
- William Shakespeare Burton (1824–1916), Victorian painter
