= Shakespeare (surname) =

Shakespeare is an English family name most commonly associated with William Shakespeare (1564–1616), an English playwright and poet. Other notable people with the surname include:

== Related to the playwright ==
- Anne Hathaway (wife of Shakespeare) (c. 1555–c. 1623), his wife
- Richard Shakespeare (1490–c. 1561), his paternal grandfather
- John Shakespeare (c. 1531–1601), his father
- Mary Shakespeare (c. 1537–1608), his mother
- Gilbert Shakespeare (1566–c. 1612), his brother
- Joan Shakespeare (1569–1646), his sister
- Edmund Shakespeare (1580–1607), his youngest brother and an actor
- Susanna Shakespeare (c. 1583–1649), his daughter
- Judith Shakespeare (c. 1585–c. 1662), his daughter
- Hamnet Shakespeare (c. 1585–c. 1596), his son

== Others ==
- Abraham Shakespeare (c. 1966–2009), American lottery winner and murder victim
- Clive Shakespeare (1949–2012), English-born Australian pop guitarist, songwriter, and producer
- Craig Shakespeare (1963–2024), English association football player and manager
- Frank Shakespeare (1925–2022), American diplomat and media executive
- Frank Shakespeare (rower) (born 1930), American rower
- Sir Geoffrey Shakespeare, 1st Baronet (1893–1980), British Liberal politician
- James Shakespeare (c. 1840–1912), South Australian organist
- Joseph A. Shakspeare (1837–1896), mayor of New Orleans
- Nicholas Shakespeare (born 1957), British novelist and biographer
- Noah Shakespeare (1839–1921), Canadian politician noted for his involvement in the anti-Chinese movement
- Olivia Shakespear (1863–1938), British novelist and playwright
- Percy Shakespeare (1906–1943), British painter
- Robbie Shakespeare (1953–2021), Jamaican musician and producer, of Sly and Robbie
- Stanley Shakespeare (1963–2005), American football player
- Stephan Shakespeare (born 1957), founder of market research company YouGov and of 18 Doughty Street
- Thomas Mitchell Shakespeare (1873–1938), Australian politician and newspaperman
- Tom Shakespeare, 3rd Baronet (born 1966), geneticist and sociologist
- William Shakespeare (American football) (1912–1975), American football player
- William Shakespeare (Australian singer) (1948–2010), stage name of John Cave (also known as John Cabe or Billy Shake)
- William Shakespeare (tenor) (1849–1931), English singer, pedagogue, and composer
- William Geoffrey Shakespeare (1927–1996), 2nd Baronet Shakespeare of Lakenham, general practitioner in Aylesbury
- William Harold Nelson Shakespeare (1883–1976), cricketer for Worcestershire in the interwar period

== See also ==
- Shakespear (disambiguation)
