= Inaba Manyō Historical Museum =

Museum in Tottori, Tottori, Japan

- 因幡万葉歴史館
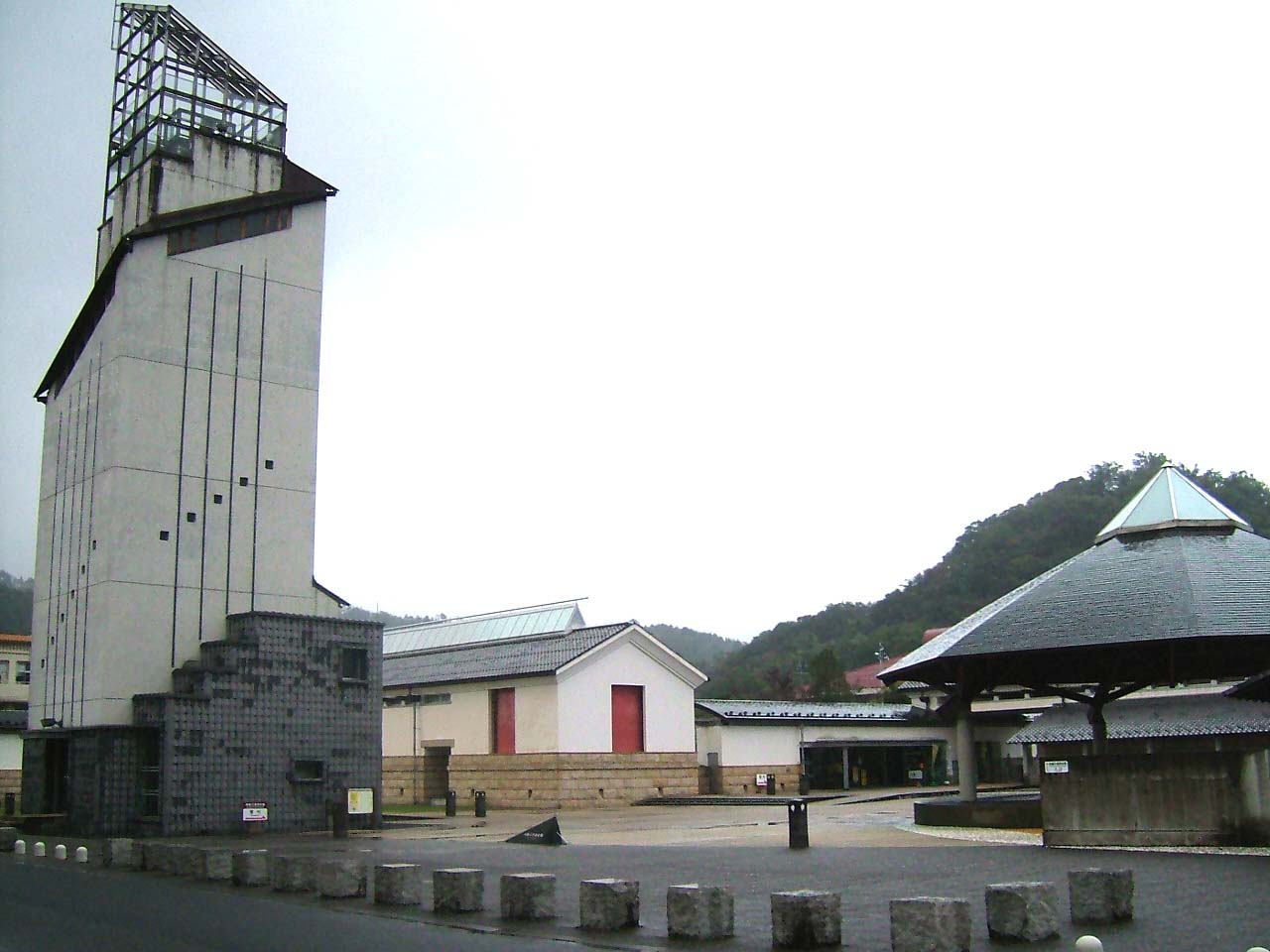
- Interactive map of the Inaba Manyō Historical Museum area

General information
- Location: 726 Machiya, Kokufu-chō, Tottori, Tottori Prefecture, Japan
- Coordinates: 35°28′23″N 134°16′29″E
- Opened: 30 October 1994

Website
- Official website (ja)

Inaba Manyō Historical Museum (因幡万葉歴史館, Inaba Manyō Rekishi-kan) opened in Tottori, Tottori Prefecture, Japan in 1994. Poet and presumed Man'yōshū compiler Ōtomo no Yakamochi was appointed Governor of Inaba Province, now the eastern half of the prefecture of Tottori, in 758 and composed the latest-dated and final poem in the anthology the following New Year's Day; the museum is located close to the site of the ancient Inaba Provincial Capital. The permanent exhibition, featuring replicas as well as historic materials, has displays relating to Ōtomo no Yakamochi and the poets of the Man'yōshū; Man'yō culture, including dyeing and weaving, music and dance, and cuisine; Inaba Province, Inaba Kokubun-ji, and Kajiyama Kofun; Ifukibe no Tokotari-hime; and the local Kirin lion dance. There is also a stroll garden with fifty different plants that feature in the anthology.

== See also ==
- Nara Prefecture Complex of Man'yo Culture
- Takaoka Manyō Historical Museum
- Shimane Prefectural Manyō Park
- Tottori City Historical Museum
- Hōki Province
