= Shakespeare Garden (disambiguation) =

Shakespeare Garden may refer to:

the general type, Shakespeare garden

or specifically to:

in the United States

- Shakespeare Garden (Evanston, Illinois), listed on the NRHP in Evanston, Illinois
- Shakespeare Garden of Cleveland, in Cleveland, Ohio, described at Shakespeare garden#Cleveland
- Shakespeare Garden and Shay House, Wessington Springs, South Dakota, listed on the NRHP in South Dakota
