= Man'yō botanical garden =

Type of Japanese garden inspired by the Man'yōshū

A Man'yō botanical garden is a Japanese form of botanical garden that attempts to contain every species and variety of plant mentioned in the Nara period Man'yōshū poetry anthology. It is somewhat similar to a Shakespeare garden in the English-speaking world.

Specific Man'yō gardens include:

- Akatsuka Botanical Garden
- Futagami Manyo Botanical Gardens
- Michinoku Mano-Manyo Botanical Garden
- Manyo Botanical Garden, Nara
