= Takaoka Manyō Historical Museum =

Museum in Takaoka, Toyama, Japan

- 高岡市万葉歴史館
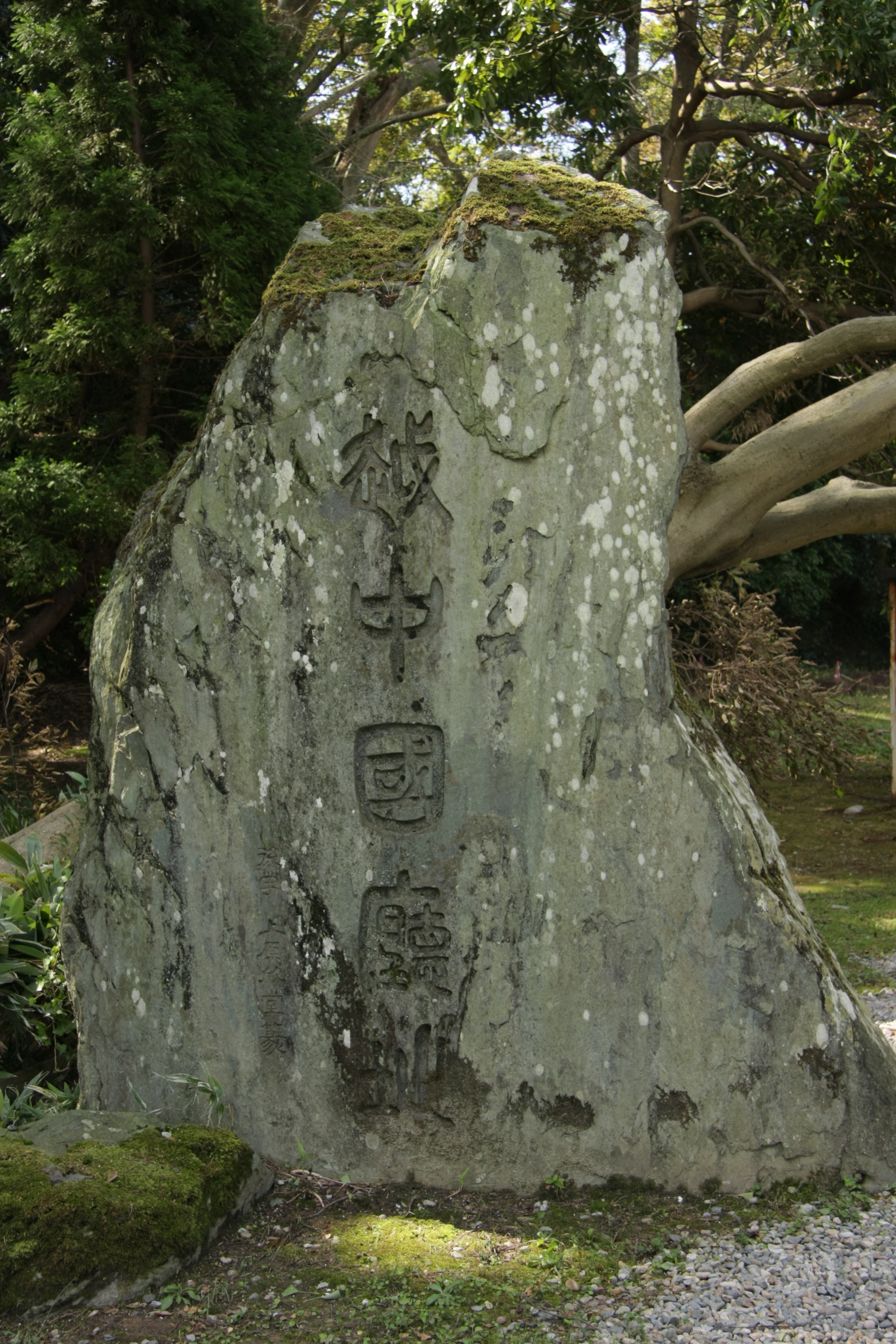
- stele at the site of the provincial government of Etchū Province
- Interactive map of the Takaoka Manyō Historical Museum area

General information
- Location: 1-11-11 Fushiki Ichinomiya, Takaoka, Toyama Prefecture, Japan
- Coordinates: 36°47′44″N 137°02′46″E
- Opened: 28 October 1990

Website
- Official website (ja)

Takaoka Manyō Historical Museum (高岡市万葉歴史館, Takaoka-shi Manyō Rekishi-kan) opened in Takaoka, Toyama Prefecture, Japan in 1990. Poet and presumed Man'yōshū compiler Ōtomo no Yakamochi was Governor of Etchū Province, now the prefecture of Toyama, from 746 to 751 and composed many poems during this time; the museum is located close to the site of the ancient provincial capital. The museum's displays and events have a particular focus on Etchū's connections with the anthology, there is a library with some eighty-five thousand volumes on the Man'yōshū and early literature, and the gardens are planted with associated flowers and trees.

== See also ==
- Nara Prefecture Complex of Man'yo Culture
- Ishikawa Takeyoshi Memorial Library
- Manyo Botanical Garden, Nara
