= Inaba Provincial Capital =

Inaba Provincial Capital Site
- 因幡国庁跡 (Japanese)
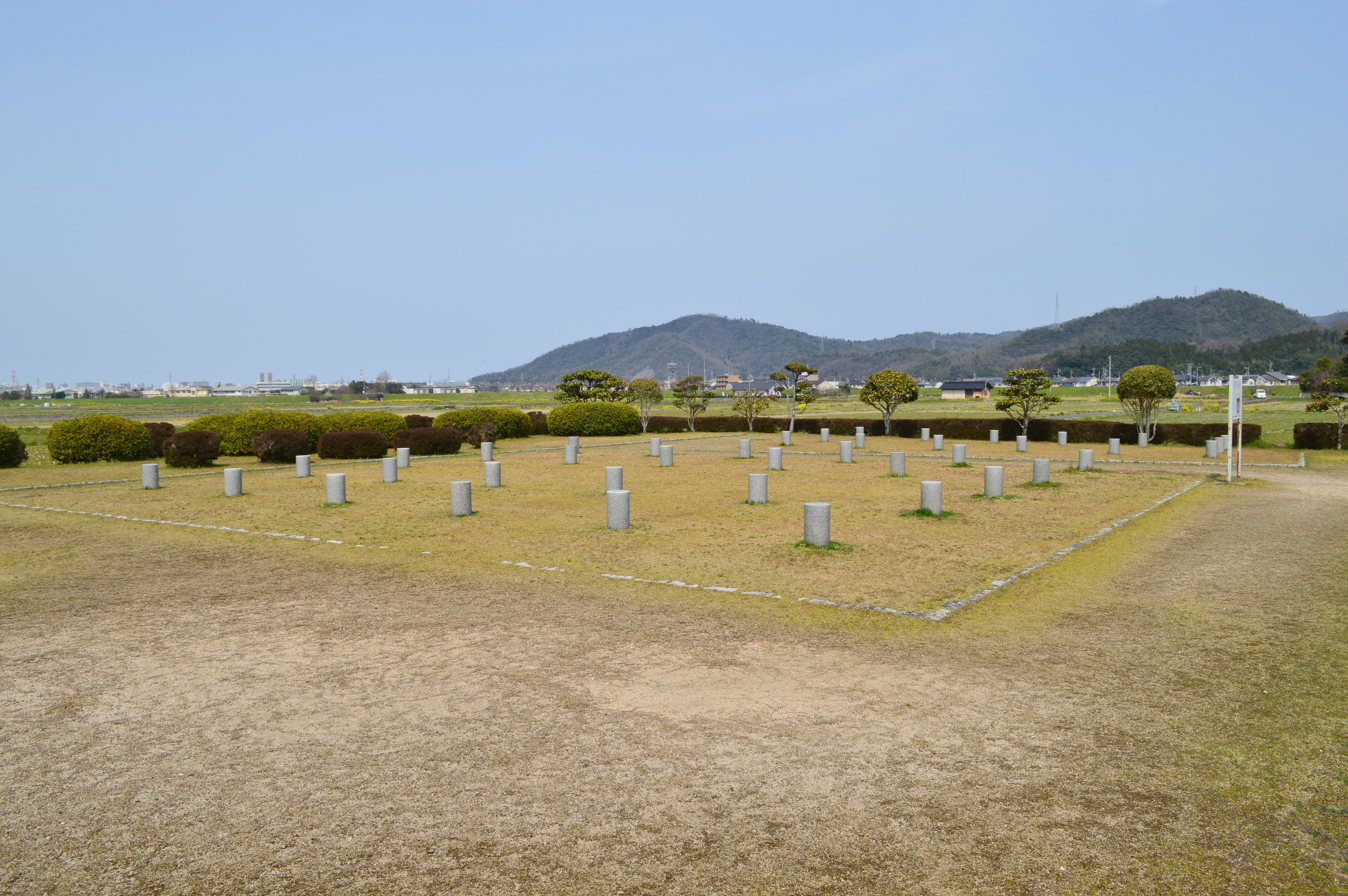
- Inaba Provincial Capital Site

- Inaba Provincial Capital Site Inaba Provincial Capital (Japan)
- 35°28′30.4″N 134°15′58.0″E
- Type: Kokufu ruin
- Location: Tottori, Japan
- Region: San'in region

History
- Built: Heian period

Site notes
- Condition: ruins
- Public access: Yes (park and museum)

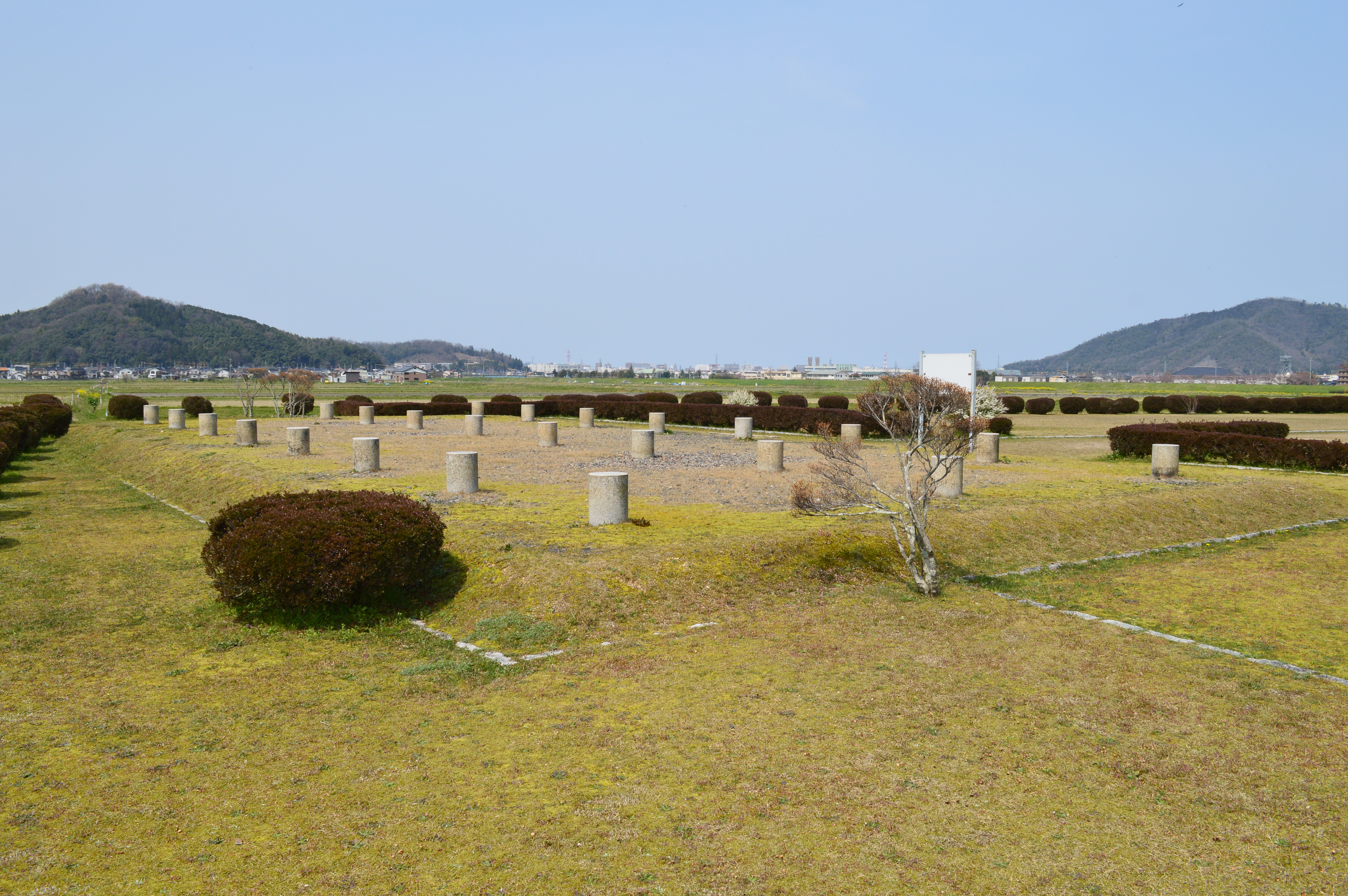
Shown from the South Gate

The Inaba Provincial Capital Site (因幡国庁跡, Inaba Kokufu ato) is an archaeological site consisting of the ruins of the Nara period to early Heian period Provincial Capital of Inaba Province, located in the Nakago, Kokufu neighborhood of the city of Tottori, Tottori Prefecture in the San'in region of Japan. The site was designated a National Historic Site of Japan in 1978.

== Overview ==
Following the Taika Reform (645 AD) which aimed at a centralization of the administration following the Chinese model (ritsuryō), provincial capitals were established in the various provinces, headed by an official titled kokushi, who replaced the older Kuni no miyatsuko. With a square layout, the provincial capitals were patterned after the Capital of Japan, first Fujiwara-kyō and then Heijō-kyō, which in turn were modelled on the Tang capital Chang'an, but on a much, much smaller scale. Each had office buildings for administration, finance, police and military and the official building of the governor, as well as granaries for tax rice and other taxable produce. In the periphery there was the provincial temple (kokubun-ji), and nunnery (kokubun-niji) and the garrison. This system collapsed with the growth of feudalism in the Late Heian period, and the location of many of the provincial capitals is now lost.

The Inaba Provincial Capital was located about 10 kilometers east of the center of modern Tottori city, and the Inaba Manyō Historical Museum is located nearby. The location had been lost for many centuries, but it was suspected to have been located in an area that included Fukube Village in Iwami District and Kokufu Town (now part of the city of Tottori), due to the survival of a number of local place names which are closely related to the provincial government. The foundations of buildings was discovered in 1973 in connection with a farmland improvement project, and archaeological excavation survey in 1977 uncovered a block of buildings presumed to be very close to the center of the national government office. During excavations, the foundation of more than 10 pillar-supported buildings, two fences, two wells, several roads and ditches were found. The central building was a five by four bay structure with double-sided eaves. About 750 meters south of the central hall, were the foundation of the eastern and western buildings with a seven by three bay layout, which appear to be at the southern limit of the national government office complex. Artifacts found include inkstones, title seals, wooden strips, earthenware with ink writing, and green pottery. The dates of these remains are from the early Heian period, based on the inscription "Ninna 2nd Year" (886 AD) excavated on a wooden tag fragment from a nearby ditch.

After being designated as a historic site, about 7,000 square meters of the total area of 32,000 square meters has been maintained as a historic park. Some of the excavated items are on display at the Prefectural Museum.

== See also ==
- List of Historic Sites of Japan (Tottori)
