= Kajiyama Kofun =

- 梶山古墳 (Japanese)
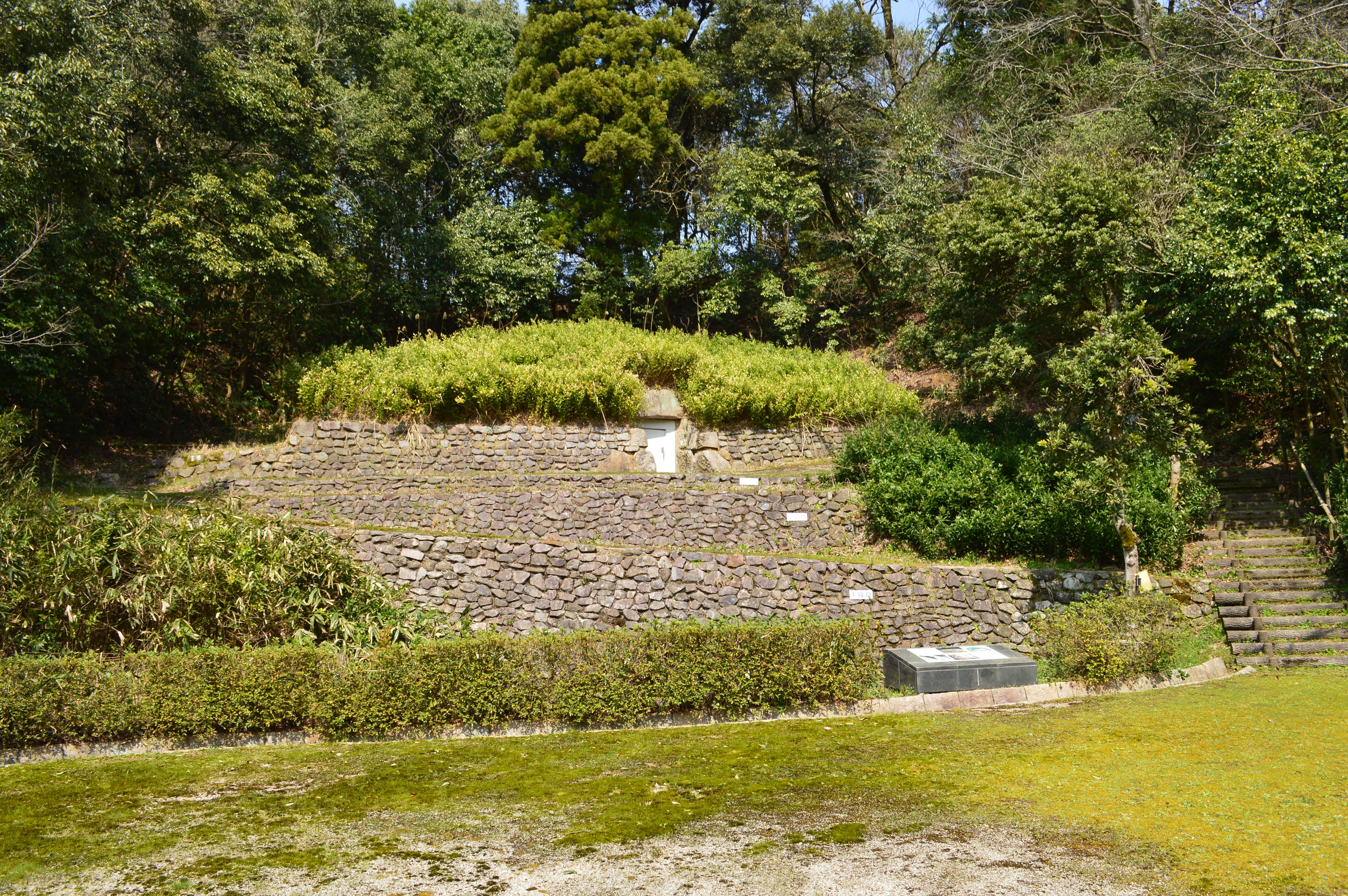
- Kajiyama Kofun

- Kajiyama Kofun Kajiyama Kofun (Japan)
- Interactive map of Kajiyama Kofun
- 35°27′5.39″N 134°17′41″E
- Type: kofun
- Periods: Kofun period
- Location: Tottori, Tottori Prefecture Japan
- Region: San'in region

History
- Built: late 6th to early 7th century AD

Site notes
- Public access: Yes (museum)

Kajiyama Kofun mural

The Kajiyama Kofun (梶山古墳) is a Kofun period burial mound located in the Okamasu, Kokufucho, neighborhood of the city of Tottori, Tottori Prefecture in the San'in region of Japan. The tumulus was designated a National Historic Site of Japan in 1979.

== Overview ==
The Kokufucho area of Tottori city has numerous ancient burial mounds in the valleys of small hills which have been known for a long time; some were once used as air-raid shelters during World War II. The Kajiyama Kofun is located in horseshoe-shaped recess about 40 meters wide on the south side of a hill. The tumulus is 17 meters in diagonal length and has a modified octagonal shape (八角形墳) with sides of 2.5 to 8.5 meters. The tumulus is orientated to the south, and in front of the entry a square platform two meters long and 14 meters wide for rituals is built over three levels with basalt stone walls. The horizontal stone burial chamber is made of cut tuff. It consists of a burial chamber itself, a gate, and an antechamber with a total length of 9.2 meters. The burial chamber measures 2.35 meters in length, 1.37 meters in width, and 1.6 meters in height. Both sides of the entrance gate are made of stone, and there is an indentation in the front for fitting a door stone. In the 1978 excavation, a colored mural in red-yellow colors was discovered on the back wall of the burial chamber. On the upper part of the mural, are a triangular pattern and a concentric circle pattern symmetrically drawn in thin lines, and in the middle is a curved pattern of unknown design and a fish, 53-cm long, believed to have been a salmon or carp. Further down, there are two circles with a diameter of about 40 cm. Motifs such as triangular, circular, concentric circles, and fish are seen in decorated burial mounds in various parts of Japan, including the Kyushu region. Based on excavated artifacts such as Sue ware, Haji ware fragments, iron swords, metal fittings, thin gold-plates and the structure of the stone chamber, it is estimated to have been built between the latter half of the 6th century and the 7th century. The elaborate technique of cut stone in the stone chamber and the technique of the mural painting show a strong influence of continental culture. It is unknown who was buried in this tomb, but there is a theory that it was Prince Asagi, a member of the imperial family who was exiled to Inaba in 675. Based on the discoveries made during the excavation, the tumulus has been reconstructed with a modified octagonal mound and square altar. The burial chamber, formerly open and used by children as a playground, now has a door to preserve the wall paintings. It is now open to the public for about three days in spring or autumn when the temperature difference between the outside and the stone chamber is small. In addition, a full-size replica of the burial chamber is displayed at the nearby Inaba Manyō Historical Museum (因幡万葉歴史館).

The tumulus is located twenty-minute by car from Tottori Station on the JR West San'in Main Line.

== See also ==
- List of Historic Sites of Japan (Tottori)
