= Akatsuka Botanical Garden =

Botanical garden in Tokyo, Japan

Coordinates: 35°46′50″N 139°38′39″E

The Akatsuka Botanical Garden (板橋区立赤塚植物園, Itabashi Kuritsu Akatsuka Shokubutsuen) is a botanical garden located at 5-17-14 Akatsuka, Itabashi, Tokyo, Japan. It is open daily.

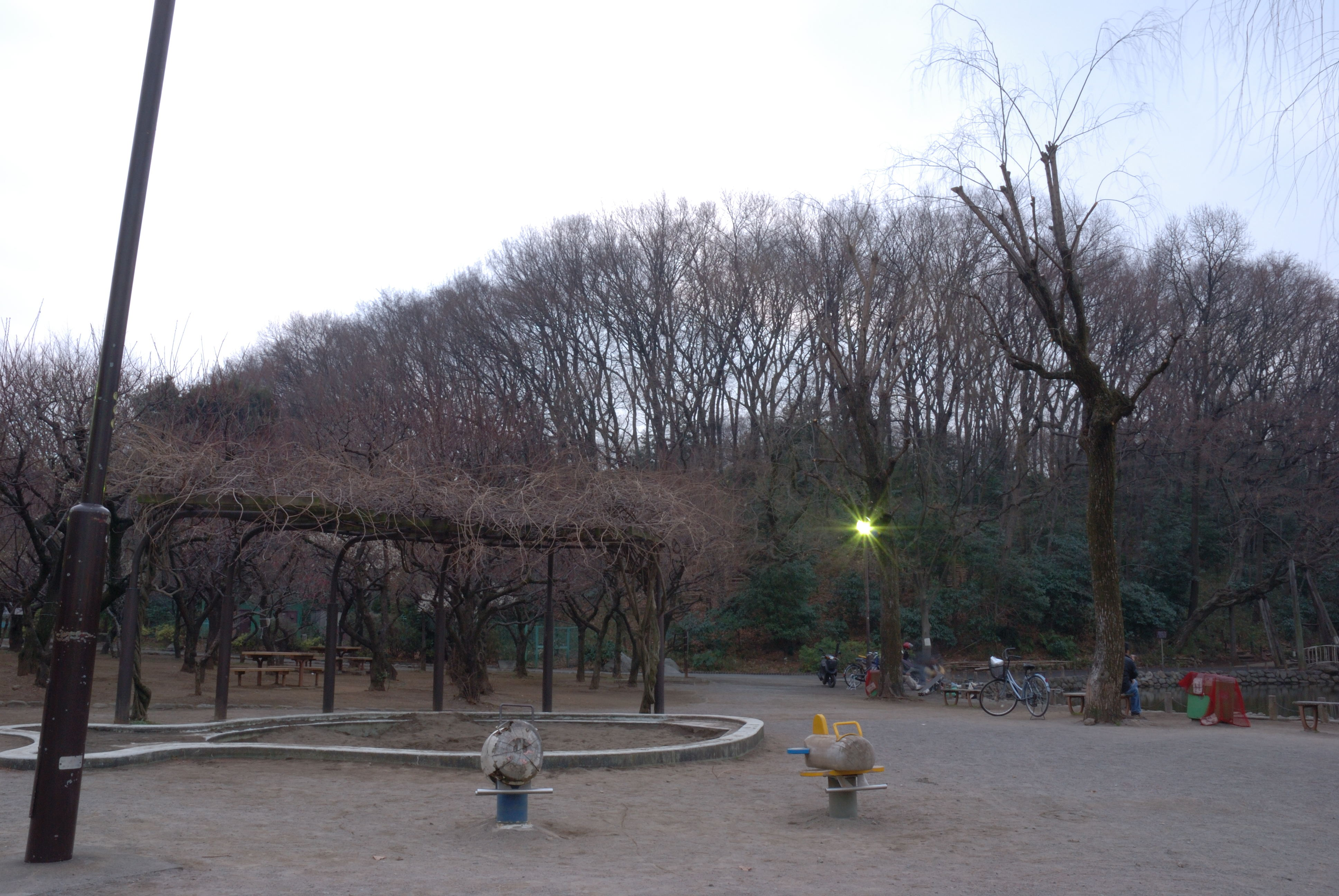
Aboutv600 varieties of plant in Akatsuka castle

The garden is located in Akatsuka's hills and contains over 600 varieties of trees and plants. The Manyo Yakuyo Garden is a Manyo Botanical Garden containing medicinal herbs mentioned in the Man'yōshū anthology.

== See also ==
- List of botanical gardens in Japan
