= Shimane Prefectural Manyō Park =

Park in Masuda, Shimane, Japan

- 島根県立万葉公園
- Interactive map of Shimane Prefectural Manyō Park
- Location: 2402-1 Takatsu-chō, Masuda, Shimane Prefecture, Japan
- Coordinates: 34°40′45″N 131°48′48″E
- Opened: September 1982
- Website: Official website

Shimane Prefectural Manyō Park (島根県立万葉公園, Shimane Kenritsu Manyō Kōen) is a park in Masuda, Shimane Prefecture, Japan. The park takes its name from the Man'yōshū, drawing on the historic connections between Kakinomoto no Hitomaro and Iwami Province, and includes within it a botanical garden with 153 of the species of plant that are named in the anthology.

== See also ==
- Manyo Botanical Garden, Nara
- Futagami Manyo Botanical Gardens
