= Shakespeare's Sister =

Shakespeare's Sister can refer to:

- Shakespears Sister, a British alternative pop group featuring Siobhan Fahey
- "Shakespeare's Sister" (song), a 1985 song by The Smiths
- A section of the essay A Room of One's Own by Virginia Woolf
- Joan Shakespeare, (1569–1646) the sister of William Shakespeare
