= Shakespear =

Shakespear may refer to:

- William Shakespeare, famous English playwright, as a variant spelling of his name

== People ==
- Dorothy Shakespear (1886–1973), English artist
- Ethel Shakespear (1871–1946), English geologist, public servant and philanthropist
- Henry Shakespear Thuillier (1895–1982), British Army officer
- Hugh Shakespear Barnes (1853–1940), British administrator in India
- John Shakespear (1774–1858), English orientalist
- John Shakespear (British Army officer) (1861–1942), British Army officer in India
- Olivia Shakespear (1863–1938), British novelist and playwright
- Peter Shakespear (born 1948), Australian rower
- Richmond Shakespear (1812–1861), Indian-born British Indian Army officer
- Ronald Shakespear (born 1941), Argentine graphic designer.
- William Shakespear (explorer) (1878–1915), British civil servant and explorer
- Wilma Shakespear (born 1943), Australian netball players

== Other uses ==
- Shakespear Regional Park, a nature park at the tip of the Whangaparaoa Peninsula, New Zealand
- Shakespears Sister, a British pop-rock project

== See also ==
- Shakespeare (disambiguation)
