= Tom Shakespeare =

British sociologist (born 1966)

Sir Tom Shakespeare Bt CBE FBA
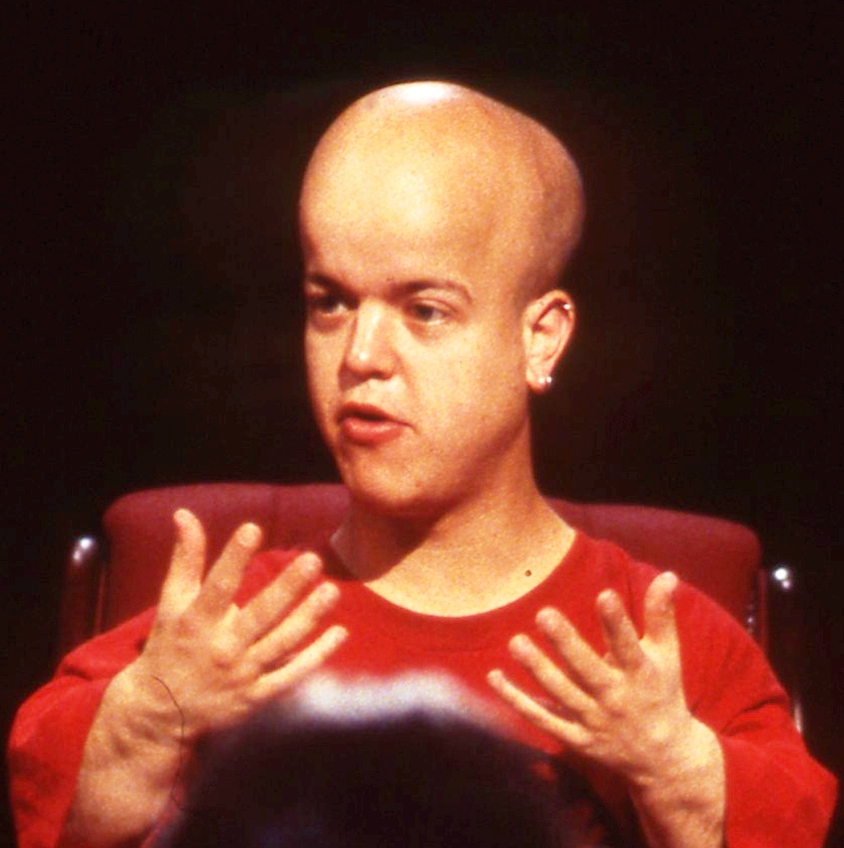
- Shakespeare in 1994
- Born: 11 May 1966 (age 60)
- Children: 2
- Relatives: Geoffrey Shakespeare (grandfather); Nigel Fisher (half-uncle)

Academic background
- Education: Radley College
- Alma mater: Pembroke College, Cambridge; King's College, Cambridge

Academic work
- Discipline: Sociology
- Sub-discipline: Disability rights; Bioethics
- Institutions: University of Sunderland; Newcastle University; University of Leeds; World Health Organization; University of East Anglia; London School of Hygiene & Tropical Medicine

Sir Thomas William Shakespeare, 3rd Baronet CBE, FBA (born 11 May 1966) is an expert on disability rights, genetics and bioethics, as well as an author of two fiction novels. He has achondroplasia and uses a wheelchair.

== Early life and education ==
Shakespeare's grandfather, Sir Geoffrey Shakespeare, was made a baronet following long service as a Member of Parliament for Norwich from 1929–1945, occupying various senior government roles. When his father, Sir William Geoffrey Shakespeare, died in 1996, Tom Shakespeare inherited his baronetcy, but does not use the title "Sir". His mother Susan Mary, daughter of A. Douglas Raffel, of Colombo, Sri Lanka, was a nurse of Sri Lankan Burgher descent.

Shakespeare's younger brother is Canon James Douglas Geoffrey Shakespeare, vicar of St John the Evangelist church, Cherry Hinton, Cambridge. His father's maternal half-brother was Conservative politician Sir Nigel Fisher.

While still a student, Shakespeare was featured in a television documentary by Lord Snowdon connected to his 1976 report "Integrating the Disabled" about his restricted growth, along with his father, a prominent medical practitioner, who was also born with achondroplasia.

Shakespeare was educated at Radley College, Oxfordshire, taking A-levels in English, History, and History of Art; and at Pembroke College, Cambridge, where he matriculated in 1984 to read Anglo-Saxon, Norse and Celtic, completing Part 1 of that tripos in 1986 before switching to read Social and Political Sciences in Part II, graduating in 1987 with a BA Hons in Sociology.

Shakespeare returned to Cambridge in 1989, shifting to King's College, Cambridge, where he completed a PhD in Sociology in 1995. While at university, he was active in student politics, including as Campaigns Officer for Cambridge University Student Union (1986–1987).

== Career ==
=== Academic positions and disability expertise ===
Shakespeare lectured in sociology at the University of Sunderland (1992–1995), and was Research Fellow at the University of Leeds (1996–1999). He was Director of Outreach and Research Fellow at the Policy, Ethics and Life Sciences Research Institute, Newcastle University (1999–2005) and later Senior Research Fellow.

Shakespeare was a Technical Officer in the Disability and Research Team at the World Health Organization (WHO) from 2008 to 2013, and based in Geneva. He was a coauthor and coeditor of the 2011 World Report on Disability, published by WHO and the World Bank.

He was Professor of Disability Research at Norwich Medical School, University of East Anglia (UEA) from 2013 to 2018. At UEA, his research included group singing and its beneficial effects against depression and anxiety; the findings were published in the academic journal Medical Humanities.

Since 2018 Shakespeare has been Professor of Disability Research in the medical faculty at the London School of Hygiene and Tropical Medicine. His work includes research on disability in sub-Saharan Africa and South Asia.

In 2025 Shakespeare was appointed co-chair of the Disability and Health Commission of the International Centre for Evidence in Disability (ICED) at the London School of Hygiene and Tropical Medicine.

Shakespeare was a member of the Nuffield Council on Bioethics from 2013 to 2019 during which time he worked on ideas about naturalness in debates about science, technology and medicine and chaired the Council's working group on Non-Invasive Prenatal Testing (NIPT) which published guidelines on the ethical implications of screening for genetic conditions in pregnancy in 2017.

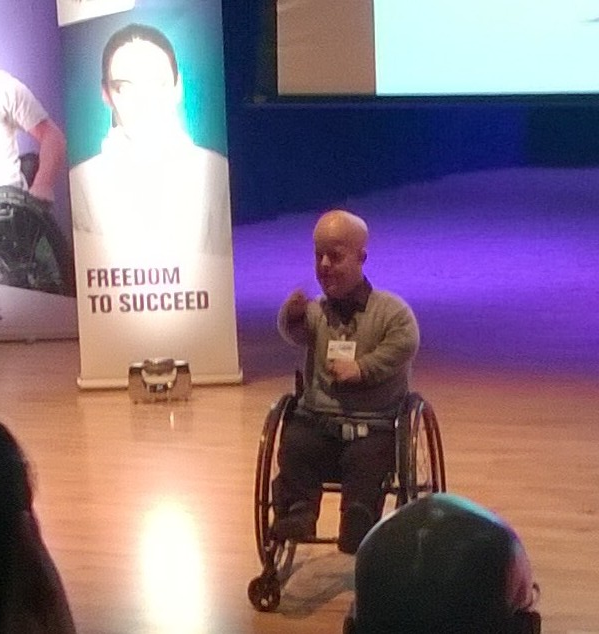
Shakespeare giving a speech at De Montfort University in 2017

In his writing on disability and public commentary, Shakespeare has at times challenged disability orthodoxy on issues such as the social model of disability, assisted dying, and selective abortion, and emphasised the importance of evidence.

=== Publications ===
Shakespeare's books on disability include:

- The Sexual Politics of Disability (1996) (co-authored)
- Disability Rights and Wrongs (2006) and Disability Rights and Wrongs Revisited (2014)
- Disability – the Basics (2017)
- Genetic Politics: From Eugenics to Genome (Issues in Social Policy) (2002), co-authored with Anne Kerr

He edited Arguing About Disability (2010, Routledge).

He has published two fictional novels which feature protagonists with disabilities, The Ha Ha (2024) and The Ends (2025).

Shakespeare also wrote Awkward Beauty: The Art of Lucy Jones (2019) about Lucy Jones, a British artist with cerebral palsy.

== Culture and Media ==
In 1991, Shakespeare helped to set up the Northern Disability Arts Forum in Newcastle, and began compering and working in stand-up comedy, including about his disability and achondroplasia, and also performance art, including performing his theatre lecture No Small Inheritance at The Sage Gateshead in 2006. He served as Chair of Arts Council England, North East and was a member of the Arts Council of England from 2003 to 2008.

Shakespeare's Incarnate series (2008) is held by SHAPE Arts, an important collection of artwork by disabled artists. It is a photographic triptych centring on the theme of human embodiment and inspired by the Gothic Nightmares exhibition at Tate Britain. It includes The Nightmare (After Fuseli), Figure with Meat (After Bacon) and Dead Christ (After Mantegna). The reimagining of Fuseli's The Nightmare alludes to the complex moral dilemmas that modern technology and screening throws up for women in pregnancy, an area of Shakespeare's research.

He regularly contributed to the Ouch! disability blog on the BBC website and was a regular contributor to BBC Radio 4 A Point of View on a variety of topics. He regularly contributes to other radio and TV news and current affairs programmes including BBC Radio 4 Front Row, BBC Question Time, Radio 4 Today, BBC Newsnight, CNN and Al Jazeera. Shakespeare has authored three TV documentaries: Ivy's Genes (about his daughter), Who Stole My Parking Space, and The Unusual Suspects.

While at Pembroke College, Shakespeare captained the University Challenge team, which lost to St Catherine's College, Oxford (episode shown in 1986). He represented King's College in the University Challenge 2021 Christmas specials 2021 which featured distinguished alumni, beating University of Bristol. He described his experiences on BBC Radio 4's Point of View. In 2016, Shakespeare featured on the ITV show 500 Questions, winning £14,000 by answering 42 out of 50 questions. He received a standing ovation for his efforts.

== Recognition ==
From 2005-2008 Shakespeare was a Fellow of the National Endowment of Science, Technology and the Arts. In July 2018, he was elected a Fellow of the British Academy.

Shakespeare was appointed Commander of the Order of the British Empire (CBE) in the 2021 Birthday Honours for services to disability research.

A 2017 oil on canvas portrait Tom Shakespeare: Intellect, with Wheels by Lucy Jones is displayed in the National Portrait Gallery.

Shakespeare is on the Board of Light for the World International and chair of Light for the World – UK.

== Personal life ==
Shakespeare is a Quaker. He delivered the 2020 Swarthmore Lecture, titled "Openings to the Infinite Ocean: A Friendly Offering of Hope".

In 2002, Shakespeare married dancer and disability rights campaigner Caroline Bowditch. By 2010, he had split from his wife and was living in Geneva with his partner, Alana.

Owing to a spinal cord injury in 2008, Shakespeare mainly uses a wheelchair. He has two children, both of whom also have achondroplasia; his daughter Ivy is a social worker, and his son Robert is a civil servant. His first grandchild was born in 2020. He lives in Oval, London.

== Arms ==
Coat of arms of Sir Tom Shakespeare
Crest In front of a portcullis Sable an eagle rising grasping with the dexter claw a spear Or barbed Argent. Escutcheon Or on a bend between in chief a portcullis and in base an anchor Sable a spear of the field.

Baronetage of the United Kingdom
Preceded by William Geoffrey Shakespeare	Baronet (of Lakenham); 1996–present	Incumbent
