= Shakespeare Company =

The Royal Shakespeare Company is a major British theatre company, founded in 1879 as the Shakespeare Memorial Theatre, based in Stratford-upon-Avon, England.

- Australian Shakespeare Company, theatre company in Melbourne, Australia
- The Chesapeake Shakespeare Company, theatre company in Baltimore, Maryland, U.S.
- English Shakespeare Company, former theatre company based in London in the 1980s
- Stamford Shakespeare Company, amateur theatre company in Rutland, England
- Marin Shakespeare Company, theatre company in San Rafael, California, U.S.
- Metaverse Shakespeare Company, virtual theatre company in Second Life virtual world
