= Shakespeare and Company =

Shakespeare and Company, Shakespeare & Company, or Shakespeare & Co. may refer to:

- Shakespeare and Company (1919–1941), an influential English-language bookshop in Paris, France founded by Sylvia Beach
- Shakespeare and Company (bookstore), an English-language bookstore in Paris, founded by George Whitman in 1951
- Shakespeare & Company (Massachusetts), a theatre company in Massachusetts
