= Shakespeare Theatre =

Shakespeare Theatre could refer to:

- American Shakespeare Center, Staunton Virginia
- American Shakespeare Theatre, Stratford, Connecticut
- Royal Shakespeare Theatre, Stratford-upon-Avon
- Shakespeare Theatre Company of Washington, D.C.
- Shakespeare Theatre of New Jersey
- Shakespeare's original Globe Theatre
  - Its modern reconstruction, Shakespeare's Globe Theatre
- Elizabethan theatre in general

== See also ==
- Shakespeare Theatre Association of America
