= Shakespeare garden =

Type of themed garden

An illustration from Walter Crane's 1906 book, Flowers from Shakespeare's Garden: a Posy from the Plays

A Shakespeare garden is a themed garden that cultivates some or all of the 175 plants mentioned in the works of William Shakespeare. In English-speaking countries, particularly the United States, these are often public gardens associated with parks, universities, and Shakespeare festivals. Shakespeare gardens are sites of cultural, educational, and romantic interest and can be locations for outdoor weddings.

Signs near the plants usually provide relevant quotations. A Shakespeare garden usually includes several dozen species, either in herbaceous profusion or in a geometric layout with boxwood dividers. Typical amenities are walkways and benches and a weather-resistant bust of Shakespeare. Shakespeare gardens may accompany reproductions of Elizabethan architecture. Some Shakespeare gardens also grow species typical of the Elizabethan period but not mentioned in Shakespeare's plays or poetry.

== Shakespeare ==
In January or February 1631, Sir Thomas Temple, 1st Baronet, of Stowe, was eager to send his man for cuttings from the grapevines at New Place, Stratford, the home of Shakespeare's retirement. Temple's surviving letter, however, makes no note of a Shakespeare connection: he knew the goodness of the vines from his sister-in-law, whose house was nearby. The revival of interest in the flowers mentioned in Shakespeare's plays arose with the revival of flower gardening in the United Kingdom. An early document is Paul Jerrard, Flowers from Stratford-on-Avon (London 1852), in which Jerrard attempted to identify Shakespeare's floral references, in a purely literary and botanical exercise, such as those by J. Harvey Bloom (Shakespeare's Garden, London: Methuen, 1903) or F. G. Savage (The Flora and Folk Lore of Shakespeare Cheltenham: E. J. Burrow, 1923). This parallel industry continues today.

A small arboretum of some forty trees mentioned by Shakespeare was planted in 1988 to complement the garden of Anne Hathaway's Cottage in Shottery, a mile from Stratford-on-Avon. "Visitors can sit on the specially designed bench, gaze at the cottage, press a button and listen to one of four Shakespearean sonnets read by famous actors," the official website informs the prospective visitor. A live willow cabin made of growing willows, inspired by lines in Twelfth Night, is another feature, and a maze of yew.

== New Place, Stratford-on-Avon ==
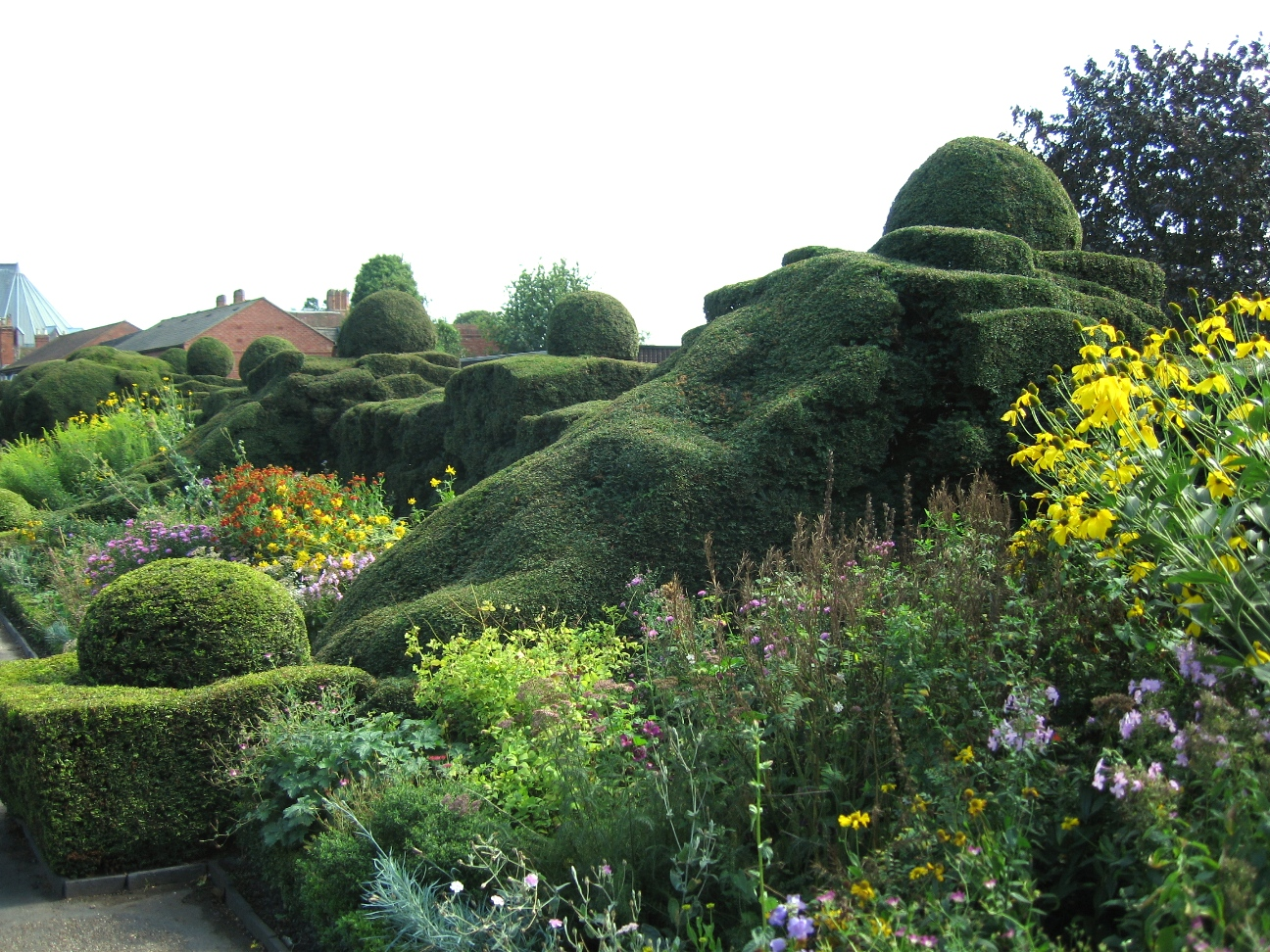
New Place Gardens, Stratford-upon-Avon

The major Shakespeare garden is that imaginatively reconstructed by Ernest Law at New Place, Stratford-on-Avon, in the 1920s. He used a woodcut from Thomas Hill, The Gardiners Labyrinth (London, 1586), noting in his press coverage when the garden was in the planning stage, that it was "a book Shakespeare must certainly have consulted when laying out his own Knott Garden". The same engraving was used in laying out the Queen's Garden behind Kew Palace in 1969. Ernest Law's Shakespeare's Garden, Stratford-upon-Avon (1922), with photographic illustrations showing quartered plats in patterns outlined by green and grey clipped edgings, each centred by roses grown as standards, must have supplied impetus to many flower-filled revivalist Shakespeare's gardens of the 1920s and '30s. For Americans, Esther Singleton produced The Shakespeare Garden (New York, 1931). Singleton's and Law's plantings, as with most Shakespeare gardens, owed a great deal to the bountiful aesthetic of the partly revived but largely invented "English cottage garden" tradition dating from the 1870s. Few attempts were made in revived garden plans to keep strictly to historical plants, until the National Trust led the way in the 1970s with a knot garden at Little Moreton Hall, Cheshire, and the restored parterre at Hampton Court Palace (1977).

== Recent developments ==
The conventions of Shakespeare Gardens were familiar enough in the 1920s that E. F. Benson sets the opening of Mapp and Lucia (1931) in the not-quite-recently widowed Lucia's "Perdita's Garden" at Riseholme, in words that epitomise Benson's dry touch:

Perdita's garden requires a few words of explanation. It was a charming little square plot in front of the timbered façade of the Hurst, surrounded by yew-hedges and intersected with paths of crazy pavement, carefully smothered in stone-crop, which led to the Elizabethan sundial from Wardour Street in the centre. It was gay in spring with those flowers (and no others) on which Perdita doted. There were 'violets dim', and primroses and daffodils, which came before the swallow dared and took the winds (usually of April) with beauty.

But now in June the swallow had dared long ago, and when spring and the daffodils were over, Lucia always allowed Perdita's garden a wider, though still strictly Shakespearian scope. There was eglantine (Penzance briar) in full flower now, and honeysuckle and gillyflowers and plenty of pansies for thoughts, and yards of rue (more than usual this year), and so Perdita's garden was gay all the summer.

Here then, this morning, Lucia seated herself by the sundial, all in black, on a stone bench on which was carved the motto 'Come thou north wind, and blow thou south, that my garden spices may flow forth.' Sitting there with Pepino's poems and The Times she obscured about one-third of this text, and fat little Daisy would obscure the rest..."

== Shakespeare's flora ==
Shakespeare grew up in a small town with gardens, surrounded by meadow, river and woodlands. His references to trees, herbs, kitchen and flower garden plants are correct botanically, and are a source for plants' names and uses in Elizabethan times. English ships exploring the New World brought back new plants to join the local ones being designed for estates or in the kitchen garden outside the tradeswoman's door. The Elizabethans gave symbolic meaning to certain plants, as Ophelia's speech (below) illustrates. Shakespeare uses individual plants, gardens, gardening knowledge and skills (e.g. pruning), forests and other landscapes to describe character and place, set or shift tone and mood, make allusions perhaps that in prose would prove politically dangerous.

The best known reference in Shakespeare of plants used for symbolic purposes, aside from passing mention, as in Romeo and Juliet, "What's in a name? That which we call a rose by any other name would smell as sweet." is Ophelia's speech from Hamlet:

Ophelia: There's rosemary, that's for remembrance. Pray you, love,
remember. And there is pansies, that's for thoughts.

Laertes: A document in madness! Thoughts and remembrance fitted.

Ophelia: There's fennel for you, and columbines. There's rue for you,
and here's some for me. We may call it herb of grace o' Sundays.
O, you must wear your rue with a difference! There's a daisy. I
would give you some violets, but they wither'd all when my father
died. They say he made a good end.

Shakespeare devotes five History plays Henry VI, Part 1, 2, 3; Richard III, Henry VIII to the Wars of the Roses which lasted from 1455 to 1485. This dynastic struggle between two houses (York and Lancaster) was resolved when Henry VII married Elizabeth of York, and founded the Tudor dynasty. Shakespeare uses the historic symbolism of the Red Rose of Lancaster, the White Rose of York, and ends this sequence of plays in Richard III (V,5,19) with the line "We will unite the white rose and the red." That union is the Tudor Rose with its white and red petals.

All the plants Shakespeare names in his plays are mentioned in classical medical texts or medieval herbal manuals.

== Central Park ==
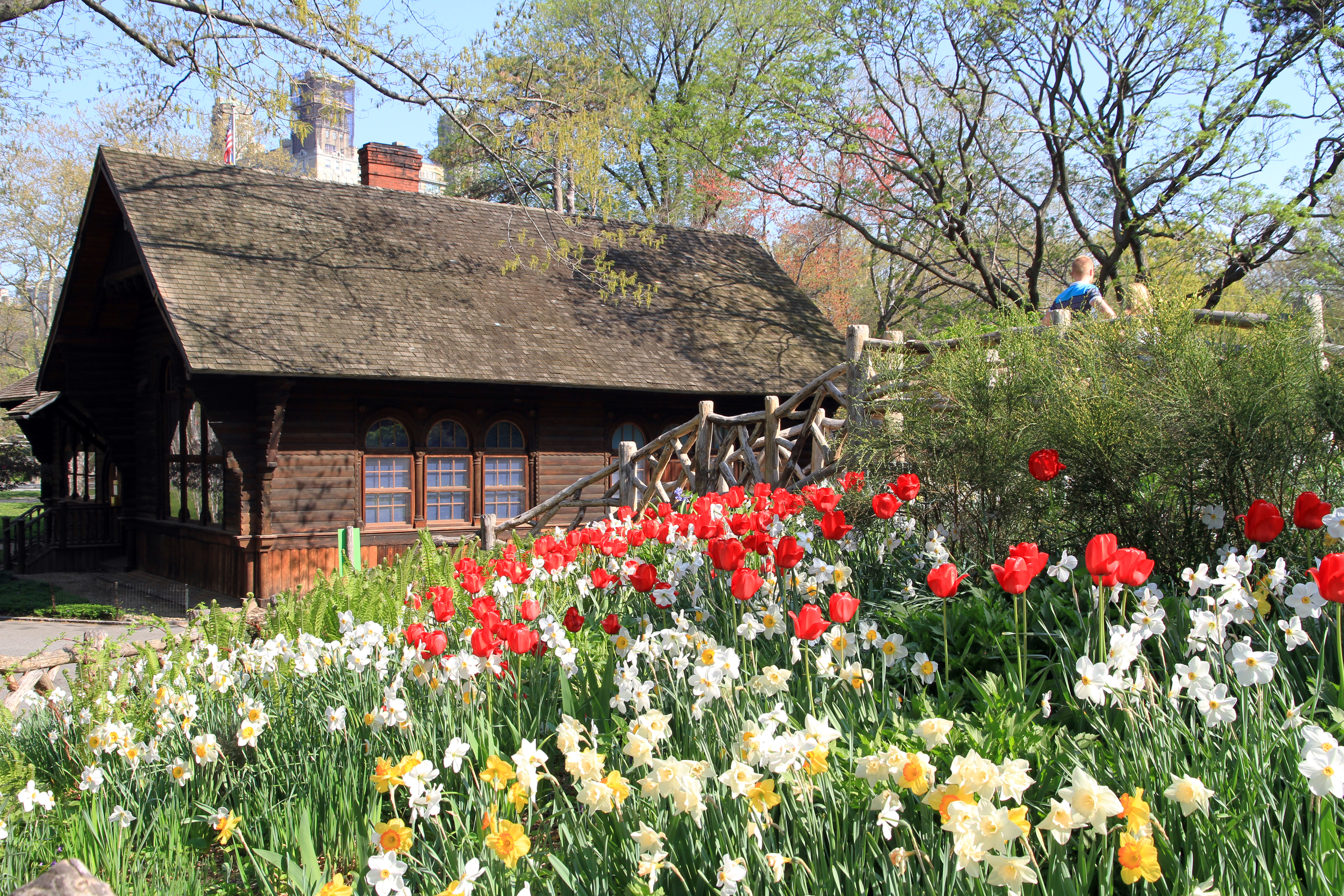
Shakespeare Garden in Central Park

An early Shakespeare garden was added in the anniversary year 1916 to Central Park, New York City. In honour of the Bard and the reading of literature, this area is one of eight designated Quiet Zones.

It included a graft from a mulberry tree said to have been grafted from one planted by Shakespeare in 1602; that tree was cut down by Rev. Francis Gastrell, owner of New Place, however The tree blew down in a summer storm in 2006 and was removed. This garden is located near the Delacorte Theater that houses the New York Shakespeare Festival. According to information available on the Central Park web pages, the Shakespeare Garden there does still contain some of the flowers and plants mentioned in his plays.

== Cleveland ==
The rich weave of associations engendered by Shakespeare Gardens is exemplified in the Shakespeare Garden of Cleveland, Ohio, where herb-bordered paths, converge on a bust of Shakespeare. The requisite mulberry tree was from a cutting sent by the critic Sir Sidney Lee, a slip said to be from the mulberry at New Place. Elms were planted by E. H. Sothen and Julia Marlowe, oaks by William Butler Yeats, and a circular bed of roses sent by the mayor of Verona, from the traditional tomb of Juliet, planted by Phyllis Neilson Terry, niece of Ellen Terry. Birnam Wood was represented by sycamore maples from Scotland. The sundial was Byzantine, presented by the Shakespearean actor, Robert Mantell. Jars planted with ivy and flowers were sent by Sir Herbert Beerbohm Tree, Rabindranath Tagore— as the "Shakespeare of India"— and Sarah Bernhardt.

The Shakespeare Garden inaugural exercises took place on April 14th, 1916, the tercentenary year... E. H. Sothen and Julia Marlowe were guests of honor. After speeches of welcome by city officials and Mayor Harry L. Davis, the orchestra played selections from Mendelssohn's "Midsummer Night's Dream," and the Normal School Glee Club sang choral setting of "Hark, Hark, the Lark" and "Who Is Sylvia?" A group of high school pupils in Elizabethan costume escorted the guests to the garden entrance and stood guard during the planting of the dedicatory elms.... Miss Marlowe climaxed the proceedings by her readings of Perdita's flower scene from A Winter's Tale, the 54th Sonnet of Shakespeare, and verses from the Star Spangled Banner. Her leading of all present in the singing of the National Anthem brought the impressive event to a close."

In later years the Cleveland Shakespeare Garden continued to be enriched at every Shakespearean occasion. Willows flanking the fountain were planted by William Faversham and Daniel Frohman. Vachel Lindsay planted a poplar and recited his own Shakespeare tribute. Novelist Hugh Walpole also planted a tree. Aline Kilmer, widow of the soldier poet, Joyce Kilmer, made a visit in 1919, and the actor, Otis Skinner and the humorist, Stephen Leacock. David Belasco came to plant two junipers.

== Colorado ==
The Colorado Shakespeare Garden is a Public Garden founded in 1991 by herbalist Marlene Cowdrey. Eight gardens line a courtyard on the University of Colorado campus in Boulder, Colorado. The gardens are placed near to the WPA built Mary Rippon Theatre, which is the major performance space for the Colorado Shakespeare Festival. The gardens are: Founder's, Kitchen, War of the Roses, Midsummer Night's Dream, Knot, Canon, Elizabethan, and a Highlight garden featuring each performance season's plants. Members of the Colorado Shakespeare Gardens are volunteers interested in gardens or Shakespeare or both. They research, design, plant, and maintain the gardens with oversight from CU. The various gardens are designed to display Elizabethan gardening techniques as well as feature plants. There is an audio-visual tour.

== List of Shakespeare gardens ==
Location	Site	Reference
Bethel Public Library, Bethel, Connecticut	Public park or botanical garden	
Brookfield Shakespeare's Garden, Brookfield, Connecticut	Public park or botanical garden	
Brooklyn Botanical Gardens, Brooklyn, New York	Public park or botanical garden	
Misericordia University	University or college campus	
Evanston, Illinois	Public park or botanical garden	
Cleveland, Ohio	Public park or botanical garden Daphne High School Daphne, Alabama Created by Agricultural Dept., 2021	
Johannesburg Botanical Garden, South Africa	Public park or botanical garden	
Central Park, New York City	Public park, Shakespeare festival	
International Rose Test Garden, Portland, Oregon	Public park or botanical garden	
Golden Gate Park, San Francisco, California	Public park or botanical garden	
The Huntington, San Marino, California	Public park or botanical garden	
Vienna, Austria	Public park or botanical garden	
Herzogspark, Regensburg, Germany	Public park or botanical garden	
Hilltop Garden and Nature Center at Indiana University, Bloomington, IN	University or college campus	
Moraine Valley Community College, Palos Hills, IL		
Illinois State University	University or college campus	
Kilgore College	University or college campus	
Naugatuck Valley Community College, Waterbury	University or college campus	
Northwestern University	University or college campus	
St. Norbert College	University or college campus	
Mount Saint Mary Academy, Watchung, NJ	High School Campus	
Susquehanna University	University or college campus	
University College of the Fraser Valley	University or college campus	
University of Massachusetts	University or college campus	
The University of the South	University or college campus	
University of South Dakota	University campus	
Vassar College	University or college campus	
Blount Cultural Park of the Alabama Shakespeare Festival	Shakespeare festival	
Colorado Shakespeare Festival	Shakespeare festival	
Illinois Shakespeare Festival	Shakespeare festival	
Elizabethan Garden, Folger Shakespeare Library	Public park or botanical garden	
The Elizabethan Herb Garden, Mellon Park, Pittsburgh, PA	Public park or botanical garden	
The University of Tennessee at Chattanooga	University campus	
Shakespeare Garden in Cedar Brook Park, Plainfield, NJ	Public park or botanical garden. Operated by the Union County Park system, it was established in 1927. The Garden appears on the National Register of Historic Places.	
Dunedin Botanic Garden, New Zealand	Public park or botanical garden.	
Shakespeare Garden in Stanley Park, Vancouver, BC, Canada	Public park or botanical garden	
Shakespearian Garden in Wagga Wagga Botanic Gardens, Wagga Wagga, New South Wales, Australia.	Public park or botanical garden	

== See also ==
- American Acclimatization Society
- List of garden types
- Garden design
- Man'yō botanical garden
