= Shakespeare Songs =

Shakespeare Songs may refer to

- Music in the plays of William Shakespeare
- Shakespeare Songs, songs by Madeleine Dring (1923-1977)
- Shakespeare-Songs, cycle of German Lieder by Wolfgang Fortner (1907-1987)
- Three Shakespeare Songs, Op. 6 (1905); Five Shakespeare Songs, Op. 23 (1921); and Four Shakespeare Songs, Op. 30 (1933) by Roger Quilter
- Shakespeare Songs, songs by Virgil Thomson (1896-1989)
- Shakespeare Songs (Alfred Deller album), 1967
