= Shakespeare Garden (Evanston, Illinois) =

- U.S. National Register of Historic Places
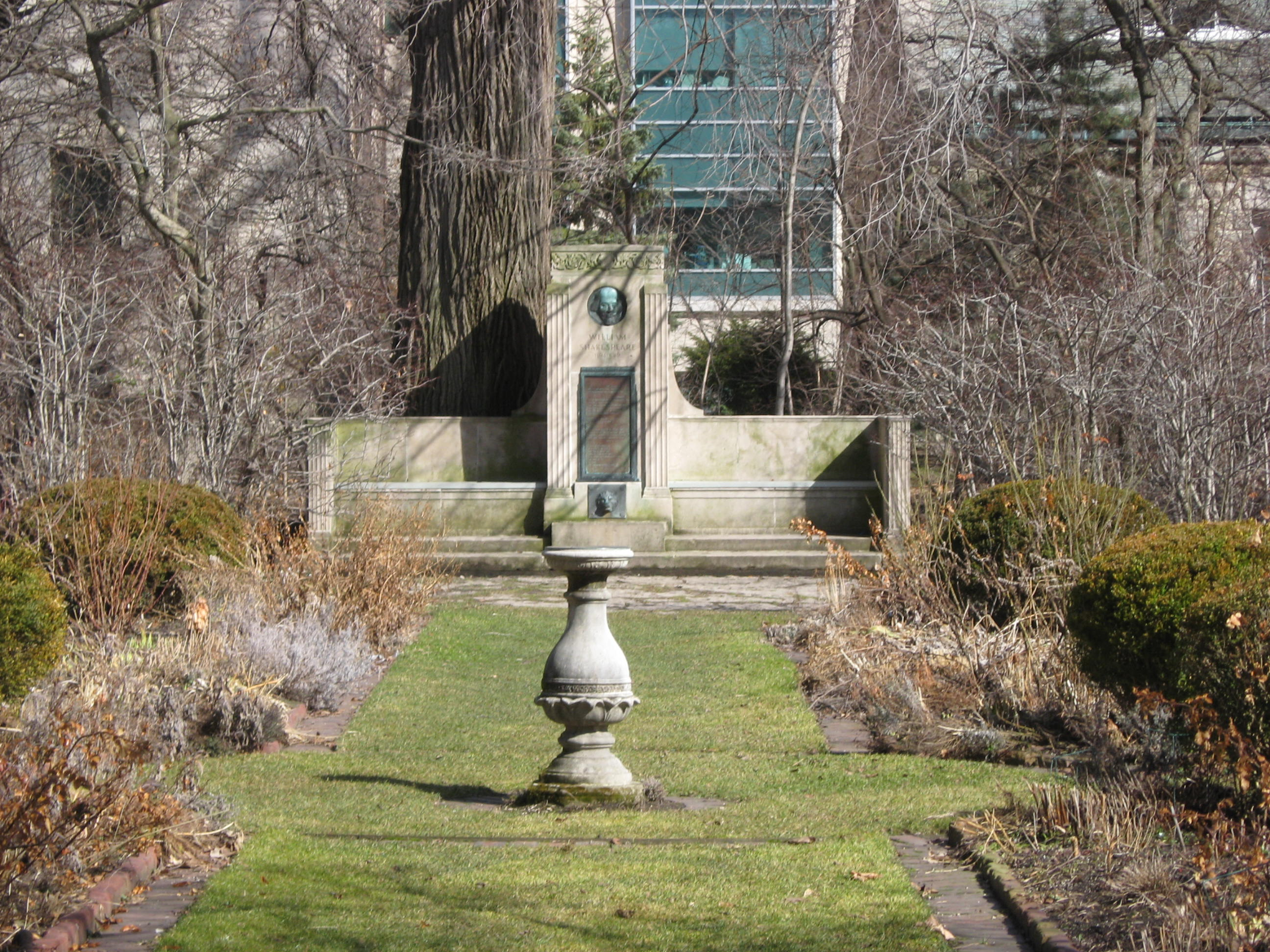
- Shakespeare Garden

- Location within Illinois Location within the United States
- Location: Northwestern University campus, Evanston, Illinois
- Coordinates: 42°3′24″N 87°40′34″W
- Area: less than one acre
- Architect: Jensen, Jens; Burnham Bros.
- NRHP reference No.: 88002234
- Added to NRHP: November 16, 1988

The Shakespeare Garden in Evanston, Illinois, United States, is a Shakespeare garden on the campus of Northwestern University. Planned in 1915 and built from 1916 to 1929, the garden was the first Shakespeare Garden in the United States. The garden was designed by landscape architect Jens Jensen and was constructed by the Garden Club of Evanston, which still maintains the area. In 1988, the garden was listed on the U.S. National Register of Historic Places.

== Design ==
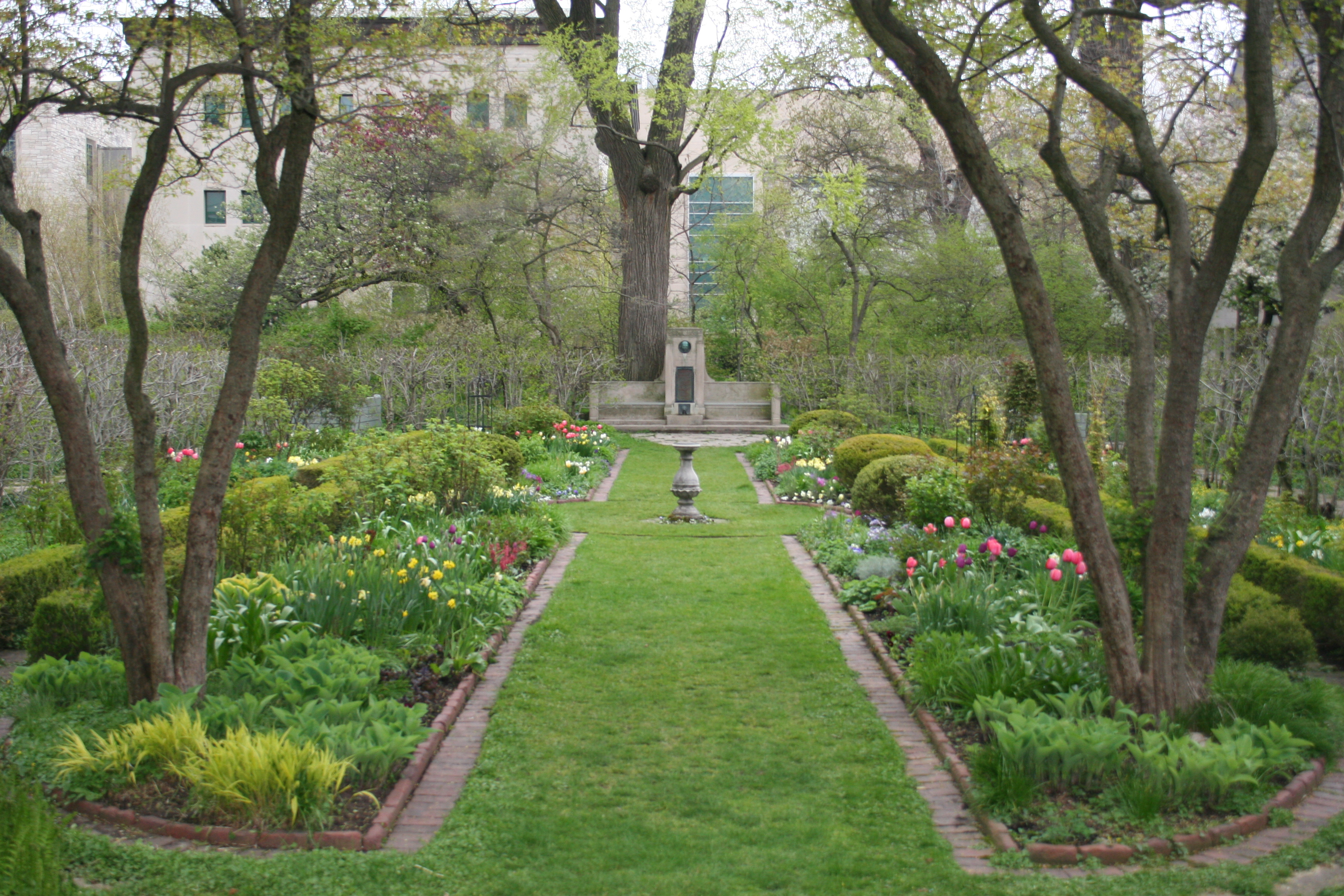
Another view of Shakespeare Garden, Evanston, Illinois, built 1916-1929.

The Shakespeare Garden is located on the Northwestern University campus at the corner of Sheridan Road and Garrett Place, near the Howes Chapel and Garrett–Evangelical Theological Seminary. The garden is 70 feet (21 m) wide by 120 feet (37 m) long and is divided into eight flower beds. The four outer beds are designed informally, while the four inner beds are knot gardens; the outer and inner beds are separated by boxwood plants. The borders of the garden are lined with hawthorn trees, many of which were imported from France when the garden was first planted. The more than fifty varieties of plants in the garden were either mentioned in Shakespeare's works, common in the Tudor period in England, or are cultivars of plants in the other two categories. The garden also includes a fountain with a plaque honoring Shakespeare and a stone memorial designed by Hubert Burnham, the son of architect Daniel Burnham.

== History ==
In 1915, the Drama League of America recommended the construction of Shakespeare gardens to commemorate the 300th anniversary of the playwright's death. Noted Chicago landscape architect and Drama League member Jens Jensen designed such a garden, and fellow member Alice Houston suggested that the Garden Club of Evanston adopt the design. Northwestern University agreed to host the garden on its campus in late 1915, and construction and planting began the following spring. To raise funds for the garden, the Garden Club hosted its first garden fair in May 1916; the fair became an annual event and is still held to this day. Planting in the garden was finished in 1920, and in the following decade the Garden Club added the garden's other features. The completed garden was the first Shakespeare garden in the United States. In 1930, the garden was officially given to Northwestern; however, it is still maintained by the Garden Club. The garden was added to the National Register of Historic Places on November 16, 1988. A sundial and brick edging on the inner flower beds were added to the garden in 1990. The garden celebrated its centennial birthday in 2015.
