= Ishikawa Takeyoshi Memorial Library =

Library in Tokyo, Japan

- 石川武美記念図書館
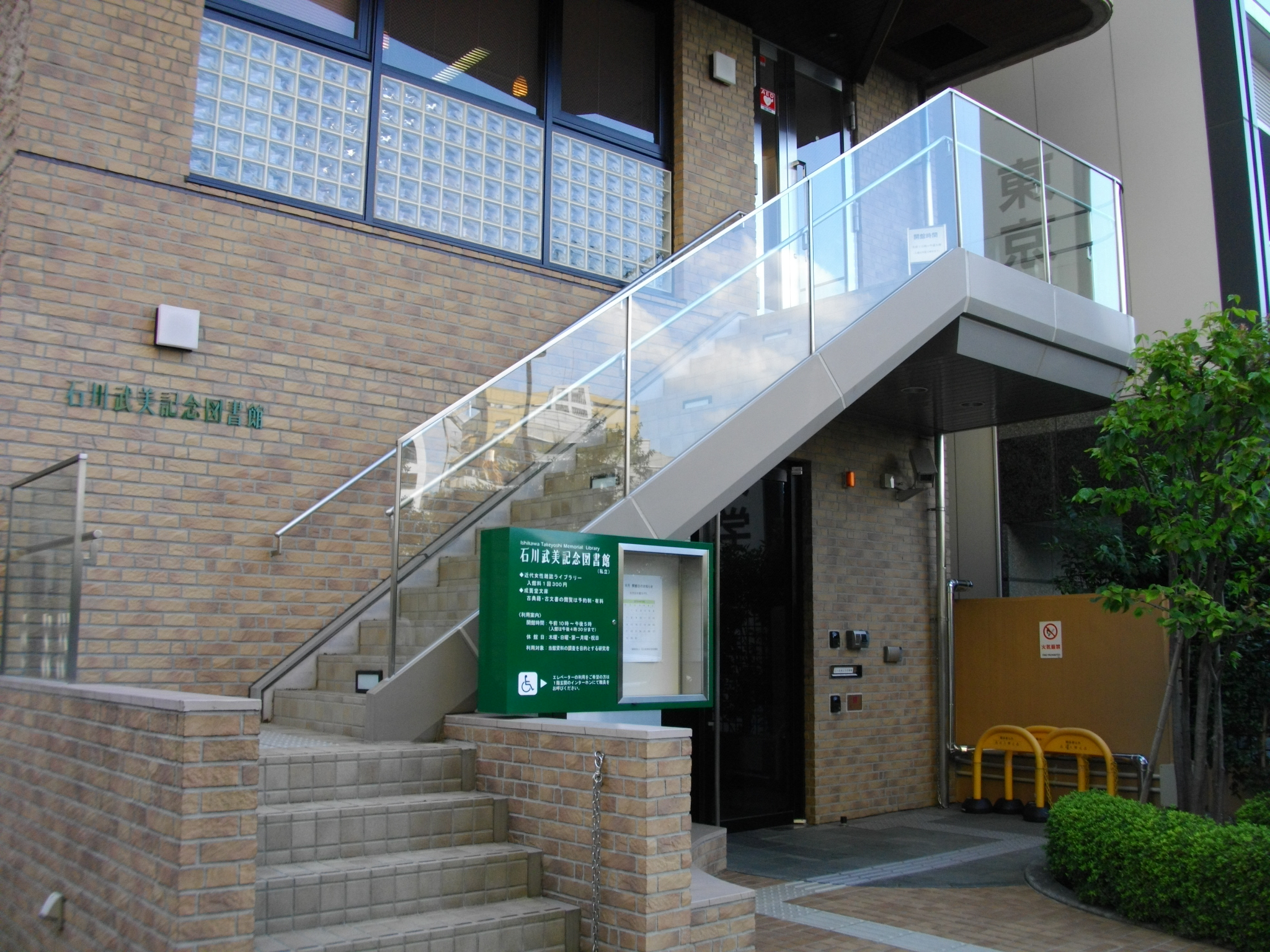
- 35°42′03″N 139°45′33″E
- Location: 2-9 Kanda-Surugadai, Chiyoda, Tokyo, Japan
- Type: Private library
- Scope: Women's periodicals Classical Japanese literature
- Established: 1947 (78 years ago) (Ochanomizu Library opening)

Access and use
- Population served: Researchers

Other information
- Website: www.ochato.or.jp

The Ishikawa Takeyoshi Memorial Library (石川武美記念図書館, Ishikawa Takeyoshi Kinen Toshokan) is a private library in Chiyoda, Tokyo, Japan. The library first opened in December 1947 as the Ochanomizu Library (お茶の水図書館), for the exclusive use of women; men have been admitted since its reorganization in October 2003. The library is named after Ishikawa Takeyoshi (1887–1961), founder of Japanese publishing house Shufunotomo, who, in 1941, established the predecessor of today's Ishikawa Takeyoshi Memorial Library General Foundation (一般財団法人石川武美記念図書館), the change in name and legal form occurring in 2013.

Since the 2003 reorganization, the library has had two sections, the Library of Modern Women's Periodicals (近代女性雑誌ライブラリー) and the Seikidō Bunko (成簣堂文庫), which specializes in classical Japanese literature and includes the Chikuhakuen (竹柏園本) and Mutō (武藤本) Collections.

== Seikidō Bunko ==
The Seikidō Bunko comprises the collection Ishikawa Takeyoshi purchased from his friend Tokutomi Sohō and totals some one hundred thousand volumes—classical texts and historic documents dating from the Nara period to the end of the Edo period and the Meiji Restoration, as well as Chinese and Korean works, and some Western materials.

The Chikuhakuen Collection represents part of the book collection of Sasaki Nobutsuna, as acquired by Ishikawa Takeyoshi in 1944, and comprises some two thousand volumes related to the Man'yōshū, including the twenty volumes of the late-Kamakura period Nishi Honganji-bon, the earliest complete manuscript of the anthology.

The Mutō Collection represents part of the book collection of scholar of Japanese literature Mutō Motonobu (武藤元信) (1854–1918), a specialist in The Pillow Book, and comprises some two thousand volumes donated to the Foundation in 1944.
