= Shakespeare by the Sea =

Shakespeare by the Sea may refer to:

- Shakespeare by the Sea, Halifax
- Shakespeare by the Sea, Newfoundland
- Shakespeare by the Sea (Australia)
- Shakespeare by the Sea, Los Angeles
