= Michinoku Mano-Manyo Botanical Garden =

Garden in Minamisōma, Fukushima, Japan

The Michinoku Mano Manyo Botanical Garden (みちのく真野万葉植物園, Michinoku Mano Man'yō Shokubutsuen) was a botanical garden located in Kashima, Fukushima, Japan. It was open daily without charge. The garden had contained about 150 plant varieties that appeared in the Man'yōshū anthology.

== See also ==
- List of botanical gardens in Japan
