= William Harold Nelson Shakespeare =

William Shakespeare
Personal information
- Full name: William Harold Nelson Shakespeare
- Born: 24 August 1893; Worcester, England
- Died: 10 July 1976 (aged 82); Whittington, Worcestershire, England
- Batting: Right-handed

Career statistics
Competition	FC
Matches	26
Runs scored	789
Batting average	19.72
100s/50s	0/4
Top score	67*
Balls bowled	5
Wickets	0
Bowling average	-
5 wickets in innings	0
10 wickets in match	0
Best bowling	-
Catches/stumpings	11/0
- Source: CricketArchive, 19 May 2009

Wing Commander William Harold Nelson Shakespeare OBE MC AFC (24 August 1893 – 10 July 1976) was an English aviator who flew for the Royal Flying Corps and the Royal Air Force in World War I. He was awarded both the Air Force Cross and the Military Cross during his time in the military. Shakespeare later worked as a civilian pilot for Handley Page, captaining the first passenger flight from London to Athens, and eventually became president of the Royal Air Forces Association (RAFA). He also served as president of Worcestershire County Cricket Club, for whom he had earlier played first-class cricket.

== Early years ==
William Shakespeare was the eldest son of William and Barbara Shakespeare of Chadsworth, Barbourne, Worcester. He was educated at Worcester Royal Grammar School and joined the 1/8th Worcestershire Regiment (Territorial Force) at the commencement of World War I. He served with this unit at the front for over twelve months. He was given a commission and attached to the 6th Worcestershire Regiment, and afterwards transferred to the Royal Flying Corps .

== As a pilot ==
As a pilot, in July 1918 Shakespeare won the Military Cross. His medal was awarded after he successfully carried out two patrols, one in "very bad weather" and one under intense fire. The citation praised him as "a gallant and determined pilot". A few months later, he gained the Air Force Cross.

"T./Capt. William Harold Nelson Shakespeare, R.F.C. was awarded the Military Cross for conspicuous gallantry and devotion to duty. He carried out a most successful contact patrol in very bad weather at a height of 400 feet and brought back very valuable information. Later, he carried out another successful contact patrol at a low altitude, his machine being subjected to intense rifle and machine-gun fire. He is a gallant and determined pilot and has set a fine example to his squadron." Supplement to the London Gazette. 5. July 1918.

He transferred across to the Royal Air Force when the organisation came into being on 1 Apr 1918, and was one of Marshal of the Royal Air Force Hugh Montague Trenchard's first Wing Commanders. After the First World War, he became one of the pioneers of military and civil transport aviation. While still serving in the RAF, his services were employed by Handley Page to promote their new commercial passenger service in the Handley Page 0.400 series, which after the end of the First World War, had been converted from a bomber to a passenger aircraft. He was the captain of the first pan European flight from London to Athens, a flight which took place to promote Handley Page and prove the capability of the Aircraft.

== As a cricketer ==
Shakespeare played 26 first-class matches for Worcestershire between 1919 and 1931. He made his first-class debut in August 1919 against Warwickshire; this was a friendly match as Worcestershire did not enter the County Championship that season. Opening the batting with Alfred Cliff, he had a fine match, scoring 62 in the first innings and 67 not out (which was to remain his career best) in the second. He played one further match that year and three in 1920 but could not replicate his initial form, with a top score of only 11 in six innings.

In 1924, Shakespeare finally returned to first-class cricket, scoring 62* against Glamorgan, and this time – although he never made any really big scores – he contributed useful thirties and forties fairly often. From 1926 onwards, however, his powers left him and he passed 20 only once in his last 14 innings. His first-class career really ended in 1928, but he did make one final appearance three years later.

Although he never played at such a high level again, Shakespeare did appear for Worcestershire's second XI in the Minor Counties Championship as late as July 1949, when he was nearly 56. He also umpired one first-class game, that between Worcestershire and Combined Services at New Road in May 1950.

== Other activities ==
In later life, Shakespeare became president of RAFA as well as President of Worcestershire County Cricket Club. He was instrumental in the organising of the Victory test matches versus Australia.. His Great Grandson, Squadron Leader Keith William Brooke, followed in his footsteps and graduated RAF Officer training at Royal Air Force Cranwell on 5 November 2009. Throughout the graduation ceremony, Brooke carried Shakespeare original Royal Flying Corps ceremonial sword, which was presented to him in 1914.
