= Shakespeare baronets =

Baronetcy in the Baronetage of the United Kingdom

- Coat of Arms of the Shakespeare baronets of Lakenham
- Creation date: 1942
- Status: extant
- Arms: Or, on a bend between in chief a portcullis and in base an anchor sable, a spear of the field.
- Crest: In front of a portcullis sable an eagle rising, grasping with the dexter claw a spear or, barbed argent.

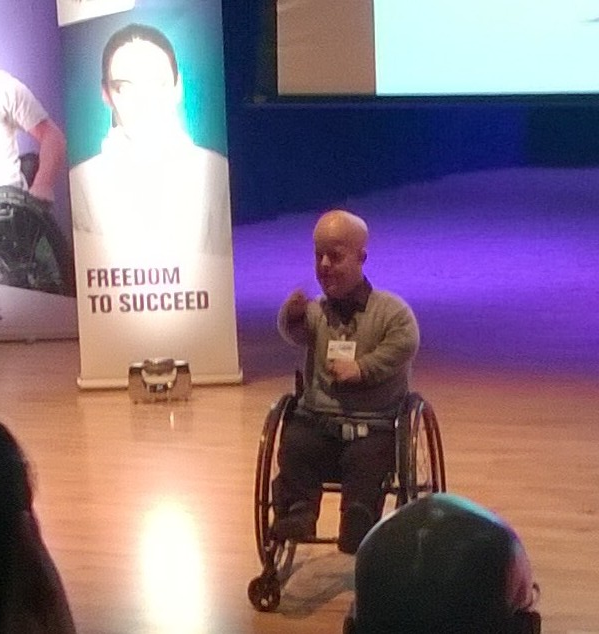
The current baronet, Tom Shakespeare, giving a speech at De Montfort University in 2017

The Shakespeare baronetcy, of Lakenham in the City of Norwich, is a title in the Baronetage of the United Kingdom. It was created in 1942 for the Liberal politician Geoffrey Shakespeare. The 3rd and current Baronet is a geneticist and sociologist.

The Shakespeare baronets descend from Richard Shakespeare, the grandfather of the playwright William Shakespeare.

== Shakespeare baronets of Lakenham (1942) ==
- Sir Geoffrey Hithersay Shakespeare, 1st Baronet (1893–1980)
- Sir William Geoffrey Shakespeare, 2nd Baronet (1927–1996) was a general practitioner who practised at the Bedgrove Health Centre in Aylesbury. He had achondroplasia. He inherited the baronetcy in 1980 on the death of his father. The title passed to the eldest of his children, Tom Shakespeare, on his death in 1996.
- Sir Thomas William "Tom" Shakespeare, 3rd Baronet (born 1966)

The heir presumptive is the present holder's brother James Douglas Geoffrey Shakespeare (born 1971).

== See also ==
- Shakespeare coat of arms
