= Manyo Botanical Garden, Nara =

Botanical garden in Nara, Japan

Coordinates: 34.6823°N 135.8445°E

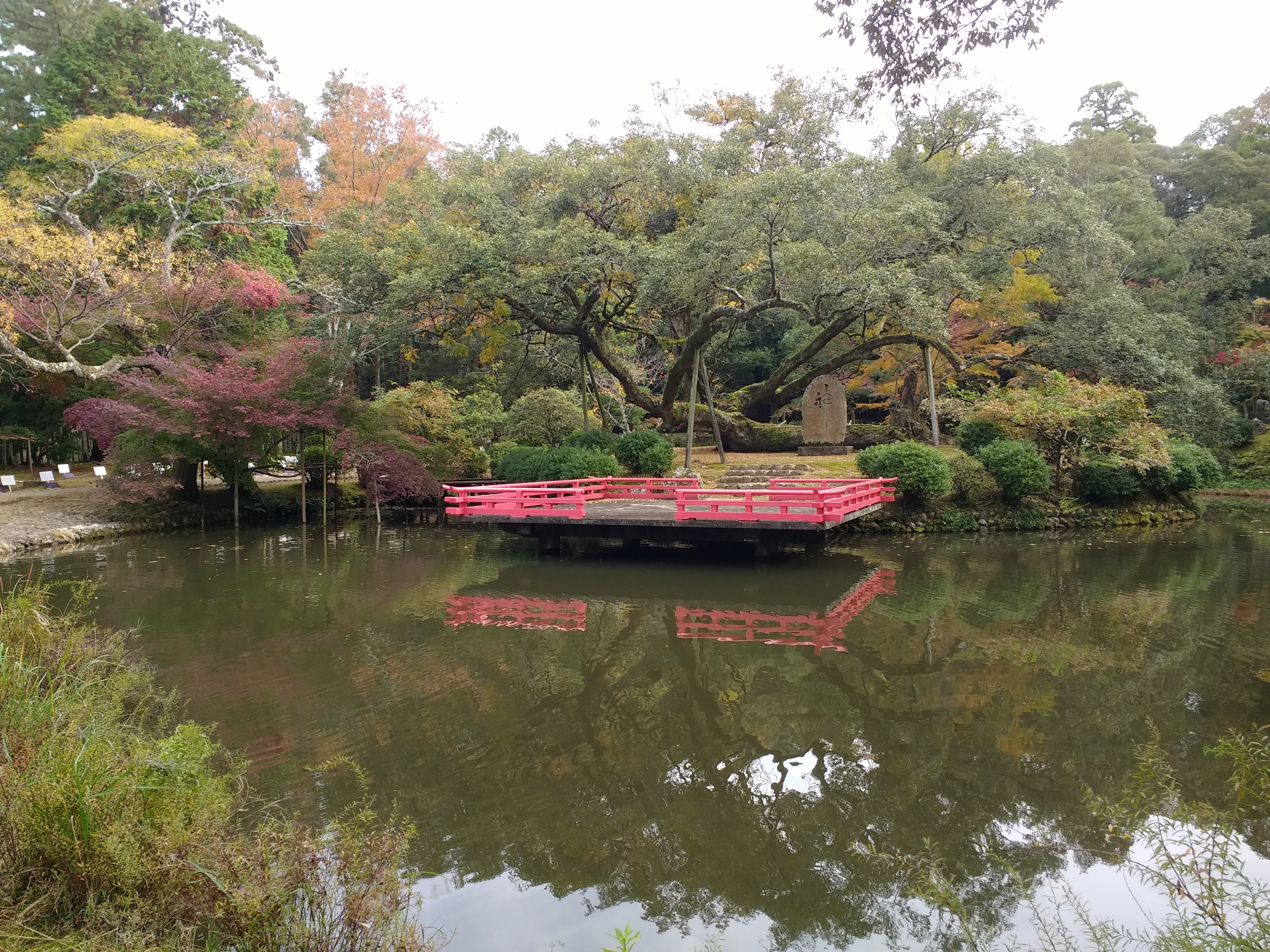
Manyo Botanical Garden

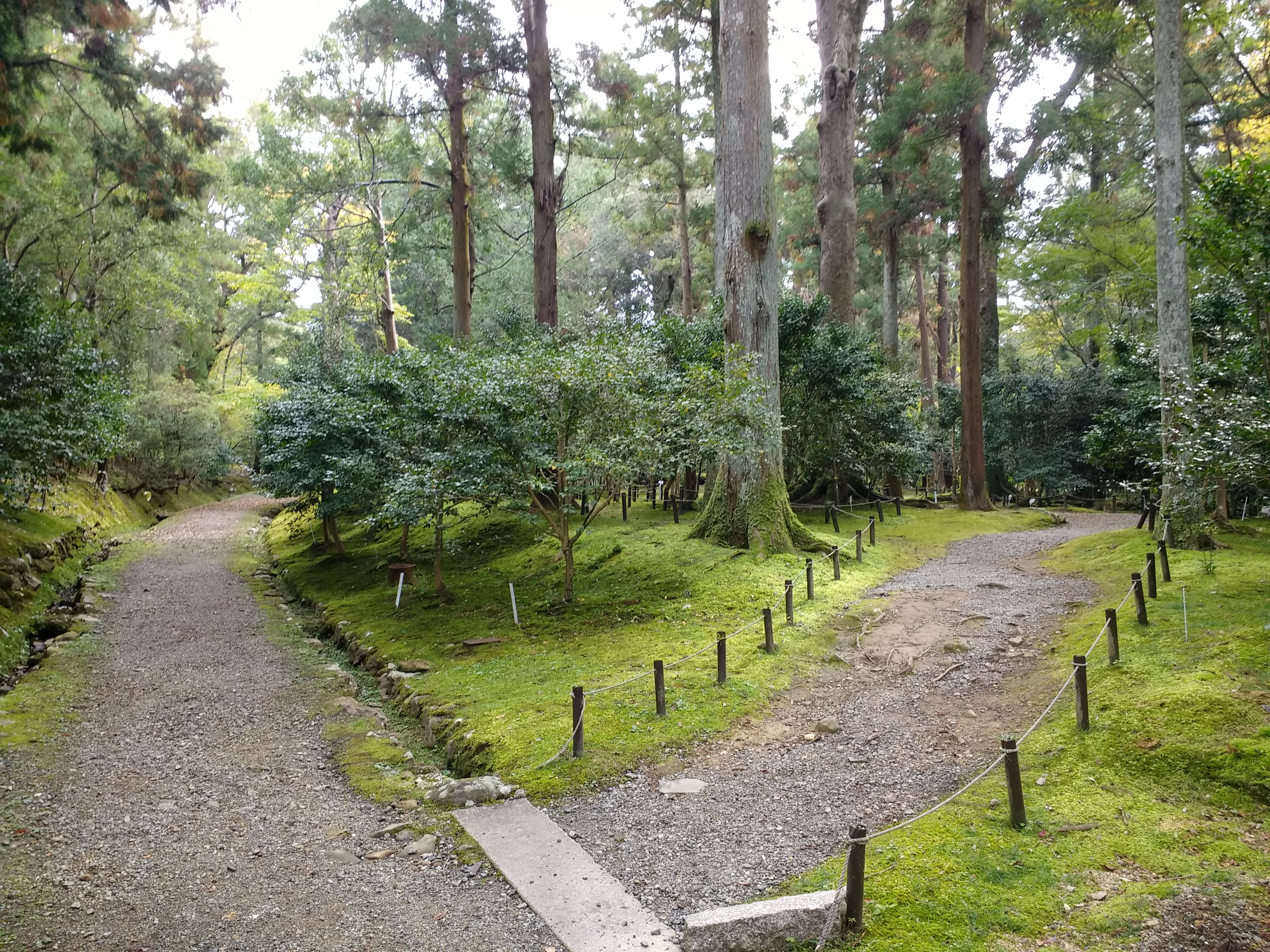
Manyo Botanical Garden

The Manyo Botanical Garden (萬葉植物園, Man'yō Shokubutsuen), also known as the Kasuga Taisha Garden, is a botanical garden located next to the Kasuga Shrine at 160 Kasugano-cho, Nara, Nara, Japan.

The garden opened in 1932, and is a Manyo Botanical Garden containing all plants (over 300 species) mentioned in the Man'yōshū, each labeled with its name and poems that mention it. The site also contains a Wisteria Garden, Camellia Garden, Iris Garden, and a Five Grain Garden which collects grain plants used for food, textiles, or dyes in Man'yōshū times.

== Manyo Gagaku Performance Festival ==
The Manyo Gagaku Performance Festival is celebrated around "Culture Day" at the Manyo Botanical Garden. The event aims to increase appreciation for gagaku. It takes place on the garden's floating stage.

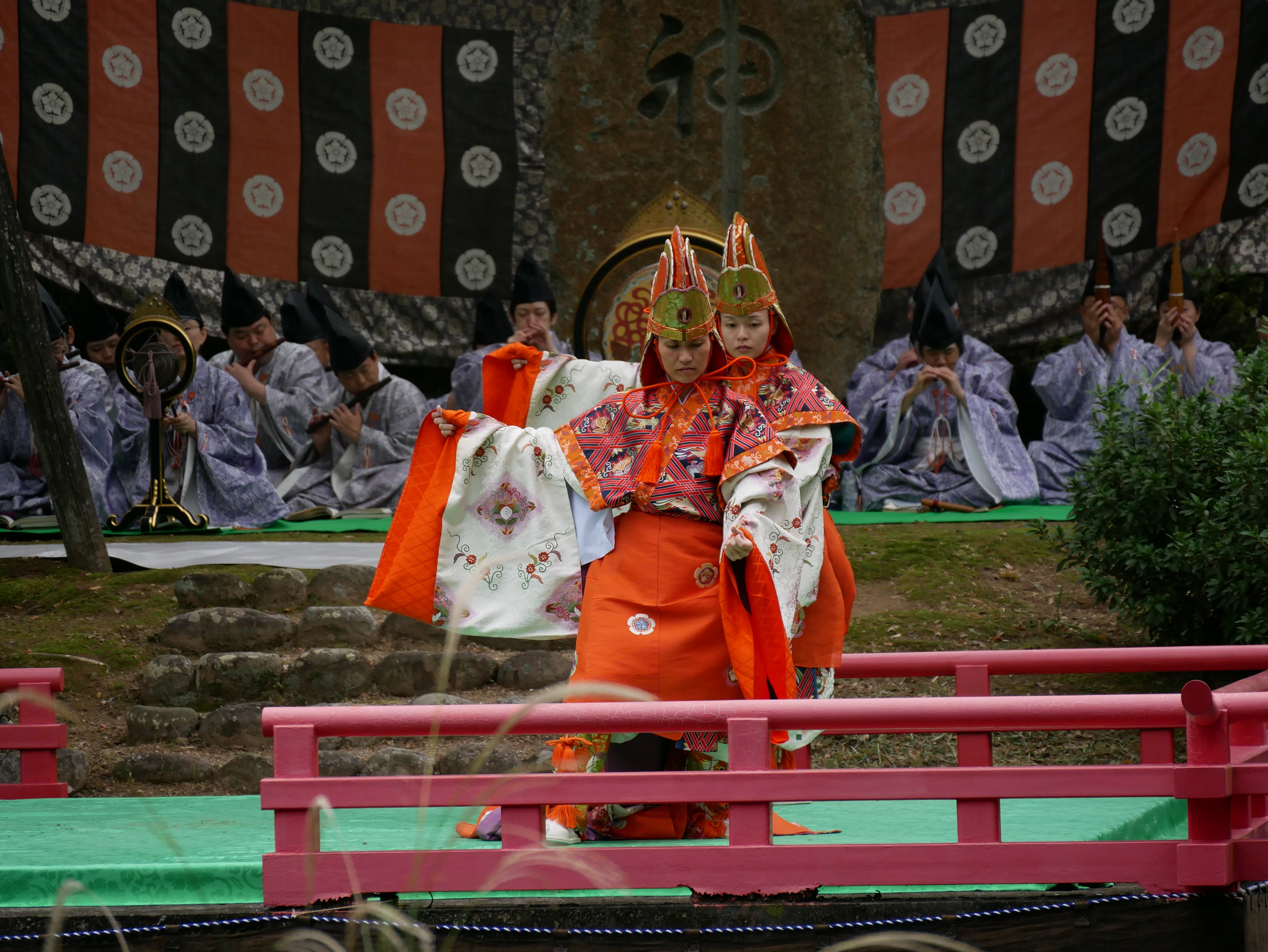
Manyo Gagaku Performance Festival

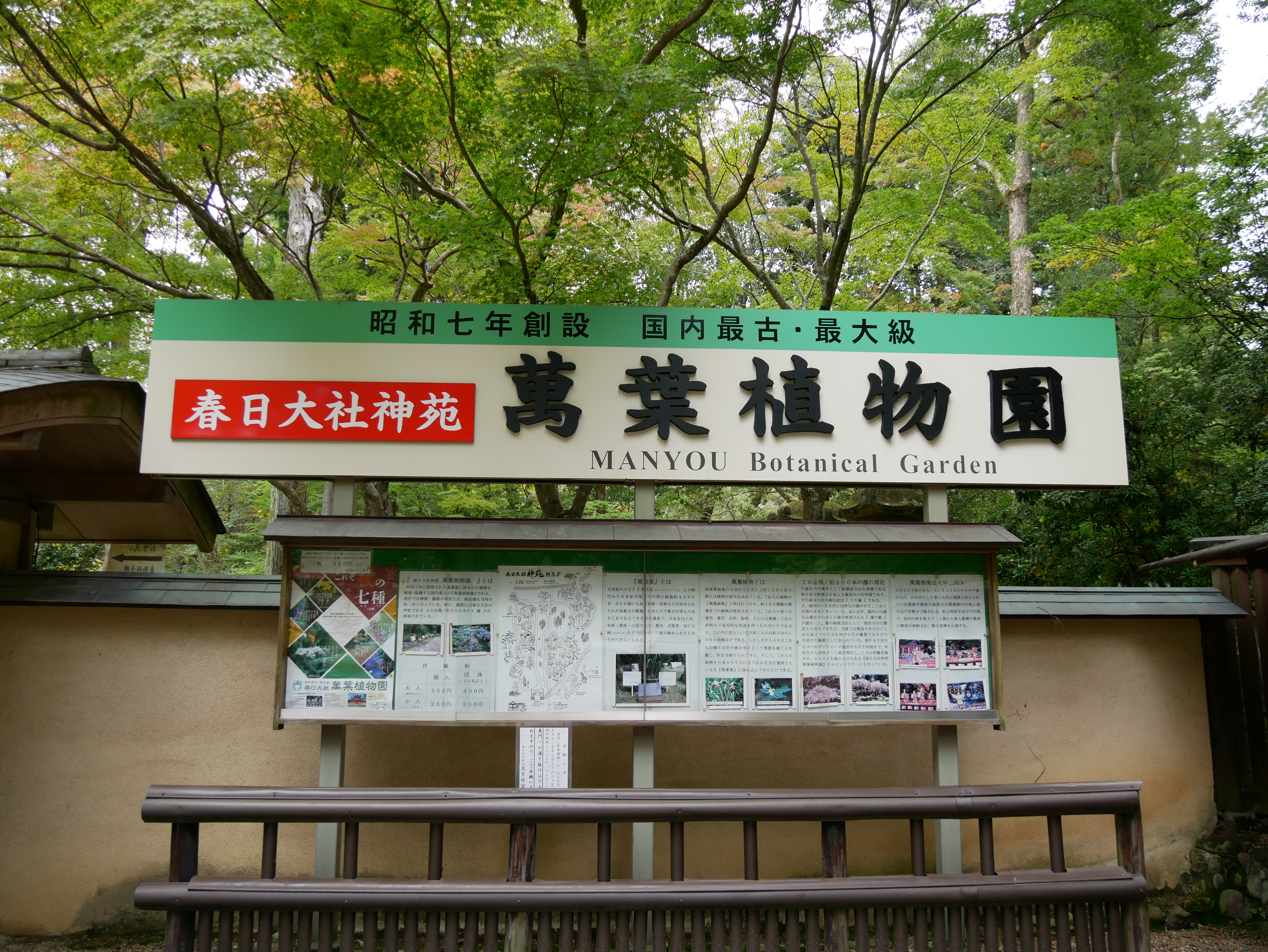
Sign at the entrance of Manyo Botanical Garden

== See also ==
- List of botanical gardens in Japan
