= Futagami Manyo Botanical Gardens =

Botanical gardens in Takaoka, Toyama, Japan

Coordinates: 36°47′28.5″N 137°1′14.5″E

The Futagami Manyo Botanical Gardens (二上山万葉植物園, Futagamiyama Man'yō Shokubutsuen) are botanical gardens located in Takaoka, Toyama, Japan.

The garden site occupies about 10,000 m^{2}, and contains both wildflowers and many plant varieties mentioned in the Man'yōshū anthology.
