= Thomas Fisher (antiquary) =

English antiquary

Thomas Fisher (1772–1836) was an English antiquary.

== Life ==
Fisher was born in Rochester, Kent in or about 1781, the younger of the two sons of Thomas Fisher, printer, bookseller, and alderman of Rochester.

In 1786 Fisher entered the India House as an extra clerk; in April 1816 he was appointed searcher of records. He retired on a pension in June 1834, after having spent in different offices under the company altogether forty-six years. He died unmarried on 20 July 1836, in his sixty-fifth year, at his lodgings in Church Street, Stoke Newington, and was buried on the 26th in Bunhill Fields. From the time of his coming to London he had resided at Gloucester Terrace, Hoxton, in the parish of Shoreditch.

Before he left Rochester Fisher's work as a draughtsman attracted the attention of Isaac Taylor the engraver. He was also eminent as an antiquary. Fisher was in 1821 elected F.S.A. of Perth, and on 5 May 1836 F.S.A. of London, an honour from which he had been hitherto debarred, as a dissenter.

His collections of topographical drawings and prints, portraits and miscellaneous prints, books, and manuscripts, were sold by Evans on 30 May 1837 and two following days.

== Works ==
Some plates in the Custumale Roffense, published by John Thorpe in 1788, are from drawings by Fisher; while the same work states that he had helped Samuel Denne, one of the promoters of the undertaking, in examining the architecture and monuments of Rochester Cathedral.

His first literary effort, a description of the Crown Inn at Rochester and its cellars, was printed with a view and plan in the Gentleman's Magazine for 1789, under the pseudonym of 'Antiquitatis Conservator'. He had previously contributed drawings for one or two plates. In 1795 Denne communicated to the Society of Antiquaries a letter on the subject of watermarks in paper, enclosing drawings by Fisher of sixty-four specimens, together with copies of several autographs and documents discovered by him in a room over the town hall at Rochester. By Fisher's care the records were afterwards placed in proper custody. His next publications were "An Engraving of a fragment of Jasper found near Hillah, bearing part of an inscription in the cuneiform character" (1802), and "An Inscription [in cuneiform characters] of the size of the original, copied from a stone lately found among the ruins of ancient Babylon" (1803), In 1806 and 1807 Fisher helped preserve two specimens of Roman mosaic discovered in the city of London, one in front of East India House in Leadenhall Street, and the other, which was presented to the British Museum, in digging foundations for the enlargement of the Bank of England. These he had engraved from drawings made by himself, and he published a description of them in the Gentleman's Magazine.

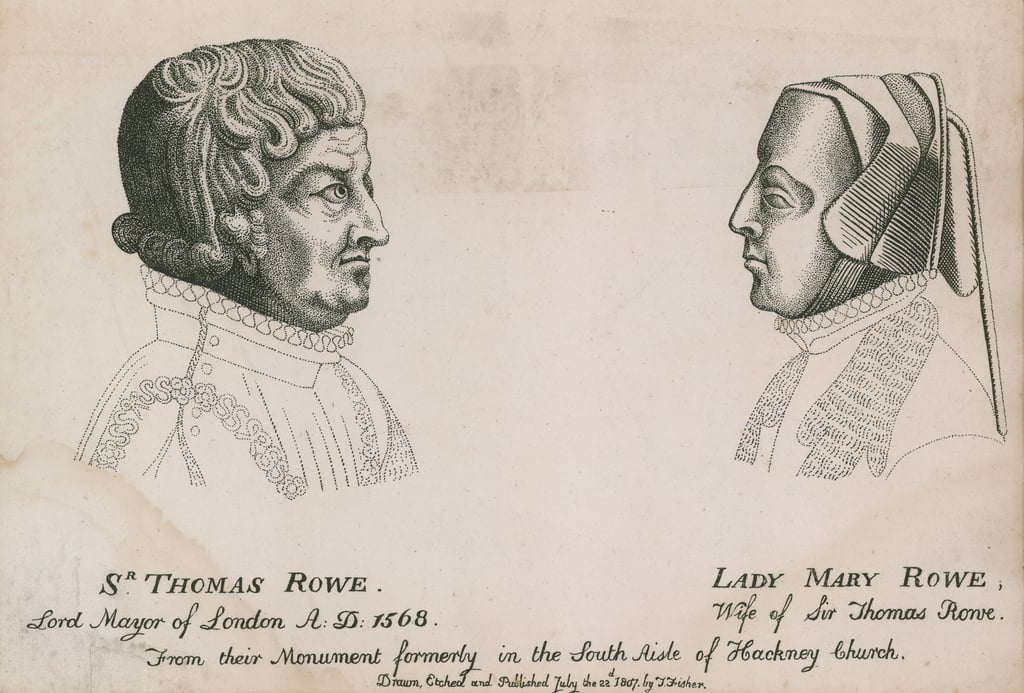
Sir Thomas Rowe, Lord Mayor of London 1568, and Lady Mary Rowe. One of the monuments recorded by Fisher at St Augustine's Tower Hackney in 1807

In the summer of 1804 Fisher discovered some legendary paintings on the roof and walls of the chapel belonging to the ancient Guild of the Holy Cross in Stratford-on-Avon. Between 1812 and 1816 Fisher published ninety-five plates from his drawings of monumental and other remains in Bedfordshire. In 1838 John Gough Nichols added descriptions to a new edition. Meanwhile, Fisher had printed at the lithographic press of D. J. Redman thirty-seven drawings of 'Monumental Remains and Antiquities in the county of Bedford,' of which fifty copies were issued in 1828.

Fisher was one of the first to welcome lithography in the UK. As early as 1808 he published an account of it, under the title of 'Polyantography,' with a portrait of Philip H. André, its first introducer into England, in the 'Gentleman's Magazine,' vol. lxxviii. pt. i. p. 193. In 1807 he published in four lithographic plates. Shortly afterwards he issued several plates of monumental brasses to illustrate Edward Hasted's 'Kent' and Daniel Lysons's 'Environs of London.' In order to encourage the artist Hilkiah Burgess, Fisher had ten plates etched of 'Sepulchral Monuments in Oxford.' These were issued in 1836.

Many of the biographies of distinguished Anglo-Indians in the 'Gentleman's Magazine' were contributed by Fisher. That of Charles Grant, father of Lord Glenelg, was afterwards enlarged and printed for private circulation, London, 1833. He also likewise a contributor to the European Magazine, the Asiatic Journal, and to religious periodicals. He was one of the projectors of the Congregational Magazine, and from 1818 to 1823 ran its statistical department of that serial. When elected a guardian of Shoreditch, where he lived, he assisted John Ware, the vestry clerk, in the compilation of 'An Account of the several Charities and Estates held in trust for the use of the Poor of the Parish of St. Leonard, Shoreditch, Middlesex, and of Benefactors to the same,' 1836. He was an abolitionist, and in 1825 published 'The Negro's Memorial, or Abolitionist's Catechism. By an Abolitionist,' London. He was a member, too, of bible and missionary societies.

== Family ==
His father Thomas Fisher who died on 29 August 1786, was author of the "Kentish Traveller's Companion", 1777, and, with Samuel Denne, F.S.A., and William Shrubsole, of a short "History of Rochester" published in 1772.
