= Guilds in England =

In England, guilds emerged as voluntary associations formed for religious and social purposes. Over time they developed into frith guilds that assumed collective responsibility for the conduct and mutual aid of their members and often became integral to local governance, as seen in early London. By the reign of Canute, guilds possessed formal charters and dedicated guildhalls with activities blending social, religious and practical functions. As guilds evolved, they laid the foundation for later merchant and craft guilds, which played central roles in medieval England's economic life.

== Development ==
The earliest English mentions of guilds are found in the seventh century laws of Ine of Wessex but it is not clear that they were guild members in the later sense.

In 930 AD, when Æthelstan was ruling there are a set of regulation and merger of the London frith guilds, oath bound organisations responsible for mutual defence and maintaining civil order. Later, this concept expanded was used in Berwick-upon-Tweed where as well as keeping the law it was also used for external defence. These guilds were associations with a corporate responsibility for the good conduct of their members and their mutual liability. The main objects of these guilds was the preservation of peace, right, and liberty.

Guilds from early on had both religious and social functions with an example being the oldest surviving guild charter in Abbotsbury dating from Canute. Aethelstan's Dooms of London of 930 also shows guilds with some commercial arrangements such as primitive insurance and assistance in catching thieves foreshadowing the Gild Merchants of the eleventh century.

A continental system of guilds and merchants arrived in England after the Norman Conquest, with incorporated Gild Merchant, societies of merchants in each town or city holding exclusive rights of doing business there. These gave the towns a level of local self government comparable to medieval communes and proliferating to most substantial towns by the time of Edward I and containing almost all the important citizens. The gild merchants possessed extensive powers both on members who they could punish for dishonesty or breaching guild regulations as well as non members who could be fined for illicitly trading outside the guild's local monopoly. They could also protect members trading in other towns and supervise the quality of goods offered for sale. Guild merchants lost their residual power when Edward III in 1335 allowed foreign merchants to trade freely in England. There are survivals such as the Preston Guild merchant.

== Craft guilds ==
As merchant guilds became more exclusive craftsmen formed their own craft guilds. to try to break down the merchants local trade monopoly and supervise their own trades with weavers and fullers being the first crafts to obtain royal recognition of their guilds, and by 1130 they had guilds established in London, Lincoln, and Oxford. Craft guilds also functioned as artificial families rooted in mutual aid, friendship, and communal ritual. Members attended each other's funerals, celebrated shared feast days, and built an identity around their craft that went far deeper than economics.

The administration lay in the hands of wardens, bailiffs or masters with a long apprenticeship necessary before admission. The master craftsman was an independent producer, needing little or no capital, and employing journeymen and apprentices who hoped in time to become master craftsmen themselves, a progression seen by some commentators as negating the class struggle of the industrial era. The path to master was never guaranteed, and as guilds grew more closed and hereditary, the promise of upward mobility became increasingly hollow for those without the right connections or inherited wealth, making the class tensions more present.

== Religious and social aspects ==
The guilds cared for the interests both spiritual and temporal of their members, providing old age and sick pensions, pensions for widows and burial funds. The guilds where also present in the religious life of its members and were important in their towns' religious celebrations and festivities, and providing Masses for the souls of deceased members. They also would hold annual guild feasts.

Besides the merchant and craft guilds, the religious and social guilds continued to exist through the Middle Ages, being largely in the nature of confraternities. At the Reformation religious guilds were suppressed as superstitious foundations.

=== Religious guilds ===
Religious guilds were voluntary lay associations primarily for collective devotional, charitable and mutual-support purposes. They were usually attached to parish churches, monasteries or the cult of a particular saint, and their principal functions included praying for deceased members and providing funeral support. They tended to be prominent in sponsoring religious processions and mystery plays. Membership frequently crossed social boundaries and often included women as well as members of the urban elite. Religious guilds expanded rapidly in the 14th and 15th centuries, particularly following the spread of devotion to the Feast of Corpus Christi, but were suppressed during the English Reformation, unlike craft guilds which survived in modified form.

== London ==
Although London did not have a Gild Merchant, London's Guildhall became the seat of the Court of Common Council of the City of London Corporation, the world's oldest continuously elected local government, whose members to this day must be Freemen of the city. Guilds were central in the governance of London in the Middle Ages. The Freedom of the City, effective from the Middle Ages until 1835, gave the right to trade, and was only bestowed upon members of a Guild or Livery.

As the guild system of the City of London declined during the 17th century, the Livery Companies transformed into mutual assistance fraternities. More than 110 guilds, referred to as livery companies, survive today, with the oldest 871 years old. They still maintain a corporate existence for charitable and social purposes, although many have ceased to have close connections with the crafts, the names of which they bear. Other groups, such as the Worshipful Company of Tax Advisers, have been formed far more recently. Membership in a livery company is expected for individuals participating in the governance of The City, as the Lord Mayor and the Remembrancer.

== Bibliography ==
- Armitage, Frederick (1918). The old guilds of England. Weare & Company.
- Ashley, William (1888). Introduction to English Economic History and Theory. Vol. 1. London.
- Brentano, Lujo (1870). "Introduction". In Toulmin-Smith, Joshua (ed.). English Gilds; ordinances of over 100 English Gilds, with the usages of Winchester, Worcester, Bristol etc. Early English Text Society.
- Burton, Edwin; Marique, Pierre (1910). "Guilds" . In Herbermann, Charles (ed.). Catholic Encyclopedia. Vol. 7. New York: Robert Appleton Company.
- Carlson, Laura (2018). Workers, collectivism and the law.
- Gasquet, Francis Aidan (1900). Eve of the Reformation. London.
- Gross, Charles (1911). "Gilds" . In Chisholm, Hugh (ed.). Encyclopædia Britannica (11th ed.). Cambridge University Press.
- Lambert, Joseph Malet (1891). Two Thousand Years of Gild Life. Hull.
- Milnes, Alfred (1904). From Gild to Factory. London.
- Mortorff, Denise (2009). "Livery Company Records & Furthering Your Ancestry" (PDF). Archived (PDF) from the original on 2017-11-16. "1155 Charter - Worshipful Company of Weavers. The oldest recorded City Livery Company."
- Shaxson, Nicholas (2012). Treasure Islands: Tax Havens and the Men who Stole the World. Vintage. ISBN 978-0-09-954172-1.
- Scarisbrick, J. J. (1984). The Reformation and the English People. Oxford: Blackwell.
