= Master craftsman =

Occupational rank

Stone sculpture of stonemasons at work, tabernacle of the Guild of Stone and Wood Masters, Orsanmichele Church

Historically, a master craftsman or master tradesman (sometimes called only master or grandmaster) was a member of a craft guild. The title survives as the highest professional qualification in craft industries.

In the European guild system, only masters and journeymen were allowed to be members of the guild. An aspiring master would have to pass through the career chain from apprentice to journeyman before he could be elected to become a master craftsman. He would then have to produce a sum of money and a masterpiece before he could actually join the guild. If the masterpiece was not accepted by the masters, he was prohibited to join the guild and possibly remained a journeyman for the rest of his life.

== Role in different countries ==
=== Germany ===
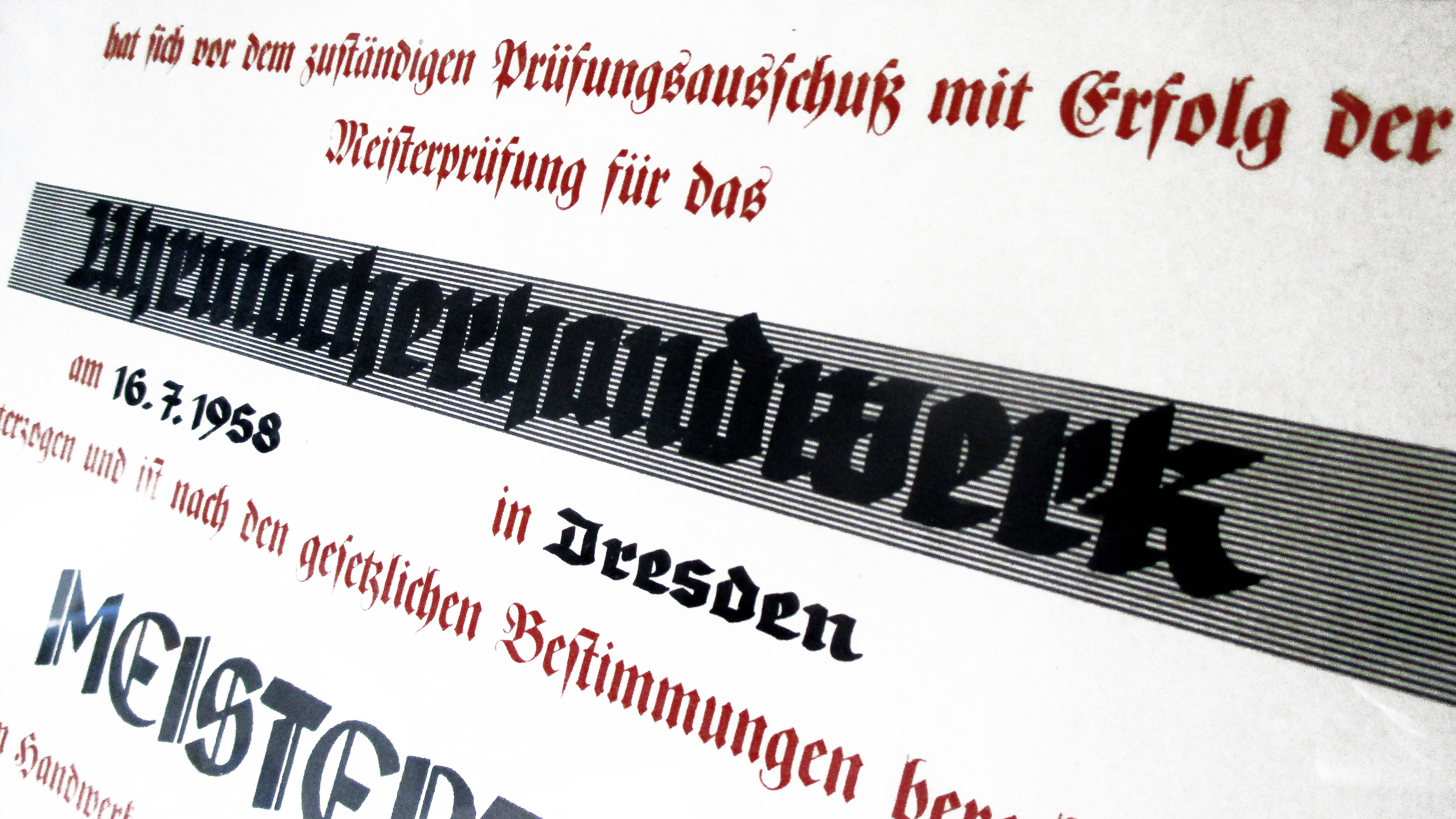
Master craftsman certificate – Handwerkskammer Dresden – July 7, 1958

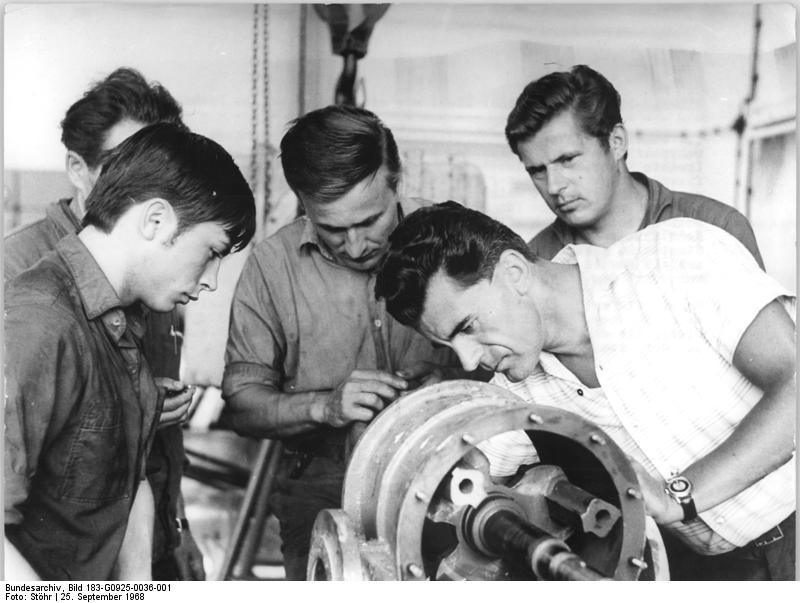
A master discusses a vacuum compressor with his apprentice boy and several other craftsmen.

In Germany, the master craftsman (Meister) is the highest professional qualification in crafts and is a state-approved grade. The certification is called Meisterbrief. The qualification includes theoretical and practical training in the craft as well as business and legal training. Additionally, it implies the qualification to train apprentices. These qualifications prepare the Meister for running their own business or alternatively for higher positions at a company. The status of master craftsmen is regulated in the German Gesetz zur Ordnung des Handwerks (Crafts and Trades Regulation Code).

Guilds have been abolished in Germany, but the ranks of apprentice (Lehrling), journeyman (Geselle) and master craftsman have been retained even through modern times. For safety-relevant crafts, e.g., electricians and chimney sweeps, any business in the trade has to be run by a master craftsman or has to employ at least one Meister.

Journeymen and master craftsmen are by law automatically members of their regional chamber of crafts (Handwerkskammer), which is a self-governing public body. The chamber organizes vocational training and oversees the examination of the journeymen and masters.

To become a master craftsman, it is usually required to have completed vocational training in the craft in which the examination is to be taken, culminating in a final examination called Gesellenprüfung (journeyman's examination). If these requirements are fulfilled, the candidate can take courses for the Meisterprüfung (master craftsman's examination). The duration of the courses takes 1 to 4 years depending on the craft and on the Course. The examination includes theoretical, practical and oral parts and takes 5 to 7 days (depending on the craft). In some crafts, the creation of a masterpiece is also part of the examination.

The German Meister qualifies the holder to study for a bachelor's degree at university, and is thus a university entrance qualification. According to the German Qualifications Framework, the Meisterbrief is at the same level as a bachelor's degree, even though it is not an academic degree and thus not directly comparable.

=== United Kingdom ===
This tradition originates in Medieval Europe. The earliest guilds were "frith" or peace guilds – groups bonded together for mutual protection following the breakdown of the kins, which were groups related by blood ties.

Merchant guilds – associations of international trades – were powerful in the twelfth and thirteenth centuries, but lost their ascendancy with the rise of the craft guilds – associations of master craftsmen, journeymen, apprentices and the various trades connected with a particular craft.

The College of Arms in London awarded a coat of arms of The Guild of Master Craftsmen in 1992, after four years of assessment. Designed by heraldic expert Peter Greenhill to reflect the many categories of guild membership, it features: three escutcheons (shields) to represent artists, painters and stainers; a pair of compasses opened in chevron for building, construction and carpentry; a dovetail (separating the top third of the shield from the rest) to represent cabinetmaking, woodworking and joinery; and a gavel and chisel for masons and stoneworkers. The southern keep of Lewes Castle, which overlooks the guild's headquarters, is featured above the helmet as the crest.

=== United States ===
While for the most part guilds as such do not exist, many trades continue the apprentice-journeyman-master model: carpenters, electricians, pipefitters and plumbers are notable examples. (Note: The tradition survives in academia, with elementary, middle and high school completing general education; with post secondary degrees awarded in the Associates, Bachelor and Master levels; and PhD students as apprentices, post-docs and associate professors as journeymen and full professors as masters. The United States Bartenders Guild grants bartenders the title of Master Mixologist through a series of tests.)

== See also ==
- Apprenticeship
- Vocational training
