= Guild of the Holy Cross =

The Guild of the Holy Cross could refer to:

- Guild of the Holy Cross (Birmingham)
- Guild of the Holy Cross (Stratford-upon-Avon)
