= Stratford-upon-Avon Guildhall =

Municipal building in Stratford-upon-Avon, Warwickshire, England

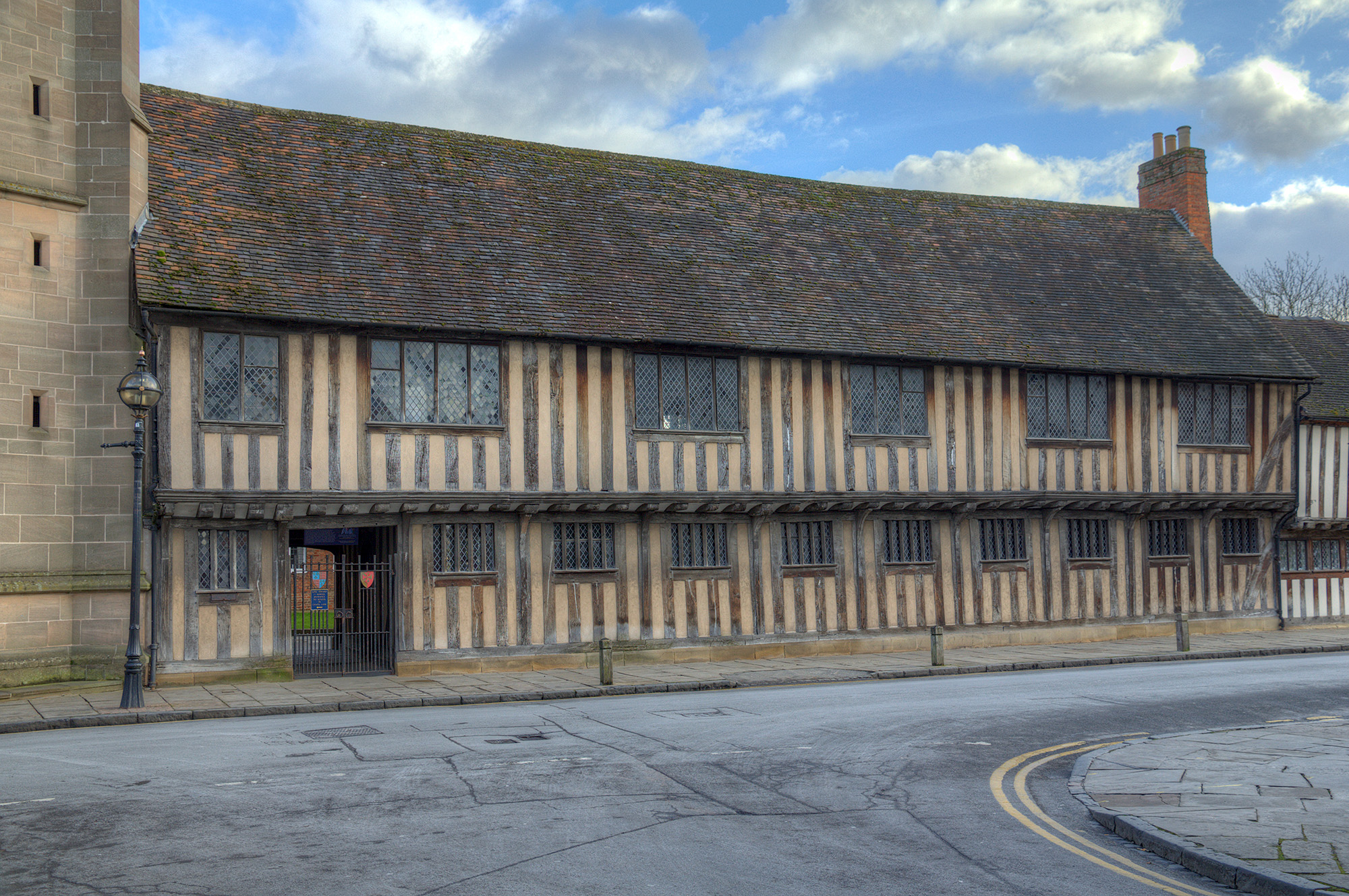
- The Guildhall
- Interactive map of Stratford-upon-Avon Guildhall
- 52.1904°N 1.7080°W
- Location: Stratford-upon-Avon, Warwickshire

History
- Built: 1417

Site notes
- Architectural style: Jettied timber framing

Listed Building – Grade I
- Official name: Guildhall, King Edward VI Grammar School
- Designated: 25 October 1951
- Reference no.: 1187780

The Guildhall in Stratford-upon-Avon is a historic building on Church Street, Stratford-upon-Avon, Warwickshire, England. It is a Grade I listed building. Dating from the early 15th century, the Guildhall was for centuries at the centre of life in Stratford, being used for assemblies, as a meeting place for the local council, and as a school building for the King Edward VI School. Most famously William Shakespeare almost certainly attended school here. The building was opened to the public in 2016, after being restored.

== History ==
=== Guild of the Holy Cross ===
The Guild of the Holy Cross, a religious guild, possessed a common hall from 1292 onwards. According to accounts, a new guildhall was built from 1417 and completed by the early 1420s. This can confidently be identified with the present building; tree-ring dating has shown that most of the dated timbers of the building were felled between 1410 and 1435. It is adjacent to the 13th century Guild Chapel and the almshouses.

The building has an upper and a lower hall. Guildhalls typically followed a hierarchical layout, with a high (dais) end for the guild elite and a low, service end. There is evidence of a longitudinal partition on the south side of the upper hall, suggesting that this was the low end which would have contained a buttery and a pantry. A corridor granted access both to these and to the south wing, an adjoining part of the building. The south wing is thought to have been used as a meeting room for the guild elite. In the late 16th century the upper floor of the south wing was used as a "harness" or "armour" chamber.

=== Stratford Corporation ===
After the dissolution of religious guilds and chantries under King Edward VI in 1547, the town's inhabitants petitioned for control of the building and secured ownership of it in 1553 after receiving a charter of incorporation. Like the guild, the Corporation continued to conduct meetings in the guildhall. By the time the Corporation was established, the manorial court leet was held in the guildhall; this was likely the continuation of an existing practice. A court of record was provided for in the charter of incorporation and also likely took place in the guildhall; as did the quarter sessions, for which the Corporation gained legal permission in 1601. Robert Bearman writes:

What would not seem to be in doubt is that, during the turbulent years of the sixteenth century, and for some time after that, the Guildhall and its ancillary buildings symbolised the principle of self-governance within the town, whether they were playing host to Corporation meetings, sessions of various courts... or the travelling players

In 1868 Corporation meetings were transferred to the town hall.

=== Theatre ===
In the 16th century the guildhall served as a venue for theatre. Beginning in 1568 there were over 30 visits to Stratford by travelling companies. Players were required by law to give a "command" performance before local authorities in order to obtain a license to perform in a town; the Stratford Corporation very likely hosted these in the guildhall. John Shakespeare, in his capacity as bailiff and later alderman, would have attended these performances. Theatre companies that performed in Stratford include the Queen's Men, the Earl of Worcester's players, and Leicester's Men; these troupes featured famous actors such as James Burbage, Edward Alleyn and Richard Tarlton. In 1602 the Corporation banned plays in civic buildings, including the guildhall, with a penalty of 10 shillings. In 1612 this fine was increased to £10 briefly, and then to 40 shillings.

=== School ===
Probably as early as the 1560s, and certainly by the 18th century, King Edward VI School moved into the upper floor of the Guildhall. William Shakespeare attended the school as a child in the 1570s. The building continues to be used by the school today. It was restored at a cost of £1.8 million, with support from the Heritage Lottery Fund, between July 2015 and April 2016. The restoration included treatment of the timbers and conservation of the medieval iconography. The guildhall was then opened to the public in April 2016.

== Iconography ==
Restoration work in the 19th century uncovered 15th-century iconography on the south wall of the lower hall, which constituted a reredos for a small chapel that existed in this part of the hall. The painting, based on the seal of the guild, features Christ on the cross in the centre, God behind him, and figures thought to be Mary and John the Evangelist on either side. In 2016, conservation work led to the discovery of the figure of John the Baptist to the right of these paintings. This figure is far more clear than the others, perhaps because it lies on a stud rather than one of the intervening panels. Also featured are the quartered royal arms of England and France (England claimed sovereignty over France in the 15th century), as well as the arms of the Beauchamp-Despenser family. The Beauchamp family included the Earls of Warwick who held much influence in Stratford. Its thought that the painting was concealed during the Reformation and possibly lime-washed when the guild was dissolved in 1547.

== Design ==
The design made extensive use of jettied timber framing and featured an entrance to the left end bay with iron gates at ground floor level and six leaded windows at first floor level; there was a wing to the south-east. Internally, the design included a main hall, with a stone floor and chamfered ceiling beams, on the ground floor and two rooms, with spine beam, on the first floor.
