= The Greyfriars' Chronicle =

The Greyfriars Chronicle may refer to:

- Chronicle of the Greyfriars of London, commonly known as Greyfriars' Chronicle
- The Grey Friars' Chronicle documenting Black Death in England
- Chronicle of the Expulsion of the Greyfriars
