= Almshouses, Stratford-upon-Avon =

Grade I listed almshouses in Stratford-upon-Avon, United Kingdom

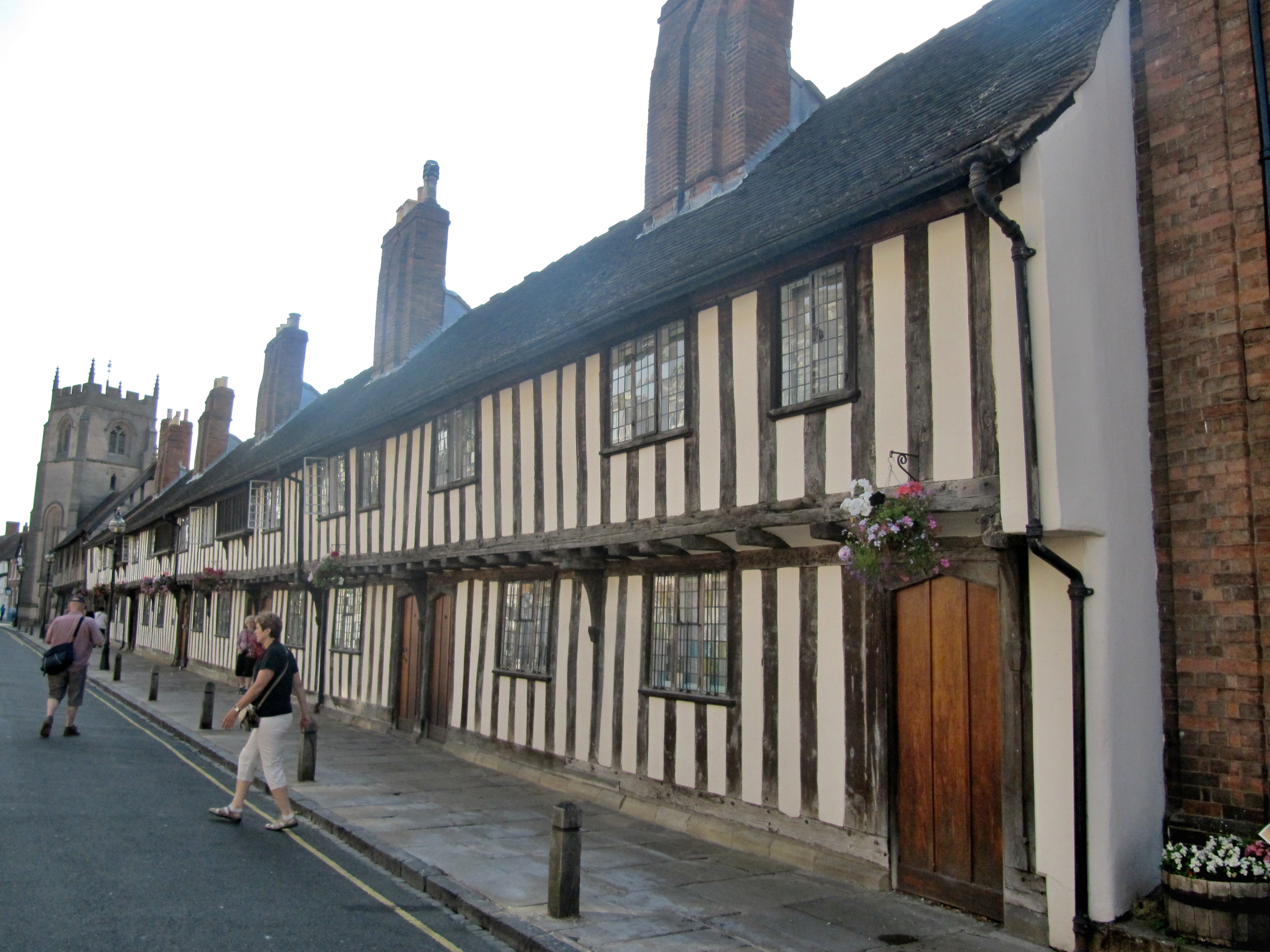
- The almshouses
- Interactive map of Almshouses, Stratford-upon-Avon
- 52.1902°N 1.7084°W
- Location: Stratford-upon-Avon, Warwickshire, England

History
- Built: 16th century

Site notes
- Restored: 1892, 1982–84

Listed Building – Grade I
- Official name: The Almshouses
- Designated: 25 October 1951
- Reference no.: 1298549

The almshouses on Church Street in Stratford-upon-Avon are a row of Grade I listed 16th century almshouses. They were built by the Guild of the Holy Cross, and adjoin the guildhall. The almshouses remain in use as housing.

== Construction ==
The earliest reference to almshouses in the surviving accounts comes in 1406, when stone was bought for the guildhall and almshouses. Three almshouses were built between 1411 and 1417, potentially to replace previous ones that had burnt down. In his will, proved in 1503, mercer and guild member Thomas Hannys allocated £200 for the enlargement of the almshouses:

a place quadrant beyng in length every wey lxxv foote or theruppon, where as the olde almeshouse now be And to be made with an hall a Parlour, buttrey, kechen and a littell oratory for a chapell havyng other chambres both byneth and above for lodgynd the seid poore people convenyently and made to there ease with chymneys and draughtes thereto necessaries moche after the patron and forme of a platt therefore drawen by me and hereunto annexed

It has been assumed that this plan was never fully carried out, though recent dating proves that it was at least partially implemented. As they currently stand, the structure and appearance of the almshouses suggest an early 16th century date of construction.

Hannys' will described the almshouses as "adioynyng next unto the Scolehowse". The schoolhouse was built around 1428 and in use until the 1560s when the King Edward VI School moved to the upper floor of the guildhall. It has been proposed that the northernmost almshouse was the schoolhouse; this is based on the fact that from 1555 schoolmaster William Dallam occupied "the chamber next the house or hall lately called the guild hall", in a building later described as being "some time imployed to a schole house". It has a slightly different construction to the other almshouses; it abuts the guildhall and is itself abutted by the other almshouses, suggesting it was built after the former but before the latter.

== Use ==
The almshouses housed the poor, including those who had recently fallen on hard times. Inhabitants of the almshouses were provided with bread and ale, and probably a weekly salary, and the guild paid some or all of their funeral expenses. Some of the upper rooms were let out. When the guild was abolished, the almshouses were transferred in 1553 to the Stratford-upon-Avon Corporation. The charter of incorporation stipulated that the corporation was to be responsible for maintaining 24 people in the almshouses.

They were restored in 1892, and again during 1982–84. They became Grade I listed in 1951. Since their 1980s refurbishment, the almshouses today provide eleven housing units, each of which has its own kitchen and bathroom. To the rear, there is a communal lounge and garden, and a resident warden. They have been continuously occupied for over 500 years.
