= Shrubsole =

Shrubsole is an English habitational surname originating in Kent. Notable people with the surname include:

- Alison Shrubsole (1925–2002), British educationist and university administrator
- Anya Shrubsole (born 1991), English cricketer
- Guy Shrubsole, British researcher, writer and campaigner.
- William Shrubsole (1760–1806), English musician and composer
- William Shrubsole (minister) (1729–1797), English nonconformist minister and author
