= Guild Chapel =

Church in Stratford-upon-Avon, Warwickshire, England

Guild Chapel of the Holy Cross
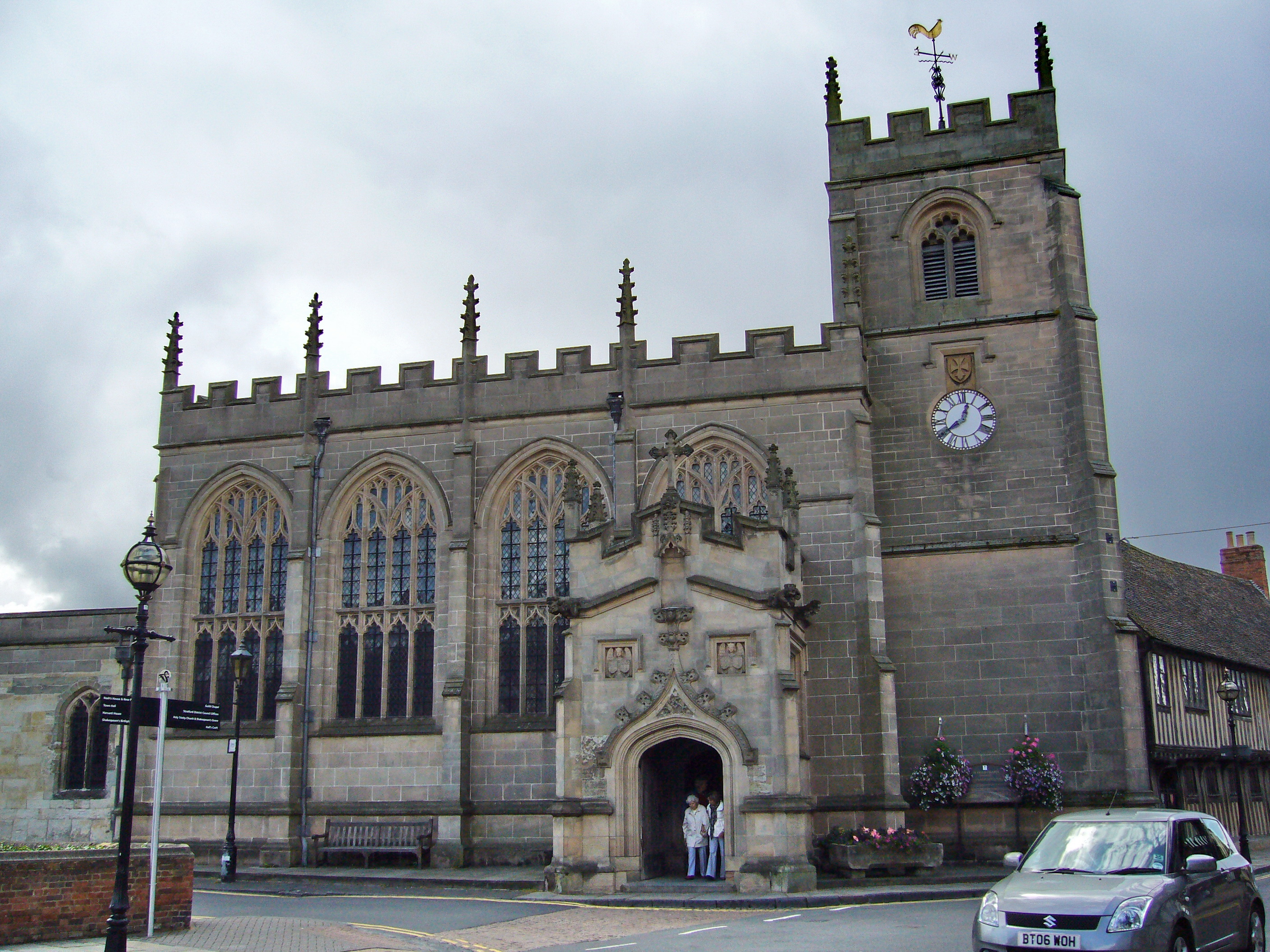
- The chapel from Church Street
- Interactive map of Guild Chapel of the Holy Cross
- 52.1905°N 1.7077°W
- Location: Stratford-upon-Avon, Warwickshire

History
- Built: 13th century

Site notes
- Architectural style: Perpendicular Gothic
- Governing body: Stratford Town Trust

Listed Building – Grade I
- Official name: Guild Chapel of the Holy Cross
- Designated: 25 October 1951
- Reference no.: 1204554

The Guild Chapel of the Holy Cross, Stratford-upon-Avon, Warwickshire is a chapel of 13th-century origins. Founded by the Guild of the Holy Cross, it passed into the control of the town corporation in 1553, when the guild was suppressed by Edward VI. The chapel stands on Church Street, opposite the site of William Shakespeare's home, New Place. In his 1496 will, Hugh Clopton paid for a major expansion of the chapel.

The chapel was restored in a thirty-year programme undertaken by Stephen Dykes Bower from 1954-1983 and is a Grade I listed building. Owned and maintained by the Stratford-upon-Avon Town Trust, the chapel is used for services by King Edward VI School.

== History ==
=== Construction ===
The Guild of the Holy Cross was a medieval religious membership foundation that became a powerful societal force in Stratford-upon-Avon. A 1269 charter gave the guild permission to build a chapel, where service for the souls of members' ancestors was to be conducted. It is not known when exactly the original chapel was built, but 13th century fabric has been found in the chancel. The chapel was refurbished in the 1420s, and the chancel was rebuilt around 1450. It is thought that the nave was not built until the late 15th century, when merchant and former mayor of London Hugh Clopton (c.1440–1496) left money in his will to pay for work on the chapel.

=== Reformation ===
Upon Henry VIII's death in early 1547, the new administration under Edward VI introduced a programme of radical Protestant reform. The dissolution of the chantries spelled an end to the guild, whose former possessions were repurchased by the town in 1553 when Stratford was granted a charter of incorporation. In November 1547, commissioners arrived in Stratford requiring the destruction of shrines and the covering of all "monuments of feigned miracles, pilgrimages, idolatory [sic] and superstition". Churchwardens' accounts for other Warwickshire churches like St Mary's record these instructions being carried out, including the taking down of rood lofts, dismantling of altars, and whitewashing. Though accounts for Stratford have not survived, it likely underwent the same changes. The guild chapel, described in the 1553 charter as "all that former chapel", seems to have fallen into disuse in these years.

When Mary I came to power she reversed some of these changes, and mass was again held in the chapel. When Elizabeth I took the throne, she had places of worship once again purged of Catholic associations in 1559, and the guild chapel became redundant once more. Iconography that had survived Edward's reign (or had been restored under Mary) was removed under Elizabeth. The earliest surviving evidence of iconoclasm in the chapel are in the accounts of John Shakespeare, during his time as chamberlain of the Stratford Corporation. Between 1562 and 1564 two payments of 2 shillings were made: first for "defasyng ymages in ye chapell" and then for "takynge doune ye rood loft in ye Chapell". This seems to have been done in preparation for the use of the chapel in 1564, when preachers were invited to Stratford.

== Wall paintings ==
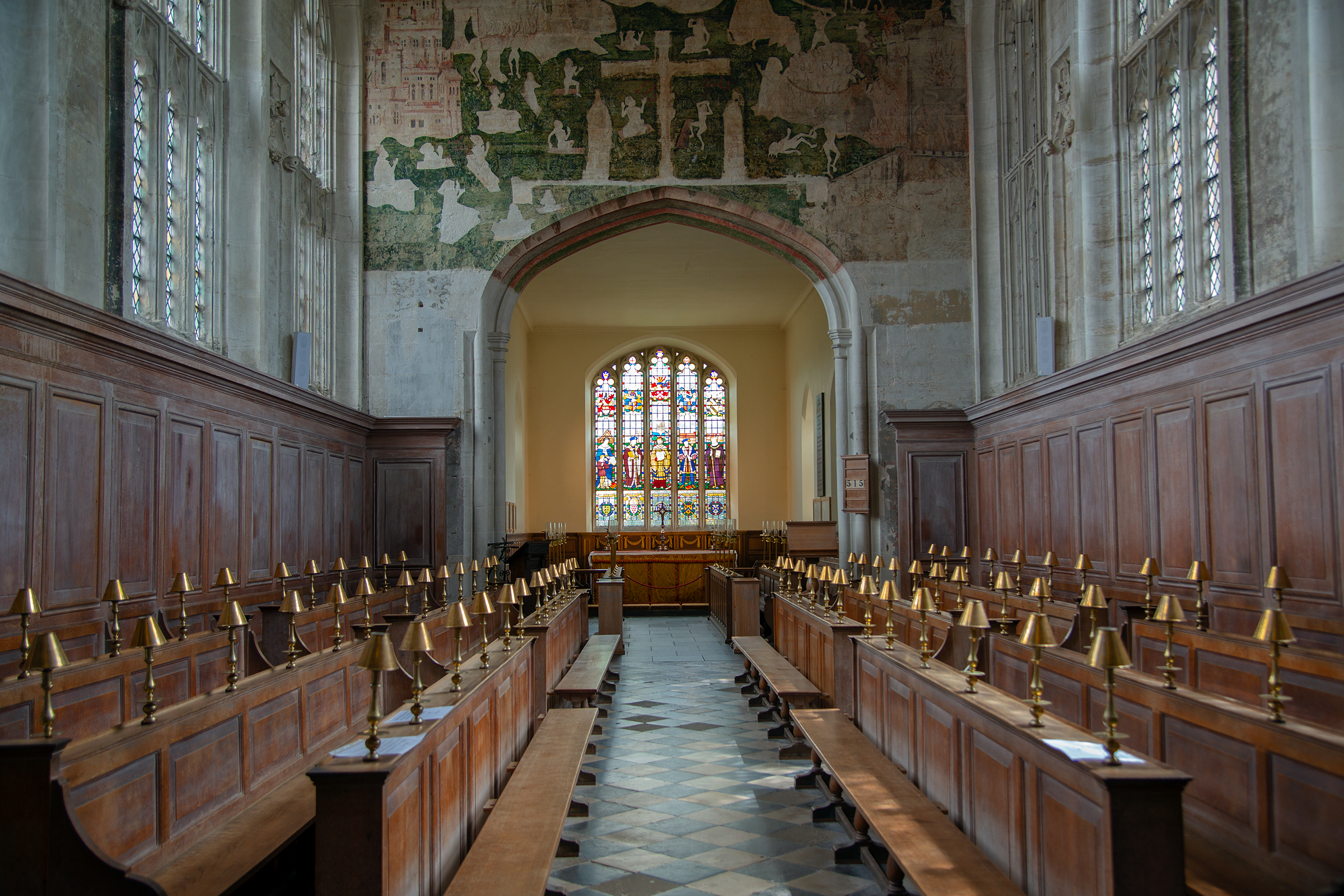
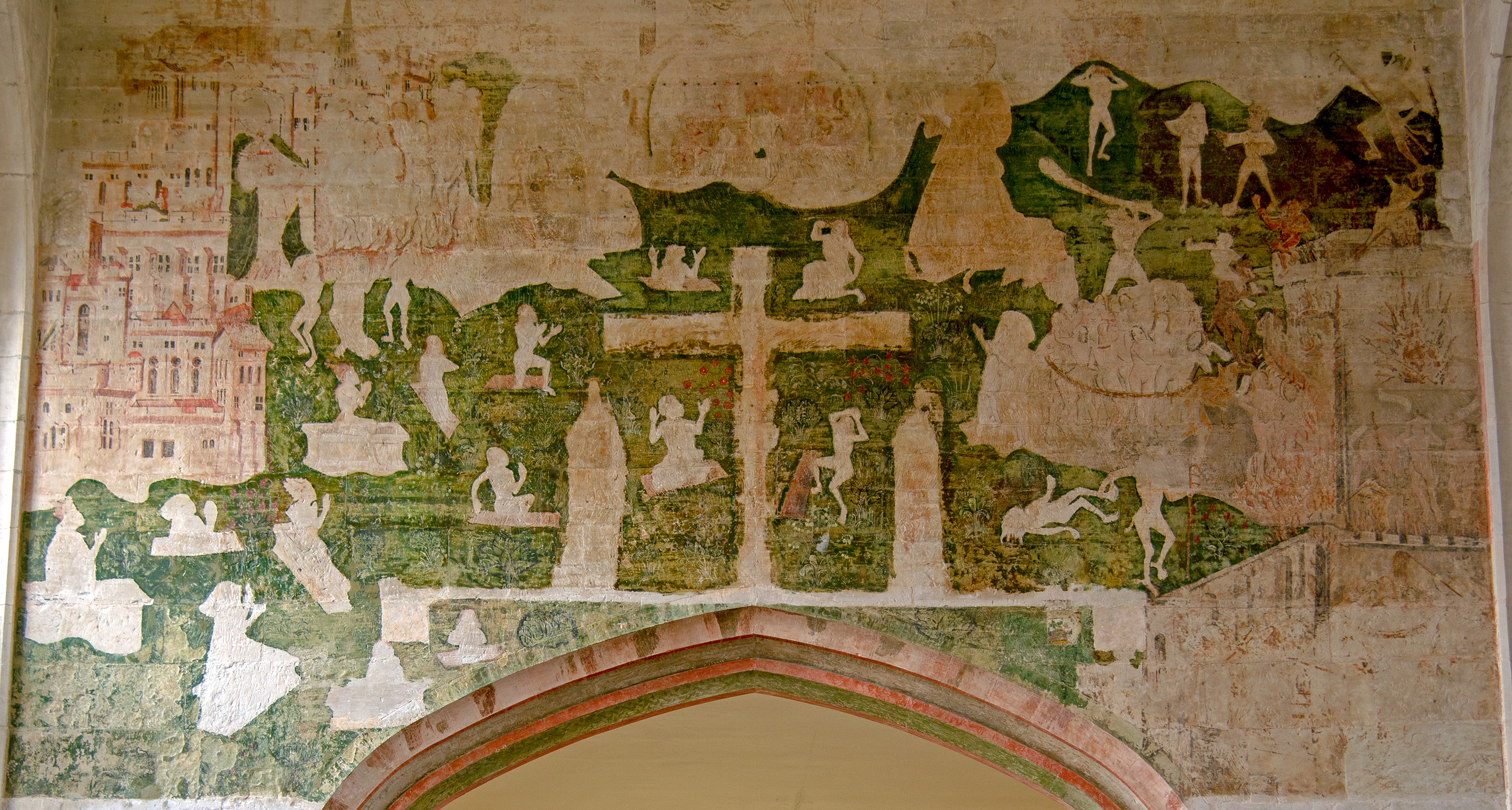
Interior of the Guild Chapel, showing the uncovered Doom painting above the chancel

Restoration work in 1804 uncovered a number of wall paintings throughout the chapel. These were described in detail at the time by Robert Wheler, and drawn by Thomas Fisher; the drawings were published by John Gough Nichols in 1838. The chancel contained images of the legend of the discovery of the True Cross. Over the chancel arch was a "Doom", or Last Judgment painting, featuring Christ sitting on a rainbow, above a rood, and St John the Baptist and Mary on either side of him. Some paintings remained undiscovered: in 1576 John Stow remarked, in an annotation of his edition of the Itinerary of John Leland, that the Dance of Death (Danse Macabre) had been painted around the nave. During restoration work in 1955 Wilfrid Puddephat, art master at King Edward VI School, found traces of the Dance of Death paintings and reconstructed their original appearance.

After the paintings were recorded in the early 19th century, those in the nave were once again covered in whitewash, and those in the chancel, which were painted on plaster that had deteriorated, were destroyed. In 1928, the Last Judgment painting was re-exposed by Ernest William Tristram.

A major programme of archaeological investigation, carried out by the Department of Archaeology at the University of York in the early 21st century and making innovative use of digital modelling, described the chapel as "one of Europe's most important surviving late-medieval Guild Chapels".

A restoration project undertaken in 2016 won the Society for the Protection of Ancient Buildings John Betjeman award in 2017.

The "Great Bell", a curfew bell cast in 1633, was renovated in 2018.

== Architecture and description ==
The chancel is 13th century, with the nave and tower dating from Hugh Clopton's rebuilding on c.1490.

== Sources ==
- Pickford, Chris; Pevsner, Nikolaus (2016). Warwickshire. The Buildings Of England. New Haven, CT and London: Yale University Press. ISBN 978-0-300-21560-1. OCLC 953624003.
- Rosser, Gervase (2015). The Art of Solidarity in the Middle Ages: Guilds in England 1250-1550. New Haven, CT and London: Oxford University Press. ISBN 978-0-1910-1755-1.
