= Henry Shaw (antiquary) =

British antiquarian

Henry Shaw (1800–1873) was an English architectural draughtsman, engraver, illuminator, and antiquary.

== Life ==
Shaw was born in London on 4 July 1800. He was elected a Fellow of the Society of Antiquaries of London in 1833. He died at Broxbourne, Hertfordshire, on 12 June 1873.

== Works ==
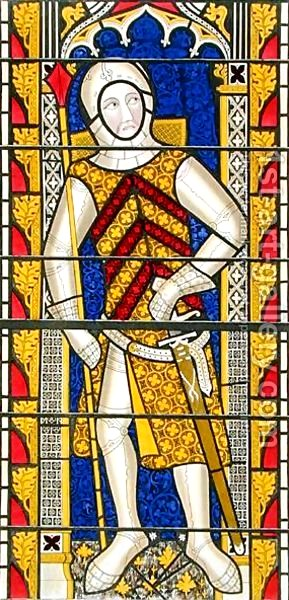
Stained glass window of c.1340 in Tewkesbury Abbey Church, by Shaw.

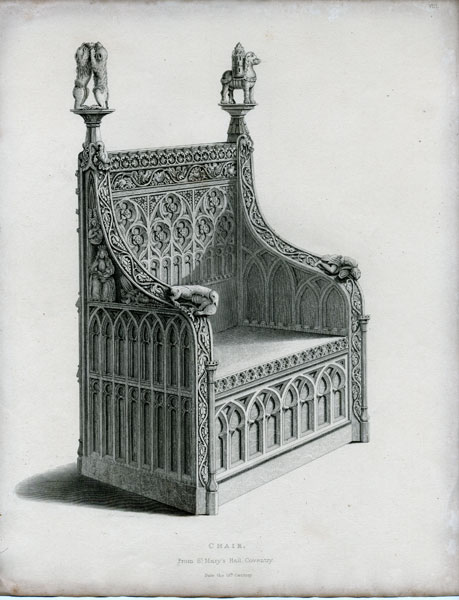
Medieval chair from St Mary's Hall in Coventry, period Henry VI/Edward IV. Drawing by Shaw from Specimens of Ancient Furniture (1836).

Shaw was employed by John Britton on his Cathedral Antiquities of England, supplying illustrations of Wells Cathedral and Gloucester. In 1823 he published A Series of Details of Gothic Architecture, and in 1829 he published The History and Antiquities of the Chapel at Luton Park with plates drawn and engraved by himself. Luton Park was destroyed by fire in 1843. Other antiquarian works were:

- Illuminated Ornaments, selected from Manuscripts and early printed books, with text by Sir Frederic Madden, 1833;
- Examples of Ornamental Metal Work, 1836;
- Specimens of Ancient Furniture, with descriptions by Samuel Rush Meyrick, 1836;
- Ancient Plate and Furniture from the Colleges of Oxford and the Ashmolean Museum, also with text by Meyrick, 1837;
- Specimens of the Details of Elizabethan Architecture with descriptions by Thomas Moule, 1839;
- The Encyclopædia of Ornament 1842;
- Dresses and Decorations of the Middle Ages 1843;
- The Fishmongers' Pageant, on Lord Mayor's Day, 1616: Chrysanaleia, the Golden Fishing, devised by Anthony Munday with introduction by John Gough Nichols, 1844;
- Alphabets, Numerals, and Devices of the Middle Ages 1845;
- Decorative Arts, ecclesiastical and civil, of the Middle Ages 1851;
- The Hand Book of Mediæval Alphabets and Devices 1853;
- The Arms of the Colleges of Oxford 1855;
- Specimens of Tile Pavements 1858; and
- Handbook of the Art of Illumination as practised during the Middle Ages 1866.

He contributed papers to the Proceedings of the Society of Antiquaries, including an 'Account of the Remains of a Tile Pavement recently found within the precincts of Chertsey Abbey, Surrey' (Proceedings, 1856, iii. 269–77). He edited in 1848 a reproduction of Walter Gidde's 'Booke of sundry Draughtes principally seruing for Glaziers, and not impertinent for Plasterers and Gardeners,' originally published in 1615. He also designed or adapted, and drew on wood, the initial letters and all the decorative portions of Longman's edition of the New Testament, published in 1864.
