= Richard Spender =

Poet and soldier

- Born: 21 June 1921; Hereford, England
- Died: 28 March 1943 (aged 21); Sedjenane, Tunisia
- Burial place: Tabarka Ras Rajel War Cemetery, Tunisia
- Military career
- Allegiance: United Kingdom
- Branch: British Army
- Service years: 1941–1943
- Rank: Captain
- Service number: 184635
- Unit: 2nd Parachute Battalion
- Conflicts: Second World War, Operation Torch

Richard Willian Osborne Spender, also known as Dicky Spender, was a British poet and officer in the British Army during The Second World War. He served as a paratrooper in the North African campaign and was killed in action at the Battle of Sedjenane whilst leading a charge against a German machine gun position. He was recognised as a poet during his life and has been celebrated posthumously.

== Early life ==
Spender was born in Hereford, the youngest of four children, and son of Frank Osborne Spender and Elizabeth Ann Spender, of Letchworth. His family briefly lived in London before moving to Stratford-upon-Avon in Warwickshire where Spender attended King Edward VI School from 1930 to 1940, where he was Captain of School. He was accepted to read Modern History at St Catherine's College, Oxford, but instead decided to enlist in the British Army.

== Military service ==
After enlistment, Spender was assigned to the Gloucestershire Regiment, and received his officer training at 163 Officer Cadet Training Unit at Royal Military College Sandhurst from January to April 1941. He was commissioned into the Royal Ulster Rifles. In autumn 1941 he became an instructor with 47 Division and later GHQ Battle School, where he played the part of 'Casey' in a training film entitled 'The Fighting Section Leader.'

In September 1942 he was assigned to the 2nd Parachute Battalion, before it was transported to North Africa take part in Operation Torch, parachuting behind enemy lines to destroy aircraft on the ground at Depienne and Oudna airfields. The delay in linking forces and subsequent costly withdrawal inspired Spender to write the poem 'The Parachute Battalion.'

After this, the 1st Parachute Brigade was given a ground role, involved in fighting German and Italian forces in Tunisia. During the 2nd battle of Tamera on 27–28 March 1943, the battalion had successfully driven the enemy off their objectives and came under a heavy counterattack by German paratroopers and regular infantry.

C Company were threatened with encirclement, and to prevent this, Spender charged German machine gun positions and was killed. Before his death, his commanding officer reported that Spender had managed to kill four Germans in his charge.

== Poetry ==
By the time of his death at age 21, Spender was already a well regarded and published poet, his poems appearing in publications including The Times Literary Supplement, The Observer, Punch, Country Life, and John O' London's Weekly.

He was described once by the Daily Telegraph as the Rupert Brooke of the Second World War, and three collections of his poetry were published as books by Sidgwick and Jackson.

== Legacy ==
Because of his connection to King Edward VI School in Stratford, when the house system at the school was reformed into four houses in 2000, it was decided that one should be named after Spender, with the colour purple.

Opened in 2017, a £2.2 million building housing the new school library as well as English and Computer science departments was named in his honour.
