= John Stockdale Hardy =

English legal practitioner and antiquary

John Stockdale Hardy (1793–1849) was an English legal practitioner known as an antiquary.

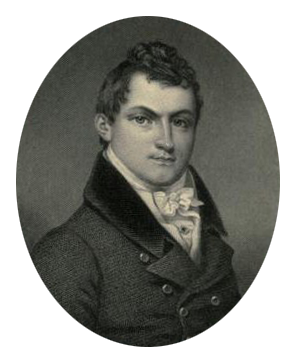
John Stockdale Hardy

== Life ==
Born at Leicester 7 October 1793, he was the only child of William Hardy, a manufacturer there. After education in a private school in Leicester, he was admitted a proctor and notary public, and became a practitioner in the ecclesiastical courts.

On the death of his maternal uncle William Harrison, Hardy succeeded him as registrar of the archdeaconry court of Leicester, of the court of the commissary of the Bishop of Lincoln, and of the court of the peculiar and exempt jurisdiction of the manor and soke of Rothley. In 1826 he was elected a Fellow of the Society of Antiquaries of London.

Hardy was known for his anti-Catholic polemics. In 1828 George Kenyon, 2nd Baron Kenyon and Lord Howe used him as a campaigner, in an effort to turn Leicestershire against Catholic emancipation. He retained all his legal appointments till his death at Leicester on 19 July 1849.

== Works ==
Hardy's Literary Remains were collected by John Gough Nichols, and published at Westminster in 1852. They included essays on ecclesiastical law, essays and speeches on political questions, and biographical, literary, and miscellaneous essays.
