= Charles Buck (minister) =

British minister and writer

Charles Buck (1771–1815) was an English Independent minister and theological writer, known for his Theological Dictionary.

== Life ==
Most information about Buck's life comes from extracts from his diaries and letters found in Memoirs and remains of the late Rev. Charles Buck edited by John Styles and published in 1817.

=== Through completing formal education ===
Buck was born in 1771 in the village of Hillsley near Wotton Underedge, Gloucestershire. He began his formal education in a boarding school in Hillsley run by the Rev William Hitchman, a Baptist minister. He left school at age 13 "to give himself up," as he wrote, "to amusement and folly."

The next year (1785) Buck went to London where he was "admitted into the office of an attorney" for the study and practiced law. In London, Buck says he was "just about launching into all the dissipations and licentiousness of the profligate" and was on the "very brink of destruction". More specifically, he wrote that "almost every evening found me at the theatre".

Buck does not describe what he saw or did at the theatre that he considered immoral, but the history of the London theater gives clues. At the beginning of the 18th century, the Rev. Jeremy Collier's pamphlet, A Short View of the Immorality and Profaneness of the English Stage (S. Keble, 1698) was in print. Collier denounced the theater's "immoral characters and situations" and attacks on clergy.

During the 18th century "huge crowds" attended theaters and some engaged in immoral behavior. "In front of the stage, young men would drink together, eat nuts and mingle with prostitutes down below in the notorious ‘pit’." The Beggar's Opera filled with immorality retained its theatrical hold in England throughout the 18th century.

Immoral or not, Buck said that he attended the theater almost daily. However, a Mr. Thomas Atkins introduced Buck to "a sincere and zealous Christian" young man who encouraged Buck to read the Bible. Buck said that this opened him to "a new world" and began to change his life. Regarding this experience, Buck asked, "does conversion make a man an angel?" and answered, "surely not." He goes on to say that after his conversion, "the old temptation" was still there. In a letter of 19 April 1794, Buck suggested that the old temptation was still present because he said that he had been reading Thomas Brooks, Precious Remedies Against Satan's Devices (E. Baines, 1799).

Buck made his first effort at preaching when he was "a little more than fifteen" to a congregation of "a few pious friends." Afterward, he felt "abashed and discouraged," but with his friends encouragement he persevered.

In 1789, Buck was confirmed in the Church of England and partook of the Lord's Supper for the first time. That same year (1789) while listening to a sermon in Bow Church, Buck began to think of "entering the ministry." To begin preparation, he put himself under the patronage of the Rev. Thomas Wills of Silver Street Chapel, London, who treated Buck as a son always welcomed at his table with "free access to his library." In later years, Buck signed some of his letters to Mr. Wills as "Your obedient son."

At age eighteen, Buck first preached from a pulpit. There are examples of notable preachers who began preaching at a younger age. Rev. Robert Aspland began preaching at age sixteen, and Rev. Thomas Harrison started "when he was about seventeen."

In the spring of 1790, Buck accompanied Mr. Wills on an extended "preaching-tour" to four places across southern England. In his diary, Buck listed the many sermons he preached. He was back in London on Tuesday 25 May 1790.

Preaching requires "much application, constant reading, and fervent prayer. The work is arduous, and ought not be attended to in a superficial manner."

After returning to London, Buck resumed his "secular employment" as a lawyer and his work at Silver Street chapel with Mr. Wills. Buck wrote that "he was heard with attention and pleasure by numerous congregations," but that he was "derided and ridiculed" by other lawyers.

Although Buck had "engaged in much public preaching," at age 19 he recognized that his "classical knowledge was but small" and his "theological attainments" were "superficial." Therefore, under Mr. Wills patronage, Buck enrolled in the newly established Hoxton Academy. Buck left no information about his student days at Hoxton, but he tells how busy he was with preaching engagements, He tells about one in Bristol, 120 miles/193 km from London. He traveled by stagecoach, arriving Saturday 30 July 1791.

In a letter dated 14 April 1794, to Mr Wills from Banbury (76 miles/122 km) from London, Buck said that he wanted to get back to the Academy for the "last three weeks or month of my time." Although he was often absent from the Academy, Buck wrote about his "constant reading."

In 1794, Buck passed his "examination and preaching before the Evangelical Society at Hoxton," as he wrote, with eclat. Buck later served as secretary to the Hoxton Academy.

=== Ministerial career ===
Three important events in Buck's life happened in 1795: he married, he accepted a call to Sheerness, and he was ordained to the pastoral office.

Marriage. The Bucks produced six children, two of whom died in childhood. His wife cared for Buck during his "premature decline" and survived him.

Sheerness. At Sheerness, Buck was an assistant to the pastor, Rev. William Shrubsole. They worked together harmoniously as father and son.

Ordained. Rev. William Shrubsole, the pastor of the Independent Church in Sheerness, had suffered a paralytic stroke, so Buck was "publicly ordained as co-pastor with him." After which the two worked together "in Christian harmony" until Rev. Shrubsole's death on 7 February 1797. After that, Buck remained in Sheerness for about two more years before returning to London. In spite of the fact that Buck ministered with "exemplary zeal and diligence," the congregation waned because of other events.

In 1797 Buck took charge of "a large boarding school" at Hackney. However, the combination of his school career and his preaching became too much, so Buck devoted himself to preaching. On 3 December 1797 Buck began preaching in the newly acquired Princes Street Chapel, Moorfields. During his time at Princes Street Chapel, Buck was chosen to be a director of the Missionary Society and later became a Trustee and Stated Contributor of the Evangelical Magazine.

In 1802, the owner of the Princes Street Chapel sold the property and the chapel was torn down. From 1802 to 1804, Buck and his congregation occupied the Meeting-house at Camomile Street. In December 1804, they moved to Wilson Street.

In 1811, Buck made his final move, to the City Chapel, Grub Street (later Milton Street). He ministered there until 1812 when illness terminated his ability to continue as pastor. At the beginning of his long illness, Buck continued to write and sometimes preached. However, in a letter of 1813, he described his affliction: unable to walk, blind in one eye, and in pain. Nevertheless, whenever he was able, he preached and wrote until just before his death.

Buck died on 11 August 1815 at the age of forty-four. He was buried in Bunhill Fields.

== Works ==
1. Theological Dictionary, Two Volumes in One

Buck wrote A Theological Dictionary (1802). The first edition appeared in London in 2 vols., to which John Collett Ryland was a major contributor; there were further British and American editions. He was also author of other religious works, and a Collection of Anecdotes, 1799, which went through numerous editions.

Buck's Dictionary was a significant work in antebellum America, running to 50 reprints. It was conservative and evangelical in editorial line, making it a counterbalance to the A View of Religions (1817) of Hannah Adams which was of Unitarian and liberal tendency. Adams's British editor, the Calvinist bookseller Thomas Williams, was much influenced by Buck's work in producing his Dictionary of All Religions. Adams then adopted some of the ideas she found in Williams. George Bush (biblical scholar), who edited an American edition of 1830, stated that

Notices of all or nearly all the existing religious denominations of the United States are given, accompanied with historical sketches and ecclesiastical statistics.

Richard Knight of Tennessee, who became a Baptist preacher, was taught to read by his wife, but "never got further in 'book learning' than the Bible and hymn book, and Buck's Theological Dictionary." It was cited as an authority by Finis Ewing; J. L. Wilson, an opponent, attacked its article on ministerial education. The American editions by William Woodward were expanded and revised: Ewing and Richard Donnell had written on the Cumberland Presbyterian Church for the 1814 edition. Woodward had produced an edition by 1807, which was adopted as a textbook.

A British reissue was edited by Ebenezer Henderson. For the 1833 edition, Henderson added 500 articles. He oversaw a further edition, in 1841. There was a German translation by Joseph Ehrenfried.

2. Miscellaneous Works of the Rev. Charles Buck, Author of the Theological Dictionary . . .

- Miscellaneous Works of the Rev. Charles Buck, Author of the Theological Dictionary . . . , Volume I (Philadelphia: W. W. Woodward, 1808)
- Miscellaneous Works of the Rev. Charles Buck, Author of the Theological Dictionary . . . , Volume II (Philadelphia: W. W. Woodward, 1808)
- Miscellaneous Works of the Rev. Charles Buck, Author of the Theological Dictionary . . . , Volume III (Philadelphia: W. W. Woodward, 1808)

3. Memoir of the Life and Death of Mr. Thomas Atkins (London, 1812)

4. The Young Christian's Guide; Or, Suitable Directions, Cautions, and Encouragement to the Believer on His First Entrance into the Divine Life (London: J. Haddon, 4th edition 1814)

5. The Practical Expositor: Or, Scripture Illustrated by Facts, and Arranged for Every Day in the Year (Philadelphia: W. W. Woodward, 1815)

6. Serious Enquiries: Or, Important Questions Relative to this World and That Which Is to Come; to Which Are Added, Reflections on Mortality Occasioned by the Death of Rev. Thomas Spencer, 2nd edition (London: Dove, 1815)

7. John Styles, ed, Memoirs and remains of the late Rev. Charles Buck . . . (London: Printed for and sold by the widow, 1817)

Book contains "copious Extracts from his Diary: and interesting letters to his friends; interspersed with various observations explanatory and illustrative of his character and works"

8. Works of the Rev Charles Buck, Late Minister of the Gospel, in Six Volumes

- Volume I (Philadelphia: McCarthy & Davis, 1822, First American Edition Complete)

- Volume II (Philadelphia: McCarthy & Davis, 1822, First American Edition Complete)

- Volume III (Philadelphia: McCarthy & Davis, 1822, First American Edition Complete)

- Volume IV (Philadelphia: McCarthy & Davis, 1822, First American Edition Complete)

- Volume V (Philadelphia: McCarthy & Davis, 1822, First American Edition Complete)

- Volume VI (Philadelphia: McCarthy & Davis, 1822, First American Edition Complete)

9. John Styles, ed, Memoirs and Remains of the Late Rev. Charles Buck . . . (London: Hamilton, Adams & Company, 1825)

10. Missionary Fidelity Enforced and its Reward Exhibited. Being a Charge Delivered...on the 26th, of January 1809 (Mission Press, 1828)

11. Anecdotes, Religious, Moral, and Entertaining: Two Volumes in One (J. C. Riker, 1831)

12. A Treatise on Religious Experience: its Nature, Evidences and Advantages (Board of Publication of the Reformed Protestant Dutch Church, 1855)

13. The Close of the Eighteenth Century Improved: a Sermon... (Author, 1801)
