= Religious guild =

Medieval Catholic lay religious associations in Europe

Religious guilds
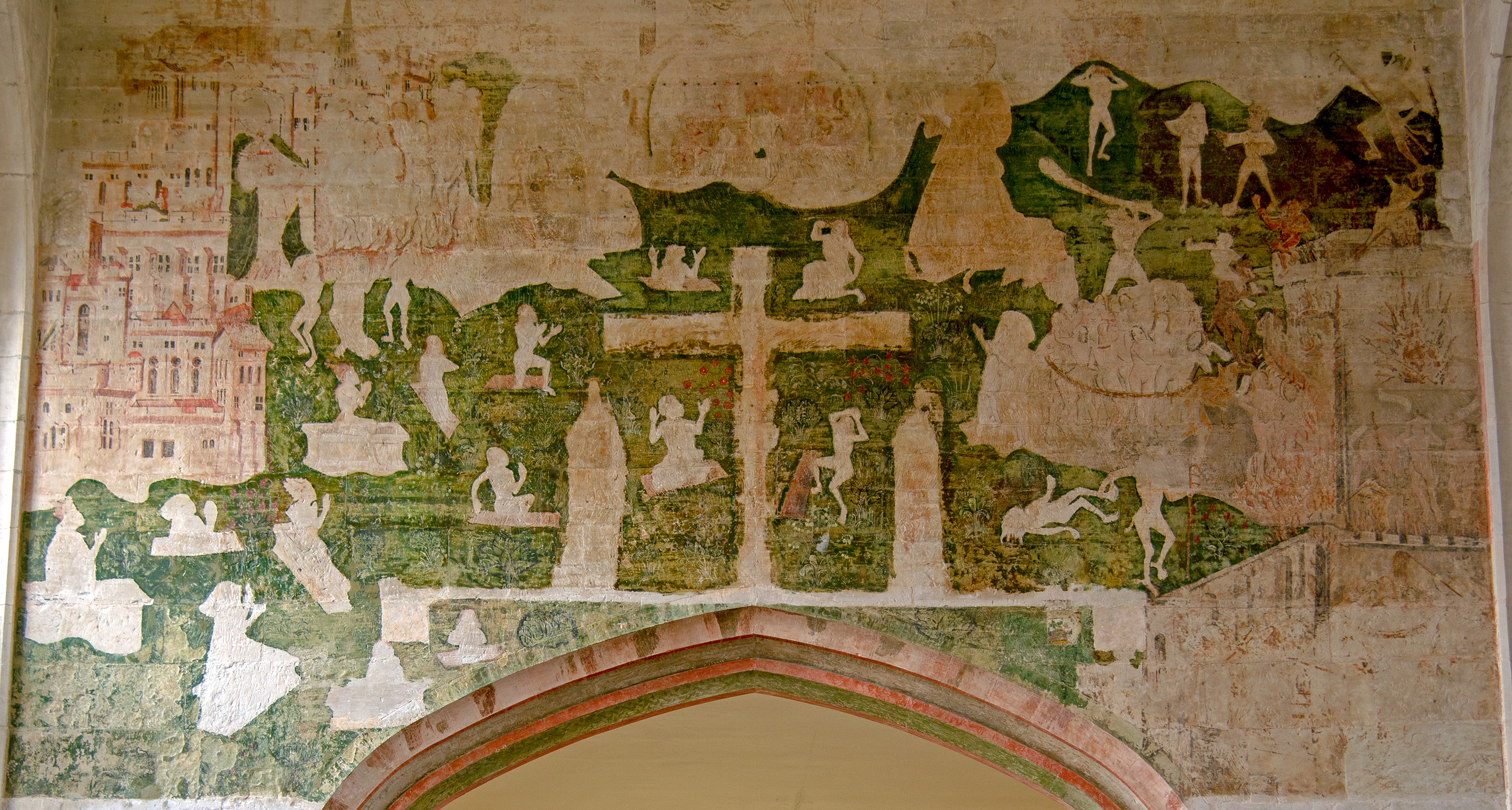
- Wall paintings in Stratford's Guild Chapel
- Predecessor: Frith guilds
- Successor: Friendly societies, craft guilds
- Formation: Middle Ages
- Dissolved: England: 1546–1548
- Type: Confraternity
- Purpose: Catholic devotion, charity, mutual aid, funerary services, praying for the dead
- Headquarters: Medieval Europe
- Region served: Europe (especially England, France, Italy)
- Members: Lay men and women
- Affiliations: Catholic Church, parish churches, monasteries

Religious guilds were voluntary associations formed in medieval Europe to promote collective devotional life, mutual support and charitable activity among their members.

== Origins ==
English religious guilds developed from earlier frith guilds of the early Middle Ages. By Æthelstan's early tenth century reign guild obligations had begun to acquire a distinct religious character, increasingly connecting them with the life of the parish church.

The oldest surviving charter of an English religious guild is from eleventh century, when King Cnut's Scandinavian thegn Orc presented a guildhall to the gyldschipe of Abbotsbury, with the members associated in almsgiving, caring for their sick, burial of the dead, and providing Masses for the souls of deceased members. There was also an annual feast.

== Organisation ==
Originating as lay organizations and almost always led by the laity, were an important part of the expanding patterns of lay participation in the devotional culture of the medieval Church. They were usually attached to parish churches, monasteries or specific saints' cults they acted as intermediaries between laypeople and ecclesiastical institutions. The distinction between religious guilds, fraternities, brotherhoods and confraternities was often blurred in practice and these associations did not follow a uniform institutional model and their distribution, structure and purposes varied across regions.

== Functions ==
These associations were often called guilds, particularly in England, but their purpose is primarily religious rather than social or economic. Religious observance was an important part of medieval guild life for merchant guilds and craft guilds as well as those of primarily a religious purpose, and many of the London craft guilds evolved from religious guilds.

The guilds combined spiritual obligations—such as funding altar candles, funding members' funerals and liturgical services as well as praying for dead members in purgatory, the centrality of which earned them the description "the poor man's chantry".

There could also be social functions in many guilds, including almsgiving Guilds often supported members in times of illness or hardship as well as supporting deceased members widows and orphans. These guilds were often central in providing mystery plays. There were other more unusual functions, with Birmingham's Guild of the Holy Cross providing a midwife to the inhabitants and the guilds of Wisbech maintaining sea banks and sluices.

== Guild activities and festivals ==
The guild often centered around patronal feast days where after a Mass for the deceased guild members there would be an annual meeting to elect officers and collect subscriptions and often followed by a feast. Members were often expected to try to settle disputes within the guild before going to court with members often expected to support each other against outsiders if there was a court case. There were often requirements that a member would bequeath a proportion of their wealth upon death. Most guild statutes forbade the admission of certain types of public sinner while also insisting on the expulsion of persistent sinners.

== Suppression and dissolution ==
The Dissolution of Colleges Act 1545 was in the last years of Henry VIII's reign as part of the English Reformation. It targeted guilds along with chantries, claiming they misapplied funds and misappropriated lands, and provided that their properties would thenceforth belong to the King for as long as he should live. In conjunction with the Dissolution of the Monasteries, the Act helped to finance the war with France.

Because Henry lived for only two years after the Act was passed, few guilds were closed or their property transferred to him. His young son and successor, King Edward VI, signed a new Dissolution of Colleges Act 1547, which along with royal decrees suppressed the guilds and seized their assets including guild chapels; it also instituted inquiries to determine all of their possessions.

There was a brief resumption of some of the suppressed guilds in Mary's reign and Catholic restoration in places like Basingstoke, although this was limited by the amount of guild property that had got into private hands.

== Examples ==
- The Cambridge Guild of Corpus Christi, which became Corpus Christi College, Cambridge
- The Guild of the Holy Trinity in Hull, which became Trinity House
- Guild of the Holy Cross (Stratford-upon-Avon)
- Guild of the Holy Cross (Birmingham)
- Saint Anne's Guild, Dublin
- United Guilds of Warwick

== Sources ==
- Armitage, Frederick (1918). The old guilds of England. Weare & Company.
- Barron, Caroline M. (1985). "The Parish Fraternities of Medieval London". In Barron, Caroline M.; Harper-Bill, C. (eds.). The Church in pre-Reformation society: essays in honour of F. R. H. Du Boulay. Woodbridge, Suffolk; Dover, New Hampshire, USA: Boydell Press. pp. 13–37. ISBN 9780851154213.
- Brentano, Lujo (1870). "Introduction". In Toulmin-Smith, Joshua (ed.). English Gilds; ordinances of over 100 English Gilds, with the usages of Winchester, Worcester, Bristol etc.
- Burton, E (1910). "Guilds". Catholic Encyclopedia. New York: Robert Appleton Company.
- MacCulloch, Diarmaid (2009). A History of Christianity: The First Three Thousand Years. London: Allen Lane. ISBN 978-0-7139-9869-6.
- Durfour, Ian (2021). "Gilds". Suffolk Guildhalls.
- Elton, Geoffrey (1960). The Tudor Constitution: Documents and Commentary. Cambridge University Press.
- Scarisbrick, Jack Joseph (1984). The Reformation and the English People. Oxford: Blackwell.
- Starr, Mark (1919). A worker looks at history: being outlines of industrial history specially written for Labour College-Plebs classes. Plebs League.
- Toulmin-Smith, Joshua (1870). English Gilds; ordinances of over 100 English Gilds, with the usages of Winchester, Worcester, Bristol etc.
- Westlake, Herbert Francis (1919). The Parish Gilds of Mediæval England. London; New York: Society for Promoting Christian Knowledge; Macmillan Company.
