= Frithstool =

Seat, chair, or place of peace

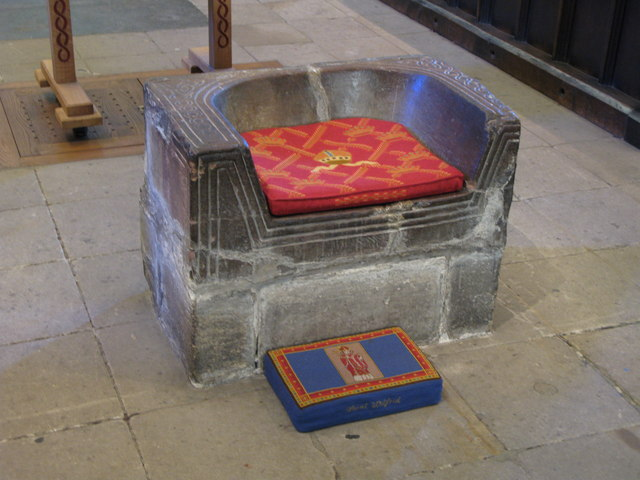
The Frith Stool at Hexham Abbey.

Among ancient English writers, a frithstool, frith stool or fridstool signified a seat, chair, or place of peace, in reference to the Anglo-Saxon concept of frith.

The most famous surviving examples are in Beverley Minster, St Mary's Church Sprotbrough, and Hexham Abbey. That in Beverley has the inscription Haec sedes lapidea Freedstoll dicitur, i.e. Pacis Cathedra, ad quam reus fugiendo perveniens, omnimodam habet securitatem. The English translation states that This stone seat is called the Freedstoll, i.e. the Chair of Peace, to which a criminal, arriving by flight, has complete security

Also, fridstoll or frithstow, Old English frithstól, frythstól, freedstool, fridstool, meaning (a). Old English only, A place of safety; a refuge; (b). A seat, usually of stone, formerly placed near the altar in some churches, which afforded inviolable protection to those who sought privilege of sanctuary.

The term also signified a palace, which was usually a privileged place.

== See also ==
- frith
- grith
- Cities of Refuge
- right of asylum
- sanctuary
- sanctuary city
