= Peter Greenhill =

Manx politician

Peter Greenhill is a member of the Legislative Council of the Isle of Man, having been elected on 12 March 2020.
