= Trade and crafts code of Germany =

Craft Trade Regulation Law

In the Federal Republic of Germany, craft trades are governed by the 'Crafts and Trade Code (German: Handwerksordnung or HwO or HandwO). This administrative law covers the commercial practice of handicraft; vocational education and training in the craft sector; and the self-administration of this economic sector. This law is a special trade regulation, and its provisions on vocational training form a special law within the Vocational Training Act.
