= Target Two Point Zero =

Target Two Point Zero was an interest rate challenge for students in the UK set by the Bank of England and The Times. Students aged 16 to 18 were asked to analyse the economic outlook and recommend what interest rate should be set. The students made a 15-minute presentation and were judged by Bank of England staff, through three rounds with an ultimate winner being selected in a national final. The Bank of England announced that 2017 was the last year of the competition.

== The challenge ==
Target Two Point Zero invited students aged 16 to 18 to take on the role of the Monetary Policy Committee to analyse current economic conditions in the UK and the outlook for inflation. Teams of four students created a formal presentation that was delivered to a panel of judges from the Bank of England. The presentations were concluded with a recommendation on exactly what interest rate the team would set in order to achieve the UK government's inflation target of 2.0% CPI.

Following the initial presentation, which lasted a maximum of 15 minutes, the judges had the opportunity to ask questions about what had been said. They might have asked the students to justify or clarify certain aspects of their interpretation of the economic conditions.

== Structure of the competition ==
The challenge had three identical rounds: regional heats, area finals and the national final. There was a sufficient time lapse between rounds to compel teams to change and update their presentation to take into account of new economic statistics, or the MPC’s own interest rate decisions.

== Winners of the competition ==
No.	Year	Winning school	Runner(s) Up	Other Finalists
1	2001	Harry Carlton Comprehensive School, Loughborough	The Perse School, Cambridge	Wimbledon High School, Wimbledon; Queen Elizabeth's Grammar School; St Patrick's Grammar School; Torquay Boys' Grammar School
2	2002	Blackpool Sixth Form College	The Perse School, Cambridge	Wolverhampton Girls' High School, Wolverhampton; Eton College, Windsor; Highgate School, London; Nottingham High School for Girls, Nottingham
3	2003	St Paul's School, Barnes	Eton College, Windsor	The Perse School, Cambridge; Churston Ferrers Grammar School, Brixham; The Beauchamp College, Leicester; The Blackpool Sixth Form College, Blackpool
4	2004	Highgate School, London	The Grange School, Northwich	Torquay Boys' Grammar School & Torquay Grammar School for Girls; Brighton College John Leggott Sixth Form College, Scunthorpe; The Perse School, Cambridge
5	2005	Cranbrook School	The Cheltenham Ladies’ College, Gloucestershire	Highgate School, London; Royal Grammar School, Newcastle upon Tyne; Wirral Grammar School for Boys, Merseyside; Verulam School, St Albans
6	2006	Tonbridge School	Haberdashers’ Aske’s School for Boys, Elstree, Hertfordshire	Nottingham High School for Girls; Leeds Grammar School; The Blackpool Sixth Form College; Wilson’s School, Wallington
7	2007	Leeds Grammar School	Haberdashers' Aske's School for Boys, Elstree, Hertfordshire	Royal Grammar School, Newcastle-upon-Tyne; Peter Symonds' College, Winchester; Wilson's School, Wallington, Surrey; Bablake School, Coventry
8	2008	The Tiffin Girls' School, Kingston-upon-Thames, Surrey	Loreto College, Coleraine, County Londonderry	Leeds Grammar School; Peter Symonds College, Winchester; Tonbridge School, Kent; Wolverhampton Girls' High School
9	2009	Peter Symonds College, Winchester	Nottingham High School	George Watson’s College, Edinburgh; Haberdashers’ Aske’s Boys’ School, Elstree; Ilford County High School; King Edward VI Grammar School, Stratford-uponAvon
10	2010	Dulwich College	Royal Grammar School, Newcastle upon Tyne	North London Collegiate School, Edgware; King Edward's School, Birmingham; The Blue Coat School, Liverpool; Peter Symonds College, Winchester
11	2011	The Sixth Form College Farnborough	Dame Allan's Schools, Newcastle Upon Tyne	Hutchesons' Grammar School, Glasgow; King Edward's School, Birmingham; Stamford Endowed Schools; Merchant Taylors' School, London
12	2012	St Paul’s School, Barnes	The Grammar School at Leeds	Queen Mary’s Grammar School, Walsall; Brighton College; Haberdashers’ Aske’s Boys’ School, Elstree; Merchiston Castle School, Edinburgh
13	2013	The Grammar School at Leeds	St Paul’s School, Barnes; Tonbridge School	King Edward VI School, Southampton; Millfield School, Street; Robert Gordon’s College, Aberdeen
14	2014	Oundle School	Bishop Wordsworth’s School, Salisbury	Ilford County High School; Central Newcastle High School; The Grammar School at Leeds; Watford Grammar School for Girls
15	2015	The Perse School, Cambridge	Queen Elizabeth’s School, Barnet; Wolverhampton Girls’ High School	Pate’s Grammar School, Cheltenham; University College School, Hampstead; Stewart’s Melville College, Edinburgh
16	2016	Pate’s Grammar School, Cheltenham	Loreto College, Coleraine	Saffron Walden County High School; Magdalen College School, Oxford; The Tiffin Girls’ School, Kingston-upon-Thames; Kesteven & Grantham Girls’ School

== See also ==
- Monetary Policy
