= John Gough Nichols =

English painter and antiquary

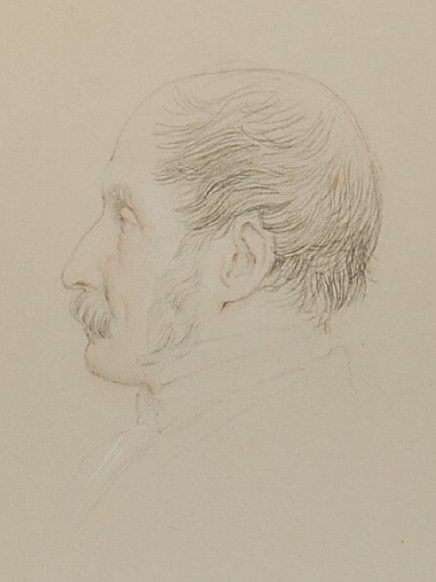
- Drawing of Nichols, by Leonard Charles Wyon, 1868
- Born: 22 May 1806; London, England
- Died: 14 November 1873 (aged 67); Surrey, England

John Gough Nichols (1806–1873) was an English painter and antiquary, the third generation in a family publishing business with strong connection to learned antiquarianism.

== Early life ==
The eldest son of John Bowyer Nichols, he was born at his father's house in Red Lion Passage, Fleet Street, London, on 22 May 1806. Richard Gough was his godfather. He went to a school kept by a Miss Roper at Islington, where, in 1811, Benjamin Disraeli, his senior by eighteen months, was a schoolfellow. From 1814 to 1816 he was educated by Thomas Waite at Lewisham grammar school, and in January 1817 he was placed at Merchant Taylors' School.

== Career ==
In 1824 Nichols left school for the counting-house in the printing offices of his father and grandfather. In 1830 he visited Robert Surtees in Durham, and made a Scottish tour. On the foundation of the Surtees Society in 1834 he was elected one of the treasurers. In 1835 he became a fellow of the Society of Antiquaries of London, and was later its printer. The following year he was chosen a member of the committee of the Royal Literary Fund. He was one of the founders of the Camden Society (1838), and edited many of its publications; in 1862 he printed a Descriptive Catalogue of the 86 volumes then issued.

In 1841 Nichols made an antiquarian tour on the continent. He was an original member of the Archæological Institute (1844).

=== Works ===
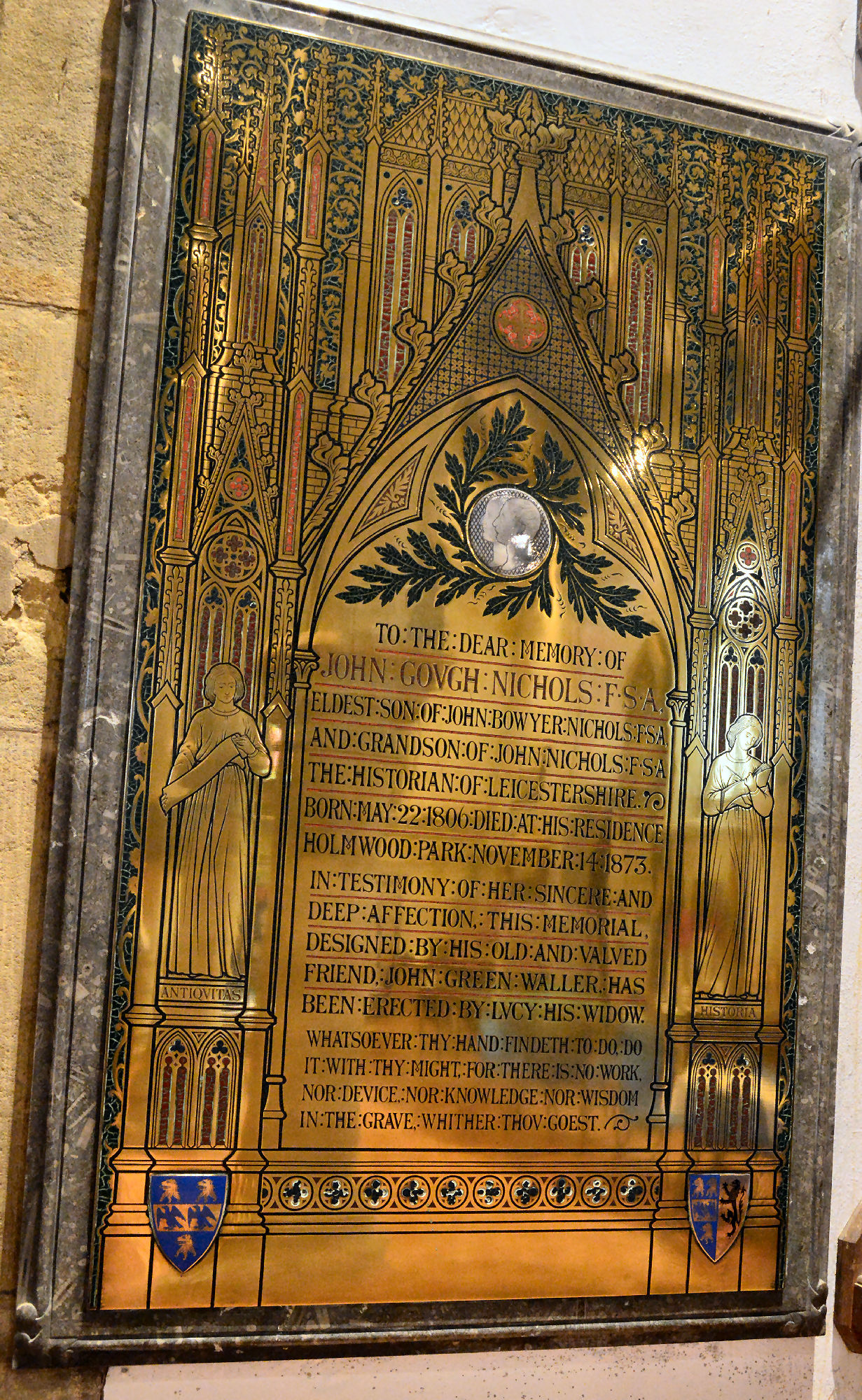
Brass to John Gough Nichols FSA

Nichols at an early age kept antiquarian journals and copied inscriptions and epitaphs. He went with his father to the meetings of the Royal Society and Society of Antiquaries, and corresponded with Isaac D'Israeli. His first literary work was on the Progresses of James I of his grandfather John Nichols, which he completed in 1828.

Nichols superintended a new edition of John Hutchins's History of Dorset, undertaken by William Shipp in 1860. In 1870 he undertook to edit a new edition of Thomas Dunham Whitaker's Whalley, of which the first volume appeared in 1871.

His works included:

- Autographs of Royal, Noble, Learned, and Remarkable Personages conspicuous in English History from Richard II to Charles II, accompanied by Memoirs, London, 1829.
- London Pageants: (1) Accounts of Sixty Royal Processions and Entertainments in the City of London; (2) Bibliographical List of Lord Mayors' Pageants, London, 1831 (also 1837).
- Annals and Antiquities of Lacock Abbey, Wilts, London, 1835 (with William Lisle Bowles).
- The Hundred of Alderbury, London, 1837, with Colt Hoare; part of Modern History of South Wiltshire, vol. v.
- Description of the Church of St. Mary, Warwick, and of the Beauchamp Chapel, London [1838], (seven plates; an abridgment was also published).
- Ancient Paintings in Fresco discovered in 1804 on the Walls of the Chapel of the Trinity at Stratford-upon-Avon, from drawings by Thomas Fisher, London, 1838.
- Notices of Sir Rich. Lestrange (in William John Thoms's Anecdotes, Camden Soc., No. 5, 1839).
- The Unton Inventories relating to Wadley and Faringdon, Berks, 1596–1620, London, Berkshire Ashmolean Soc. 1841.
- The Fishmongers' Pageant on Lord Mayor's Day, 1616; "Chrysanaleia," by Anthony Munday, twelve plates by Henry Shaw, London, 1844; 2nd edit. 1869.
- Examples of Decorative Tiles sometimes called Encaustic, engraved in facsimile, London, 1845.
- The Chronicle of Calais in the Reigns of Henry VII and Henry VIII to the Year 1540, London, 1846 (Camden Soc. No. 35).
- Camden Miscellany, London, 1847–75 (contributions to vols. i.–iv. and vii.)
- The Diary of Henry Machyn, 1550–63, London, 1848 (Camden. Soc. No. 42).
- Pilgrimages to St. Mary of Walsingham and St. Thomas of Canterbury, by Des. Erasmus, newly translated, London, 1849; 2nd edit. 1875.
- Description of the Armorial Window on the Staircase at Beaumanor, co. Leicester, London, privately printed [1849].
- The Literary Remains of John Stockdale Hardy, F.S.A., London, 1852.
- The Chronicle of Queen Jane and of Two Years of Q. Mary, London, 1852 (Camden Soc. No. 48).
- Chronicle of the Grey Friars of London, London, 1852 (Camden Soc. No. 53).
- Grants, &c., from the Crown during the Reign of Edward V, London, 1854, (Camden Soc. No. 60).
- Literary Remains of Edward VI, with Notes and Memoir, London, 1857–8, 2 vols. (Roxburghe Club).
- Narratives of the Days of the Reformation chiefly from the MSS. of John Foxe, London, 1859 (Camden Soc. No. 77).
- Catalogue of Portraits of Edward VI, London, 1859.
- The Armorial Windows erected in the Reign of Henry VI by John, Viscount Beaumont, and Katharine, Duchess of Norfolk, in Woodhouse Chapel, by the Park of Beaumanor, 1859 (privately printed).
- The Boke of Noblesse addressed to Edward IV, 1475, with Introduction, London, 1860 (Roxburghe Club).
- Notices of the Company of Stationers, London, 1861.
- A Descriptive Catalogue of the Works of the Camden Society, London, 1862; 2nd edit. 1872.
- The Family Alliances of Denmark and Great Britain, London, 1863.
- Wills from Doctors' Commons, 1495–1695, London, 1863 (with John Bruce; Camden Soc. No. 83).
- The Heralds' Visitations of the Counties of England and Wales, London, 1864.
- History from Marble, compiled in the reign of Charles II by Thomas Dingley, London, 1867–8, 2 vols. (Camden Soc. Nos. 94 and 97).
- History of the Parish of Whalley and Honor of Clitheroe in the Counties of Lancaster and York, by T. D. Whitaker, 4th ed. revised, London, 1870–6, 2 vols. (2nd vol. posthumous).
- Bibliographical and Critical Account of Watson's Memoirs, London, 1871.
- The Legend of Sir Nicholas Throckmorton, London, 1874 (Roxburghe Club).
- Autobiography of Anne, Lady Halkett, London, 1875 (Camden Soc. new. ser. No. 13).

Nichols contributed articles to the Archæologia of the Society of Antiquaries, 1831–73, vols. xxiii–xliv.; the Journal of the Archæological Institute, 1845–51; the Transactions of the London and Middlesex Archæological Association, vols. i–iv.; and the Collections of the Surrey Archæological Society, vols. iii. and vi. He edited: The Gentleman's Magazine, new ser. 1851–6, vols. xxxvi–xlv.; Collectanea Topographica et Genealogica, 1834–43, 8 vols.; The Topographer and Genealogist, 1846–58, 3 vols.; The Herald and Genealogist, 1863–74, 8 vols. In the Gentleman's Magazine, besides contributing essays, he compiled the obituary notices. In 1856 ill-health compelled him to resign its editorship, and it was transferred to John Henry Parker for a nominal consideration. A replacement was the Herald and Genealogist, of which the first volume appeared under his editorship in 1862. His interest in obituary-writing led him to found the short-lived Register and Magazine of Biography in 1869.

== Personal life ==
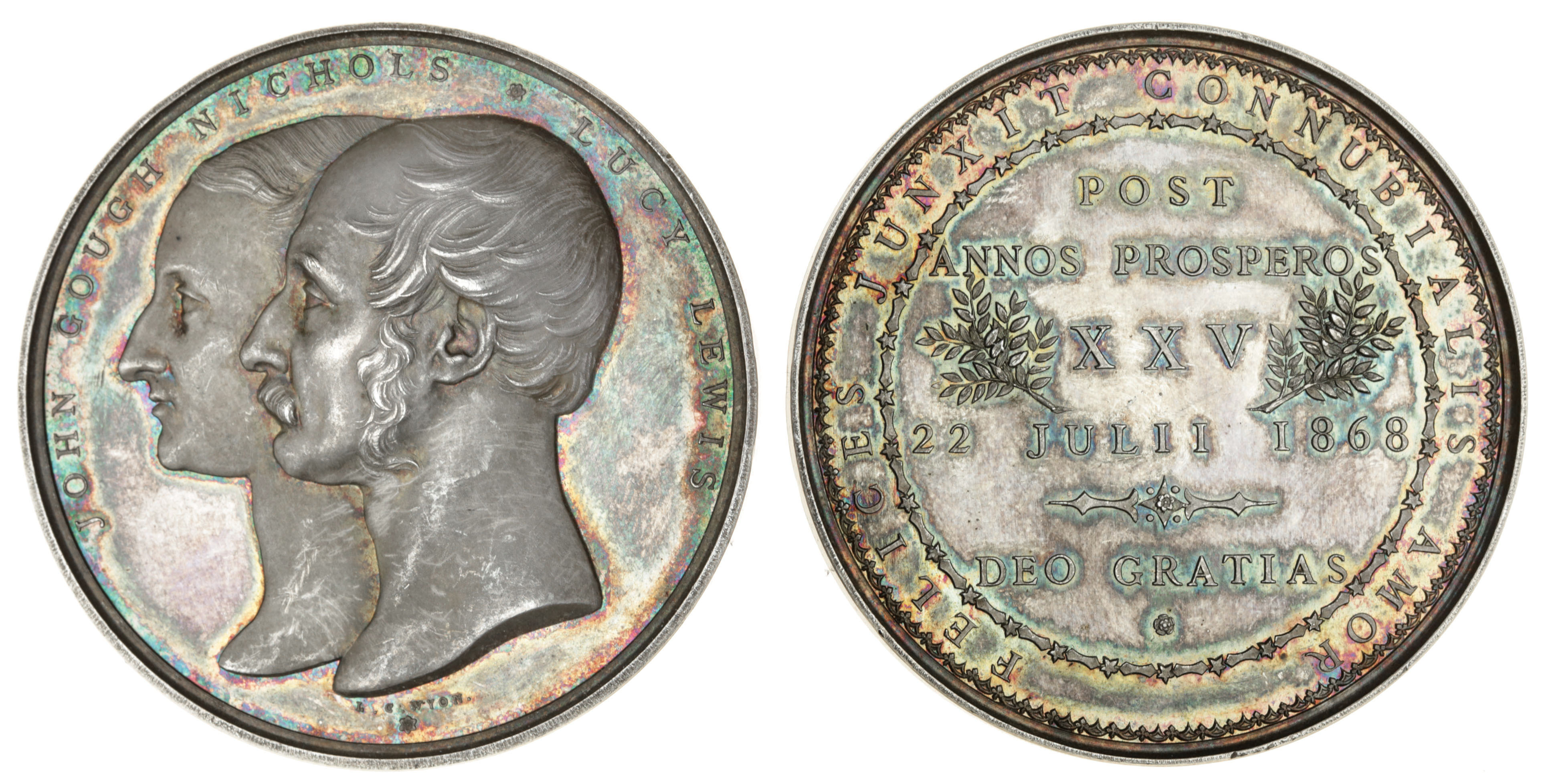
Lucy and John Gough Nichols, Silver Medal, struck for their 25th Wedding Anniversary, 1868, by L C Wyon. Courtesy Spink and Son Ltd.

On 22 July 1843 Nichols married Lucy Lewis, eldest daughter of Frederick Lewis, commander R.N., and had one son, John Bruce Nichols (born 1848), and two daughters. The son's name was added in 1873 to those of his father and uncle as printers of the Votes and Proceedings of the House of Commons. A portrait of Nichols at the age of twenty-four is contained in a family group in water-colours, by Daniel Maclise (1830). A medallion, representing him and his wife, by Leonard Charles Wyon, was struck in commemoration of their silver wedding in 1868.

Nichols died at his house, Holmwood Park, North Holmwood near Dorking, Surrey, after a short illness, on 14 November 1873, aged 67.

== Notes ==
Attribution

This article incorporates text from a publication now in the public domain: Lee, Sidney, ed. (1895). "Nichols, John Gough". Dictionary of National Biography. Vol. 41. London: Smith, Elder & Co.

Professional and academic associations
Preceded by Robert Henry Allan	Treasurer of the Surtees Society; 1834–73	Succeeded by William Greenwell
