= Guild of the Holy Cross (Birmingham) =

Medieval religious guild

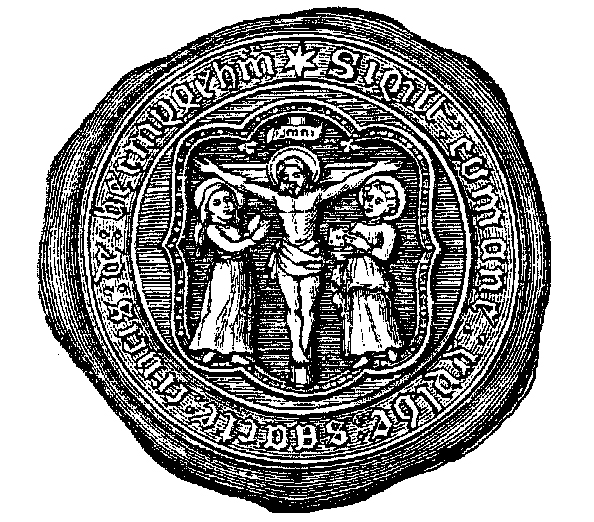
The seal of the Guild of the Holy Cross

The Guild or Gild of the Holy Cross was a medieval religious guild in Birmingham, England. It was founded in 1392 by three burgesses of the town – John Coleshill, John Goldsmith and William atte Slowe – in place of an attempt to found a chantry in the parish church of St Martin in the Bull Ring, that had been licensed ten years earlier but never came into effect.

The Guild had several roles within the town. The majority of its income was spent maintaining priests and a chantry at St Martin's, but it also maintained almshouses, roads and the bridge over the River Rea at Deritend. Its hall on New Street provided a social focus for the town, with feasting and the provision of a clock, chimes and a bell turret It had a number of paid officials including a warden, a clerk, an organist, a keeper of the hall and gardens, a midwife and a bellman – one of whose jobs was to announce when the spit ceased to turn at feasts. These officials had a high degree of status within the town: a list of twenty nine leading men of Birmingham in 1482 placed the Master of the Guild above the High Bailiff of the borough.

The Guild survived the investigations of the commissioners established by Henry VIII in 1545 to examine the religious endowments that remained after the dissolution of the monasteries, but was suppressed along with its associated chantries under Edward VI in 1547. Property worth £21 per year was retained to fund the Grammar School (now King Edward's School) which was established in the Guild's former hall on New Street.

== See also ==
- Guild of the Holy Cross (Stratford-upon-Avon) - similar institution in nearby Stratford-upon-Avon

== Bibliography ==
- Gill, Conrad (1952), Manor and borough to 1865, History of Birmingham, vol. 1, London: Oxford University Press
- Holt, Richard (1986), The early history of the town of Birmingham, 1166-1600, Dugdale Society Occasional papers, vol. 30, Oxford: Printed for the Dugdale Society by D. Stanford, Printer to the University, ISBN 0-85220-062-5
- Elrington, C. R. (1964), "Churches Built before 1800", in Stephens, W.B. (ed.), The City of Birmingham, The Victoria History Of The County Of Warwick, vol. VII, Oxford: Oxford University Press, pp. 361–379
