= King Edward VI School, Stratford-upon-Avon =

King Edward VI School
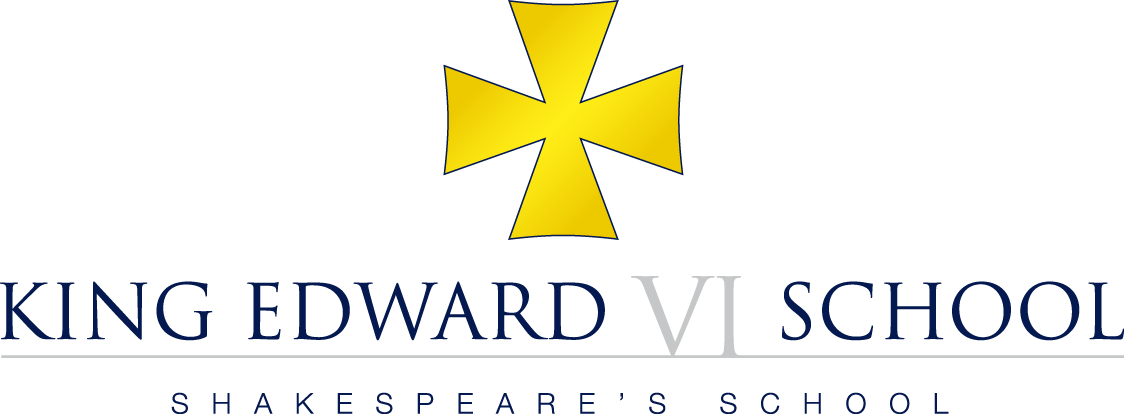

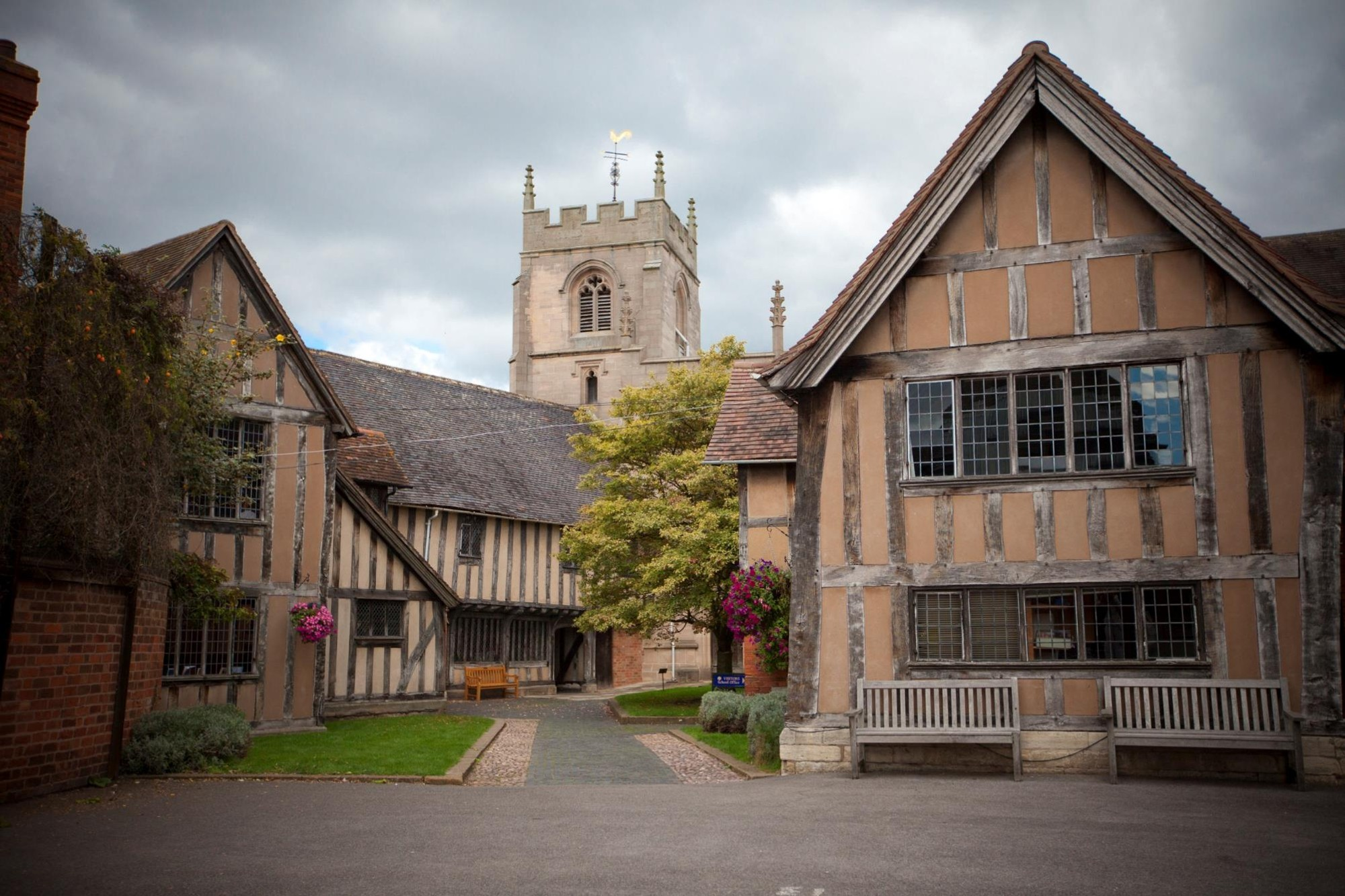
- King Edward VI School, Stratford-upon-Avon

Location
- Chapel Lane; Stratford-upon-Avon, Warwickshire, CV37 6BE; England; 52.19°N 1.7075°W

Information
- Type: Grammar school, Academy
- Motto: Shakespeare's School
- Established: 13th century 1553 (Re-founded by King Edward VI)
- Founder: King Edward VI
- Department for Education URN: 137302 Tables
- Ofsted: Reports
- Chair of Governors: Victor Matts
- Headmaster: Bennet Carr
- Gender: Boys (Years 7-11); Coeducational (Years 12-13)
- Age: 11 to 18
- Enrolment: 872
- Houses: Warneford, Dyson, Spender, Fitzmaurice
- Colours: Navy and gold
- Alumni: Old Edwardians
- Website: http://www.kes.net/

The Grammar School of King Edward VI at Stratford-upon-Avon (known as King Edward VI School or shortened locally to K.E.S.) is a grammar school in Stratford-upon-Avon, Warwickshire, England. It was originally for boys only but since September 2013 has admitted girls into the Sixth Form. William Shakespeare may have attended the school, leading to K.E.S. widely being known as "Shakespeare's School". It is a former voluntary aided school and became an academy on 17 August 2011.

== History ==
There has been an educational facility at the current site of the school since at least the early thirteenth century - established by the Guild of the Holy Cross. The School can trace its origins to May 1295, when in the Register of Deacons of the Diocese of Worcester there is the record of the ordination of Richard as rector scholarum, to teach the basics of learning the alphabet, psalters, and religious rites to boys. A schoolroom, schoolhouse and payment of £20 per annum for a master was one of the provisions of King Edward VI's charter which established Stratford-upon-Avon as a borough in June, 1553. The school was re-founded as one of King Edward's schools nine days before the young king died of tuberculosis and is the last of the King Edward VI Schools. A history of the early years of the school has been published by the former chairman of the governors Levi Fox.

Playwright and poet William Shakespeare may have attended the school between the ages of seven and fourteen. His father, John Shakespeare, a glover and wool dealer in the town, held the office of bailiff (Mayor) of the borough in 1568. As a child, William would have been entitled to a free place at the school, Classmates may have included Richard Field, Robert Dibdale, and Thomas Green.

== Leadership ==
The school's Headmaster since September 2010 is Bennet Carr FRGS The Chairman of Governors is Victor Matts. The Captain of School, a position first appointed in 1893, is elected by the students of the Lower Sixth and members of staff.

== Recognition ==
In 2020, The Sunday Times named King Edward VI School State Secondary School of the Decade, citing sustained academic performance over a ten‑year period. The school has also been named State Secondary School of the Year (West Midlands) on multiple occasions and State Secondary School of the Year for Academic Excellence (West Midlands) in successive editions of The Sunday Times Parent Power guide. In an analysis published by The Sunday Times based on five years of Ofsted Parent View data, the school was identified as the joint‑happiest secondary schools in England, with 99% of parents agreeing that their child was happy at the school.

== Admissions ==
K.E.S. is a selective, single-sex school for boys. Prospective students take an 11-plus examination in September of Year 6 (ages 10 and 11) across Warwickshire. Places are awarded to those who achieve the Automatic Qualifying Score for this school. There is entry into the School at Sixth Form with places offered based on a ranking of applicants according to their best 8 GCSEs. Since 2013, female students have been admitted into the Sixth Form

== Student life ==
=== Clubs & Societies ===
Around 60 clubs operate each term, ranging from debating, astronomy, and chemistry to drama, table tennis, and jazz. The school has regular success in the Mock Magistrates and Mock Bar court trials, Young Enterprise and Bank of England Target Two Point Zero Challenge. The KES Esports team, called the Scorpions and formed in 2017, triumphed in tournaments run by Digital Schoolhouse (DSH) and the British Esports Association (BEA). In 2019, the team won the National Esports Tournament in Overwatch, beating 3,500 secondary schools, followed by the BEA's Open National Tournament held at Insomnia.

=== Sport ===
Rugby has seen national success in the Daily Mail Cup (Winners 1991, Semi Finalists in 1996, Quarter Finalists on two occasions, Vase Semi Finalists in 2009 and Bowl Semi Finalists in 2025) and goes on regular international tours, most recently to Japan in 2024. Students take part in fencing, athletics, rowing, hockey, basketball, badminton, table tennis, volleyball, netball and previously fives. Fencing is a sport at the school, with wins from pupils at several fencing tournaments.

=== Music and theatre ===
The band has played at the 100 Club, Oxford Street, London. The school puts on an annual play.

==== Edward's Boys ====
Established and run by former deputy head Perry Mills, this theatre group developed out of the school's involvement with Michael Wood’s documentary series In Search of Shakespeare. In 2014 they were awarded an Owle Schreame Award for their production of his Galatea, and have since performed twice in the Sam Wanamaker Playhouse, London, as well as Lady Margaret Hall, Oxford, Christ Church, Oxford, and the Swan Theatre, Stratford-upon-Avon. The company recently toured to Montpellier, France, where they performed at L'Assomption School, the 'Maison des Choeurs', and 'SortieOuest'.

=== Houses ===
In 1921, the headmaster, the Revd. A. Cecil Knight, established six houses to promote healthy competition amongst the boys. This number was reduced to four houses in 1924: Shakespeare, Flower (after Charles Flower, a benefactor of the school in the 1890s), Warneford, and De La Warr (Earl Delawarr was High Steward of Stratford in the 1850s). The house system was altered in 1973 and just two houses established – King's (blue) and Guild (gold) – in recognition of the historic benefactors of the school.

In 2000 four houses were re-introduced. These were named after individuals associated with the twentieth-century school who had made significant contributions in their respective fields. The houses are: Dyson (Red colours), Fitzmaurice (Blue), Spender (Purple) and Warneford (Green). Denis Dyson was a physics and astronomy master who came to the school in 1926, initially for six-months, and then he stayed until his retirement at the age of 71 in 1975. He continued to assist the school well into his nineties. Robert Fitzmaurice was an Old Edwardian who entered the school in 1905. He was injured in the First World War but went on to a successful career as a civil engineer. Richard Spender was an old boy and poet who was killed assaulting German machine-gun positions in 1943. Reginald Warneford was an old boy who was the first naval airman to receive the Victoria Cross. He was killed in a flying accident in 1915.

== Buildings ==
There are a variety of architectural styles on the site ranging from the fifteenth-century Guildhall to the Richard Spender Building opened in 2017. The majority of the historic parts of the school are still used. The ground-floor of the Guildhall, where the town council of Shakespeare's time met and where travelling players performed - the holes for the rods to hold the temporary stage are still visible - was used as a library until February 2013. Having undergone restoration work, it is now open to the general public from 11am onwards each day. On the first floor,"Big School", is the room in which William Shakespeare was taught.

The building known as Pedagogue's House across the courtyard houses the Headmaster's Study and the offices of senior staff. Pedagogue's House, first built in 1427 and believed to be the oldest half-timbered schoolroom in England, is attached to the Old Vicarage where the Headmaster lives. Adjacent to the Guildhall is the Guild Chapel, founded by the medieval Guild of the Holy Cross and now owned by the Stratford-upon-Avon Town Trust. Today it is used weekly by the school for morning services, choir rehearsals, organ lessons and various school events, such as the annual Nine Lessons & Carols and Remembrance Services.

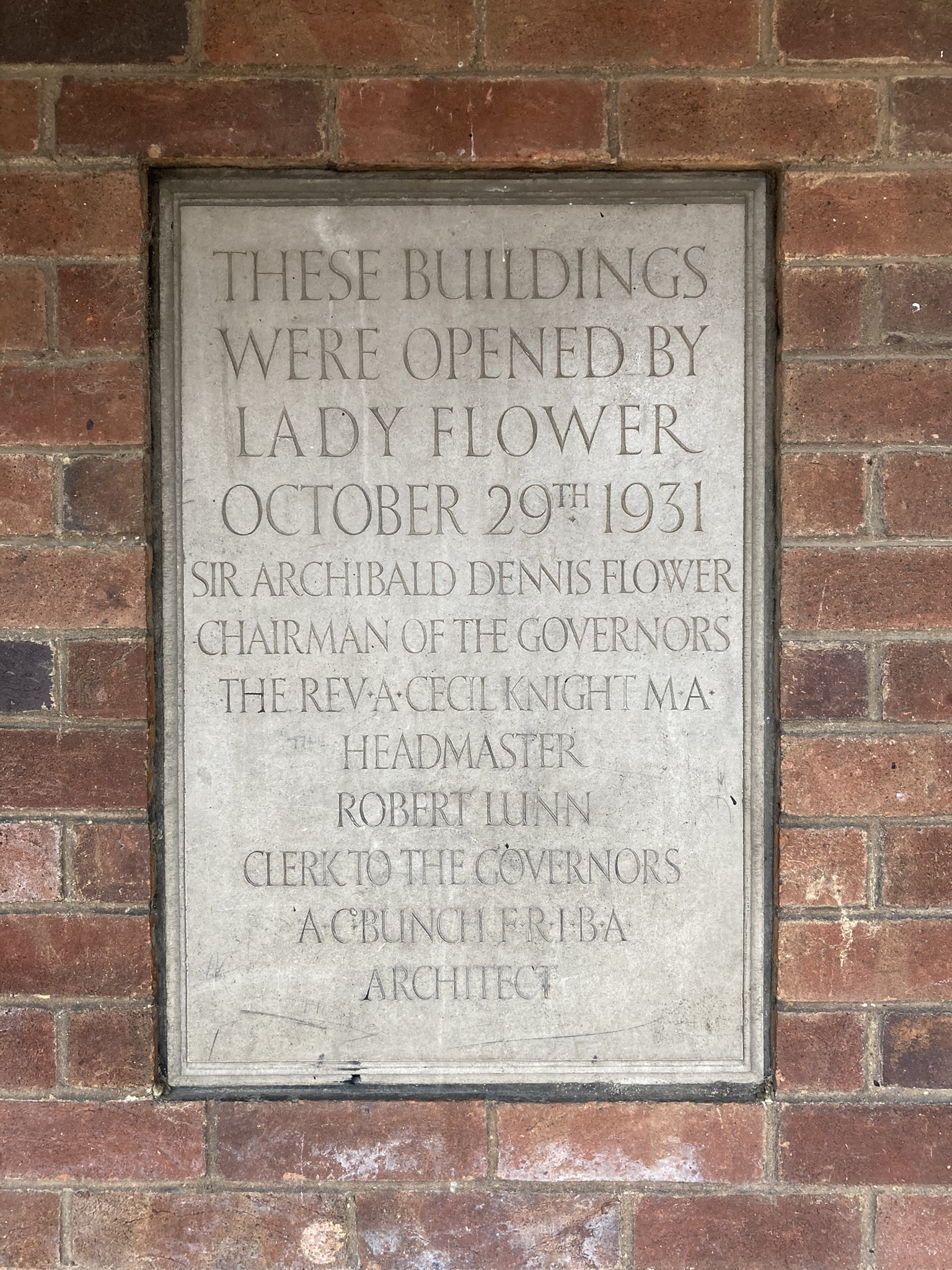
A stone plaque detailing the opening of 1930s classrooms in the school's quad

One wing of the school’s current Quad, containing the Mathematics Department, dates from the 1930s. The Quad was established in the 1960s and 1970s by Stratford architect Robert (Bob) Harvey. The departments of Biology and Chemistry are housed in the Denis Dyson Building (built in 2008) and contains 6 science labs. There are another two Physics laboratories in the Fitzmaurice Building, above the Design Technology and Art Departments. The most recent part of the school, built in 2017, is the Richard Spender Building, a three-storey block which houses the English Department, computing suites, and the school library named after Old Edwardian Tim Pigott-Smith. The Levi Fox Hall, named after a former Chairman of the Governors, is primarily used for sport, assemblies, school plays, concerts and examinations. The Royal Shakespeare Company has used the space for a production of Julius Caesar.

== Notable alumni ==
=== Born before 1900 ===
- John de Stratford (died 1348): Archbishop of Canterbury and Treasurer and Chancellor of England. Brother of Robert.
- Robert de Stratford (died 9 April 1362): an English bishop, and was one of Edward III of England's principal ministers. Brother of John.
- Robert Dibdale (1556-1586) possibly a pupil at the same time as William Shakespeare. Catholic Priest and martyr, martyred at Tyburn on 8 October 1586. Was declared Blessed by John Paul II on 22 November 1987.
- Richard Field (or Feild) (1561–1624): printer and publisher in Elizabethan London, known for his close association with the poems of William Shakespeare.
- William Shakespeare (1564–1616) was an English playwright, poet and actor. He is widely regarded as the greatest writer in the English language and the world's pre-eminent dramatist.
- William Wyse (1860-1929) was a classical scholar, noted for his work on the Attic orator Isaeus, and a benefactor of the University of Cambridge.
- Ernest Parke (1860-1944) was a political writer, editor, newspaper proprietor and local politician.
- Reginald Alexander John Warneford (1891–1915): "Rex" Warnford was awarded the Victoria Cross in World War I as a Flight Sub-Lieutenant in the Royal Navy's 1 Squadron, RNAS for an action on 7 June 1915 at Ghent, Belgium. His Victoria Cross is displayed at the Fleet Air Arm Museum.
- Richard Nelson Gale: General Sir Richard Nelson "Windy" Gale GCB, KBE, DSO, MC (1896–1982) was a soldier in the British Army who served in both world wars. In World War I he was awarded the Military Cross in 1918. In World War II he commanded the 6th Airborne Division during the invasion of Normandy and Operation Tonga in 1944.

=== Born after 1900 ===
- Herbert Hallowes (1912–1987) was a flying ace of the Royal Air Force credited with multiple aerial victories while serving during the Second World War.
- Alex Henshaw (1912–2007): air-racing pilot in the 1930s and setter of long-distance flight records. During World War II he was chief production test pilot for the Supermarine Spitfire at the Vickers-Armstrongs plant at Castle Bromwich.
- Richard Spender (1921-1943), also known as Dicky Spender, was a British poet and officer in the British Army during WWII. The Daily Telegraph described him as the Rupert Brooke of the Second World War
- Tom Pargetter (1932-) is a former English international rugby union player who represented England as a lock forward between 1962 and 1963.
- George Tremlett (1939-2021) was an English politician and biographer. He served as a Conservative member of the Greater London Council for Twickenham and was later known for his biographies of literary figures, including Dylan Thomas.
- Richard Tracey JP (1943–2020) Member of the London Assembly for Merton and Wandsworth from 2008 to 2016, former Conservative MP for Surbiton from 1983 to 1997 and Environment Minister and Under-Secretary of State for Sport
- Tim Pigott-Smith, OBE: (1946 - 2017) was a British film and television actor and author, who won the British Academy Television Award for Best Actor in 1985 for The Jewel in the Crown..
- Vice Admiral Steve Moorhouse CBE (born 1973) is a British naval officer who currently serves as Fleet Commander of the Royal Navy.
- Neil Codling (born 1973) is an English musician and songwriter best known as the keyboardist and rhythm guitarist for the band Suede, with whom he has recorded several chart‑topping albums.
- James Hayter (born 1978) is a former English rugby union player who played professionally as a hooker for Harlequins, Llanelli Scarlets, Coventry and Esher.
- James Cottriall (born 1986) English musician and singer‑songwriter, who rose to prominence in Austria after winning the talent competition The Voice in 2009.
- James Roe MBE PLY (born 1988) is a British rower who was part of the mixed coxed team that won gold at the London 2012 Summer Paralympics and at the World Rowing Championships in 2011.
- Esme Booth OLY (born 1998) British rower, Olympic silver medallist at Paris 2024, European Rowing Championships gold and silver medallist.
- George Hendy (born 2002) is an English professional rugby union player who plays for Premiership Rugby club Northampton Saints.

== See also ==
- List of the oldest schools in the United Kingdom
- Stratford School, in the London Borough of Newham, also previously known as Stratford Grammar School
