= Chronicle of the Grey Friars of London =

Account of sixteenth-century English history

The Greyfriars' Chronicle was a chronicle during the Tudor period. It was published in 1852 and was edited by J.G. Nichols. It documents political and religious events in and around London, England from the reign of Richard I to the reign of Mary I. Most of its content is sixteenth century.
