= Samuel Denne =

English cleric and antiquarian

Samuel Denne (1730–1799) was an English cleric and antiquarian.

== Life ==
The second of the two sons of Archdeacon John Denne, he was born at the deanery, Westminster, on 13 January 1730. He was educated at Streatham and King's School, Canterbury. Admitted to Corpus Christi College, Cambridge, 1748, he graduated B.A. 1753, and M.A. 1756. In 1754 he was presented to the vicarage of Lamberhurst in Kent, but he resigned it in 1767 on becoming vicar of Wilmington and also of Darenth, both near Dartford, Kent.

Denne became a fellow of the Society of Antiquaries of London in 1783. He died unmarried at Wilmington, on 3 August 1799, and was buried near his father in Rochester Cathedral.

== Works ==
Denne published:

- A Letter to Sir R. Ladbroke (advocacy of a separate system), 1771. His brother John was chaplain at Maidstone Gaol, and was shot by escaping prisoners.
- Historical Particulars of Lambeth Parish and Lambeth Palace, 1795.
- The History and Antiquities of Rochester and its Environs, with William Shrubsole, 1772; also 1817 and 1833.

He contributed to: John Thorpe's edition of Custumale Roffense; Richard Gough's Sepulchral Monuments; the Bibliotheca Topographica Britannica; the Illustrations of the Manners and Expences of Antient Times in England, 1797; and an edition of Francis Atterbury's Correspondence. He also assisted Henry Ellis in his history of Shoreditch, contributed articles to Archæologia, and wrote in the Gentleman's Magazine as "W. & D." (i.e. Wilmington and Darenth, his vicarages). His correspondence with Gough was published in vol. vi. of John Nichols's Literary Illustrations.

== Notes ==
Attribution

This article incorporates text from a publication now in the public domain: Stephen, Leslie, ed. (1888). "Denne, Samuel". Dictionary of National Biography. Vol. 16. London: Smith, Elder & Co.
