= Judicia civitatis Londoniae =

The Judicia civitatis Londoniae or Dooms of the City of London is a compilation of laws and customs from 930 granted by Æthelstan that governed the City of London. It tried to get the peace or frith guilds, associations with a corporate responsibility for the good conduct of their members and their mutual liability, to unite although the Knighten Guilde was not included. Also involving the bishops and reeves of London, guild law came to be the law of the City of London.

Guild members were expected to be involved in almsgiving, caring for their sick, burial of the dead, and providing Masses for the souls of deceased members. There was also a monthly feast. As well as the religious and social practices there were also commercial aspects including insurance against losses and assistance in catching thieves. This foreshadowed later English Gild Merchants.

== Bibliography ==
- Armitage, Frederick (1918). The old guilds of England. Weare & Company.
- Brentano, Lujo (1870). "Introduction". In Toulmin-Smith, Joshua (ed.). English Gilds; ordinances of over 100 English Gilds, with the usages of Winchester, Worcester, Bristol etc. Early English Text Society.
- Burton, Edwin; Marique, Pierre (1910). "Guilds" . In Herbermann, Charles (ed.). Catholic Encyclopedia. Vol. 7. New York: Robert Appleton Company.
- Feldman, David (March 1988). "The King's Peace, the Royal Prerogative and Public Order: The Roots and Early Development of Binding over Powers". The Cambridge Law Journal. 47 (1). Cambridge University Press: 101–128. JSTOR 4507130.
- Lambert, Joseph Malet (1891). Two Thousand Years of Gild Life. Hull.
- Payne, Katherine (2012). "Origin and Creation: London Guilds of the Twelfth Century" (PDF). Historia. 21 (1): 101–108.
