= William Shrubsole (minister) =

English nonconformist minister and author

William Shrubsole (1729–1797) was an English nonconformist minister and author.

== Life ==
Shrubsole was born at Sandwich, Kent, on 7 April 1729. In February 1743 he was apprenticed to George Cook, a shipwright at Sheerness, whose daughter he married in 1757. After reading a work of Isaac Ambrose, he grew religious, and in 1752 was asked to conduct the devotions of a small body which met at Sheerness on Sunday afternoons. In 1763 this congregation built a meeting-house, and Shrubsole frequently acted as their minister. About 1767 he undertook regular public preaching in Sheerness and other towns in Kent.

In 1773 Shrubsole was appointed master-mastmaker at Woolwich, but later in the year received promotion at Sheerness. In 1784 a new chapel was built for him at Sheerness, which was enlarged in 1787.

In 1793 Shrubsole had a paralytic stroke. Because of Shrubsole's infirmity, he and the Sheerness congregation agreed to appoint Charles Buck as his co-pastor. Shrubsole and Buck worked together harmoniously as "father and son".

Shrubsole declined further promotion in the dockyard, on the ground that it might interfere with his preaching engagements. He died at Sheerness on 7 February 1797. All the people in Sheerness experienced "a mighty movement of sorrow" when they learned of his death

== Works ==
Shrubsole is known as the author of Christian Memoirs (Rochester, 1776), an allegorical work in the style of John Bunyan, and written, as he wrote, to divert his mind after being bitten by a mad dog in 1773. A second edition (1790) contained an elegy written in 1771 on the death of George Whitefield; and a third edition (1807) was edited by his son, with a Life of the author. Other works included:

- The History and Antiquities of Rochester, 1772, with Samuel Denne.
- The Plain Christian Shepherd's Defence of his Flock, being 5 Letters in support of Infant Baptism, 1794;
- a pamphlet A Plea in favour of the Shipwrights belonging to the Royal Dockyard, 1770;

and pamphlets and letters on topical religious controversies.

== Family ==
His eldest son, William Shrubsole (1759–1829), born at Sheerness on 21 November 1759, became a shipwright in Sheerness dockyard, clerk to one of the officers, and clerk in the Bank of England. He was one of the first secretaries of the London Missionary Society, and contributed hymns to publications from 1775 to 1813; but is not connected with William Shrubsole the composer.

== Notes ==
Attribution

This article incorporates text from a publication now in the public domain: Lee, Sidney, ed. (1897). "Shrubsole, William (1729-1797)". Dictionary of National Biography. Vol. 52. London: Smith, Elder & Co.
