= Frith =

Word for peace

Frith is a word derived from Old English meaning "peace; protection; safety, security, freedom, refuge".

== Etymology ==
Derived from Old English friðu, friþ, it is cognate to Old Norse friðr, Old Saxon frithu, Old High German fridu, German Friede, Dutch vrede, West Frisian frede, Luxembourgish Fridden, Icelandic friður, Common Scandinavian fred (all with meanings similar to "peace" or "calm") and also root-cognate to friend.

In Swedish, two different words with different meanings have developed from this word, the words fred (state of no war) and frid (state of no disturbance) and also the expression that something is "fredat/fredad" more or less "peaced" denoting things that are not to be touched such as animals not to be hunted or flowers not to be picked. The English word became obsolete in the Middle English period, but survived into the 17th century in the compound frith-silver "feudal payment".

== Culture ==
In Anglo-Saxon and post-Anglo-Saxon culture, the term has a considerably broader scope and meaning. Frith has a great deal to do not only with the state of peace but also with the nature of social relationships conducive to peace. Moreover, it has strong associations with stability and security.

The word friþgeard, meaning "asylum, sanctuary" was used for sacrosanct areas. A friþgeard would then be any enclosed area given over to the worship of the gods. Seating oneself on a frith-stool was sometimes a requirement for claiming sanctuary in certain English churches.

Frith is also used in the context of fealty, as an expression of the relationship between a lord and his people. Frith is inextricably related to the state of kinship, which is perhaps the strongest indicator of frith. In this respect, the word can be coterminous with another significant Anglo-Saxon root-word, sib (from which the word 'sibling' is derived) - indeed the two are frequently interchanged. In this context, frith goes further than expressing blood ties, and encompasses all the concomitant benefits and duties which kinship engenders.

As early as the rule of Æthelstan in 930 AD, frith-guilds were responsible for maintaining the peace under law in England, particularly in London. Later, this concept expanded to a sort of mutual defence, such as in Berwick-upon-Tweed.

In the post-conquest poem Rime of King William, a deorfrið (literally animal-frith) referred to one of the royal forests set up by William the Conqueror, probably the New Forest. Stefan Jurasinski argued that frið here could have carried the legal notion of protection (Latin: pax).

== See also ==
- Frith-borh
- Fridstoll
- Grith
- Til árs ok friðar – Old Norse ritual formula for bringing frith
- Saint Frideswide or Frithuswith
