= Guild of the Holy Cross (Stratford-upon-Avon) =

Medieval religious guild (1269-1547) in the United Kingdom

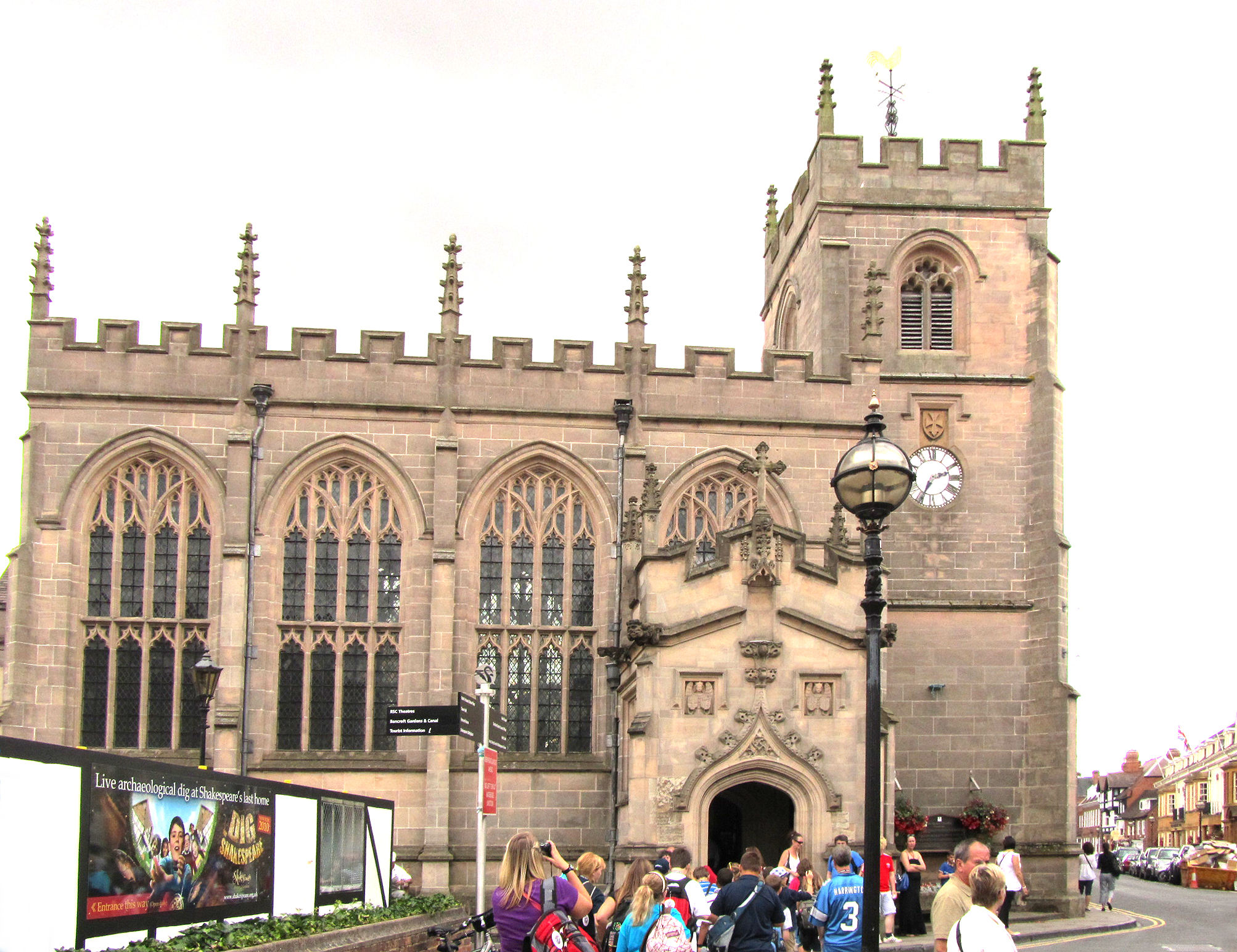
- The Guild Chapel, one of the guild's most important buildings
- Formation: 13th century
- Dissolved: 1547
- Type: Religious guild

The Guild of the Holy Cross was a medieval religious guild in Stratford-upon-Avon, which was created in the 13th century and abolished in 1547. Throughout the period of its existence, the guild was a central institution of Stratford's civic and cultural life, which catered for the town's spiritual needs and fulfilled a range of political and social functions. A number of historical buildings associated with the guild still survive today.

== History ==
In 1269, The Guild of the Holy Cross (which had existed for some time prior) received a license from Godfrey Giffard, Bishop of Worcester, to establish a hospital for the maintenance of needy priests of the diocese of Worcester, as well as a chapel, the Guild Chapel. Provisions laid out for the observance of the Augustinian rule in the hospital were quickly overshadowed by the activities of the guild. The guild was re-founded in 1403.

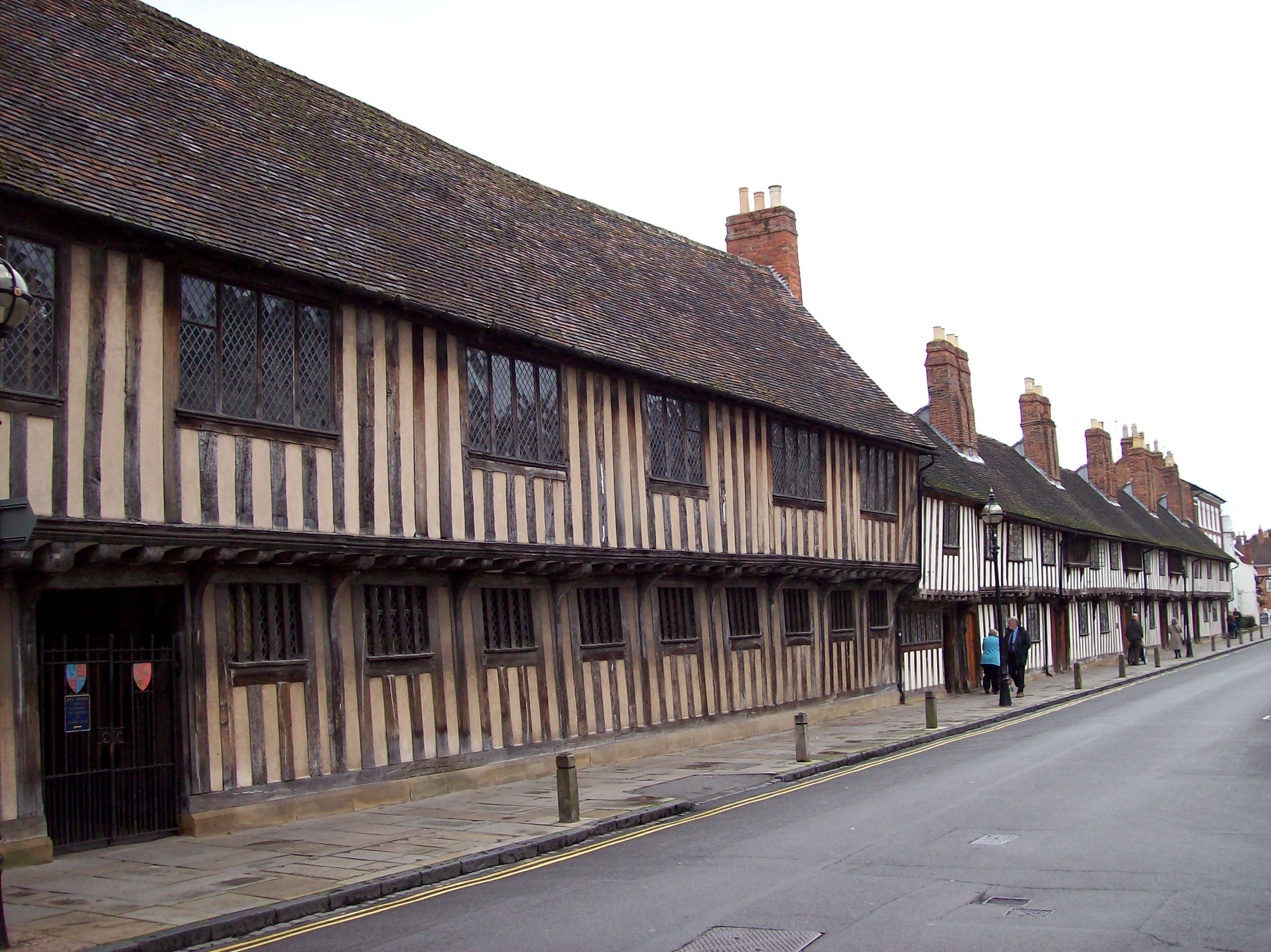
The guildhall and adjoining almshouses on Church Street

The guild attracted members from the local gentry as well as merchants and craftsmen from the town, and concerned itself with the welfare of its members. By the early 15th century the guild had come to own many properties in the town, and it used the rental income from these to provide a number of welfare facilities for its members: In around 1420, it constructed a guildhall and adjoining almshouses on Church Street. These buildings became the centre of Stratford's civic life, providing many social and political functions, including housing a grammar school.

The guild reached the peak of its influence in the late 15th century, when it had become the town's semi-official governing body, and probably included all of the more important townsmen.

In the early 16th century, membership of the Stratford guild declined as a wave of religious change and uncertainty swept across the country during the Tudor period. Under King Edward VI's suppression of religious guilds in 1547, the guild was abolished and its property confiscated.

In response, the inhabitants of Stratford petitioned the Crown for a charter of incorporation as a borough, which they received in 1553. The new Stratford Corporation acquired the guild's former property. The charter ensured the continuance both of the privileges which the inhabitants had enjoyed, and continuance of the functions which the guild had undertaken, including the payment of the vicar and schoolmaster and the maintenance of the almshouses. Under the terms of the charter, the town's grammar school was re-founded as the King Edward VI School.

== See also ==
- Guild of the Holy Cross (Birmingham) - similar institution in nearby Birmingham
