= Stratford-upon-Avon Town Hall =

Municipal building in Stratford-upon-Avon, Warwickshire, England

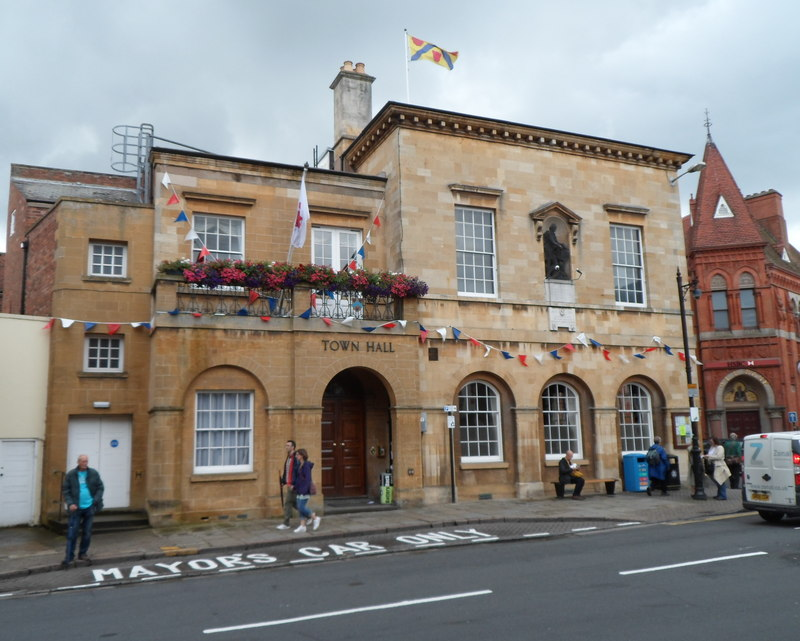
- Interactive map of Stratford-upon-Avon Town Hall
- 52.1915°N 1.7070°W
- Location: Stratford-upon-Avon, Warwickshire

History
- Built: 1767

Site notes
- Architect: Robert Newman
- Architectural style: Palladian style

Listed Building – Grade II*
- Official name: Town Hall
- Designated: 25 October 1951
- Reference no.: 1298545

Stratford-upon-Avon Town Hall is a municipal building in Sheep Street, Stratford-upon-Avon, Warwickshire. It is a Grade II* listed building.

== History ==
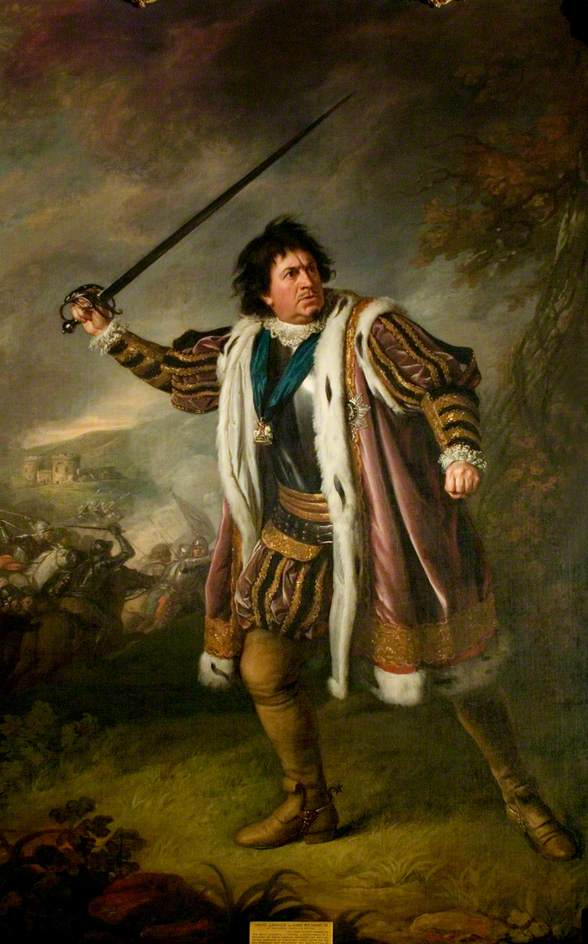
David Garrick as Richard III by Nathaniel Dance-Holland, 1771

The previous building on the site was the "Market House": it was arcaded on the ground floor and had an assembly room on the first floor and was completed in 1634. It was used as a munitions store during the English Civil War until it exploded on 25 February 1643. It was restored in 1661 but, by the mid 18th century, it was "in a dangerous and ruinous state". (Note: A plaque presented by Colonel George Monck's Regiment of Foot and now on the wall of the building records these events.)

The current building, which was designed by Robert Newman in the Palladian style, was completed in 1767. It was officially opened by the actor, David Garrick, in 1769. The design for the Sheep Street elevation involved three bays which were originally arcaded on the ground floor; on the first floor there were two windows with a statue of William Shakespeare by John Cheere in a niche between the windows. On the Chapel Street elevation the design involved five bays in a similar style but with the words "God Save the King" painted below the first floor window sills; above the first floor was a large pediment containing the borough's coat of arms. The principal rooms were the courtroom, with a rich coffered ceiling, on the ground floor and the ballroom, with Tuscan order pilasters and fine Rococo detailing, on the first floor.

Council meetings continued to be held in the Guildhall until 1843 when they were transferred to the town hall. The building was altered in 1863, when the arcading was blocked up with windows, and a rear extension was added with a window and a porch facing onto Sheep Street. The courtroom continued to host petty sessions until 1878 when the room was converted into a council chamber. During the First World War, the town hall was used as a Red Cross Voluntary Aid Detachment auxiliary hospital.

The ballroom was badly damaged in a fire in December 1946 but was subsequently restored. The council chamber continued to be the meeting place of the borough council but ceased to be the local seat of government when the enlarged Stratford-on-Avon District Council was formed in 1974. It remains, however, the meeting place of the local town council.

Works of art held by the town hall include David Garrick as Richard III a painting by Nathaniel Dance-Holland depicting David Garrick performing as King Richard III in Shakespeares's play, Richard III, and Sarah Siddons as Euphrasia by William Hamilton depicting Sarah Siddons performing as Euphrasia in Arthur Murphy's play, The Grecian Daughter.
