= Sarah Siddons as Euphrasia =

Painting by William Hamilton

- Artist: William Hamilton
- Year: 1780
- Type: Oil on canvas, portrait painting
- Dimensions: 270 cm × 155 cm (110 in × 61 in)
- Location: Stratford-upon-Avon Town Hall, Warwickshire

Sarah Siddons as Euphrasia is an oil on canvas portrait painting by the British artist William Hamilton, from 1780.

It depicts the celebrated stage actress Sarah Siddons in the role of Euphrasia in the tragedy The Grecian Daughter by the Irish playwright Arthur Murphy. Siddons enjoyed great success with the role. She is shown at full-length, fully in character, doing a dramatic gesture, with a hand raised.

Siddons went on to be painted many times throughout her career, as was her equally famous brother John Philip Kemble. The painting was displayed at the Royal Academy Exhibition of 1780, the first to be held at Somerset House in London. It was turned into a print by the engraver James Caldwall in 1788. Today the picture hangs at Stratford-upon-Avon Town Hall in Warwickshire.

== Bibliography ==
- Levey, Michael. Sir Thomas Lawrence. Yale University Press, 2005.
- Perry, Gillian. Spectacular Flirtations: Viewing the Actress in British Art and Theatre, 1768-1820. Yale University Press, 2007.
