= William Hamilton (painter) =

English painter and illustrator

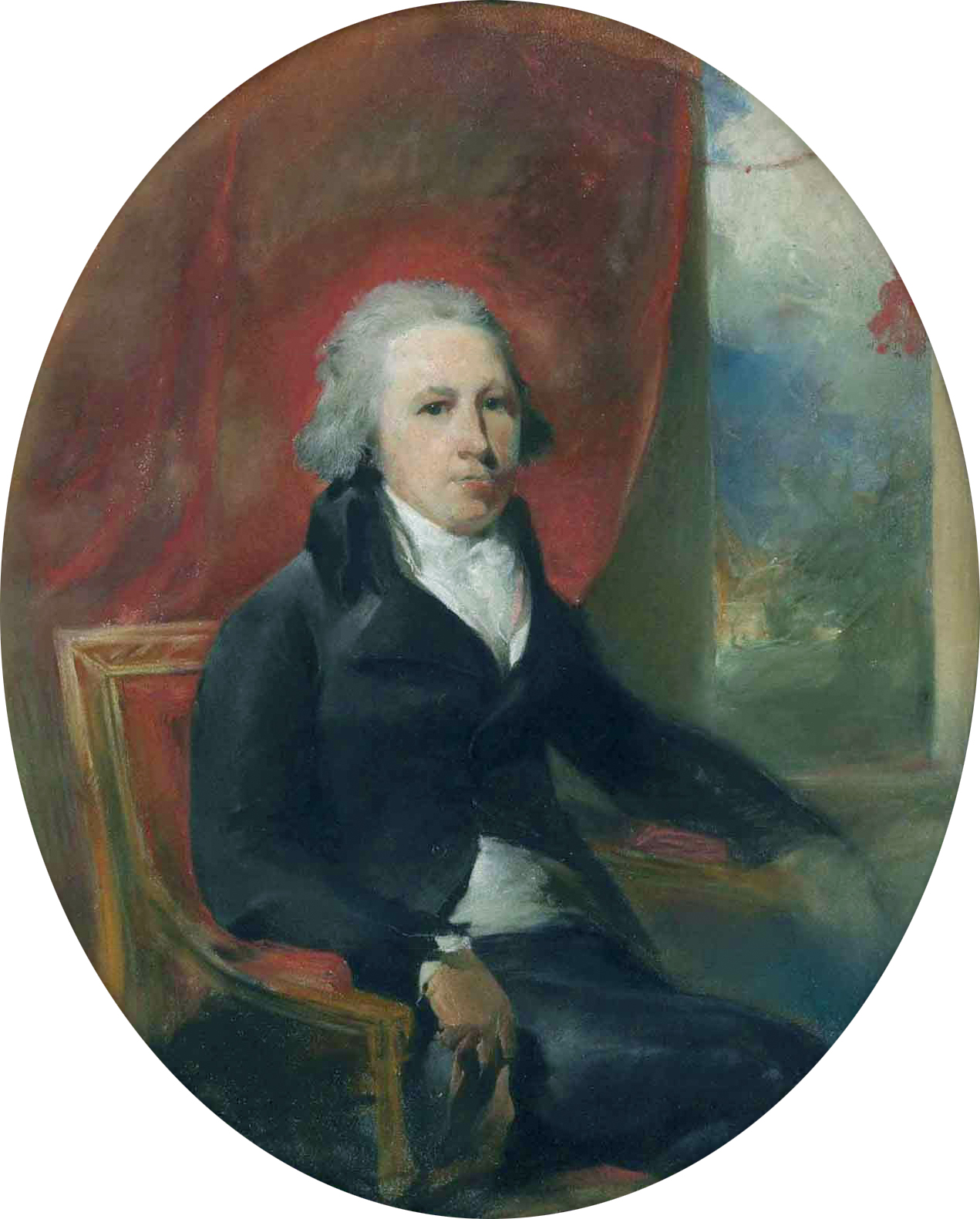
William Hamilton (Thomas Lawrence, 1788)

William Hamilton RA (1751 – 2 December 1801) was an English painter and illustrator.

== Life ==
Hamilton was born in Chelsea, London, but travelled and worked in Italy with Antonio Zucchi for several years. He trained first as an architectural draftsman, but soon moved to theatrical portraits and scenes from plays.

Hamilton became an associate member of the Royal Academy from 1784, and was made a full member in 1789.

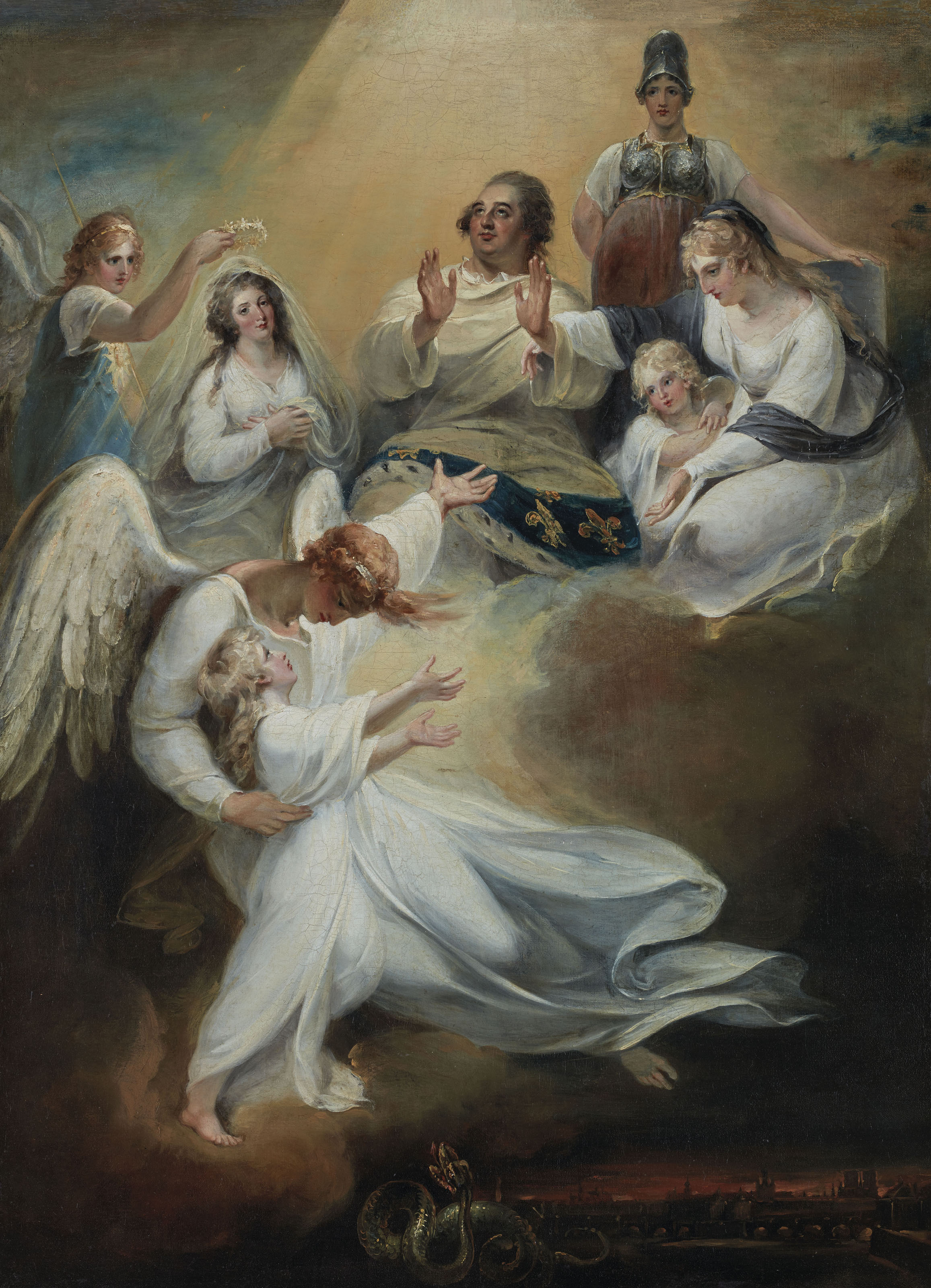
The Apotheosis of Louis XVI, Marie Antoinette is pictured on the right whilst Élisabeth of France receives the martyr's crown

== Works ==
Hamilton became very well known for his paintings depicting episodes from the plays of Shakespeare and for his illustrations of poems. He was commissioned to create works for John Boydell's Shakespeare Gallery, Thomas Macklin's Bible and Robert Bowyer's English History. These were widely reproduced in popular prints. Francesco Bartolozzi engraved a number of Hamilton's best known works.

He also painted modern events, such as the execution of Marie Antoinette, in the manner of epic historical drama. Several battle scenes were also exhibited including The destruction of the Spanish battery ships before Gibraltar in the night of the 13th of Sept. last (1783) and Defence of the Breach at Jean d'Acre by Sir Sidney Smith (1800).

Hamilton's style shows the influence of the cult of sentiment typical of the period, resembling the work of Angelica Kauffman. He also sometimes adopts aspects of Fuseli's dramatic distortions in composition and figure drawing.

== Gallery ==
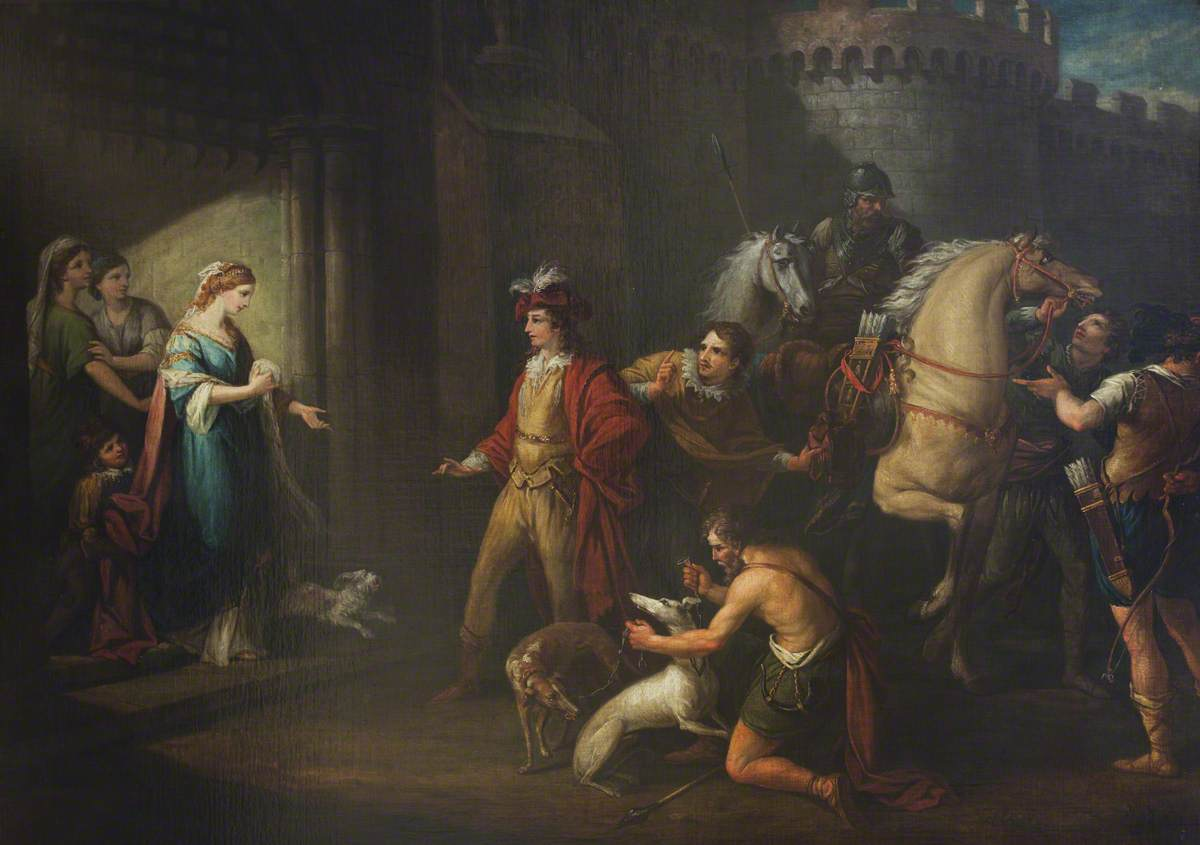
King Edgar's First Interview with Queen Elfrida, 1774

Sarah Siddons as Euphrasia, 1780

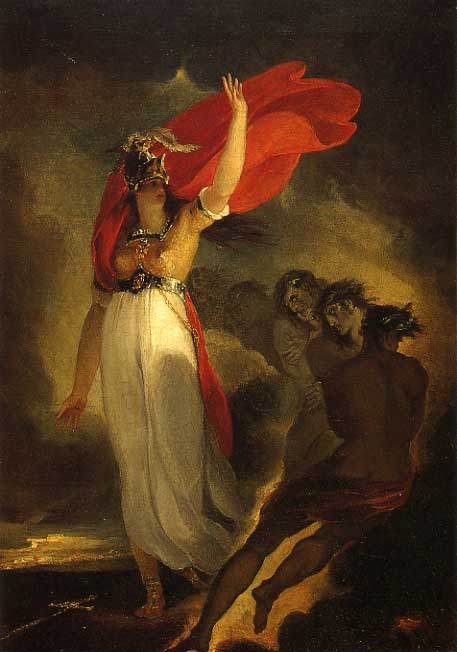
Joan and the Furies, from Henry VI, Part 1

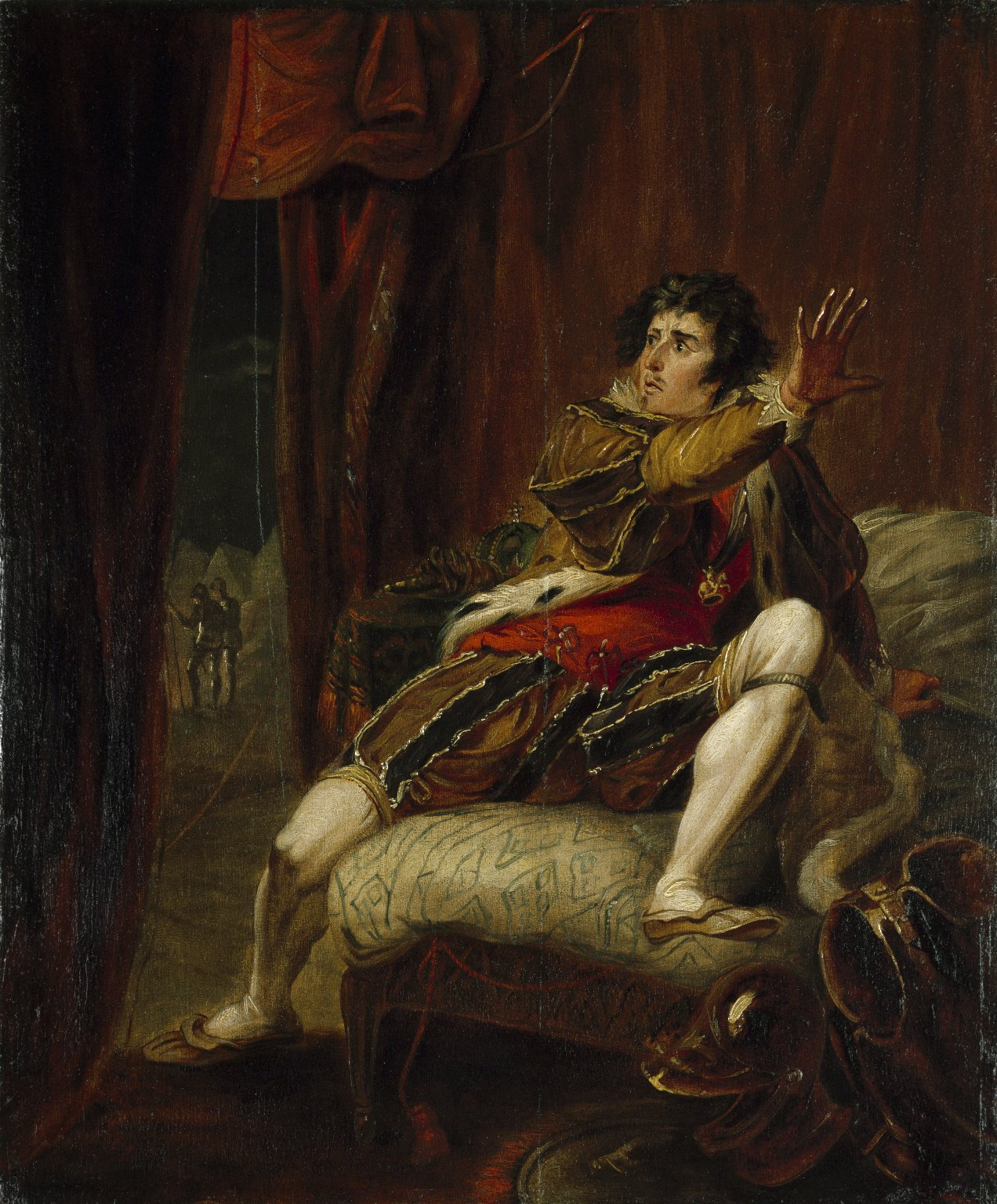
John Philip Kemble as Richard III, c. 1787

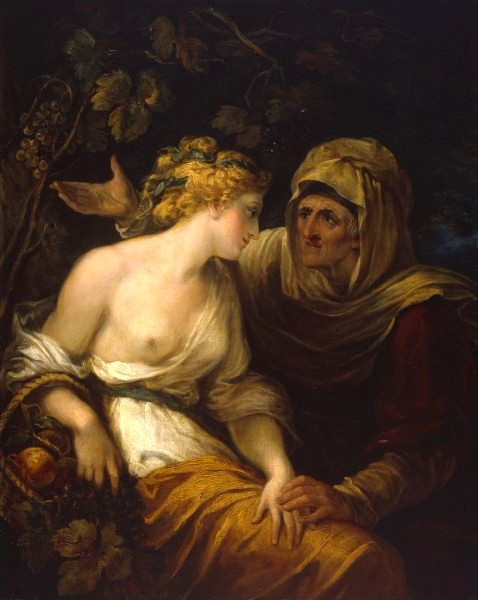
Vertumnus and Pomona, 1789

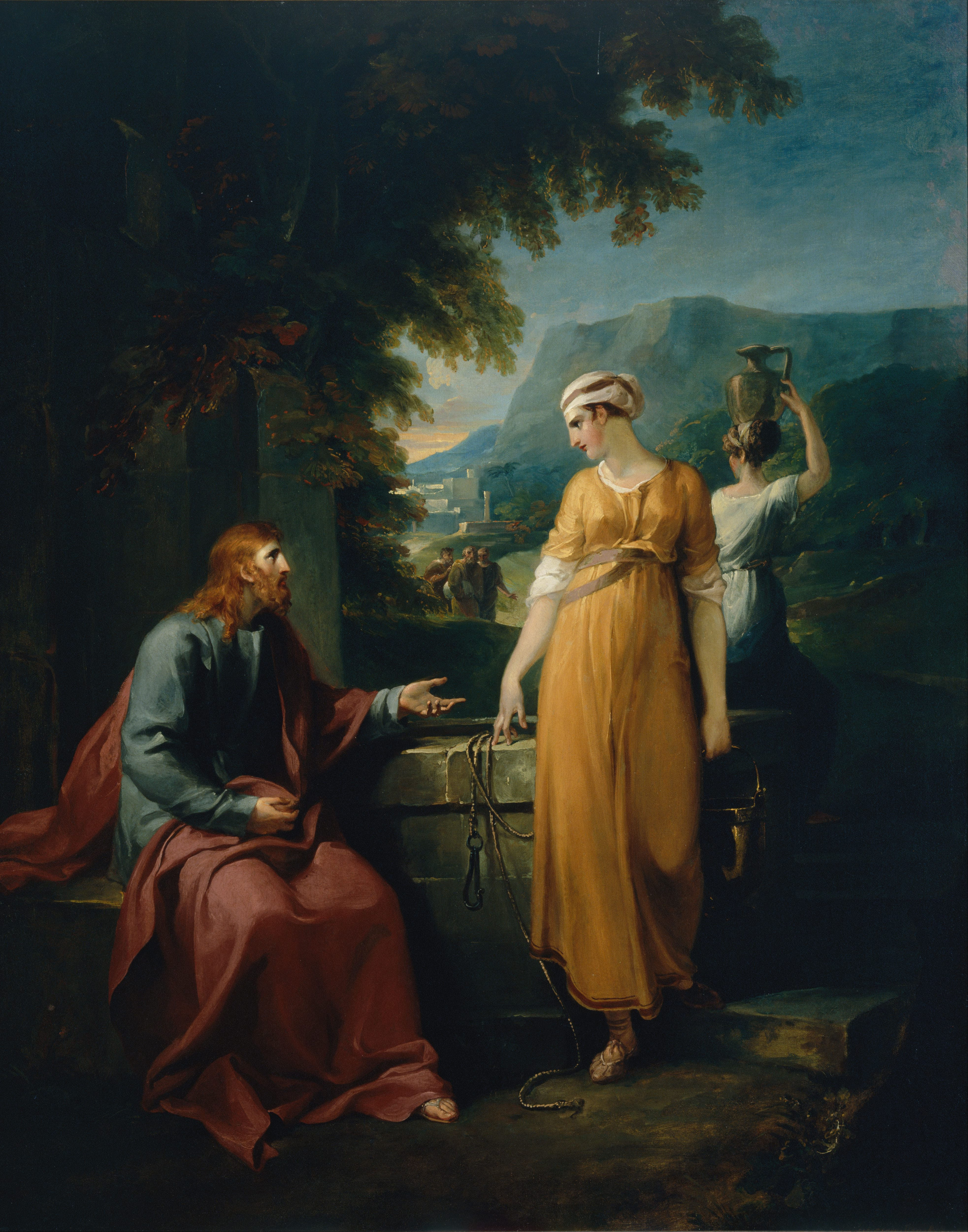
Christ and the Woman of Samaria, 1792

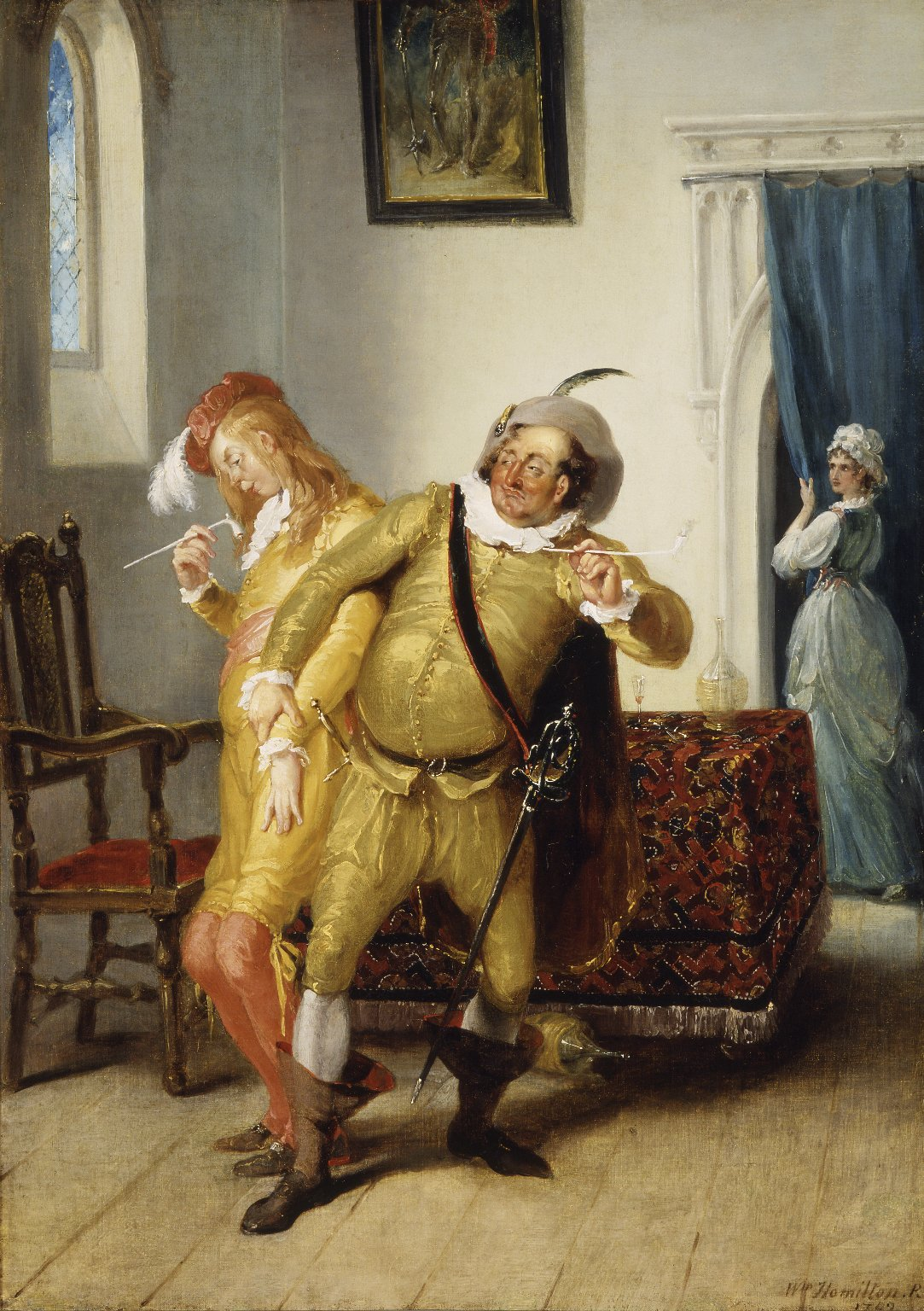
The carousing of Sir Toby Belch and Sir Anthony Aguecheek, 1792

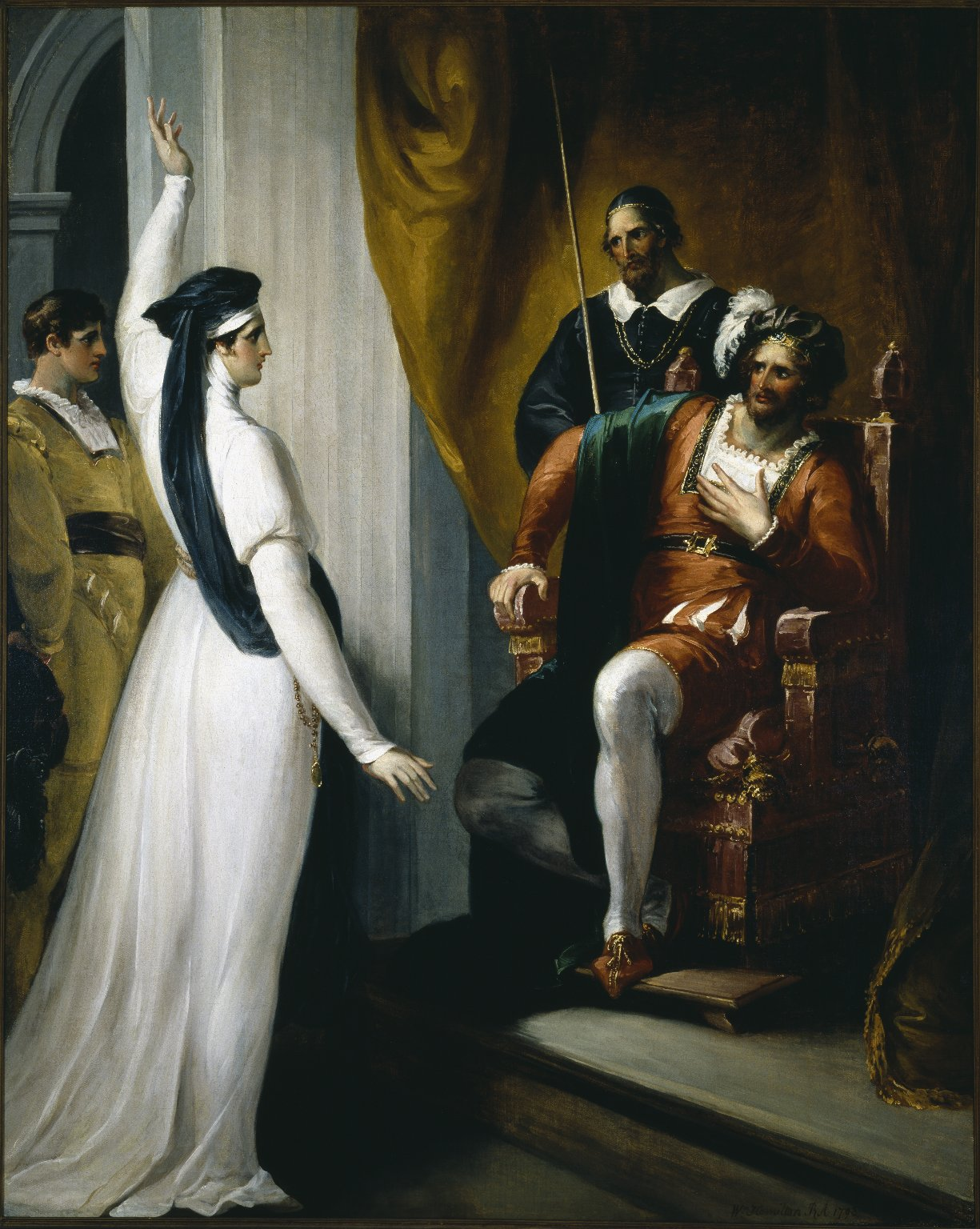
Isabella appealing to Angelo, 1793

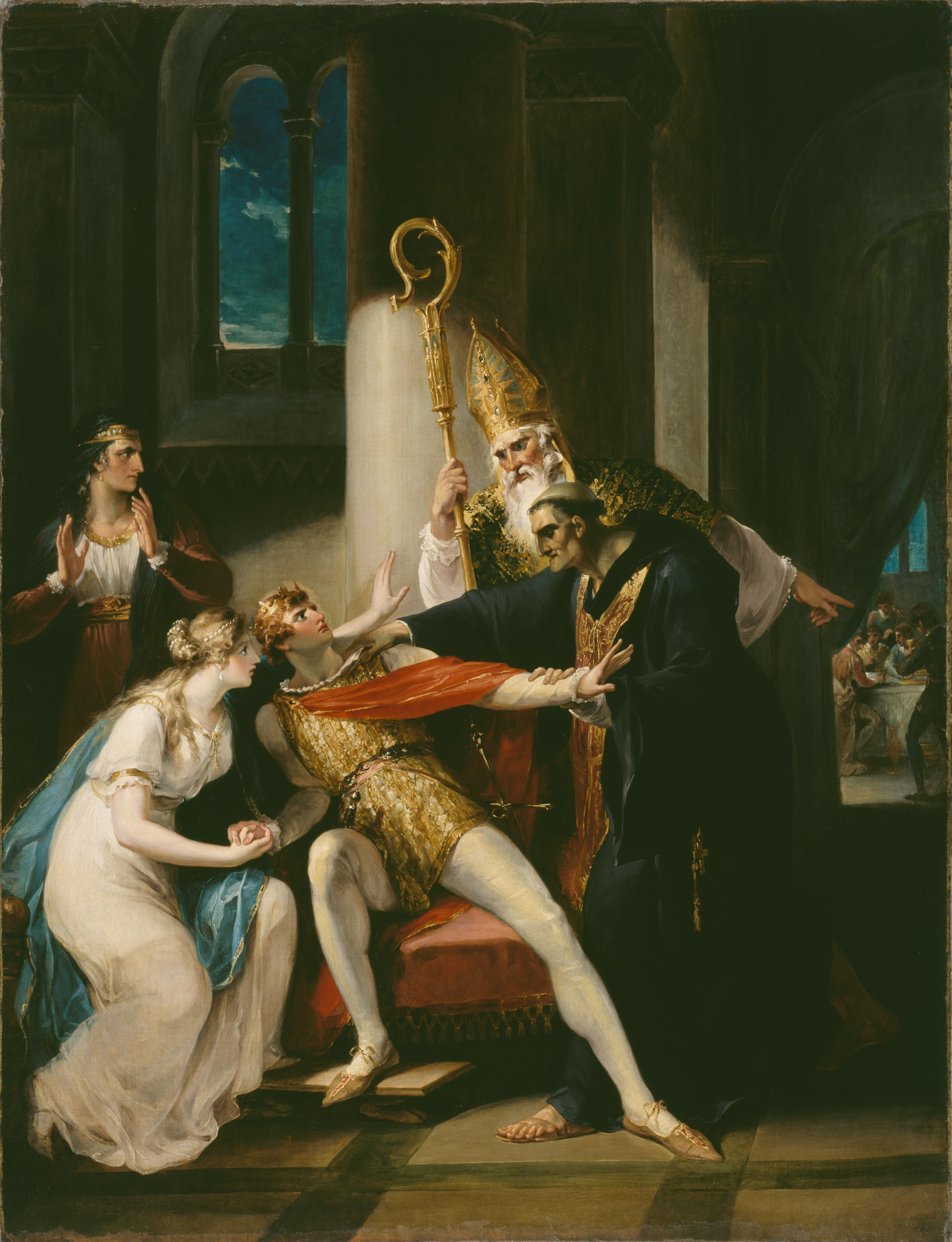
Edwy and Elgiva, 1793

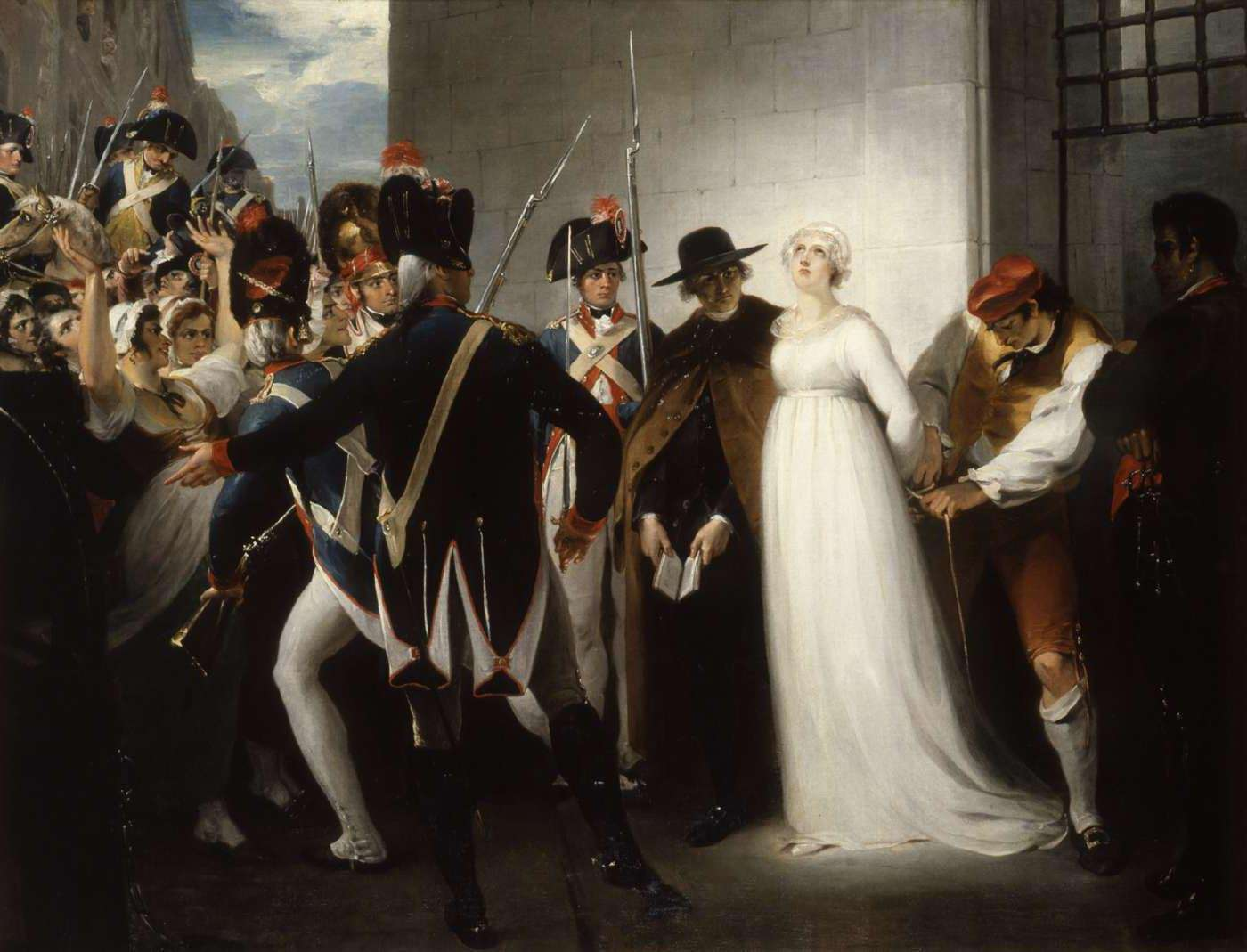
Marie Antoinette Being Taken to Her Execution, 1794 (Musée de la Révolution française)

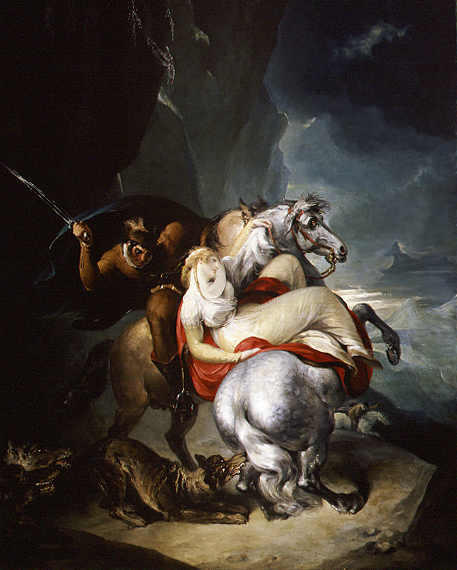
The Wolves Descending from the Alps, 1794

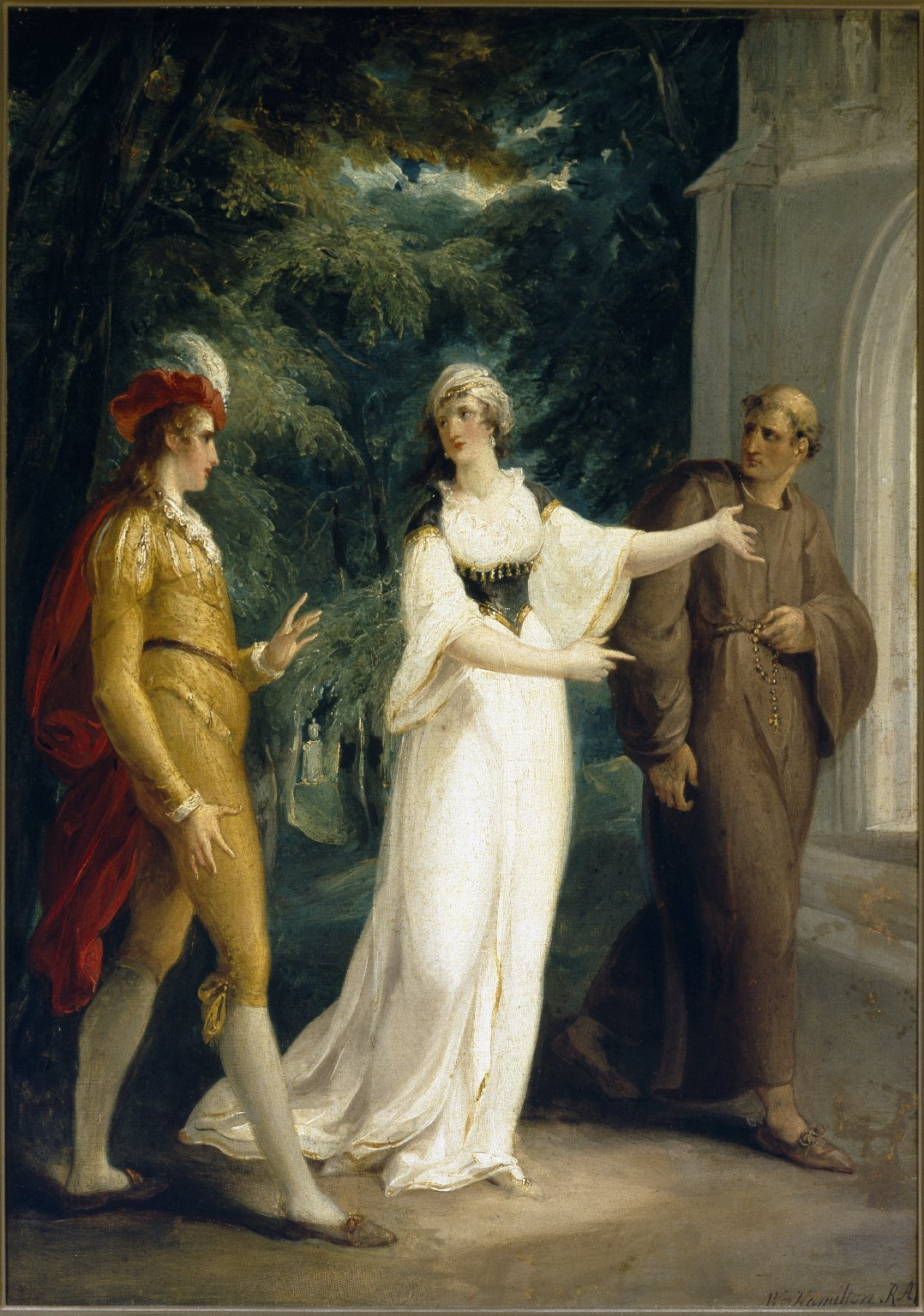
Olivia's proposal, c. 1796

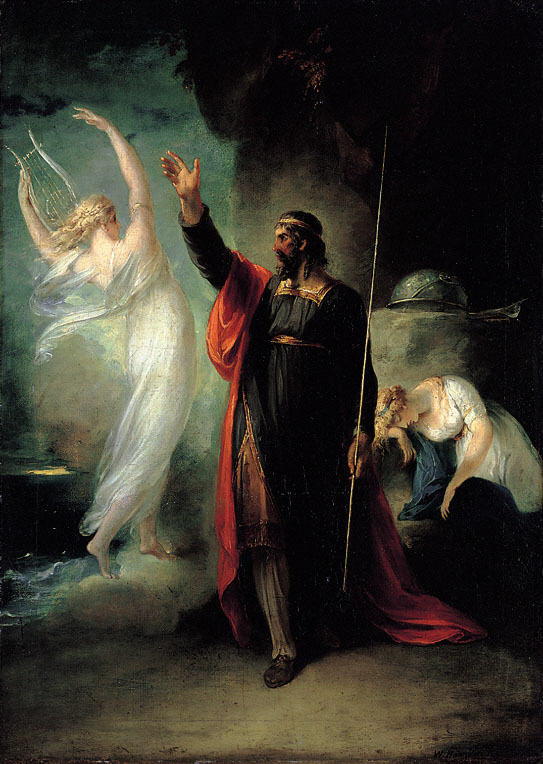
Prospero and Ariel, 1797

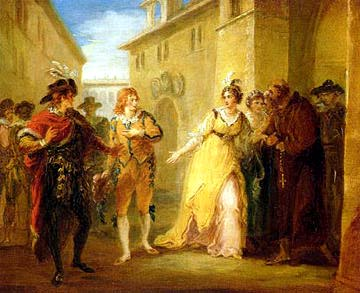
A Scene from Twelfth Night, c. 1797

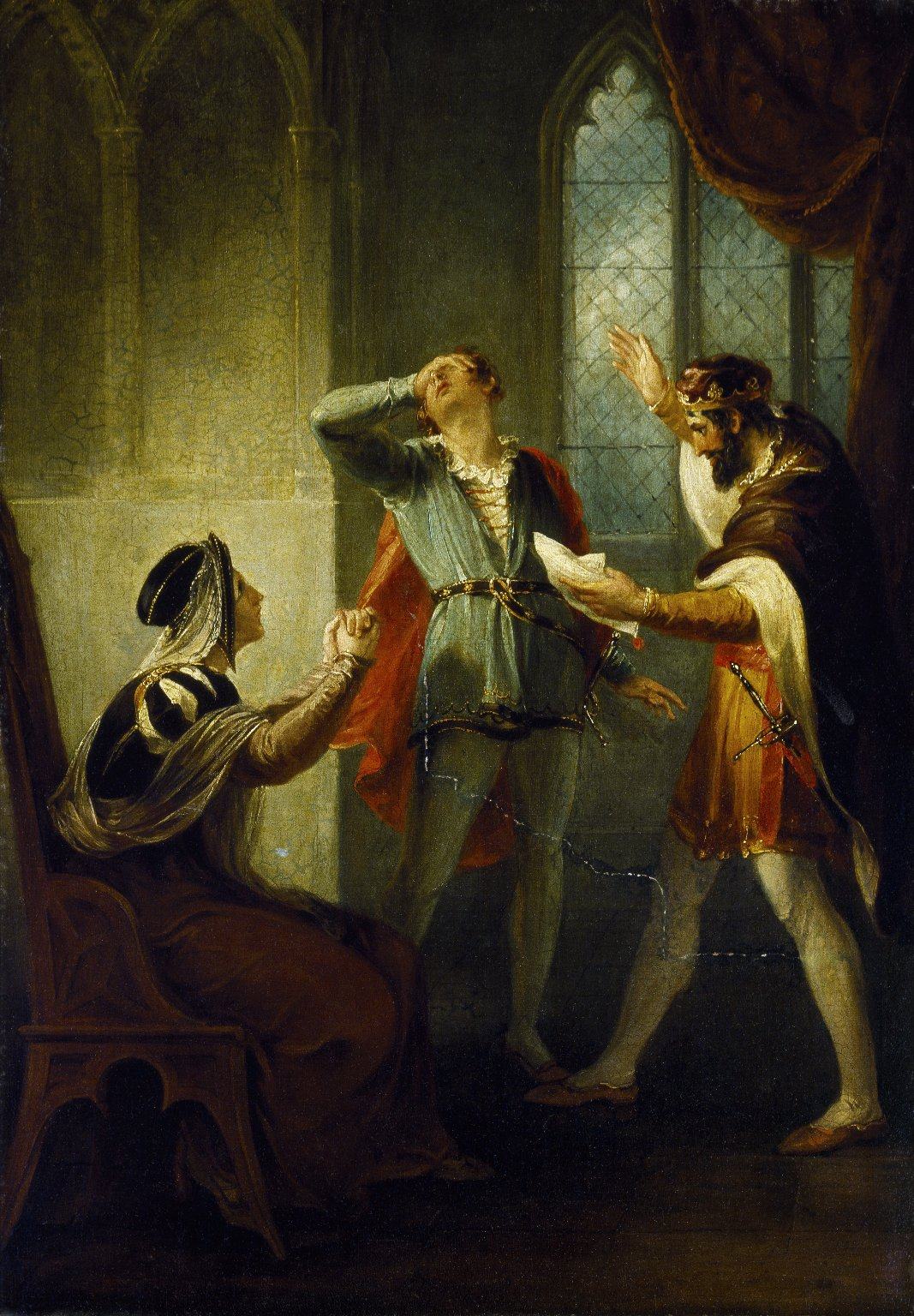
The Duke of York discovering his son Aumerle's treachery, late 1790s
