= David Garrick as Richard III =

1745 painting by William Hogarth

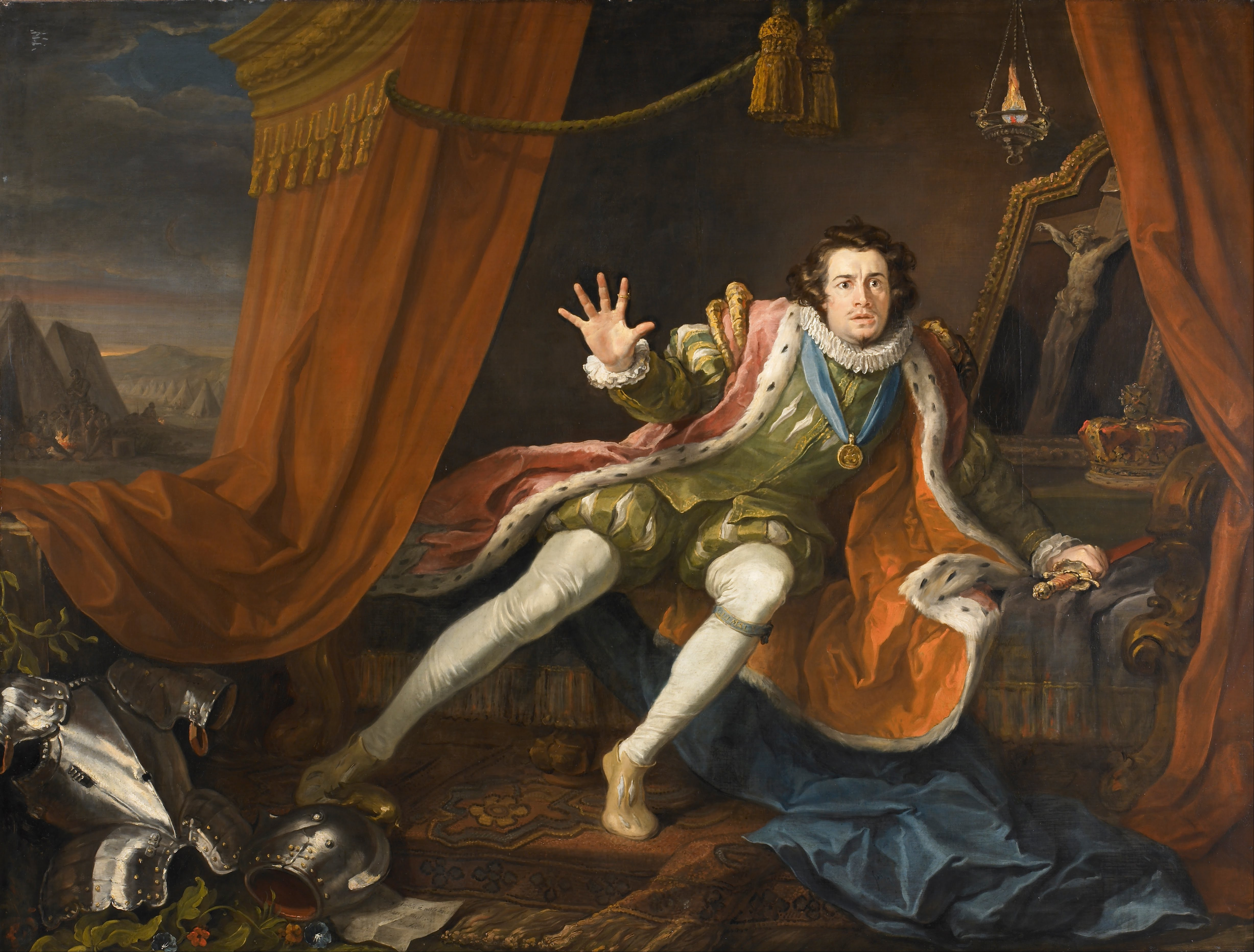
- Artist: William Hogarth
- Year: 1745
- Medium: Oil on canvas
- Dimensions: 190.5 cm × 250.8 cm (75.0 in × 98.7 in)
- Location: Walker Art Gallery, Liverpool

David Garrick as Richard III is an oil on canvas painting by the English artist William Hogarth, from 1745. It is held in the Walker Art Gallery, in Liverpool.

== History and description ==
The painting is usually said to show the actor and stage manager David Garrick in the role of Richard III in Shakespeare's play. In fact it records his performance in the radically adapted version of Colley Cibber, whose Richard III held the stage from 1700 until 1896. It depicts a dramatic moment in the play on the eve of the Battle of Bosworth (1485). The king, who had been asleep in his tent on the battlefield, has just woken from a dream in which he has seen the ghosts of the opponents he had previously murdered. Hogarth was a friend of Garrick, who had gained a degree of fame through his portrayal of Richard III at the Drury Lane Theatre in London. The painting shows the actor with fear and concern, one arm raised and with a shocked expression on his face. Garrick both debuted upon the London stage, and retired from acting, in the role of Richard III.

Hogarth, best remembered for his satirical prints on social themes, was also a skilled painter and portraitist. This painting, much more than just a portrait, shows the subject at a key time in history, and also in theatrical pose. It falls between the commonly accepted genres of portraiture and historical painting. The pose used by Hogarth was similar to other that used for other portraits of actors, especially those by Zoffany. Having compared Hogarth's painting with those of Garrick by Reynolds, Gill Parry concludes that Hogarth had helped to establish a new subgenre within portraiture, that of the theatrical portrait. The pose adopted by the actor was described by Hogarth as "the serpentine line"; he saw it as "being composed of two curves contrasted". In his 1753 treatise The Analysis of Beauty he suggests that this is a particularly beautiful shape which "gives play to the imagination and delights the eye".

The painting is in oil on canvas and measures 190.5 centimetres (75.0 in) by 250.8 centimetres (98.7 in). It is owned by the Walker Art Gallery in Liverpool, Merseyside, England, and was purchased by the gallery in 1956 with help from the National Art Collections Fund.

== See also ==
- List of works by William Hogarth
- David Garrick as Richard III at Bosworth, a 1771 portrait by Nathaniel Dance-Holland

== Sources ==
- Crawford, Jack Randall, ed. (1927). "Appendix B". The Tragedy of Richard the Third . The Yale Shakespeare. New Haven and London: Yale University Press.
- Perry, Gill (1999). "'Mere Face Painters'? Hogarth, Reynolds and ideas of academic art in eighteenth-century Britain". In Perry, Gill; Cunningham, Colin (eds.). Academies, Museums and Canons of Art. Art and its Histories. New Haven and London: Yale University Press. ISBN 0-300-07743-2.
- Walker Art Gallery (1994). The Walker Art Gallery. London: Scala. ISBN 1-85759-037-6.
