= David Garrick as Richard III at Bosworth =

1771 painting by Nathaniel Dance-Holland

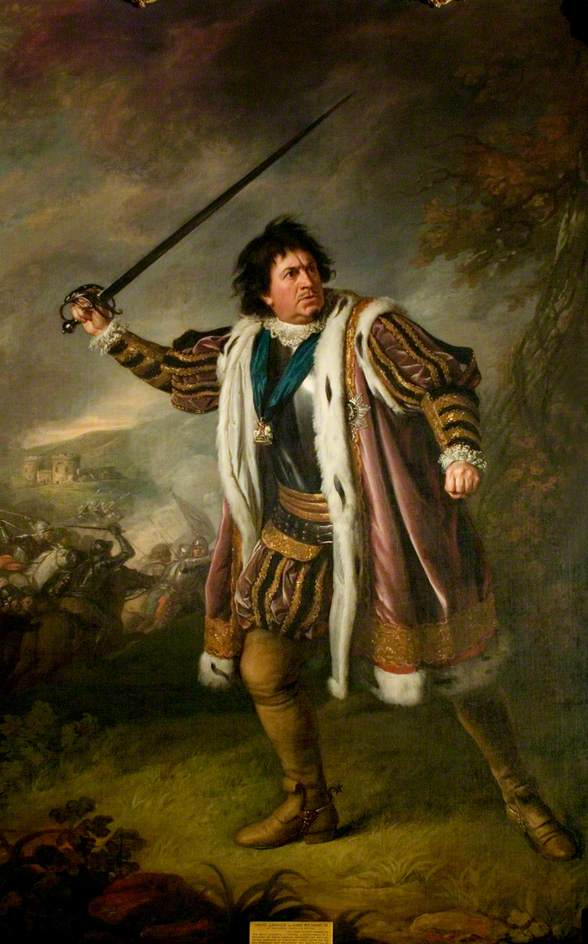
- Artist: Nathaniel Dance-Holland
- Year: 1771
- Type: Oil on canvas, portrait painting
- Dimensions: 236.4 cm × 144 cm (93.1 in × 57 in)
- Location: Stratford-upon-Avon Town Hall, Warwickshire

David Garrick as Richard III at Bosworth is an oil on canvas portrait painting by the British artist Nathaniel Dance-Holland, from 1771.

== History and description ==
It depicts the British actor David Garrick in the title role of William Shakespeare's play Richard III. He portrays the king leading his army at the Battle of Bosworth Field in 1485. Dance-Holland had also adapted one of Shakespeare's other works as a history painting Timon of Athens rather than a portrait. The actor-manager of the Theatre Royal, Drury Lane, Garrick was at the height of his career when Dance-Holland painted him. Two years earlier he had overseen the Shakespeare Jubilee in the playwright's birthplace Stratford-upon-Avon.

It was displayed at the Royal Academy Exhibition of 1771 in Pall Mall. Today the painting is in the collection of Stratford-upon-Avon Town Hall, having been acquired in 1947. William Hogarth had also earlier notably depicted Garrick in the role with his David Garrick as Richard III (1745).

== Bibliography ==
- Barnden, Sally & McMullan, Gordon & Retford, Kate & Tambling, Kirsten (ed.). Shakespeare's Afterlife in the Royal Collection: Dynasty, Ideology, and National Culture. Oxford University Press, 2025.
- Brewer, John. The Pleasures of the Imagination: English Culture in the Eighteenth Century. Routledge, 2013.
- Kenny, Shirley Strum (ed.) British Theatre and the Other Arts, 1660–1800. Associated University Presses, 1984.
- Swindells, Julia & Taylor, David Francis. The Oxford Handbook of the Georgian Theatre 1737–1832. OUP, 2014.
