= Marie Antoinette Being Taken to Her Execution (Hamilton) =

Painting by William Hamilton

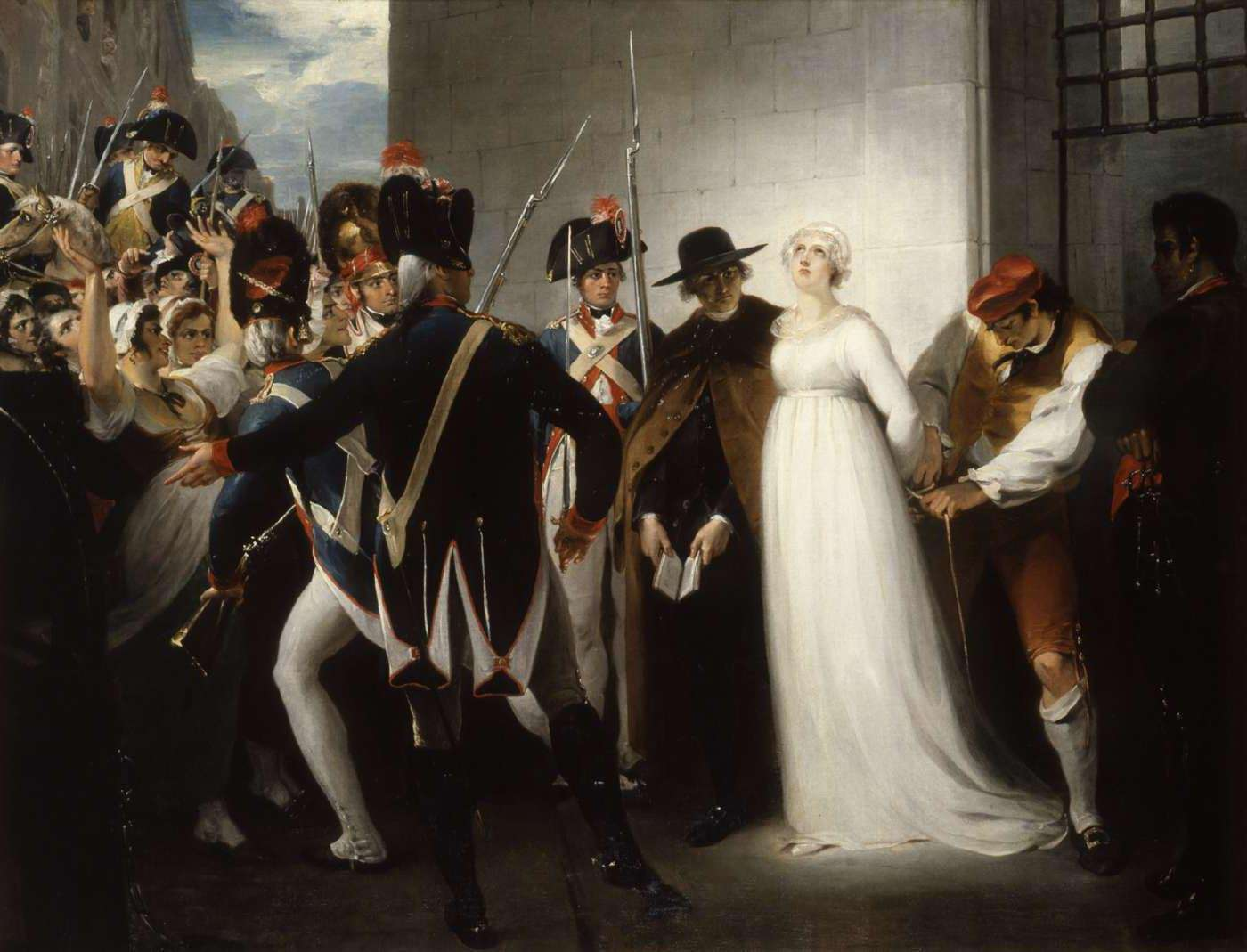
- Artist: William Hamilton
- Year: 1794
- Type: Oil on canvas, history painting
- Dimensions: 152 cm × 197 cm (60 in × 78 in)
- Location: Musée de la Révolution française, Vizille

Marie Antoinette Being Taken to Her Execution is an oil on canvas history painting by the British artist William Hamilton, from 1794. It depicts a scene from the French Revolution, in Paris.

== History and description ==
On 16 October 1793 Marie Antoinette, the widow of the deposed French monarch Louis XVI, who had been executed earlier that year, was herself taken to be guillotined.

The queen is portrayed in white, traditionally the colour of martyrdom, emphasising her innocence, with the executioner Charles-Henri Sanson binding her hands. A priest is shown beside her, while soldiers hold back the revolutionary mob of Sans-culottes. The composition emphasises the former queen's dignity. It was produced at a time when Great Britain and the French Republic were at war. Today the painting is in the collection of the Musée de la Révolution française, in Vizille.

== Bibliography ==
- Bindman, David & Dawson, Aileen. The Shadow of the Guillotine: Britain and the French Revolution. Trustees of the British Museum, 1989.
- Rauser, Amelia. The Age of Undress: Art, Fashion, and the Classical Ideal in the 1790s Yale University Press, 2020.
- Worth, Rachel. Fashion and Class. Bloomsbury Publishing, 2020.
