= King Edgar's First Interview with Queen Elfrida =

Painting by William Hamilton

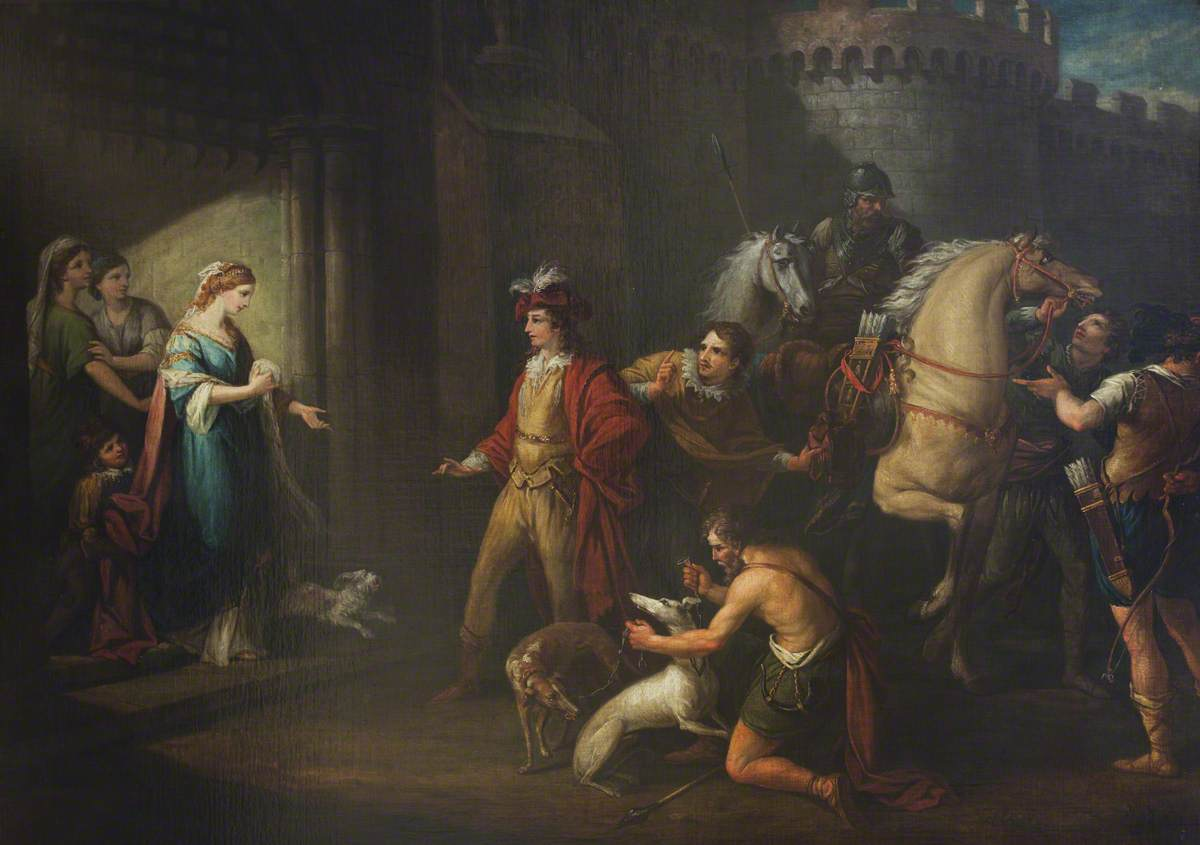
- Artist: William Hamilton
- Year: 1774
- Type: Oil on canvas, history painting
- Dimensions: 134.6 cm × 182.9 cm (53.0 in × 72.0 in)
- Location: Sudbury Hall, Derbyshire

King Edgar's First Interview with Queen Elfrida is an oil on canvas history painting by the British artist William Hamilton, from 1774. It is held at Sudbury Hall, in Derbyshire.

== History and description ==
It depicts a scene from the Anglo-Saxon period. Edgar, King of England was considering a marriage to Elfrida and sent his ally Athelwold to meet her. However Athelwold fell in love with her and married her himself. Edgar, intrigued, arrived at her family home at Corfe Castle in Dorset and was also entranced. Athelwold was later killed while out hunting and Elfrida became Queen of England

The subject was a popular one in the mid-Georgian era. Angelica Kauffman had produced her own picture based in the story in 1771. The painting was displayed at the Royal Academy Exhibition of 1774, held at Pall Mall, in London. Today the painting is in the collection of Sudbury Hall, in Derbyshire, under the control of the National Trust, which acquired it in 1987.

== Bibliography ==
- Graves, Algernon. The Royal Academy of Arts: A Complete Dictionary of Contributors. H. Graves and Company, 1905.
- Haywood, Ian, Matthews, Susan & Shannon, Mary L. (ed.) Romanticism and Illustration. Cambridge University Press, 2019.
