= Richard III (play) =

Shakespearean history play

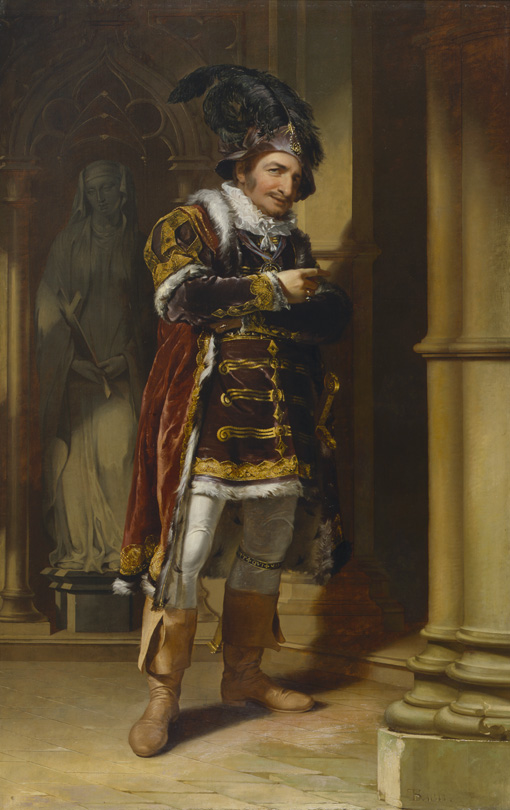
George Frederick Cooke as Richard III, by Thomas Sully (1811–1812)

The Tragedy of Richard the Third, often shortened to Richard III, is a play by William Shakespeare, which depicts the Machiavellian rise to power and subsequent short reign of King Richard III of England.

It was probably written c. 1592–1594. It is labelled a history in the First Folio and is usually considered one. In the quarto edition and elsewhere it is listed as a tragedy given its meditations on conscience, decision making, and death. Richard III concludes Shakespeare's first tetralogy which also contains Henry VI, Part 1, Henry VI, Part 2, and Henry VI, Part 3.

It is the second longest play in the Shakespearean canon by word count and the fourth longest by number of lines, as well as the longest of the First Folio. Hamlet, otherwise the longest, is shorter than its quarto counterpart. The play is often abridged for brevity, and peripheral characters removed. In such cases, extra lines are often invented or added from elsewhere to establish the nature of the characters' relationships. Shakespeare also assumed his audiences' familiarity with his Henry VI plays, frequently referring to them.

== Characters ==
=== House of York ===
- Edward IV – King of England
- Richard, Duke of Gloucester – the title character, Edward IV's brother; later King Richard III
- George Plantagenet, Duke of Clarence – Edward IV's brother
- Duchess of York – Edward, Richard and George's mother
- Edward, Prince of Wales – Edward IV's eldest son; later King Edward V (never crowned)
- Richard, Duke of York – Edward IV's younger son
- Boy – George's son
- Girl – George's daughter

=== House of Lancaster ===
- Queen Margaret – widow of King Henry VI
- Ghost of King Henry VI
- Ghost of Edward of Westminster, Prince of Wales – Henry VI's son
- Lady Anne Neville – widow of Edward of Westminster; later wife of King Richard III
- Tressel and Berkeley – Lady Anne's attendants (non-speaking roles)

=== Woodville family ===
- Queen Elizabeth – wife of King Edward IV
- Earl Rivers – Elizabeth's brother
- Marquis of Dorset – Elizabeth's son (from a previous marriage)
- Lord Richard Grey – Elizabeth's son (from a previous marriage)
- Sir Thomas Vaughan – ally of Rivers and Grey

=== Richard III's group ===
- Duke of Buckingham
- Sir William Catesby
- Duke of Norfolk
- Earl of Surrey (Note: Surrey appears only in the Folio text; his lines in 5.3 are assigned to Catesby in the quartos.) – Norfolk's son
- Sir Richard Ratcliffe
- Sir James Tyrrell – assassin
- Lord Lovel (Note: Lovell appears only in the Folio text; in the quartos, his line in 3.4 is absent and his line in 3.5 is spoken by Catesby.)
- Two Murderers
- Richard's page

=== Earl of Richmond's group ===
- Henry Tudor, Earl of Richmond – Henry VI's nephew; later King Henry VII
- Lord Stanley, Earl of Derby – Richmond's stepfather
- Earl of Oxford (Note: Oxford is identified by name only in the Folio text. In the quartos, he is simply "First Lord".)
- Sir Walter Herbert (Note: Herbert is identified by name only in the Folio text. In the quartos, he is simply "Second Lord".)
- Sir James Blunt (Note: Although Blunt is identified by name in 5.4 of both the Folio text and the quartos, he is also referred to as "Third Lord" in 5.2 of the quartos.)
- Sir William Brandon – Richmond's standard-bearer (non-speaking role)

=== Clergy ===
- Archbishop of Canterbury (Note: Identified only in the Folio text; in the quartos, he is simply "Cardinal", and is amalgamated with the Archbishop of York.)
- Archbishop of York (Note: Identified only in the Folio text; in the quartos, he is simply "Cardinal", and is amalgamated with the Archbishop of Canterbury.)
- Bishop of Ely
- Sir Christopher – chaplain of Stanley's household
- John – priest

=== Other characters ===
- Lord Hastings – Lord Chamberlain under Edward IV
- Sir Robert Brackenbury – Lieutenant of the Tower
- Lord Mayor of London
- Scrivener
- Keeper of the Tower (Note: Appears only in the Folio text; in the quartos, his lines in 1.4 are spoken by Sir Robert Brackenbury.)
- Three Citizens
- Hastings – pursuivant (Note: The pursuivant is identified as Hastings only in the quartos; in the Folio text he is referred to as "sirrah".)
- Sheriff of Wiltshire (Note: Wiltshire appears only in the Folio text; his lines in 5.1 are assigned to Ratcliffe in the quartos.)
- Ghosts of Clarence, Rivers, Grey, Vaughan, Edward (Prince of Wales), Richard (Duke of York), Hastings, Lady Anne and Buckingham
- Lords, Messengers, Soldiers etc.

== Synopsis ==
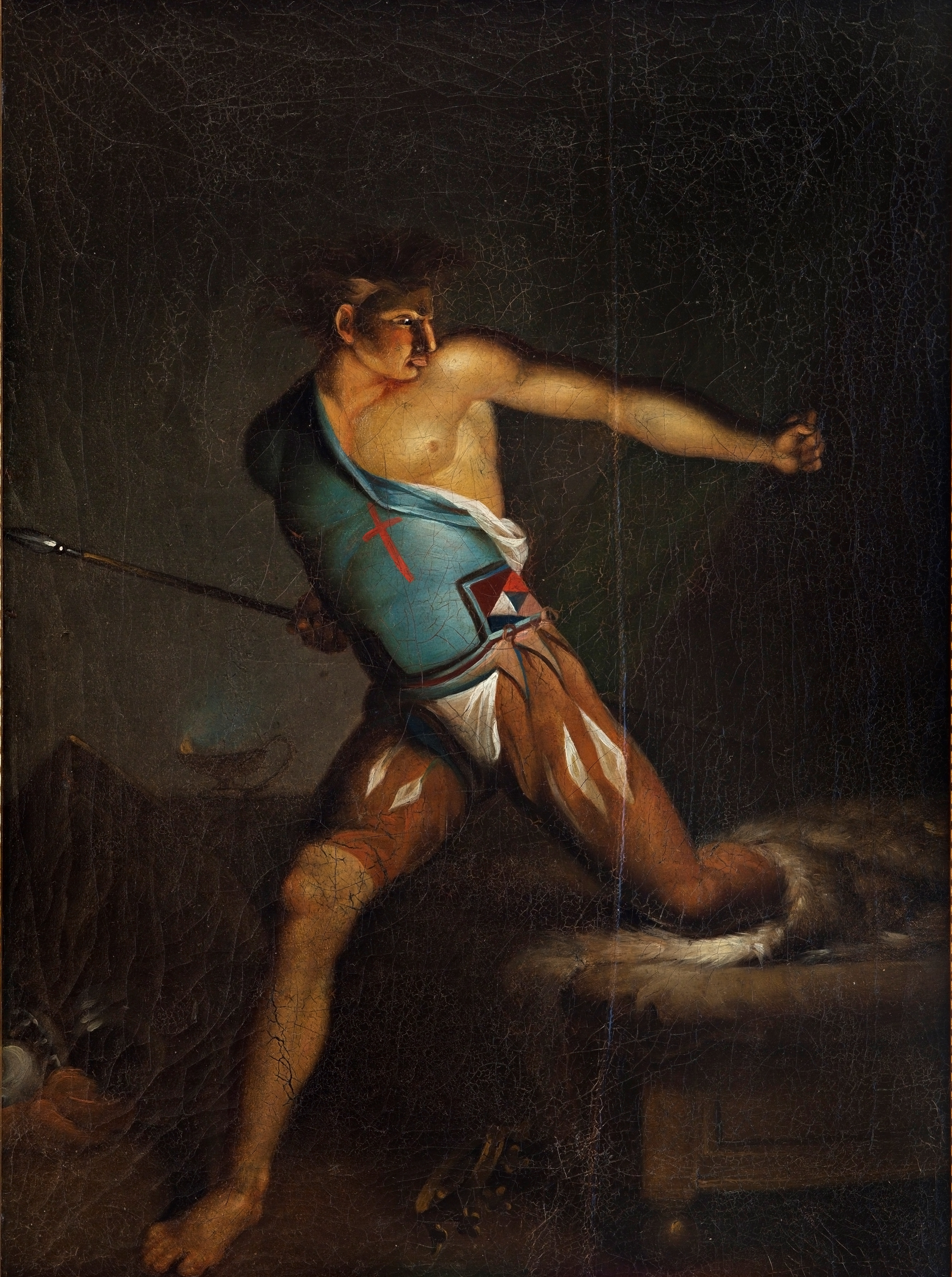
Richard III terrified by nightmarish visions. Shakespeare, Act 5, Scene 9, painting by Nicolai Abildgaard. Nivaagaard Collection.

The play begins with Richard of Gloucester, the youngest brother of King Edward IV, describing Edward's re-accession to the throne (implying the year is 1471, after the Battle of Tewkesbury):

Now is the winter of our discontent
Made glorious summer by this sun of York;
And all the clouds that lour'd upon our house
In the deep bosom of the ocean buried.

Despite this new era of peace and joy, Richard is an ugly and unloved hunchback who is therefore "determined to prove a villain". Due to a prophecy that "G of Edward's heirs the murderer shall be", Richard and Edward's brother Clarence (whose given name is George) is placed under arrest. (Edward interpreted the prophecy as referring to George, but it could just as easily refer to Richard of Gloucester.) Speaking to Clarence as he is escorted along to the Tower of London, Richard blames the queen, Elizabeth, and says that he will try to help Clarence.

Richard describes to the audience his plot to marry Lady Anne, despite being responsible for the death of her father and her husband. Anne attends the corpse of the late king, Henry VI, lamenting. When Richard appears, Anne berates him and says that "Henry's wounds [...] bleed afresh". He confesses to murdering the king, saying her beauty motivated it, and she spits at him. He proclaims his feelings for her and offers his sword for her to kill him, but she drops it. He then offers to kill himself, but she instead accepts his ring unhappily (and, it is implied, marriage) as he promises to repent for the murder. Richard exults at having won her over and tells the audience that he will discard her once she has served his purpose.

The atmosphere at Edward's court is poisonous. The established nobles are at odds with the ambitious relatives of Elizabeth, a hostility fuelled by Richard's machinations. Queen Margaret, Henry VI's widow, returns, though banished, and she warns the squabbling nobles about Richard, cursing extensively. The nobles, all Yorkists, unite against this last Lancastrian and ignore her warnings.

Richard orders two murderers to assassinate Clarence. The murderers arrive at the Tower with a warrant and, while they ponder how to carry out the deed, Clarence wakes and pleads for his life, telling them to go to Richard, who will reward them better for having kept him alive. One of the murderers explains that Richard hates him and indeed sent them, before they stab Clarence and drown him in a butt of Malmsey wine (the year 1478).

The nobles pledge absent enmities before Edward, and Elizabeth asks him to pardon his brother Clarence. Richard reveals that Clarence is dead on the king's own orders. Edward, who is ill and near death, is much upset by this news, expecting the order of execution to have been stopped in time, and Richard openly blames those attending Edward. Edward soon dies, and Richard becomes Protector (1483). Several prominent officials in Edward's court have been imprisoned. His two young boys, including the uncrowned Edward V, are coaxed by Richard into an extended stay at the Tower of London.

Assisted by his cousin Buckingham, Richard mounts a campaign to present himself as the true heir to the throne, pretending to be a modest and devout man with no pretensions to greatness. Edward's Lord Chamberlain, who objects to Richard's accession, is arrested and executed on a trumped-up charge of treason. Richard and Buckingham spread the rumour that Edward's two sons are illegitimate and therefore have no rightful claims, assisted by certain allies. The other lords are thus cajoled into accepting Richard as king, despite the continued survival of his nephews (the Princes in the Tower).

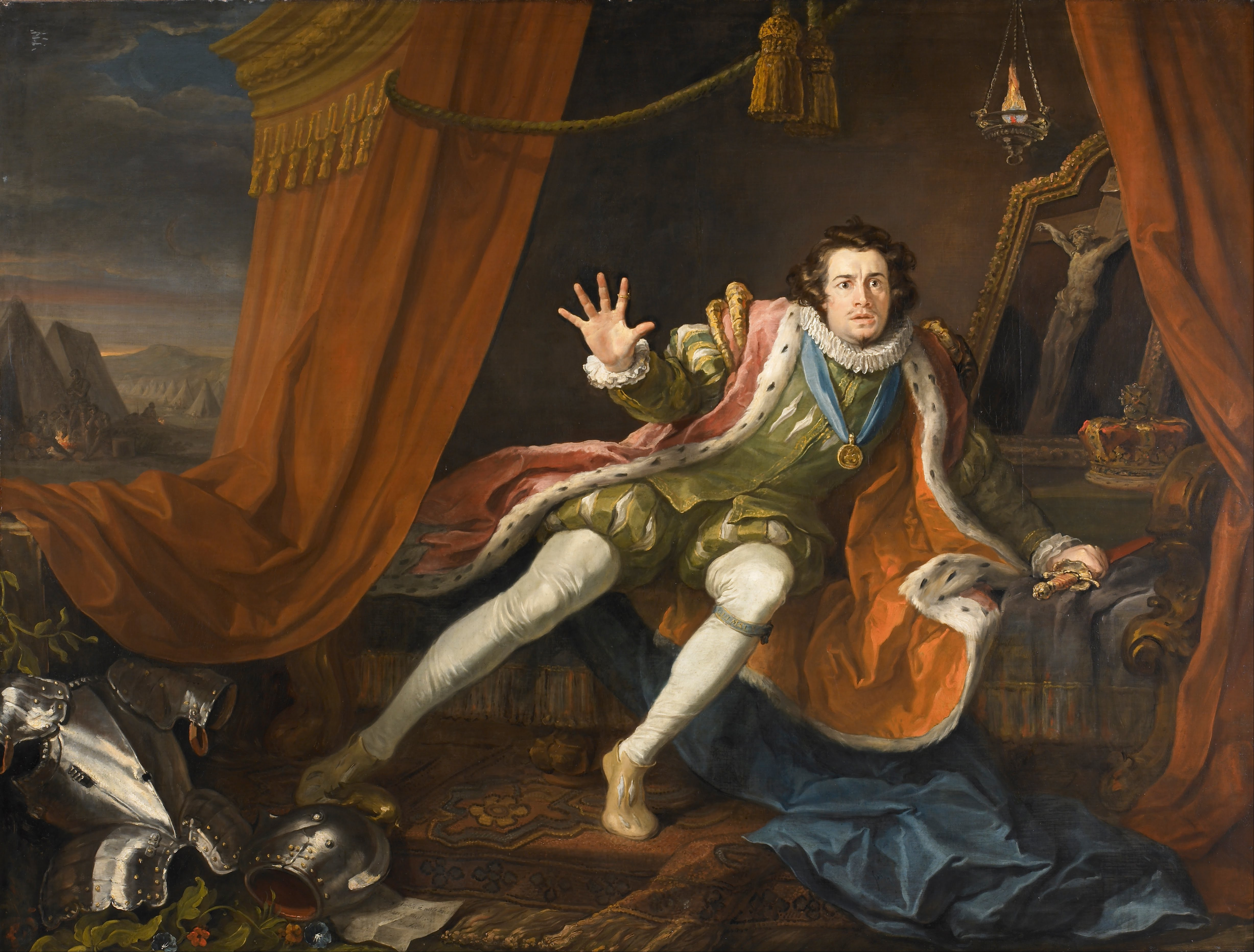
English actor David Garrick as Richard III just before the battle of Bosworth Field. His sleep having been haunted by the ghosts of those he has murdered, he wakes to the realisation that he is alone in the world and death is imminent. David Garrick as Richard III (1745), William Hogarth

Richard asks Buckingham to assassinate the princes, but Buckingham hesitates. Richard instead recruits an assassin who kills both children. When Richard denies Buckingham a promised land grant, Buckingham turns against Richard and defects to the side of Henry VI's nephew, the Earl of Richmond, who is currently in exile. Richard has his eye on the young Elizabeth of York, Edward IV's next remaining heir, and kills Lady Anne by poison so he can be free to woo this younger Elizabeth. Richard's mother, the Duchess of York, and the older Elizabeth mourn the princes' deaths. As prophesied, Queen Elizabeth asks Queen Margaret for help in cursing Richard. Later, the Duchess applies this lesson and curses her only surviving son before fleeing. Richard asks Queen Elizabeth to help him win her daughter Elizabeth's hand in marriage. She is not taken in by his eloquence, and stalls by saying that she will let him know her daughter's answer in due course.

The increasingly paranoid Richard loses what popularity he had. He faces rebellions, led first by Buckingham and subsequently by Richmond's invading forces. Buckingham is captured and executed. Both sides arrive for a final battle at Bosworth Field, prior to which Richard, asleep, is visited by the ghosts of his victims, each telling him to "Despair and die". They likewise wish for Richmond's victory. Richard wakes, screaming for Jesus, then realises that he is all alone and cannot even pity himself.

At the Battle of Bosworth Field (1485), Richmond's stepfather Lord Stanley and his followers desert Richard, whereupon Richard calls for the execution of Stanley's son: a young hostage. This does not happen, however, as the battle is in full swing, and Richard is at a disadvantage. Richard is unhorsed on the field, and cries out, "A horse, a horse, my kingdom for a horse". Richmond kills Richard and claims the throne, becoming Henry VII.

== Date and text ==
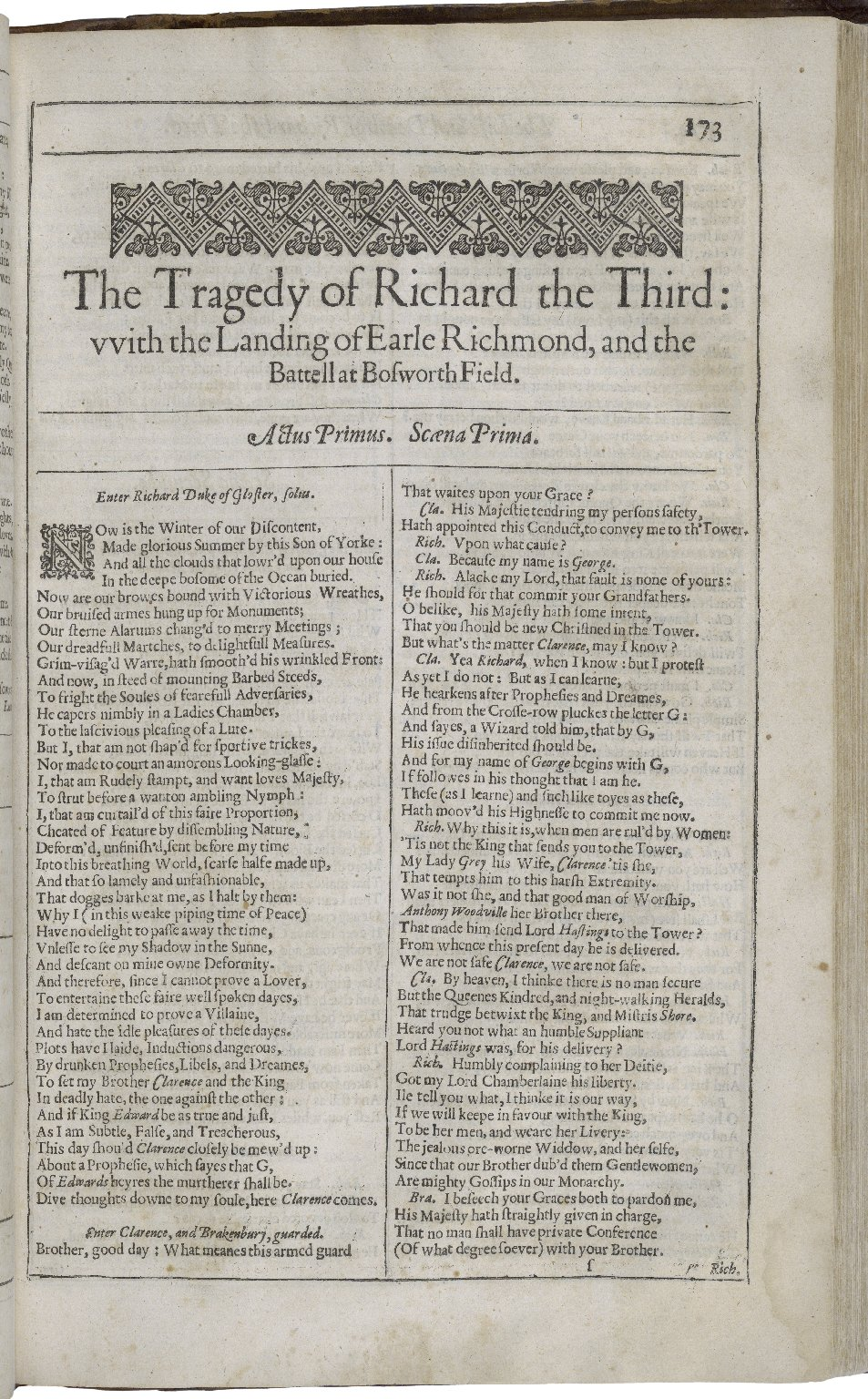
The first page of Richard III, printed in the Second Folio of 1632

Richard III is believed to be one of Shakespeare's earlier plays, preceded only by the three parts of Henry VI and perhaps Titus Andronicus and a handful of comedies. It is believed to have been written c. 1592–1594. Although Richard III was entered into the Register of the Stationers' Company on 20 October 1597 by the bookseller Andrew Wise, who published the first Quarto (Q1) later that year (with printing done by Valentine Simmes), Christopher Marlowe's Edward II, which cannot have been written much later than 1592 (Marlowe died in 1593), is thought to have been influenced by it. A second Quarto (Q2) followed in 1598, printed by Thomas Creede for Andrew Wise, containing an attribution to Shakespeare on its title page. Q3 appeared in 1602, Q4 in 1605, Q5 in 1612, and Q6 in 1622, the frequency attesting to its popularity. The First Folio version followed in 1623.

The Folio is longer than the Quarto and contains some fifty additional passages amounting to more than two hundred lines. However, the Quarto contains some twenty-seven passages amounting to about thirty-seven lines that are absent from the Folio. The two texts also contain hundreds of other differences, including the transposition of words within speeches, the movement of words from one speech to another, the replacement of words with near-synonyms, and many changes in grammar and spelling.

At one time, it was thought that the Quarto represented a separate revision of the play by Shakespeare. However, since the Quarto contains many changes that can only be regarded as mistakes, it is now widely believed that the Quarto was produced by memorial reconstruction. It is thought likely that the Quarto was collectively produced by a company of actors remembering their lines. It is unknown why the actors did this, but it may have been to replace a missing prompt book. The Folio is regarded as having much higher authority than the Quarto, but because the Folio edition was collated by the printers against a Quarto (probably Q3), some errors from the Quarto found their way into the Folio. Some parts of the Folio (the beginning of Act III and much of Act V) are clearly copied, with little change, direct from the Quarto. The Folio also has its own corruptions and omissions, and corrections have to be supplied, where possible, from the Quarto.

== Themes ==
=== Comedic elements ===
Unlike his previous tragedy Titus Andronicus, the play avoids graphic demonstrations of physical violence; only Richard and Clarence are shown being stabbed on-stage, while the rest (the two princes, Hastings, Brackenbury, Grey, Vaughan, Rivers, Anne, Buckingham, and King Edward) all meet their ends off-stage. Despite the villainous nature of the title character and the grim storyline, Shakespeare infuses the action with comic material, as he does with most of his tragedies. Much of the humour rises from the dichotomy between how Richard's character is known and how Richard tries to appear.

Richard himself also provides some dry remarks in evaluating the situation, as when he plans to marry Queen Elizabeth's daughter: "Murder her brothers, then marry her; Uncertain way of gain ..." Other examples of humour in this play include Clarence's reluctant murderers, and the Duke of Buckingham's report on his attempt to persuade the Londoners to accept Richard ("I bid them that did love their country's good cry, God save Richard, England's royal king!" Richard: "And did they so?" Buckingham: "No, so God help me, they spake not a word ...") Puns, a Shakespearean staple, are especially well represented in the scene where Richard tries to persuade Queen Elizabeth to woo her daughter on his behalf.

=== Free will and fatalism ===
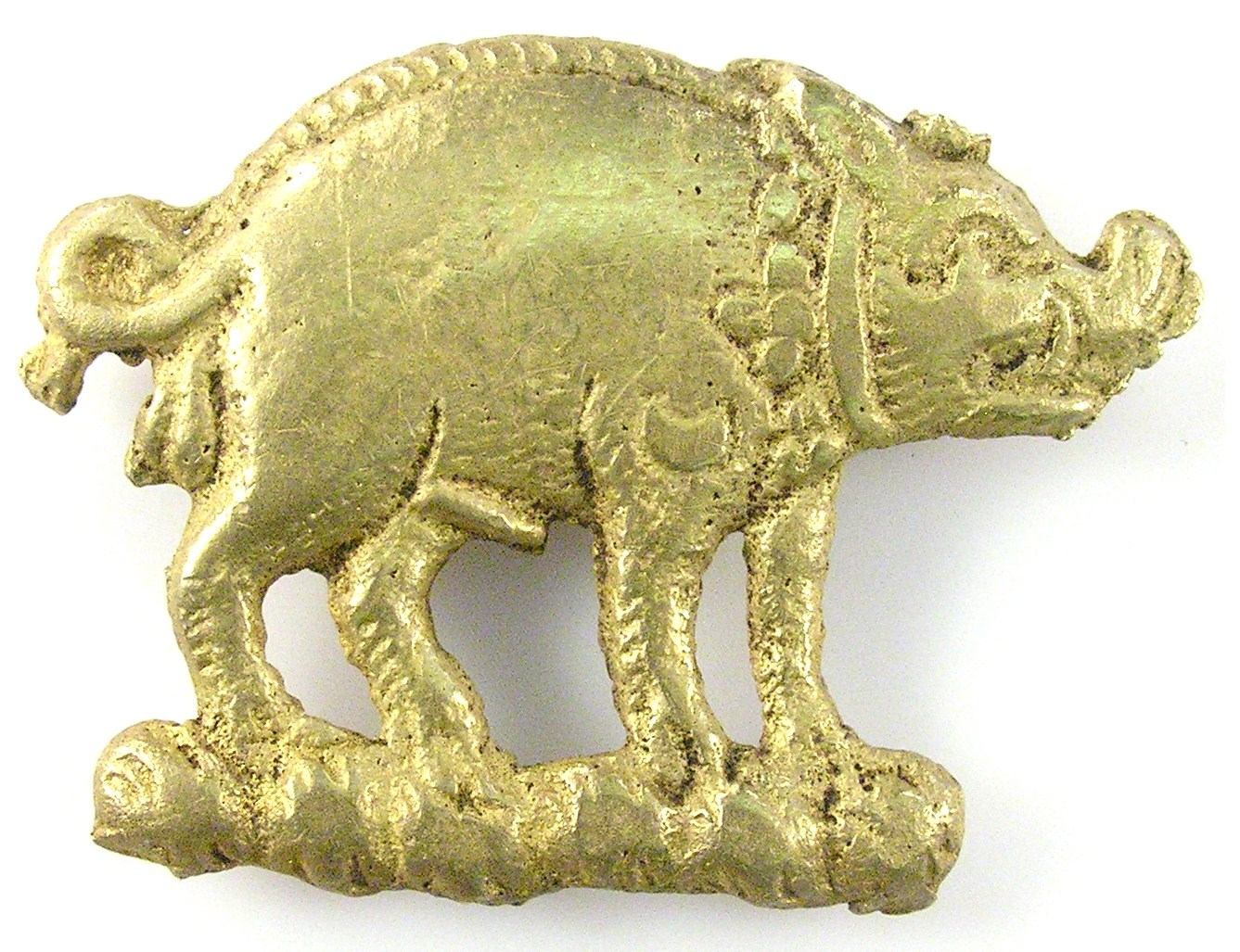
Queen Margaret: "Thou elvish-mark'd, abortive, rooting hog!" Act 1, Scene III. The white boar was Richard's personal symbol: Bronze boar mount thought to have been worn by a supporter of Richard III.

One of the central themes of Richard III is the idea of fate, especially as it is seen through the tension between free will and fatalism in Richard's actions and speech, as well as the reactions to him by other characters. There is no doubt that Shakespeare drew heavily on Sir Thomas More's account of Richard III as a criminal and tyrant as inspiration for his own rendering. This influence, especially as it relates to the role of divine punishment in Richard's rule of England, reaches its height in the voice of Margaret. Janis Lull suggests that "Margaret gives voice to the belief, encouraged by the growing Calvinism of the Elizabethan era, that individual historical events are determined by God, who often punishes evil with (apparent) evil".

Thus it seems possible that Shakespeare, in accordance with the growing "Tudor Myth" of the day, as well as taking into account new theologies of divine action and human will becoming popular in the wake of the Protestant Reformation, sought to paint Richard as the final curse of God on England in punishment for the deposition of Richard II in 1399. Irving Ribner argued that "the evil path of Richard is a cleansing operation which roots evil out of society and restores the world at last to the God-ordained goodness embodied in the new rule of Henry VII".

Scholar Victor Kiernan writes that this interpretation is a perfect fit with the English social perspective of Shakespeare's day: "An extension is in progress of a privileged class's assurance of preferential treatment in the next world as in this, to a favoured nation's conviction of having God on its side, of Englishmen being ... the new Chosen People".

However, historical fatalism is merely one side of the argument of fate versus free will. It is also possible that Shakespeare intended to portray Richard as "a personification of the Machiavellian view of history as power politics". In this view, Richard is acting entirely out of his own free will in brutally taking hold of the English throne. Kiernan also presents this side of the coin, noting that Richard "boasts to us of his finesse in dissembling and deception with bits of Scripture to cloak his 'naked villainy' (I.iii.334–348) ... Machiavelli, as Shakespeare may want us to realise, is not a safe guide to practical politics".

Kiernan suggests that Richard is merely acting as if God is determining his every step in a sort of Machiavellian manipulation of religion as an attempt to circumvent the moral conscience of those around him. Therefore, historical determinism is merely an illusion perpetrated by Richard's assertion of his own free will. The Machiavellian reading of the play finds evidence in Richard's interactions with the audience, as when he mentions that he is "determinèd to prove a villain" (I.i.30). However, though it seems Richard views himself as completely in control, Lull suggests that Shakespeare is using Richard to state "the tragic conception of the play in a joke. His primary meaning is that he controls his own destiny. His pun also has a second, contradictory meaning—that his villainy is predestined—and the strong providentialism of the play ultimately endorses this meaning".

=== Language ===
Literary critic Paul Haeffner writes that Shakespeare had a great understanding of language and the potential of every word he used. One word that Shakespeare gave potential to was "joy". This is employed in Act I, Scene III, where it is used to show "deliberate emotional effect". Another word that Haeffner points out is "kind", which he suggests is used with two different definitions. The first definition is used to express a "gentle and loving" man, which Clarence uses to describe his brother Richard to the murderers that were sent to kill him. This definition is not true, as Richard uses a gentle façade to seize the throne. The second definition concerns "the person's true nature ... Richard will indeed use Hastings kindly—that is, just as he is in the habit of using people—brutally".

Haeffner also writes about how speech is written. He compares the speeches of Richmond and Richard to their soldiers. He describes Richmond's speech as "dignified" and formal, while Richard's speech is explained as "slangy and impetuous". Richard's casualness in speech is also noted by another writer. However, Lull does not make the comparison between Richmond and Richard as Haeffner does, but between Richard and the women in his life. However, it is important to the women share the formal language that Richmond uses. She makes the argument that the difference in speech "reinforces the thematic division between the women's identification with the social group and Richard's individualism". Haeffner agrees that Richard is "an individualist, hating dignity and formality".

Janis Lull also takes special notice of the mourning women. She suggests that they are associated with "figures of repetition as anaphora—beginning each clause in a sequence with the same word—and epistrophe—repeating the same word at the end of each clause". One example of the epistrophe can be found in Margaret's speech in Act I, Scene III. Haeffner refers to these as few of many "devices and tricks of style" that occur in the play, showcasing Shakespeare's ability to bring out the potential of every word.

=== Richard as anti-hero ===
Throughout the play, Richard's character constantly changes and shifts and, in doing so, alters the dramatic structure of the story.

Richard immediately establishes a connection with the audience with his opening monologue. In the soliloquy he admits his amorality to the audience but at the same time treats them as if they were co-conspirators in his plotting; one may well be enamored of his rhetoric while being appalled by his actions. Richard shows off his wit in Act I, as seen in the interchanges with Lady Anne (Act I, Scene II) and his brother Clarence (Act I, Scene I). In his dialogues in Act I, Richard knowingly refers to thoughts he has only previously shared with the audience to keep the audience attuned to him and his objectives. In 1.1, Richard tells the audience in a soliloquy how he plans to claw his way to the throne—killing his brother Clarence as a necessary step to get there. However, Richard pretends to be Clarence's friend, falsely reassuring him by saying, "I will deliver you, or else lie for you" (1.1.115); which the audience knows—and Richard tells the audience after Clarence's exit—is the exact opposite of what he plans to do. Scholar Michael E. Mooney describes Richard as occupying a "figural position"; he is able to move in and out of it by talking with the audience on one level, and interacting with other characters on another.

Each scene in Act I is book-ended by Richard directly addressing the audience. This action on Richard's part not only keeps him in control of the dramatic action of the play, but also of how the audience sees him: in a somewhat positive light, or as the protagonist. Richard actually embodies the dramatic character of "Vice" from medieval morality plays—with which Shakespeare was very familiar from his time—with his "impish-to-fiendish humour". Like Vice, Richard is able to render what is ugly and evil—his thoughts and aims, his view of other characters—into what is charming and amusing for the audience.

In the earlier acts of the play, too, the role of the antagonist is filled by that of the old Lancastrian queen, Margaret, who is reviled by the Yorkists and whom Richard manipulates and condemns in Act I, Scene III.

However, after Act I, the number and quality of Richard's asides to the audience decrease significantly, as well as multiple scenes are interspersed that do not include Richard at all, but average Citizens (Act II, Scene III), or the Duchess of York and Clarence's children (Act II, Scene II), who are as moral as Richard is evil. Without Richard guiding the audience through the dramatic action, the audience is left to evaluate for itself what is going on. In Act IV, Scene IV, after the murder of the two young princes and the ruthless murder of Lady Anne, the women of the play—Queen Elizabeth, the Duchess of York, and even Margaret—gather to mourn their state and to curse Richard; and it is difficult as the audience not to sympathise with them. When Richard enters to bargain with Queen Elizabeth for her daughter's hand—a scene whose form echoes the same rhythmically quick dialogue as the Lady Anne scene in Act I—he has lost his vivacity and playfulness for communication; it is obvious he is not the same man.

By the end of Act IV everyone else in the play, including Richard's own mother, the Duchess, has turned against him. He does not interact with the audience nearly as much, and the inspiring quality of his speech has declined into merely giving and requiring information. As Richard gets closer to seizing the crown, he encloses himself within the world of the play; no longer embodying his facile movement in and out of the dramatic action, he is now stuck firmly within it. It is from Act IV that Richard really begins his rapid decline into truly being the antagonist. Shakespeare scholar Stephen Greenblatt notes how Richard even refers to himself as "the formal Vice, Iniquity" (3.1.82), which informs the audience that he knows what his function is; but also like Vice in the morality plays, the fates will turn and get Richard in the end, which Elizabethan audiences would have recognised.

In addition, the character of Richmond enters into the play in Act V to overthrow Richard and save the state from his tyranny, effectively being the instantaneous new protagonist. Richmond is a clear contrast to Richard's evil character, which makes the audience see him as such.

== Performance ==
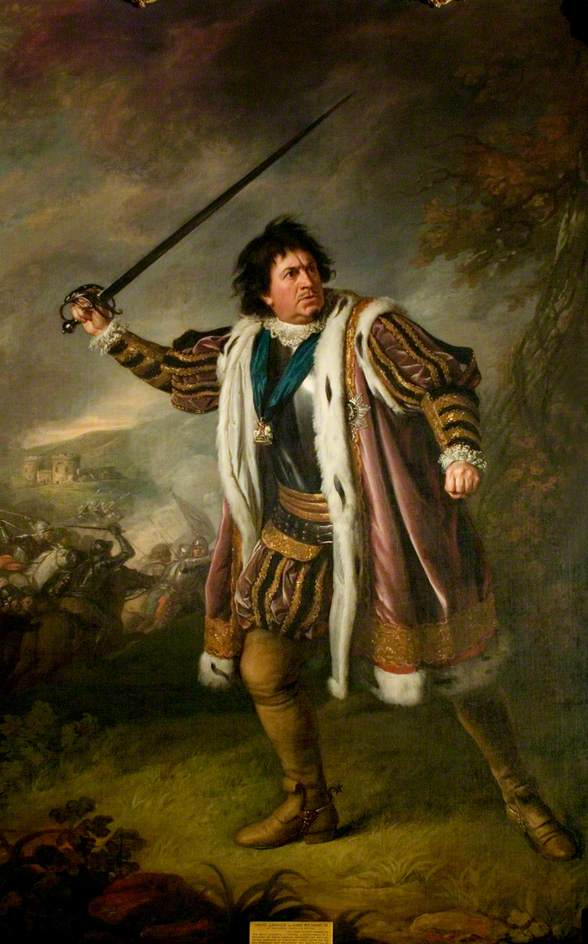
David Garrick as Richard III at Bosworth by Nathaniel Dance-Holland (1771)

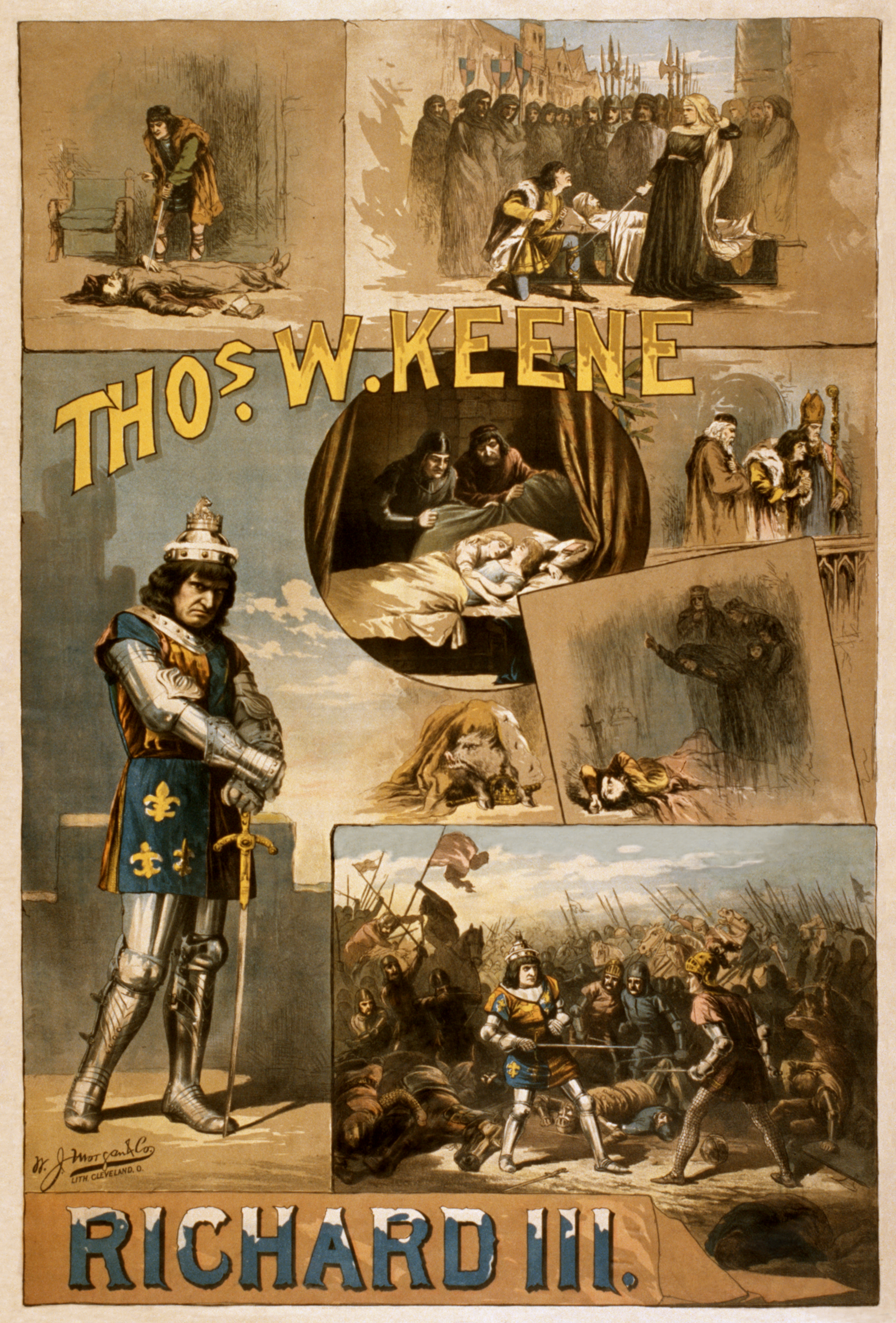
Poster, c. 1884, advertising an American production of the play, showing many key scenes

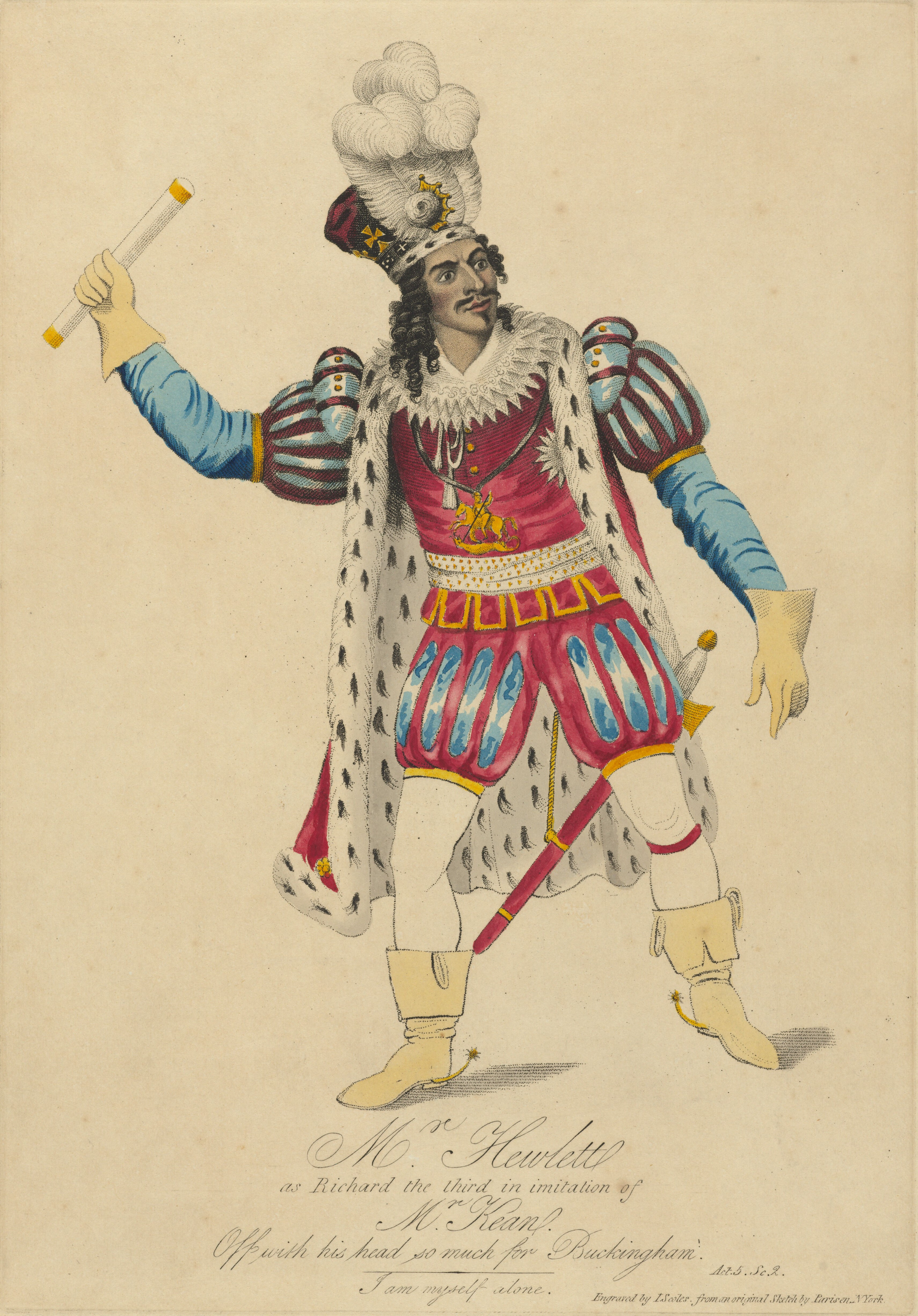
African-American James Hewlett as Richard III in a c. 1821 production. Below him is quoted the line "Off with his head; so much for Buckingham", a line not from the original play but from adaptations.

The earliest certain performance occurred on 16 or 17 November 1633, when Charles I and Queen Henrietta Maria watched it on the Queen's birthday.

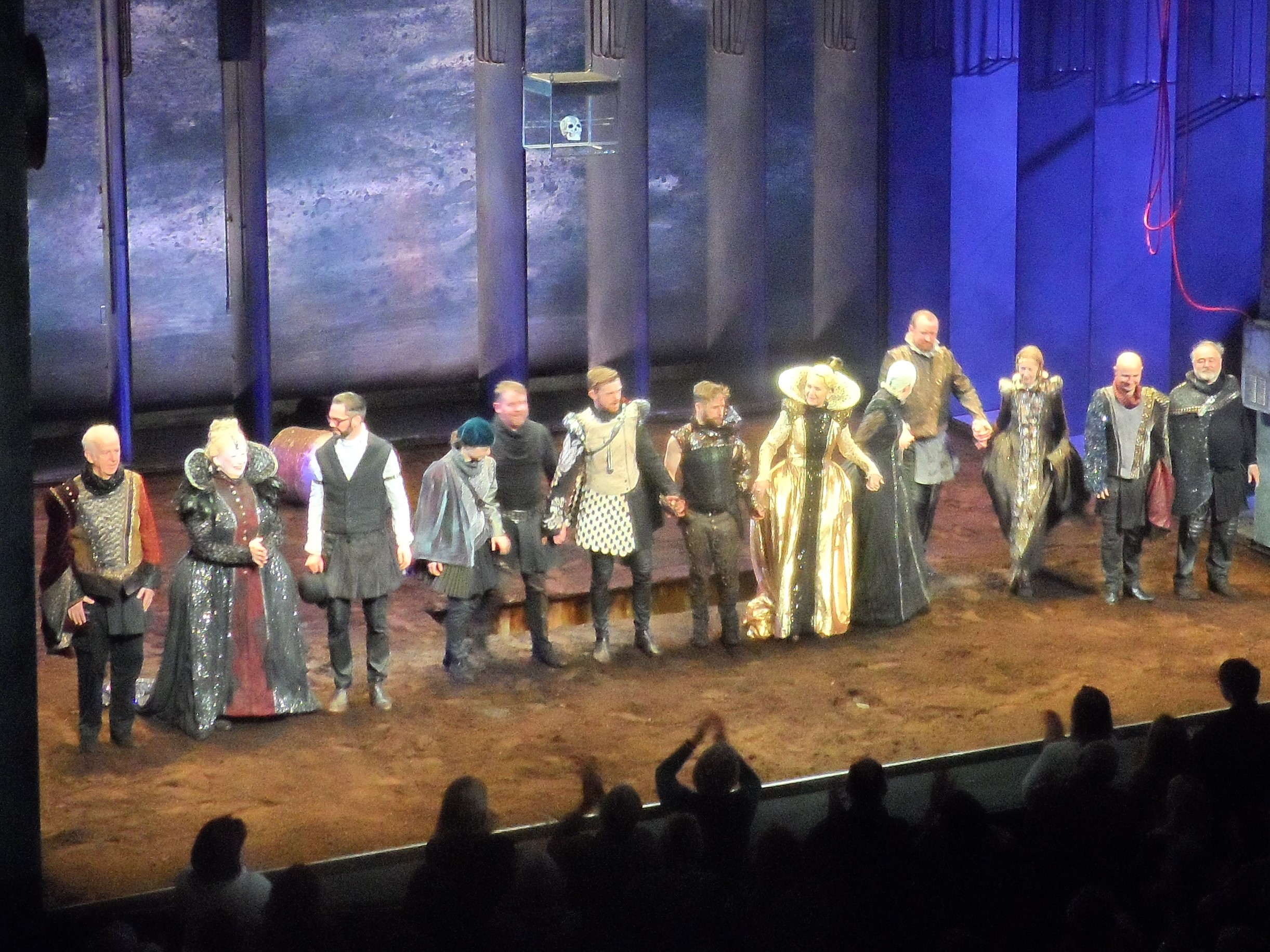
Cast of a 2018 production of Richard III at the Abbey Theatre

Colley Cibber produced the most successful of the Restoration adaptations of Shakespeare with his version of Richard III, at Drury Lane starting in 1700. Cibber himself played the role till 1739, and his version was on stage for the next century and a half. It contained the lines "Off with his head; so much for Buckingham" – possibly the most famous Shakespearean line that Shakespeare did not write – and "Richard's himself again!". The original Shakespearean version returned in a production at Sadler's Wells Theatre in 1845.

In 2011 controversial actor Kevin Spacey starred in an Old Vic production which subsequently toured the United States, directed by stage and film director Sam Mendes. Spacey had played the role of Richard's henchman, the Duke of Buckingham, in the Pacino film.

Richard III has been repeatedly adapted and reimagined for the stage. The Public Theater, in 2018, premiered Mike Lew's adaptation Teenage Dick which placed the titular character as a sixteen year old with cerebral palsy in pursuit of his high school's senior class presidency. In 2026, The Woke Tragedy of Richard III: Dyke of Gloucester premiered in New York City and followed a nonbinary lesbian Richard in a technofeudalist dystopian future New England.

== Adaptations ==
=== Film ===
Basil Rathbone played Richard III in the 1939 Universal horror film Tower of London, which was directed by Rowland V. Lee. The film was later remade by Roger Corman in 1962 with Vincent Price (who had played Clarence in Lee's film) in the lead role. While both films are influenced by the characterisation and structure of Shakespeare's play, neither includes any dialogue from it.

The most famous player of the part in recent times was Laurence Olivier in his 1955 film version. Olivier's film incorporates a few scenes and speeches from Shakespeare's Henry VI, Part 3 and Cibber's rewrite of Shakespeare's play, but cuts entirely the characters of Queen Margaret and the Duchess of York, and Richard's soliloquy after seeing the ghosts of his victims. Olivier has Richard seduce Lady Anne while mourning over the corpse of her husband rather than her father-in-law as in the play. Olivier's rendition has been parodied by many comedians, including Peter Cook and Peter Sellers. Sellers, who had aspirations to do the role straight, appeared in a 1965 TV special on the Beatles' music by reciting "A Hard Day's Night" in the style of Olivier's Richard III. The first episode of the BBC television comedy Blackadder in part parodies the Olivier film, visually (as in the crown motif), Peter Cook's performance as a benevolent Richard, and by mangling Shakespearean text ("Now is the summer of our sweet content made o'ercast winter by these Tudor clouds ...")

Richard Loncraine's 1995 film, starring Ian McKellen, is set in a fictional fascist England in the 1930s, and based on an earlier highly successful stage production. Only about half the text of the play is used. The first part of his "Now is the winter of our discontent..." soliloquy is a public speech, while the second part is a private monologue (at a urinal). The famous final line of Richard's "A horse, my kingdom for a horse" is spoken when his jeep becomes trapped after backing up into a large pile of rubble.

In 1996, Al Pacino made his directoral debut and played the title role in Looking for Richard, analysing the plot of the play and playing out several scenes from it, as well as conducting a broader examination of Shakespeare's continuing role and relevance in popular culture. Also in 1996, a pristine print of Richard III (1912), starring Frederick Warde in the title role, was discovered by a private collector and donated to the American Film Institute. The 55-minute film is considered to be the earliest surviving American feature film.

In the out-take interviews of the 1983 Brian De Palma classic Scarface, writer Oliver Stone indicated that his pre-script influences had included William Shakespeare's Richard III.

In 2002 the story of Richard III was re-told in a movie about gang culture called King Rikki (also known as The Street King).

In 2017, Italian director Roberta Torre realized a musical drama film, inspired by Shakespeare's play, named Bloody Richard.

=== Television ===
The BBC Television Shakespeare version, first broadcast in 1983, starred Ron Cook as Richard.

BBC Two aired a new adaptation of Richard III in 2016 as part of The Hollow Crown series, with Benedict Cumberbatch playing the king. Executive producer Pippa Harris commented, "By filming the Henry VI plays as well as Richard III, we will allow viewers to fully appreciate how such a monstrous tyrant could find his way to power, bringing even more weight and depth to this iconic character."

Richard III was adapted as part of the BBC's Shakespeare: The Animated Tales series, airing as part of series two in 1994.

== In culture ==
=== Now is the winter of our discontent ===
In The Return to Parnassus; the Scourge of Simony, one of the three Parnassus plays, which were written between 1598 and 1602 two characters, Philomusus and Studiosus, audition for Richard Burbage and Will Kemp, members of Shakespeare's company, the Lord Chamberlain's Men. The audition piece Philomusus performs is from the opening monologue of Richard III.

The 2010 film, The King's Speech, features a scene where the king's speech therapist Lionel Logue, as played by Geoffrey Rush, auditions for the role by reciting the lines, "Now is the winter of our discontent / Made glorious summer by this sun [or son] of York". Shakespeare critic Keith Jones believes that the film in general sets up its main character as a kind of antithesis to Richard III. The same antithesis was noted by conservative commentator Noah Millman.

In the Red Dwarf episode "Marooned", Rimmer objects to Lister's burning of the Complete Works of Shakespeare in an attempt to maintain enough heat to keep him alive. When challenged, Rimmer claims he can quote from it and embarks upon the soliloquy: "Now! ... That's all I can remember. You know! That famous speech from Richard III – 'now, something something something something'."

In the 1967 film Billion Dollar Brain, Harry Palmer is told to use the verse as a code phrase.

John Steinbeck used the opening line for the title of his novel The Winter of Our Discontent.

The phrase "Winter of Discontent" is an expression, popularised by the British media, referring to the winter of 1978–79 in the United Kingdom, during which there were widespread strikes by local authority trade unions demanding larger pay rises for their members.

=== My kingdom for a horse! ===
Richard begins act 5, scene 4 by exclaiming "A horse, a horse, my kingdom for a horse!" after being knocked from his steed during the climactic battle. The phrase illustrates the drama and desperation of his sudden fall from grace and has entered common parlance as such.

In the 1949 Looney Tunes cartoon A Ham in a Role, the dog actor says Catesby and Richard III's lines, "Rescue, fair lord, or else the day is lost! A horse, A horse, My kingdom for a horse!" before being kicked out of the window by a Goofy Gophers-hauled horse.

Noël Coward's 1941 song "Could You Please Oblige Us with a Bren Gun?" includes a lyric referring to Colonel Montmorency: "He realised his army should be mechanised, of course/ But somewhere inside/ Experience cried/ 'My kingdom for a horse!'"

In the 1993 Mel Brooks film Robin Hood: Men in Tights, the character Robin of Locksley, played by Cary Elwes, says "A horse, my kingdom for a horse!" as he arrives in England in the opening scene.

In E. T. A. Hoffmann's 1816 story "The Nutcracker and the Mouse King", the Nutcracker shouts in one scene; "A horse – a horse – my kingdom for a horse!"

=== Other quotations ===
The film Being John Malkovich has many Shakespeare allusions, including a scene in which Malkovich is shown rehearsing Richard III's lines "Was ever woman in this humour woo'd? / Was ever woman in this humour won?" where Richard is boasting about using power, lies, and crime to seduce Lady Anne. As Visual Cultures professor Lynn Turner notes, this scene anticipates a parallel scene in which Craig uses deceit to seduce Maxine through Malkovich. Mariangela Tempera has noted that the subservience of Lady Anne in the scene contrasts with the self-assertiveness of the actress playing Lady Anne as she seduces Malkovich offstage.

In Adam Sandler's 2011 film Jack and Jill, Al Pacino reprises his role as Richard III, although the scenes are modified as Pacino interacts with the audience in a heavily comedic way.

In V for Vendetta when V confronts Father Lilliman, he quotes the line "And thus I clothe my naked villany in old odd ends stol'n forth of holy writ, and seem a saint when most I play the devil."

In Freaked, an arrogant movie star who has been transformed into a "hideous mutant freak" makes use of his deformity by performing the opening soliloquy, condensed by a local professor in subtitles for the "culturally illiterate" to the more succinct "I'm ugly. I never get laid." One reviewer mentioned this as the best example of how the film seamlessly moves between highbrow and lowbrow culture.

In The Goodbye Girl, an ambitious actor played by Richard Dreyfuss is forced by his off-Broadway producer to play Richard III as a caricature of a homosexual.

In the 1975 film L'important c'est d'aimer, directed by Andrzej Żuławski, a production of Richard III in French is a mise en abyme for the drama enveloping the characters in the film.

The manga Requiem of the Rose King by Aya Kanno, which began in 2013, is a loose adaptation of the first Shakespearean historical tetralogy. It depicts Richard III as intersex instead of hunchbacked.

The title of the Alistair MacLean film Where Eagles Dare is inspired by Richard's complaint that the "world is grown so bad, that wrens make prey where eagles dare not perch." (Quoted in Act I, Scene III)

==== Lincoln's assassination ====
US President Abraham Lincoln was renowned for his love of Shakespeare, and of Richard III in particular. This was used in Confederate propaganda, especially in Virginia, where residents of Richmond viewed Lincoln as a tyrant akin to the Shakespearean Richard and identified their fledgling state's capital city with the play's hero, the Earl of Richmond. Some interpreted Richard's Act IV speech as an omen favourable to the South:

a bard of Ireland told me once
I should not live long after I saw Richmond.

Within a fortnight of the president's visit to the defeated city, he was assassinated by John Wilkes Booth, a Shakespearean actor known for playing both Richard and Richmond. Booth's notorious final words from the stage were "Sic semper tyrannis".

== Historical inaccuracy ==
Shakespeare, and the Tudor chroniclers who influenced him, had an interest in portraying the defeat of the Plantagenet House of York by the House of Tudor as good conquering evil. Loyalty to the new regime required that the last Plantagenet king, Richard III, be depicted as a villain. The historical inaccuracies in the play can be attributed partly to Shakespeare's sources, such as Holinshed's Chronicles, the writings of John Rous, Polydore Vergil and Thomas More, and partly to artistic licence. Some of these inaccuracies are listed below in the order in which they either appear or are referred to in the play.

There is no evidence to suggest that Richard was personally responsible for the death of his wife's first husband, Edward of Westminster (the son of Henry VI), nor that of her father, the Earl of Warwick (and in Henry VI, Part 3 Richard is not portrayed as being responsible for Warwick's death). Richard, then eighteen, took part in the battles in which Edward and Warwick were killed. Not all of Shakespeare's sources identify Richard as being involved in the death of Henry VI, who may have been murdered on the orders of Edward IV, although Thomas More clearly states that Richard committed the murder without the king's "commaundemente or knoweledge". Richard and his wife, Anne Neville, had known each other for a long time before they married, having spent much of their childhood in the same household. Henry VI's widow, Queen Margaret, was not at court in the period covered by this play; she became Edward IV's prisoner and returned to France in 1475. Richard's elder brother, Clarence (George, Duke of Clarence), was not on good terms with Richard, but was imprisoned by Edward IV and was executed for treason in 1478, when Richard was in the North of England, where he continued to live until Edward IV died five years later.

Richard returned from the North to fulfil Edward IV's wish that he rule as Lord Protector. It was the Plantagenet tradition that a future king (in this case Edward V, the elder of the "princes in the tower") would stay in the royal apartments at the Tower of London while awaiting his coronation. No one knows why the "princes in the tower" disappeared or what happened to them. Richard took the throne by an Act of Parliament, on the basis of testimony claiming that Edward IV's marriage to Queen Elizabeth (Elizabeth Woodville) had been bigamous. Contemporary rumours that Richard had murdered his own wife appear baseless; she is thought to have died of tuberculosis. There is no surviving evidence to suggest that he planned to marry his niece, Elizabeth of York, although rumours about this plan did circulate. At the time he was also negotiating a marriage for Elizabeth with a Portuguese prince, Manuel, Duke of Beja (later Manuel I of Portugal).

At the Battle of Bosworth there was no single combat between Richard and Richmond (Henry Tudor). Richard spotted Richmond in his rearguard surrounded by French pikemen and led a cavalry charge against him. Richard was steered away from Richmond by Sir Rhys ap Thomas. The Stanleys (Thomas, Lord Stanley, and his younger brother, Sir William Stanley) entered the fray in support of Richmond when they saw that Richard was vulnerable; when he saw this, Richard cried "Treason". Richard fell from his horse after it lost its footing in a marshy area; he was offered a new horse but declined.

The only contemporary reference to Richard having any deformities was the observation that his right shoulder was slightly higher than his left, which is now known to have been caused by his scoliosis of the spine. After the discovery of Richard's remains in 2012 it became clear that he might have been slightly hunched, though the degree and direction of the curvature was not as serious as that of what is now known as spinal kyphosis.

== Editions of Richard III ==
- Bate, Jonathan and Rasmussen, Eric (eds.) Richard III (The RSC Shakespeare; London: Macmillan, 2008)
- Davison, Peter (ed.) The First Quarto of King Richard III (The New Cambridge Shakespeare; Cambridge: Cambridge University Press, 1996)
- de Somogyi, Nick (ed.) Richard III: The Tragedy of Richard the Third (The Shakespeare Folios; London: Nick Hern Books, 2002)
- Dover Wilson, John (ed.) Richard III (The New Shakespeare; Cambridge: Cambridge University Press, 1954; revised edition 1961)
- Eccles, Mark (ed.) The Tragedy of King Richard III (Signet Classic Shakespeare; New York: Signet, 1964; revised edition, 1988; 2nd revised edition 1998)
- Evans, G. Blakemore (ed.) Richard III (The Pelican Shakespeare; London: Penguin, 1959; revised edition 1969)
- ———. The Riverside Shakespeare (Boston: Houghton Mifflin, 1974; 2nd edn., 1997)
- Greenblatt, Stephen; Cohen, Walter; Howard, Jean E. and Maus, Katharine Eisaman (eds.) The Norton Shakespeare: Based on the Oxford Shakespeare (London: Norton, 1997)
- Greg, W.W. (ed.) Richard III, 1597 (Oxford: Oxford University Press, 1959)
- Hammond, Anthony (ed.) King Richard III (The Arden Shakespeare, 2nd Series; London: Arden, 1981)
- Holland, Peter (ed.) Richard III (The Pelican Shakespeare, 2nd edition; London: Penguin, 2000)
- Honigmann, E.A.J. (ed.) Richard III (The New Penguin Shakespeare; London: Penguin, 1968; revised edition, 1995)
- Jowett, John (ed.) Richard III (The Oxford Shakespeare; Oxford: Oxford University Press, 2000)
- Lull, Janis (ed.) King Richard III (The New Cambridge Shakespeare; Cambridge: Cambridge University Press, 1999; 2nd edition 2009)
- Siemon, James R. (ed.) King Richard III (The Arden Shakespeare, 3rd Series; London: Arden, 2009)
- Taylor, Michael (ed.) Richard III (The New Penguin Shakespeare, 2nd edition; London: Penguin, 2005)
- Thompson, A. Hamilton (ed.) The Tragedy of King Richard the Third (The Arden Shakespeare, 1st Series; London: Arden, 1907)
- Wells, Stanley; Taylor, Gary; Jowett, John and Montgomery, William (eds.) The Oxford Shakespeare: The Complete Works (Oxford: Oxford University Press, 1986; 2nd edn., 2005)
- Werstine, Paul and Mowat, Barbara A. (eds.) Richard III (Folger Shakespeare Library; Washington: Simon & Schuster, 2004)

== See also ==
- List of idioms attributed to Shakespeare
