= Grade II* listed buildings in Stratford-on-Avon (district) =

There are over 20,000 Grade II* listed buildings in England. This page is a list of these buildings in the district of Stratford-on-Avon in Warwickshire.

== Stratford-on-Avon ==
| Name | Location | Type | Completed (Note: The date given is the date used by Historic England as significant for the initial building or that of an important part in the structure's description.) | Date designated | Grid ref. (Note: The grid reference is based on the British national grid reference system, sometimes known as OSGB36, used by the Ordnance Survey.) Geo-coordinates | Entry number (Note: The "List Entry Number" is a unique number assigned to each listed building and scheduled monument by Historic England.) | Image |
|---|---|---|---|---|---|---|---|
| Admington Hall | Admington, Stratford-on-Avon | Country House | 17th century construction | 6 February 1952 | SP1979445710; 52°06′34″N 1°42′45″W | 1382509 | Admington Hall More images |
| Church of St Nicholas | Alcester, Stratford-on-Avon | Church | 13th century | 1 February 1967 | SP0905257471; 52°12′55″N 1°52′08″W | 1200612 | Church of St Nicholas More images |
| Churchill House | Alcester, Stratford-on-Avon | House | 1967 | 1 February 1967 | SP0905157524; 52°12′57″N 1°52′08″W | 1355383 | Churchill House More images |
| 9 and 9a High Street | Alcester, Stratford-on-Avon | Inn | Late 16th century | 1 February 1967 | SP0899257447; 52°12′55″N 1°52′11″W | 1200765 | Upload Photo |
| 5 and 7 Malt Mill Lane | Alcester, Stratford-on-Avon | House | c1972-1975 | 11 December 1969 | SP0908657407; 52°12′53″N 1°52′06″W | 1024625 | Upload Photo |
| 2 Malt Mill Lane | Alcester, Stratford-on-Avon | Apartments | 1985 | 11 December 1969 | SP0909157432; 52°12′54″N 1°52′06″W | 1183451 | Upload Photo |
| Church of St Mary and the Holy Cross | Alderminster, Stratford-on-Avon | Church | 12th century nave | 5 April 1967 | SP2300048630; 52°08′08″N 1°39′55″W | 1382532 | Church of St Mary and the Holy Cross More images |
| Ragley Hall, Principal Entrance Lodge (north) | Arrow with Weethley, Stratford-on-Avon | Gate Lodge | c. 1795 | 1 February 1967 | SP0793256253; 52°12′16″N 1°53′07″W | 1024694 | Ragley Hall, Principal Entrance Lodge (north) |
| Ragley Hall, Principal Entrance Lodge (south) | Arrow with Weethley, Stratford-on-Avon | Gate Lodge | c. 1785 | 1 February 1967 | SP0793056234; 52°12′15″N 1°53′07″W | 1024695 | Ragley Hall, Principal Entrance Lodge (south) |
| Ragley Hall, Stable Block | Arrow with Weethley, Stratford-on-Avon | Stable | Mid 18th century | 1 February 1967 | SP0719655648; 52°11′56″N 1°53′46″W | 1024692 | Ragley Hall, Stable Block More images |
| Aqueduct, Stratford on Avon Canal (that part in Aston Cantlow CP) | Stratford on Avon Canal, Aston Cantlow, Stratford-on-Avon | Aqueduct | Late C18/early 19th century | 23 October 1985 | SP1620260907; 52°14′46″N 1°45′51″W | 1024550 | Aqueduct, Stratford on Avon Canal (that part in Aston Cantlow CP) More images |
| Guild Rooms & the Porch | Aston Cantlow, Stratford-on-Avon | Apartment | 1960 | 1 February 1967 | SP1387959912; 52°14′14″N 1°47′53″W | 1300206 | Guild Rooms & the Porch More images |
| Shelfield House | Shelfield, Aston Cantlow, Stratford-on-Avon | House | c. 1700 | 1 February 1967 | SP1200062000; 52°15′22″N 1°49′32″W | 1184711 | Upload Photo |
| Church of St John the Baptist | Avon Dassett, Stratford-on-Avon | Church | c. 1300 | 30 May 1967 | SP4114950213; 52°08′55″N 1°24′00″W | 1024250 | Church of St John the Baptist More images |
| Dassett Field Farmhouse and attached Walls | Avon Dassett, Stratford-on-Avon | Farmhouse | Early 18th century | 13 September 1974 | SP4228049918; 52°08′45″N 1°23′01″W | 1024247 | Upload Photo |
| Church of St Martin | Barcheston, Stratford-on-Avon | Church | C12/early 13th century | 13 October 1966 | SP2648939944; 52°03′26″N 1°36′54″W | 1024407 | Church of St Martin More images |
| Barton House | Barton-on-the-Heath, Stratford-on-Avon | Manor House | Late 16th century | 2 September 1952 | SP2561132623; 51°59′29″N 1°37′42″W | 1024306 | Upload Photo |
| Church of St Lawrence | Barton-on-the-Heath, Stratford-on-Avon | Church | Early 12th century | 13 October 1966 | SP2560632523; 51°59′26″N 1°37′43″W | 1024311 | Church of St Lawrence More images |
| Old Falcon Inn | Bidford-on-Avon, Stratford-on-Avon | Inn | Mid and late 16th century | 1 February 1967 | SP1008851913; 52°09′55″N 1°51′14″W | 1355315 | Old Falcon Inn More images |
| Billesley Manor Hotel | Billesley, Stratford-on-Avon | Manor House | c1610-1620 | 6 February 1952 | SP1463456780; 52°12′33″N 1°47′14″W | 1382696 | Billesley Manor Hotel More images |
| The Cottage | Bishop's Itchington, Stratford-on-Avon | House | 1888 | 15 March 1983 | SP3898958050; 52°13′09″N 1°25′51″W | 1035650 | Upload Photo |
| Old Rectory Farmhouse and attached Roman Catholic Chapel of Saint Peter and Saint Paul | Lower Brailes, Brailes, Stratford-on-Avon | Farmhouse | late C16/early 17th century | 3 October 1966 | SP3168939289; 52°03′04″N 1°32′21″W | 1024377 | Old Rectory Farmhouse and attached Roman Catholic Chapel of Saint Peter and Saint Paul More images |
| Burmington Manor | Burmington, Stratford-on-Avon | Manor House | Early 13th century | 13 October 1966 | SP2633837931; 52°02′21″N 1°37′03″W | 1355575 | Upload Photo |
| Church of Saints Peter and Paul | Butlers Marston, Stratford-on-Avon | Church | 12th century | 13 October 1966 | SP3205849949; 52°08′49″N 1°31′59″W | 1035541 | Church of Saints Peter and Paul More images |
| Church of All Saints | Chadshunt, Stratford-on-Avon | Church | Mid 12th century | 30 May 1967 | SP3493453024; 52°10′28″N 1°29′26″W | 1035627 | Church of All Saints More images |
| Charlecote Mill (that part in Hampton Lucy CP) | Charlecote, Stratford-on-Avon | Watermill | Mid to late 18th century | 28 October 1999 | SP2590357216; 52°12′45″N 1°37′20″W | 1382109 | Charlecote Mill (that part in Hampton Lucy CP) More images |
| Lead Statue of Shepherd to North Side of Forecourt | Charlecote, Stratford-on-Avon | Statue | 1718 | 18 March 1997 | SP2597056437; 52°12′20″N 1°37′17″W | 1381803 | Lead Statue of Shepherd to North Side of Forecourt |
| Lead Statue of Shepherdess to North Side of Forecourt | Charlecote, Stratford-on-Avon | Statue | 1718 | 18 March 1997 | SP2596856436; 52°12′20″N 1°37′17″W | 1381804 | Lead Statue of Shepherdess to North Side of Forecourt More images |
| North Forecourt Wall with Two Gates and Gate Piers and Return to Gatehouse | Charlecote, Stratford-on-Avon | Balustrade | Late 19th century | 18 March 1997 | SP2595356438; 52°12′20″N 1°37′18″W | 1381802 | Upload Photo |
| South Forecourt Wall, Gates, Piers and North and South Returns and Coach House | Charlecote, Stratford-on-Avon | Gate | 1722 | 18 March 1997 | SP2597156396; 52°12′19″N 1°37′17″W | 1381805 | Upload Photo |
| Church of St Giles | Chesterton, Chesterton and Kingston, Stratford-on-Avon | Church | 12th century | 30 May 1967 | SP3571158240; 52°13′16″N 1°28′43″W | 1364715 | Church of St Giles More images |
| Gateway approx. 25 Metres North of Tower of Church of St Giles | Chesterton, Chesterton and Kingston, Stratford-on-Avon | Gate | 1630s | 7 January 1952 | SP3567258258; 52°13′17″N 1°28′45″W | 1184709 | Gateway approx. 25 Metres North of Tower of Church of St Giles More images |
| Church of St Michael and All Angels | Claverdon, Stratford-on-Avon | Church | c. 1350 | 5 April 1967 | SP1983164577; 52°16′44″N 1°42′39″W | 1382061 | Church of St Michael and All Angels More images |
| Yarningale Aqueduct (that part in Claverdon CP) | Claverdon, Stratford-on-Avon | Aqueduct | 1834 | 4 January 1990 | SP1839366381; 52°17′43″N 1°43′54″W | 1382094 | Yarningale Aqueduct (that part in Claverdon CP) More images |
| Church of St Helen | Clifford Chambers and Milcote, Stratford-on-Avon | Church | Mid 12th century construction | 5 April 1967 | SP1982652118; 52°10′01″N 1°42′42″W | 1382560 | Church of St Helen More images |
| Clifford Manor | Clifford Chambers and Milcote, Stratford-on-Avon | Manor House | Medieval | 6 February 1952 | SP1994851962; 52°09′56″N 1°42′35″W | 1382563 | Clifford Manor More images |
| The Old Rectory | Clifford Chambers and Milcote, Stratford-on-Avon | House | 1997 | 6 February 1952 | SP1984952094; 52°10′00″N 1°42′40″W | 1382569 | The Old Rectory More images |
| Bridge carrying Drive to Compton Verney House over Compton Pool | Compton Verney House, Compton Verney, Stratford-on-Avon | Bridge | 18th century | 6 February 1952 | SP3126952894; 52°10′24″N 1°32′39″W | 1381871 | Bridge carrying Drive to Compton Verney House over Compton Pool More images |
| South Entrance Gateway to Compton Verney House | Compton Verney House, Compton Verney, Stratford-on-Avon | Gate | 18th century | 2 August 1972 | SP3133152522; 52°10′12″N 1°32′36″W | 1381869 | Upload Photo |
| Stable Block immediately North East of Compton Verney House | Compton Verney House, Compton Verney, Stratford-on-Avon | Apartment | Altered late C20 | 5 April 1967 | SP3108752895; 52°10′24″N 1°32′49″W | 1381870 | Stable Block immediately North East of Compton Verney House More images |
| Coughton Court Stables (Coughton Art Galleries) | Coughton, Stratford-on-Avon | House | 1967 | 1 February 1967 | SP0831860651; 52°14′38″N 1°52′47″W | 1355379 | Coughton Court Stables (Coughton Art Galleries) More images |
| Roman Catholic Church of Saint Peter Paul and Elizabeth | Coughton, Stratford-on-Avon | Roman Catholic Church | 1853 | 11 December 1969 | SP0836360403; 52°14′30″N 1°52′44″W | 1355381 | Roman Catholic Church of Saint Peter Paul and Elizabeth More images |
| Church of St Peter | Dorsington, Stratford-on-Avon | Church | Pre 1754 | 5 April 1967 | SP1325449708; 52°08′44″N 1°48′28″W | 1382736 | Church of St Peter More images |
| Friends' Meeting House | Ettington, Stratford-on-Avon | Friends Meeting House | 1684-1689 | 6 February 1952 | SP2676948702; 52°08′10″N 1°36′37″W | 1382580 | Friends' Meeting House More images |
| Thornton Manor | Ettington, Stratford-on-Avon | Farmhouse | Mid 16th century | 5 April 1967 | SP2743950341; 52°09′02″N 1°36′01″W | 1382591 | Upload Photo |
| Church of St Botolph | Farnborough, Stratford-on-Avon | Church | 12th century | 30 May 1967 | SP4338049572; 52°08′34″N 1°22′03″W | 1299775 | Church of St Botolph More images |
| Farnborough Hall, the Oval Pavilion | Farnborough, Stratford-on-Avon | Loggia | c. 1750 | 7 January 1952 | SP4299848830; 52°08′10″N 1°22′23″W | 1024463 | Farnborough Hall, the Oval Pavilion More images |
| Farnborough Hall, The Game Larder | Farnborough, Stratford-on-Avon | Game Larder | c. 1750 | 21 April 1986 | SP4317449290; 52°08′25″N 1°22′14″W | 1374967 | Farnborough Hall, The Game Larder More images |
| Farnborough Hall, The Ionic Temple | Farnborough, Stratford-on-Avon | Temple | c. 1750 | 30 May 1967 | SP4308349066; 52°08′18″N 1°22′19″W | 1299780 | Farnborough Hall, The Ionic Temple More images |
| Church of St Peter and St Clare | Fenny Compton, Stratford-on-Avon | Church | Late 13th century | 30 May 1967 | SP4169952119; 52°09′57″N 1°23′30″W | 1355534 | Church of St Peter and St Clare More images |
| Woad House | Fenny Compton, Stratford-on-Avon | House | 14th century | 30 May 1967 | SP4155652242; 52°10′01″N 1°23′38″W | 1024223 | Upload Photo |
| Church of St Mary | Halford, Stratford-on-Avon | Church | 12th century | 13 October 1966 | SP2588145615; 52°06′30″N 1°37′25″W | 1185710 | Church of St Mary More images |
| Hampton Lucy House | Hampton Lucy, Stratford-on-Avon | House | 1999 | 6 February 1952 | SP2561556941; 52°12′36″N 1°37′36″W | 1382124 | Upload Photo |
| Church of St Mary and All Saints | Haselor, Stratford-on-Avon | Church | 12th century | 1 February 1967 | SP1238057892; 52°13′09″N 1°49′13″W | 1024525 | Church of St Mary and All Saints More images |
| Barclays Bank including Front Railings | Henley-in-Arden, Stratford-on-Avon | Vicarage | Late C17/early 18th century | 6 February 1952 | SP1510765997; 52°17′31″N 1°46′48″W | 1382334 | Barclays Bank including Front Railings More images |
| Brook House | Henley-in-Arden, Stratford-on-Avon | Timber Framed House | 16th century | 6 February 1952 | SP1521266390; 52°17′44″N 1°46′42″W | 1382286 | Upload Photo |
| St Loes | Henley-in-Arden, Stratford-on-Avon | Jettied House | C15/C16 | 6 February 1952 | SP1518166297; 52°17′41″N 1°46′44″W | 1382299 | St Loes |
| The White Swan Hotel | Henley-in-Arden, Stratford-on-Avon | House | Early 17th century refronting | 6 February 1952 | SP1507366041; 52°17′32″N 1°46′50″W | 1382311 | The White Swan Hotel More images |
| Church of Saint James the Great | Idlicote, Stratford-on-Avon | Church | C13-C14 | 13 October 1966 | SP2826344177; 52°05′43″N 1°35′20″W | 1024344 | Church of Saint James the Great More images |
| Foxcote House and Archways | Foxcote, Ilmington, Stratford-on-Avon | Manor House | Early 18th century | 2 September 1952 | SP1993441832; 52°04′28″N 1°42′38″W | 1024118 | Foxcote House and Archways More images |
| Ilmington Manor and attached Barn | Ilmington, Stratford-on-Avon | House | C20 | 2 September 1952 | SP2113243524; 52°05′23″N 1°41′35″W | 1185388 | Ilmington Manor and attached Barn More images |
| Stonecrop including Garden and Forecourt Walling and Pond | Ilmington, Stratford-on-Avon | House | 1955 | 27 March 2007 | SP1991043095; 52°05′09″N 1°42′39″W | 1391921 | Upload Photo |
| 1, 2, 3, 4 (the Old Cottage Bakery) and 6, Market Square | Kineton, Stratford-on-Avon | Row | 1671 | 5 April 1967 | SP3361351209; 52°09′29″N 1°30′36″W | 1381903 | Upload Photo |
| Church of St Peter | Kineton, Stratford-on-Avon | Church | Mid 13th century to 15th century | 5 April 1967 | SP3357151080; 52°09′25″N 1°30′39″W | 1381924 | Church of St Peter More images |
| Church of St Mary the Virgin | Kinwarton, Stratford-on-Avon | Church | 12th century | 1 February 1967 | SP1052358373; 52°13′24″N 1°50′51″W | 1183766 | Church of St Mary the Virgin More images |
| Church of St Denis | Little Compton, Stratford-on-Avon | Church | 12th century | 13 October 1966 | SP2616930290; 51°58′14″N 1°37′14″W | 1355522 | Church of St Denis More images |
| Little Compton Manor House and attached Wall | Little Compton, Stratford-on-Avon | Manor House | Early 16th century | 2 September 1952 | SP2614530296; 51°58′14″N 1°37′15″W | 1116486 | Little Compton Manor House and attached Wall More images |
| Little Wolford Manor House and attached Bakehouse and Gateway | Little Wolford, Stratford-on-Avon | House | 17th century | 2 September 1952 | SP2622235262; 52°00′55″N 1°37′10″W | 1319952 | Little Wolford Manor House and attached Bakehouse and Gateway More images |
| Church of the Holy Trinity | Long Itchington, Stratford-on-Avon | Church | late C12/early 13th century | 30 May 1967 | SP4119365122; 52°16′58″N 1°23′51″W | 1185674 | Church of the Holy Trinity More images |
| Tudor House | Long Itchington, Stratford-on-Avon | Jettied House | mid/late 16th century | 7 January 1952 | SP4155065190; 52°17′00″N 1°23′32″W | 1185708 | Tudor House More images |
| White Hall Farmhouse | Long Itchington, Stratford-on-Avon | Farmhouse | C15/early 16th century | 7 January 1952 | SP4049865374; 52°17′06″N 1°24′28″W | 1364758 | Upload Photo |
| The Goodwins | Long Marston, Stratford-on-Avon | House | C16/C17 | 6 February 1952 | SP1564148654; 52°08′09″N 1°46′22″W | 1382619 | Upload Photo |
| Gorcott Hall | Gorcott Hill, Mappleborough Green, Stratford-on-Avon | Country House | 15th century | 1 February 1967 | SP0882468214; 52°18′43″N 1°52′19″W | 1024486 | Upload Photo |
| Church of the Holy Cross | Moreton Morrell, Stratford-on-Avon | Church | 12th century | 5 April 1967 | SP3105555612; 52°11′52″N 1°32′49″W | 1381945 | Church of the Holy Cross More images |
| Church of the Holy Trinity | Morton Bagot, Stratford-on-Avon | Church | Late 13th century | 1 February 1967 | SP1126564707; 52°16′49″N 1°50′11″W | 1355449 | Church of the Holy Trinity More images |
| Greenhill Farmhouse | Morton Bagot, Stratford-on-Avon | Farmhouse | Late 15th century | 1 February 1967 | SP1103463641; 52°16′15″N 1°50′23″W | 1024499 | Upload Photo |
| Church of St Lawrence | Napton on the Hill, Stratford-on-Avon | Church | c. 1200 | 30 May 1967 | SP4630961281; 52°14′52″N 1°19′23″W | 1024444 | Church of St Lawrence More images |
| Church of St George | Newbold Pacey, Stratford-on-Avon | Church | 11th century | 5 April 1967 | SP2989157138; 52°12′42″N 1°33′50″W | 1381966 | Church of St George More images |
| Grave of Myrtilla approx. 3 Metres South of Chancel of Church of St Lawrence | Oxhill, Stratford-on-Avon | Gravestone | 1706 | 23 February 1988 | SP3170145510; 52°06′25″N 1°32′19″W | 1035552 | Grave of Myrtilla approx. 3 Metres South of Chancel of Church of St Lawrence |
| Church of St Mary the Virgin | Pillerton Hersey, Stratford-on-Avon | Church | Mid 13th century | 13 October 1966 | SP2989748861; 52°08′14″N 1°33′53″W | 1364769 | Church of St Mary the Virgin More images |
| Church of All Saints | Preston Bagot, Stratford-on-Avon | Church | 12th century | 5 April 1967 | SP1746266062; 52°17′33″N 1°44′43″W | 1382153 | Church of All Saints More images |
| The Gables | Preston on Stour, Stratford-on-Avon | House | 19th-century additions | 6 February 1952 | SP2051049907; 52°08′49″N 1°42′06″W | 1382650 | Upload Photo |
| 46, 47 and 48 | Preston on Stour, Stratford-on-Avon | House | 18th century extension | 6 February 1952 | SP2038250016; 52°08′53″N 1°42′13″W | 1382637 | 46, 47 and 48 |
| Church of St Mary | Priors Hardwick, Stratford-on-Avon | Church | Late 13th century | 30 May 1967 | SP4717156193; 52°12′07″N 1°18′40″W | 1024455 | Church of St Mary More images |
| Gable End | Priors Marston, Stratford-on-Avon | Open Hall House | 14th century or early 15th century | 21 April 1986 | SP4889857496; 52°12′49″N 1°17′09″W | 1299516 | Gable End |
| Manor House | Upper Quinton, Quinton, Stratford-on-Avon | House | 17th-century addition | 6 February 1952 | SP1777946599; 52°07′03″N 1°44′30″W | 1382677 | Upload Photo |
| Radbrook Manor with attached Wall and Gates | Quinton, Stratford-on-Avon | Manor House | 16th-century origins | 1 July 1975 | SP1939848476; 52°08′03″N 1°43′05″W | 1382673 | Radbrook Manor with attached Wall and Gates More images |
| Egge Cottage | Edgehill, Radway, Stratford-on-Avon | House | 1744 | 8 April 1987 | SP3742447447; 52°07′27″N 1°27′17″W | 1355541 | Upload Photo |
| The Castle Inn | Radway, Stratford-on-Avon | Castle | c1746-47 | 7 January 1952 | SP3737047425; 52°07′26″N 1°27′20″W | 1024196 | Upload Photo |
| Gatehouse at the Castle Inn | Edgehill, Radway, Stratford-on-Avon | House | c1746-1747 | 7 January 1952 | SP3738247415; 52°07′26″N 1°27′19″W | 1355560 | Gatehouse at the Castle Inn More images |
| Radway Grange and attached Stable Block | Radway, Stratford-on-Avon | Country House | Late 16th century | 7 January 1952 | SP3698447992; 52°07′44″N 1°27′40″W | 1300035 | Upload Photo |
| Church of St Peter Ad Vincula | Ratley, Ratley and Upton, Stratford-on-Avon | Church | 12th century | 30 May 1967 | SP3834547334; 52°07′23″N 1°26′29″W | 1355550 | Church of St Peter Ad Vincula More images |
| Churchyard Cross Approximately 12 Metres North of Church of St Peter Ad Vincula | Ratley, Ratley and Upton, Stratford-on-Avon | Cross | 15th century | 8 April 1987 | SP3834747353; 52°07′23″N 1°26′29″W | 1024213 | Upload Photo |
| Upton House | Upton, Ratley and Upton, Stratford-on-Avon | Country House | c. 1710 | 7 January 1952 | SP3697045693; 52°06′30″N 1°27′42″W | 1024175 | Upton House More images |
| Wood Bevington Manor | Wood Bevington, Salford Priors, Stratford-on-Avon | Apartment | 1984 | 1 February 1967 | SP0531853950; 52°11′02″N 1°55′25″W | 1355368 | Wood Bevington Manor |
| Church of St Edmund | Shipston on Stour, Stratford-on-Avon | Church | 15th century | 13 October 1966 | SP2592740626; 52°03′48″N 1°37′24″W | 1024091 | Church of St Edmund More images |
| Church of St Lawrence | Shotteswell, Stratford-on-Avon | Church | 12th century | 30 May 1967 | SP4263845512; 52°06′23″N 1°22′44″W | 1024180 | Church of St Lawrence More images |
| Church of St Leonard | Spernall, Stratford-on-Avon | Workshop | 1985 | 1 February 1967 | SP0864062123; 52°15′26″N 1°52′29″W | 1024518 | Church of St Leonard More images |
| Church of St Michael | Stockton, Stratford-on-Avon | Church | 14th century | 30 May 1967 | SP4376663606; 52°16′08″N 1°21′36″W | 1035601 | Church of St Michael More images |
| Stourton Manor House and attached Barn | Stourton, Stratford-on-Avon | Farmhouse | Early 17th century | 13 October 1966 | SP2957436900; 52°01′47″N 1°34′13″W | 1024272 | Upload Photo |
| Former Parish Church of St James | Alveston, Stratford-upon-Avon | Parish Church | 12th century | 25 October 1951 | SP2307956696; 52°12′29″N 1°39′49″W | 1187755 | Former Parish Church of St James More images |
| Alveston House | Alveston, Stratford-upon-Avon | Country House | 1689 | 25 October 1951 | SP2328956853; 52°12′34″N 1°39′38″W | 1187754 | Upload Photo |
| American Fountain | Stratford-upon-Avon | Drinking Fountain | 1886-7 | 25 October 1951 | SP1993354999; 52°11′34″N 1°42′35″W | 1280258 | American Fountain More images |
| Clopton House and attached Former Stable Block, Walls and Gate Piers | Clopton, Stratford-upon-Avon | Apartment | 1994 | 25 October 1951 | SP2005256765; 52°12′31″N 1°42′29″W | 1281110 | Clopton House and attached Former Stable Block, Walls and Gate Piers More images |
| Dower House and Avon Croft and attached Garden Wall | Stratford-upon-Avon | House | 16th century | 25 October 1951 | SP2005754472; 52°11′17″N 1°42′29″W | 1206134 | Dower House and Avon Croft and attached Garden Wall More images |
| Garrick Inn | Stratford-upon-Avon | Inn | c. 1596 | 25 October 1951 | SP2010754876; 52°11′30″N 1°42′26″W | 1187814 | Garrick Inn More images |
| The Gower Monument | Stratford-upon-Avon | Commemorative Monument | 1876-88 | 25 October 1951 | SP2044254920; 52°11′32″N 1°42′09″W | 1204176 | The Gower Monument More images |
| Mason's Court | Stratford-upon-Avon | House | c. 1600 | 25 October 1951 | SP1984054844; 52°11′29″N 1°42′40″W | 1206233 | Mason's Court More images |
| Museum & Shakespeare Memorial Theatre & Swan Theatre | Stratford-upon-Avon | Rotunda | 1769 | 13 May 1971 | SP2033754730; 52°11′26″N 1°42′14″W | 1207396 | Museum & Shakespeare Memorial Theatre & Swan Theatre More images |
| Shakespeare Monument on East Side of the Great Garden of New Place | Stratford-upon-Avon | Commemorative Monument | 1789 | 9 February 1972 | SP2020554772; 52°11′27″N 1°42′21″W | 1298541 | Upload Photo |
| Stratford Upon Avon Grammar School for Girls | Shottery, Stratford-upon-Avon | Manor House | 15th century | 25 October 1951 | SP1891154663; 52°11′24″N 1°43′29″W | 1187858 | Stratford Upon Avon Grammar School for Girls More images |
| The Falcon Hotel | Stratford-upon-Avon | Jettied House | c. 1500 | 25 October 1951 | SP2005154761; 52°11′27″N 1°42′29″W | 1187771 | The Falcon Hotel More images |
| The Old Vicarage, King Edward VI Grammar School | Stratford-upon-Avon | Teachers House | 1994 | 25 October 1951 | SP2007754726; 52°11′25″N 1°42′28″W | 1204583 | Upload Photo |
| The Shakespeare Hotel | Stratford-upon-Avon | Hotel | 1951 | 25 October 1951 | SP2014954793; 52°11′28″N 1°42′24″W | 1204394 | The Shakespeare Hotel More images |
| The Shrieve's House | Stratford-upon-Avon | House | 1908 | 25 October 1951 | SP2023354876; 52°11′30″N 1°42′20″W | 1298586 | The Shrieve's House More images |
| Town Hall | Stratford-upon-Avon | Town Hall | 1769 | 25 October 1951 | SP2012754838; 52°11′29″N 1°42′25″W | 1298545 | Town Hall More images |
| Tudor House | Stratford-upon-Avon | Timber Framed House | 1595-6 | 25 October 1951 | SP2011354863; 52°11′30″N 1°42′26″W | 1298523 | Tudor House More images |
| Welcombe Hotel | Welcombe, Stratford-upon-Avon | Country House | c1866-1880 | 9 February 1972 | SP2086556756; 52°12′31″N 1°41′46″W | 1052288 | Welcombe Hotel More images |
| 19 and 20 High Street | Stratford-upon-Avon | Timber Framed House | c. 1610 | 9 February 1972 | SP2014654883; 52°11′31″N 1°42′24″W | 1187812 | 19 and 20 High Street |
| 30 High Street | Stratford-upon-Avon | Timber Framed House | c. 1600 | 25 October 1951 | SP2012054905; 52°11′31″N 1°42′26″W | 1187816 | Upload Photo |
| 1 High Street | Stratford-upon-Avon | Timber Framed House | c. 1600 | 25 October 1951 | SP2018154972; 52°11′33″N 1°42′22″W | 1187808 | Upload Photo |
| The Rectory | Stretton-on-Fosse, Stratford-on-Avon | House | Late 16th century | 13 October 1966 | SP2239138289; 52°02′33″N 1°40′30″W | 1355627 | Upload Photo |
| Church of St Mary | Studley, Stratford-on-Avon | Church | 12th century | 1 February 1967 | SP0813763758; 52°16′19″N 1°52′56″W | 1024491 | Church of St Mary More images |
| Claremont House | Studley, Stratford-on-Avon | House | Early C20 | 23 October 1985 | SP0733263784; 52°16′20″N 1°53′38″W | 1024493 | Claremont House |
| Mountbatten House and attached Garden Walls | Studley, Stratford-on-Avon | Manor House | Late 17th century | 1 February 1967 | SP0740863534; 52°16′12″N 1°53′34″W | 1355441 | Mountbatten House and attached Garden Walls More images |
| Priory Farmhouse | Priory Square, Studley, Stratford-on-Avon | Farmhouse | Early 14th century | 1 February 1967 | SP0730563994; 52°16′27″N 1°53′40″W | 1299578 | Priory Farmhouse |
| Studley Castle | Studley, Stratford-on-Avon | Country House | 1834 | 11 December 1969 | SP0881064074; 52°16′29″N 1°52′20″W | 1355446 | Studley Castle More images |
| The Old Castle | Studley, Stratford-on-Avon | Apartment | 1967 | 1 February 1967 | SP0813963842; 52°16′22″N 1°52′56″W | 1185815 | The Old Castle More images |
| Church of St Thomas Beckett | Sutton-under-Brailes, Stratford-on-Avon | Church | Late 12th century | 13 October 1966 | SP2988937414; 52°02′04″N 1°33′57″W | 1024275 | Church of St Thomas Beckett More images |
| Umberslade Hall | Umberslade Park, Tanworth-in-Arden, Stratford-on-Avon | Flats | c. 1990 | 6 February 1952 | SP1364571351; 52°20′24″N 1°48′04″W | 1382396 | Umberslade Hall More images |
| Hillborough Manor House | Temple Grafton, Stratford-on-Avon | Manor House | Early 16th-century work | 6 February 1952 | SP1261952078; 52°10′01″N 1°49′01″W | 1382782 | Upload Photo |
| Church of unknown dedication | Tidmington, Stratford-on-Avon | Church | c. 1200 | 13 October 1966 | SP2614738557; 52°02′41″N 1°37′13″W | 1024086 | Church of unknown dedication More images |
| Tidmington House | Tidmington, Stratford-on-Avon | Manor House | c. 1600 | 2 September 1952 | SP2616638588; 52°02′42″N 1°37′12″W | 1253800 | Tidmington House More images |
| Armscote House and attached Outbuilding | Armscote, Tredington, Stratford-on-Avon | House | Early 17th century | 13 October 1966 | SP2458844565; 52°05′56″N 1°38′33″W | 1024058 | Upload Photo |
| Camperdown Farmhouse | Darlingscott, Tredington, Stratford-on-Avon | Farmhouse | Mid 17th century | 13 October 1966 | SP2321442123; 52°04′37″N 1°39′46″W | 1024039 | Upload Photo |
| Darlingscott Farmhouse and attached Coach House and Outbuildings | Tredington, Stratford-on-Avon | Apartment | 1988 | 13 October 1966 | SP2326642150; 52°04′38″N 1°39′43″W | 1355646 | Upload Photo |
| Longdon Manorhouse | Tredington, Stratford-on-Avon | Manor House | Medieval | 16 May 1988 | SP2200941619; 52°04′21″N 1°40′49″W | 1024048 | Upload Photo |
| Manor Farmhouse | Darlingscott, Tredington, Stratford-on-Avon | Farmhouse | Mid to late 17th century | 13 October 1966 | SP2312342127; 52°04′37″N 1°39′50″W | 1355647 | Upload Photo |
| Preaching Cross approx. 10 Metres South of Nave of Church of the Assumption of the Blessed Virgin Mary | Middle Tysoe, Tysoe, Stratford-on-Avon | Preaching Cross | 15th century | 23 February 1988 | SP3410744349; 52°05′47″N 1°30′13″W | 1035537 | Upload Photo |
| Tysoe Manor and attached Wall | Upper Tysoe, Tysoe, Stratford-on-Avon | House | 17th century | 2 September 1952 | SP3341143762; 52°05′28″N 1°30′50″W | 1186224 | Tysoe Manor and attached Wall More images |
| Church of St Michael | Ufton, Stratford-on-Avon | Church | Early 13th century | 30 May 1967 | SP3786262173; 52°15′23″N 1°26′48″W | 1186020 | Church of St Michael More images |
| Old Church of St Mary | Ullenhall, Stratford-on-Avon | Church | 13th century | 5 April 1967 | SP1306867585; 52°18′22″N 1°48′35″W | 1382493 | Old Church of St Mary More images |
| Church of St John the Baptist in the Wilderness | Upper and Lower Shuckburgh, Stratford-on-Avon | Church | 13th century or earlier | 30 May 1967 | SP4970961761; 52°15′06″N 1°16′24″W | 1024436 | Church of St John the Baptist in the Wilderness More images |
| Shuckburgh Hall | Upper and Lower Shuckburgh, Stratford-on-Avon | Country House | C14/C15 | 7 January 1952 | SP4971261860; 52°15′10″N 1°16′24″W | 1024393 | Shuckburgh Hall More images |
| Arlescote House | Arlescote, Warmington, Stratford-on-Avon | House | Late 17th century | 7 January 1952 | SP3896848679; 52°08′06″N 1°25′56″W | 1299889 | Arlescote House More images |
| The Manor House | Warmington, Stratford-on-Avon | Manor House | c. 1603 | 7 January 1952 | SP4124347673; 52°07′33″N 1°23′56″W | 1024139 | The Manor House More images |
| Cleavers | Welford-on-Avon, Stratford-on-Avon | House | c. 1740 | 6 February 1952 | SP1457152276; 52°10′07″N 1°47′18″W | 1382817 | Upload Photo |
| Walton Hall including Game Larder | Walton, Wellesbourne, Stratford-on-Avon | Country House | 1858-62 | 2 August 1972 | SP2848952358; 52°10′08″N 1°35′06″W | 1381986 | Walton Hall including Game Larder More images |
| The Bath House approx. 60 Metres North East of Walton Hall | Walton, Wellesbourne, Stratford-on-Avon | Bath House | c. 1750 | 5 April 1967 | SP2900952746; 52°10′20″N 1°34′38″W | 1381987 | The Bath House approx. 60 Metres North East of Walton Hall More images |
| Bridge over Lake and attached Railings approx. 250 Metres North of Walton Hall | Walton, Wellesbourne, Stratford-on-Avon | Bridge | c. 1860 | 19 August 1999 | SP2843852580; 52°10′15″N 1°35′08″W | 1381991 | Bridge over Lake and attached Railings approx. 250 Metres North of Walton Hall More images |
| Church of St Peter | Wellesbourne Hastings, Wellesbourne, Stratford-on-Avon | Church | Late 13th century | 5 April 1967 | SP2772455596; 52°11′52″N 1°35′45″W | 1382017 | Church of St Peter More images |
| The Little House | Wellesbourne Mountford, Wellesbourne, Stratford-on-Avon | House | 1699 | 2 August 1972 | SP2769755165; 52°11′39″N 1°35′46″W | 1382012 | The Little House |
| Wellesbourne Hall | Wellesbourne Mountford, Wellesbourne, Stratford-on-Avon | Country House | c. 1700 | 6 February 1952 | SP2758755219; 52°11′40″N 1°35′52″W | 1382037 | Upload Photo |
| Church of St Peter | Whatcote, Stratford-on-Avon | Church | C12-C14 | 13 October 1966 | SP2987044534; 52°05′54″N 1°33′55″W | 1024347 | Church of St Peter More images |
| Whichford House and attached Balustrades | Whichford, Stratford-on-Avon | House | 1988 | 2 September 1952 | SP3125234649; 52°00′34″N 1°32′46″W | 1116069 | Whichford House and attached Balustrades More images |
| Church of St Mary | Whitchurch, Stratford-on-Avon | Church | Late 11th century | 2 August 1972 | SP2265448622; 52°08′08″N 1°40′14″W | 1382684 | Church of St Mary More images |
| Church of St Milburga | Wixford, Stratford-on-Avon | Church | 12th century and 13th century | 1 February 1967 | SP0900054940; 52°11′33″N 1°52′11″W | 1355369 | Church of St Milburga More images |
| Moor Hall | Wixford, Stratford-on-Avon | House | 17th century | 1 February 1967 | SP0878753763; 52°10′55″N 1°52′22″W | 1024655 | Upload Photo |
| Church of St Mary the Virgin | Wolverton, Stratford-on-Avon | Church | 1208 | 5 April 1967 | SP2062162333; 52°15′32″N 1°41′58″W | 1382195 | Church of St Mary the Virgin More images |
| Aqueduct and attached Railings (that part in Wootton Wawen CP) | Wootton Wawen, Stratford-on-Avon | Aqueduct | c1812-1816 | 4 January 1990 | SP1620260919; 52°14′46″N 1°45′51″W | 1382215 | Aqueduct and attached Railings (that part in Wootton Wawen CP) More images |
| Manor Farmhouse | Wootton Wawen, Stratford-on-Avon | Flats | 1980s alterations | 6 February 1952 | SP1521063601; 52°16′13″N 1°46′43″W | 1382243 | Manor Farmhouse More images |
| Wootton Hall | Wootton Wawen, Stratford-on-Avon | Flats | Late C20 additions | 6 February 1952 | SP1549663359; 52°16′05″N 1°46′28″W | 1382249 | Wootton Hall More images |
| Former Chapel at Wootton Hall | Wootton Wawen, Stratford-on-Avon | Roman Catholic Chapel | 1813 | 5 April 1967 | SP1551963378; 52°16′06″N 1°46′26″W | 1382250 | Former Chapel at Wootton Hall |
| Wootton Wawen Aqueduct | Wootton Wawen, Stratford-on-Avon | Aqueduct | 1813 | 4 January 1990 | SP1585462976; 52°15′53″N 1°46′09″W | 1382221 | Wootton Wawen Aqueduct More images |
| Tower Cottage & Wormleighton Manor Gatehouse | Wormleighton, Stratford-on-Avon | Gate | 1613 | 7 January 1952 | SP4481853740; 52°10′48″N 1°20′45″W | 1186246 | Tower Cottage & Wormleighton Manor Gatehouse More images |
| Wormleighton Manor House | Wormleighton, Stratford-on-Avon | Farmhouse | 1986 | 7 January 1952 | SP4483653791; 52°10′50″N 1°20′44″W | 1024403 | Wormleighton Manor House More images |
