= Stratford's Historic Spine =

Route in Stratford-upon-Avon, England

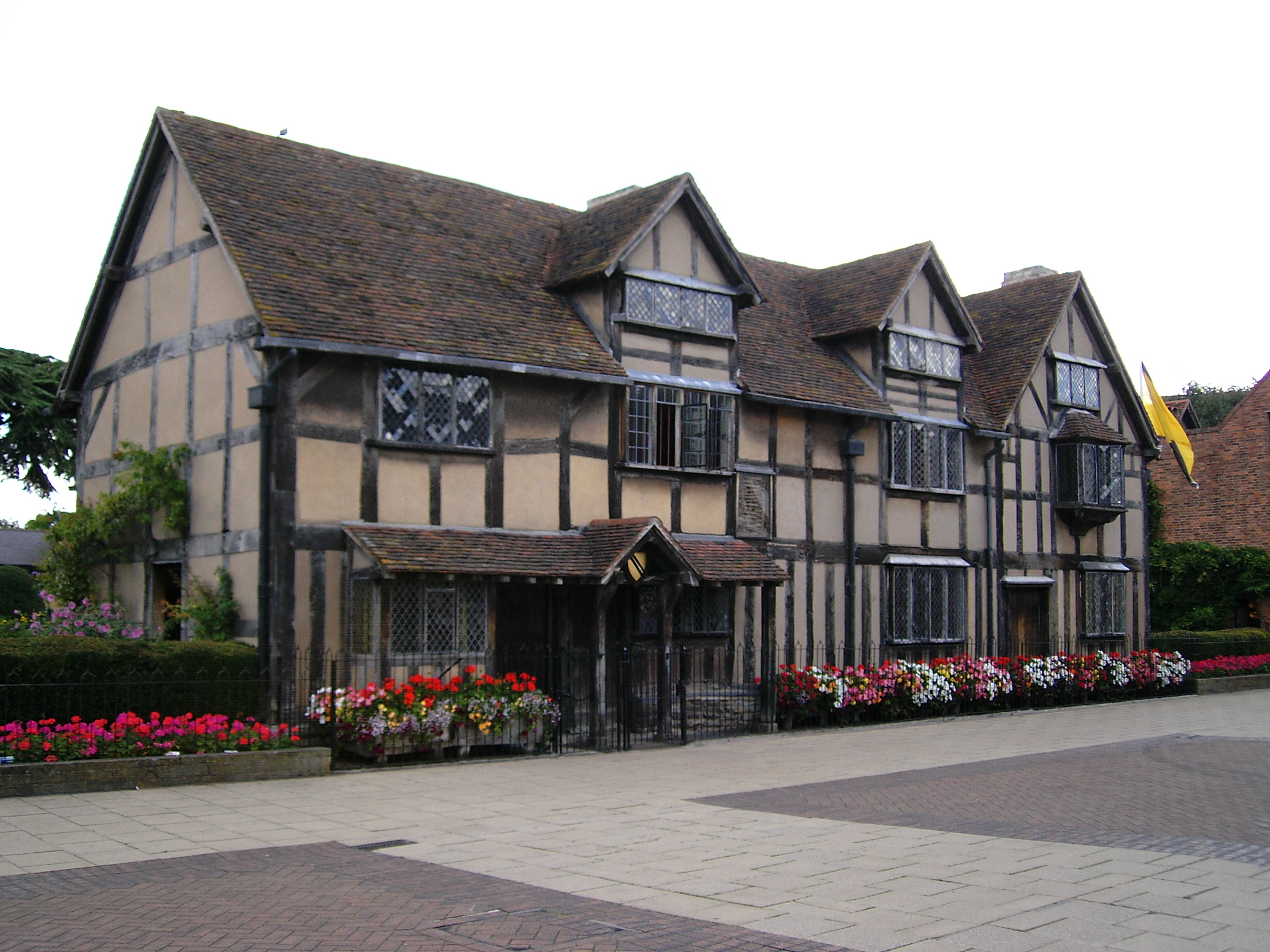
Shakespeare's Birthplace, along the route of the Historic Spine

Stratford's Historic Spine is the name given to a route in Stratford-upon-Avon along which many of the town's most important and historic buildings are sited, with many of the buildings connected to William Shakespeare. The Historic Spine was once the main route from the town centre to the parish church. It begins in Henley Street at Shakespeare's Birthplace and finishes in Old Town at The Holy Trinity Church and has buildings from the 14th up to the 20th centuries.

== History ==
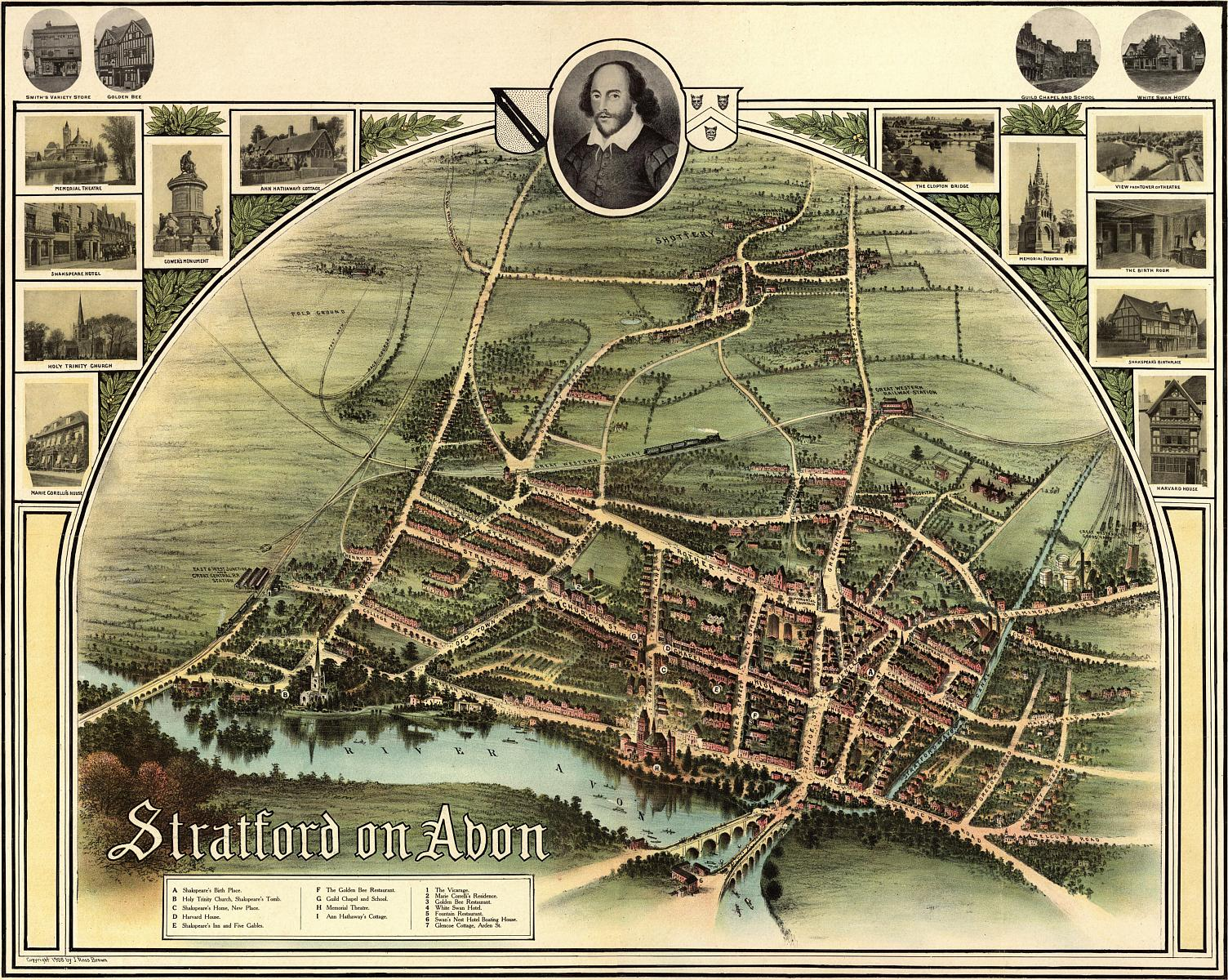
Historic map from 1902. The route of the Historic Spine can be seen from Shakespeare's Birthplace (A) to The Holy Trinity Church (B)

Following Stratford's expansion from a village into a town in the early 12th century, the route linking the new town to the Holy Trinity Church in Old Town became the location for many of the towns earliest and most important buildings.

The route of the Historic Spine has become one of Stratford's tourist attractions. In December 2015, The Royal Shakespeare Company (RSC) announced it had commissioned a self-guided tour of the Historic Spine to mark the 400th anniversary of the death of Shakespeare. The tour allowed people to follow painted footsteps on the ground and read speech bubbles, also painted on the ground, to act out mini dramas from Shakespeare's plays.

== Streets and notable buildings ==
Stratford-upon-Avon Town Hall

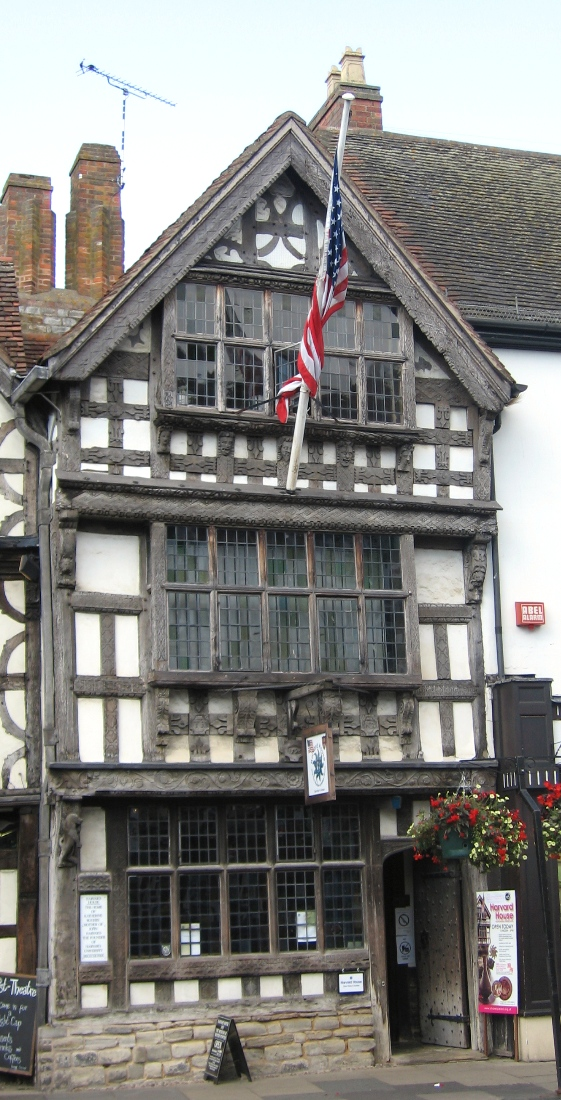
26 High Street, Harvard House

The Historic Spine runs for approximately 0.6 miles (0.9 km) and begins in Henley Street at the birthplace of Shakespeare. Also along Henley Street lies the medieval public library.

It then meets Bridge Street where Market Hall is located, built in 1821. Also located along Bridge Street is the former location of the National Provincial Bank, a mock tudor building constructed in 1924.

The route then goes into High Street. No.1 High Street is the former home of Shakespeare's daughter Judith and her husband, Thomas Quiney, from 1616 to 1637. Many of the buildings in High Street are Elizabethan characterized by their black and white facades, including the Grade II* listed Garrick Inn – reputedly the oldest pub in the town, and Harvard House which was built in 1596.

Next along the route is The Corn Market, where four streets converge. Located on the corner of Chapel Street and Sheep Street is the stone built Town Hall, another Grade II* listed building and constructed in 1767. On the front of the building there is a statue of Shakespeare which was given by the Shakespearean actor David Garrick. Opposite the Town Hall is a High Victorian property built in 1883 for the Birmingham Banking Company.

Along Chapel Street and next door to the Town Hall is the Shakespeare Hotel, a 16th-century building with a mock-tudor front added in 1920 and a mid-16th-century, five-gabled property next door which has been incorporated into the hotel. Opposite, there is a collection of 18th-century properties, with Nos 7 and 11 being timber-framed with 18th-century fronts. The Falcon Hotel, originally used as an inn, lies further along Chapel Street. It was built in around 1500 with a third floor added in the 17th century. Stratford's first bank was located at No. 21 Chapel Street, a timber-framed building which stands next door to another timber-framed property along the historic route. Next door to No. 21 Chapel Street is Nash's House at No. 22, another timber-framed building. It was owned by Thomas Nash who was the first husband of Elizabeth Hall, Shakespeare's granddaughter. Although dating back to Shakespeare's time, the facade of Nash's House was rebuilt in 1912. On the corner of Chapel Street and Chapel Lane is the site of New Place, built in the 1490s by Hugh Clopton and was the home of Shakespeare from 1597 until his death in 1616. The house was knocked down in 1759 and the site remains empty to this day.

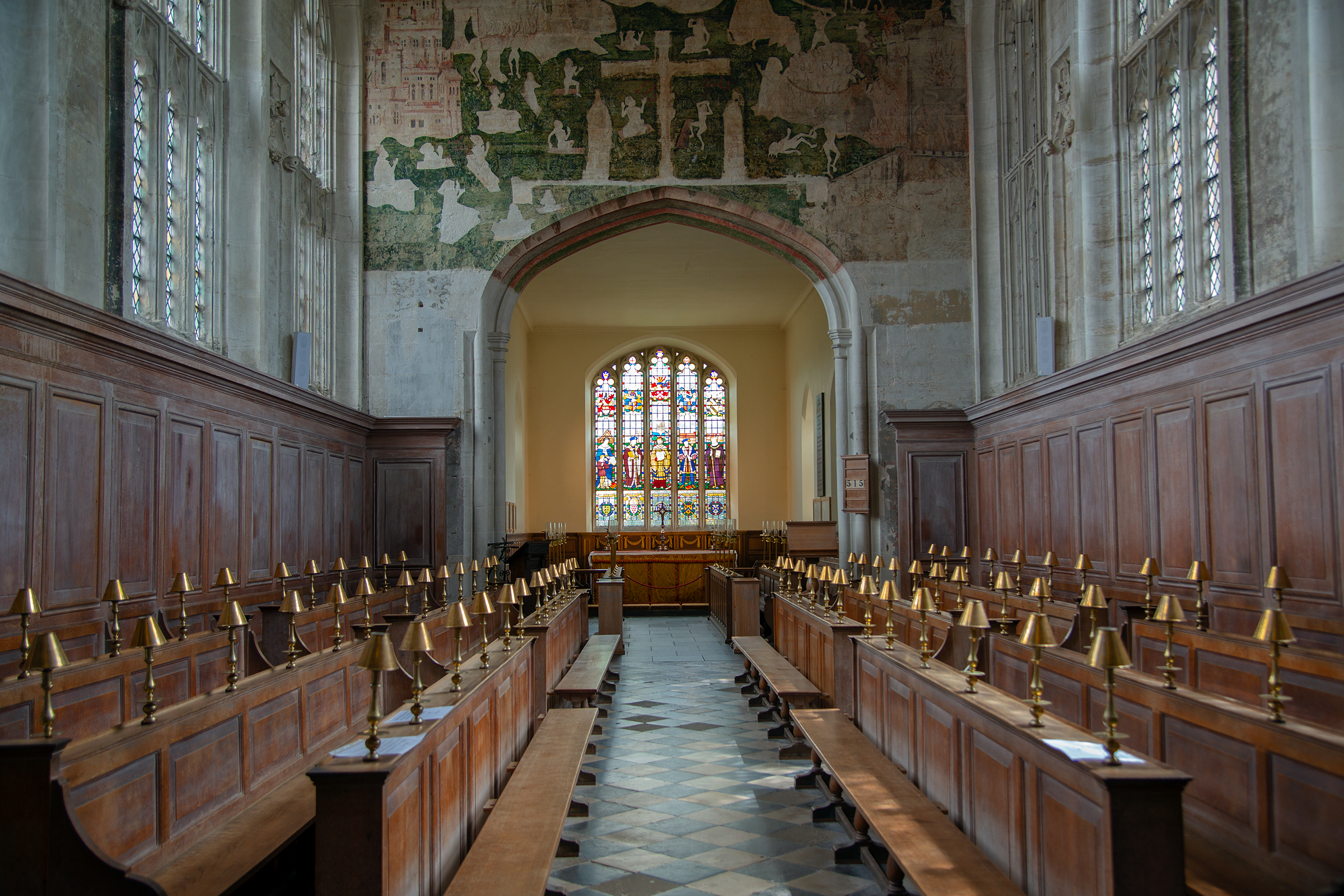
Interior of the Guild Chapel

On the other side of Chapel Lane lies the Guild Chapel. It was originally used as a hospital in 1269 by the Guild of the Holy Cross. It was later used as a chapel and rebuilt in the early 15th century with parts of the building possibly dating back to 1269. The Guild buildings continue along Church Street with the former Guildhall, now a grammar school and the school Shakespeare is believed to have attended. Built in the 1420s, it was originally used as the Guild's business headquarters. Next door are the Almshouses which are also thought to have been built in the 1420s. Sited on the corner of Church Street and Scholars Lane is Sadlers House, built in about 1600. Due to two renovations in 1768 and 1840, the property is a mixture of timber-framing, Gothic windows and parapet. In 1856, Nos 18 and 19 Church Street were built, which followed the construction of Nos 20 and 21 in 1831. On the other side of the road is Masons Croft, which was the former home of Marie Corelli and built in the 1720s. No 2 Church Street is a building a few years older and is the former home of lawyer Thomas Rawlins. A third floor was added to the property in 1870 when the building was used as a school. No. 1 Church Street is a former house built in around 1690 and was the home of tobacconist William Warry.

The final location of the route is Old Town. The first properties in Old Town are a row of Georgian houses, including No. 5 Old Town, Old Town Place, built in 1760. Constructed some time in the 1850s, Old Town Cottage lies next door, while opposite the early 17th century and later extended Hall's Croft is located – the former home of Shakespeare's daughter Susanna and her husband John Hall. Further along lie a row of buildings built in the 16th century which were originally timber-framed now replaced by stucco and roughcast facades.

The final building along the route of the Historic Spine is the Holy Trinity Church, the location of Shakespeare's baptism and burial. It was originally built in the 13th century, with some parts rebuilt in the 14th and 15th centuries.
