= Garrick Inn =

Pub in Stratford-Upon-Avon, England

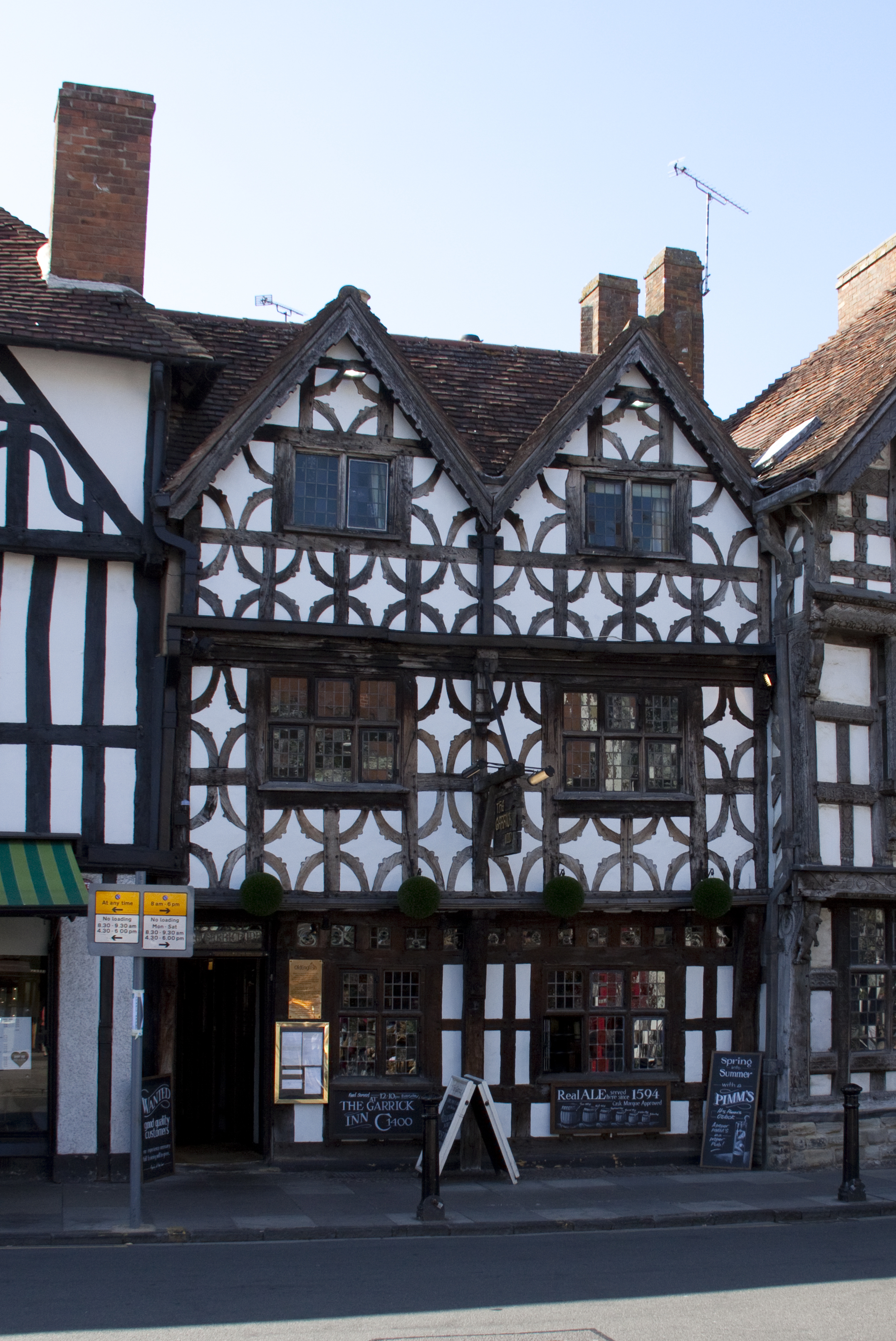
- The Garrick Inn, reputedly the oldest pub in Stratford-upon-Avon
- Interactive map of Garrick Inn
- Type: Pub / Inn
- Location: 25 High Street, Stratford-upon-Avon, Warwickshire, England
- Coordinates: 52.191823°N 1.70686°W
- OS grid reference: SP 20107 54876
- Built: 15th century (site); 1596 (current building)
- Restored: c 1912 and 2025
- Architectural styles: Elizabethan; Half-timbered

Listed Building – Grade II*
- Official name: Garrick Inn
- Designated: 25 October 1951
- Reference no.: 1187814

The Garrick Inn is a pub in Stratford-upon-Avon, in Warwickshire, England, located at 25 High Street, next door to Harvard House. It is reputedly the oldest pub in the town. (Note: Other pubs in Stratford-upon-Avon also make the claim of being the oldest in the town. However, given that the original building on this site dates back to the 14th century and there was an inn before the current building was constructed, it is possibly true that the Garrick is the oldest. It is also possible that other pubs were officially licensed before the Garrick.) The Garrick is located along Stratford's Historic Spine.

== History ==
It has been an inn within the current Elizabethan, half-timbered building since 1718. An earlier medieval building on the same site was also used as an inn.

The precise date of the construction of the current building is not known. However, it is considered to be 1596, with parts dating back to the 14th century, making it one of the oldest buildings in Stratford-upon-Avon. It is listed at Grade II*, a heritage designation for properties which are "particularly important buildings of more than special interest". Restoration of the property took place in around 1912, when a brick front added in about 1800 was replaced. Restoration also took place in 2005.

It was previously called the Greyhound, as well as the Reindeer, (Note: Sources show that it was called the Greyhound and the Reindeer. However, it is unclear when each name was used.) before its name was changed to the Garrick Inn after the actor David Garrick in 1795.

It is thought that a bout of plague may have started within the original inn in 1564 after a weaver's apprentice, Oliver Gunn, died of the disease there. The phrase "hic incepit pestis", which translates as 'here begins the plague', was written in Gunn's burial entry. However, it is unclear whether these words were added to the burial register in order to indicate the local plague outbreak starting at this location.

It is also claimed that the pub is haunted.

== See also ==
- Grade II* listed buildings in Stratford-on-Avon (district)
- List of pubs in the United Kingdom
- Harvard House, 26 High Street, Stratford-upon-Avon
