= Ilmington Downs =

Open space in Warwickshire, England

Coordinates: 52.0812°N 1.7113°W

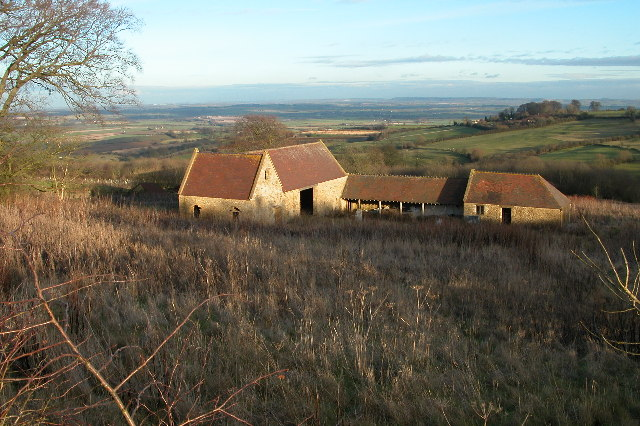
Stoke Hill Barn on the Ilmington Downs

The Ilmington Downs are a large open area situated in Warwickshire, just above the small village of Ilmington. It is the highest point in Warwickshire at 858 feet with good views of that part of the Cotswolds.
