= St Mary's Church, Halford =

Church of St Mary, Halford
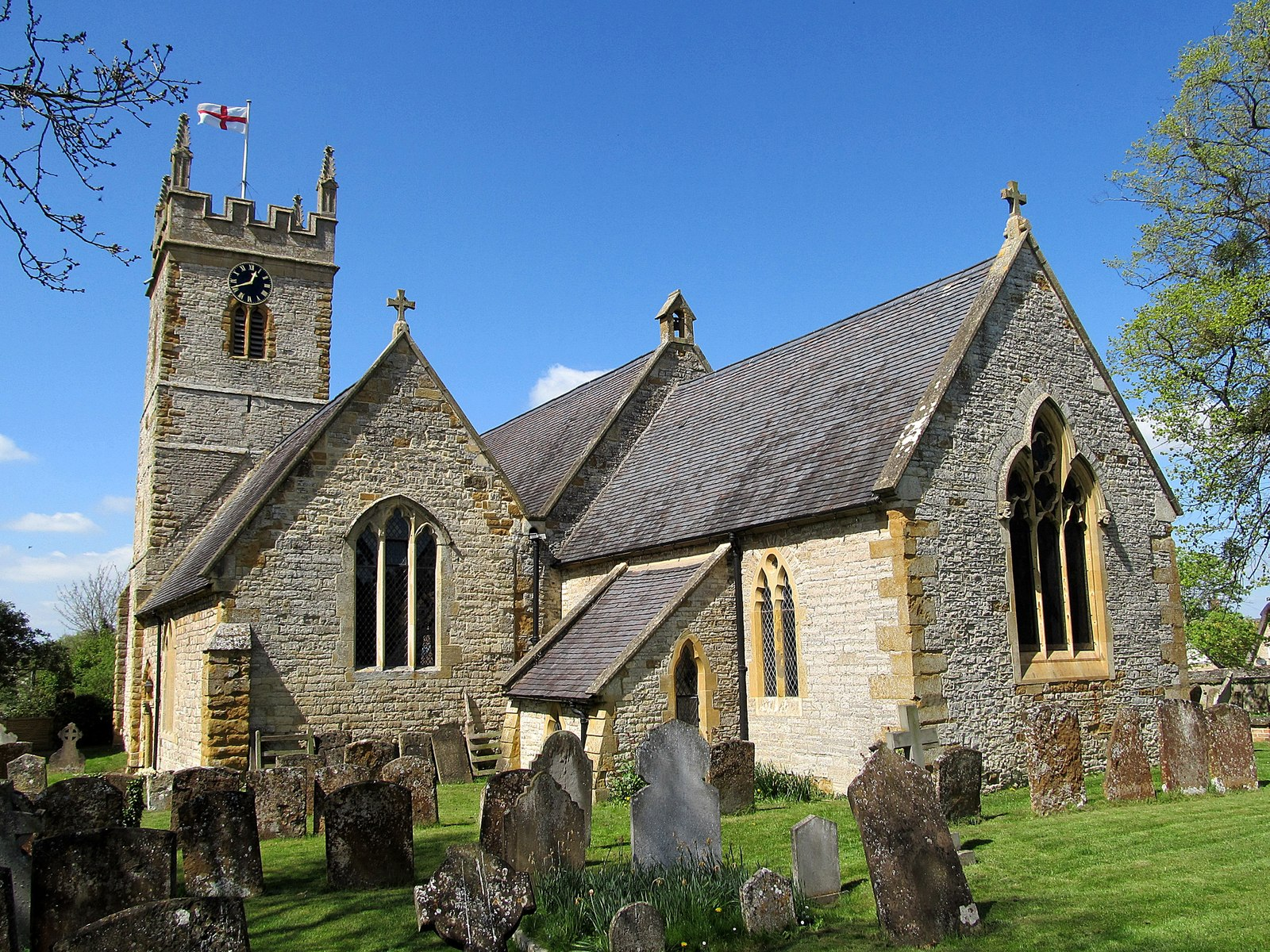
- Church of St Mary, Halford
- 52°06′29.88″N 1°37′24.67″W
- OS grid reference: SP 25881 45615
- Location: Halford, Warwickshire
- Country: England
- Denomination: Church of England

Architecture
- Heritage designation: Grade II*
- Designated: 13 October 1966

Administration
- Diocese: Diocese of Coventry

Listed Building – Grade II*
- Official name: Church of St Mary
- Designated: 13 October 1966
- Reference no.: 1185710

The Church of St Mary is an Anglican church in the village of Halford, in Warwickshire, England, and in the Diocese of Coventry. The building dates from the 12th and 13th centuries, and was much restored in the 19th century. It is Grade II* listed.

== History and description ==
There is a nave and chancel, and a south aisle, west of which is the tower. There was much restoration in 1862 and 1883, but notable features remain from the 12th and 13th centuries.

The semi-circular chancel arch, and a niche adjacent to it to the south, and parts of the north wall of the nave, date from the 12th century. There is a small north window, a later replacement of probably a 12th-century window.

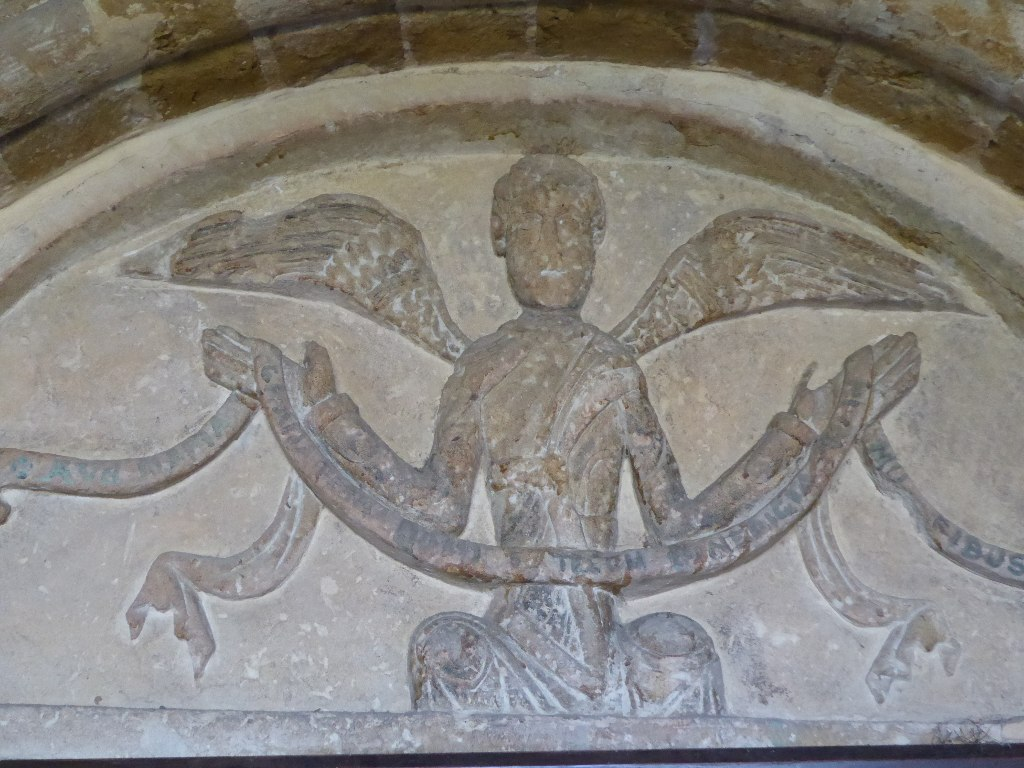
The tympanum above the north door

The north doorway, dating from the mid-12th century, has a semi-circular arch and a tympanum which the listing text remarks "shows one of the earliest known examples of a half-length figure"; it has outspread wings and arms and holds a scroll or ribbon. The gabled porch to the north doorway is thought to be from the 17th or 18th century.

The south doorway, also of the 12th century, has a badly weathered arch and an undecorated tympanum.

The nave was lengthened in the 13th century, and the chancel is thought to date from this period. The south aisle, with a three-bay arcade (rebuilt in more recent years), and the tower are also of the 13th century.

There is an octagonal stone font dating from the 14th century. Its carved oak cover, of the 16th century, has a pyramid shape with crocketed ribs at the angles, and five mitred heads as the finial.

=== Bells ===
There are six bells; the treble bell, by John Taylor & Co, was added to the previous ring of five in 2000, with the help of a Millennium grant. The fourth bell is of unknown date, thought to be 14th-century. There are two bells dating from the late 16th century, one of 1639, and a bell by John Taylor dated 1883, which is a recast of a 15th-century bell.

=== Churchyard ===
A chest tomb of 1799, about 12 metres north east of the chancel, and a headstone of 1682, about 1 metre from the south-east corner of the south aisle, are listed Grade II.

== See also ==
- Grade II* listed buildings in Stratford-on-Avon (district)
