= Charlecote Mill =

- Viewed from the south
- Interactive map of Charlecote Mill
- 52.21257°N 1.62228°W
- Type: Watermill
- Location: Charlecote/Hampton Lucy, Warwickshire, England
- OS grid reference: SP 25902 57215

Site notes
- Website: www.charlecotemill.co.uk

Listed Building – Grade II*
- Official name: Charlecote Mill and wall to south
- Designated: 28 October 1999
- Reference no.: 1382109

Listed Building – Grade II
- Official name: Charlecote Mill House
- Designated: 2 August 1972
- Reference no.: 1381814

Listed Building – Grade II
- Official name: Outbuilding immediately north east of Charlecote Mill House
- Designated: 18 March 1997
- Reference no.: 1381815

Charlecote Mill is a watermill in Hampton Lucy, Warwickshire, England, near to Charlecote Park and about 4 miles (6 km) east of Stratford-upon-Avon. It is a Grade II* listed building. Since the 1980s there has been a full-time business producing flour, and there are occasional open days.

== History ==
The mill in Hampton recorded in the Domesday Book of 1086, valued at 6s 8d, is thought to be a mill on this site. The present building was constructed, with Charlecote Mill House ( a Grade II listed building) to which it is attached, by the Lucy estate.

The earliest reference to a mill on this site is in 1728; it had been in used some time, as significant repairs were made in 1731. It is shown on a map of the Lucy estate in 1736, with the watercourses in the same layout as at present, with two waterwheels. The watercourses were repaired in 1753. A millstone in the present building is inscribed "This bed stone was put in 1806". There were further modifications during the 19th century.

=== From the twentieth century ===
By the 1930s the waterwheels, in a poor state of repair, were not in use for milling; animal feed was produced, milled using modern machinery, by a tractor and later by electricity. Waterpower from the west wheel operated the sack hoist. Milling ceased in 1960. In 1978 the west waterwheel was made to turn for the filming of the BBC's adaptation of The Mill on the Floss.

The owner, Sir Edmund Fairfax-Lucy, sought to rent out the mill: the new miller undertook repairs, including renewing the paddles of the waterwheels and the sluice gates, and in 1981 the building was brought back into use, milling flour, without the machinery of the early 20th century. From 1983 milling has been a full-time business.

The mill is occasionally open to the public, and private tours can be arranged.

== Description ==
The building has a T-plan, the main elevation being to the south. The water passes on both sides of the building, with an undershot waterwheel at either end; the wheels and associated machinery flank the central working area. Each wheel drives two pairs of stones on the milling floor.

== See also ==
- De Lucy
- Cameron-Ramsay-Fairfax-Lucy baronets
