= Harvard House =

Grade I listed building in Stratford-upon-Avon, United Kingdom

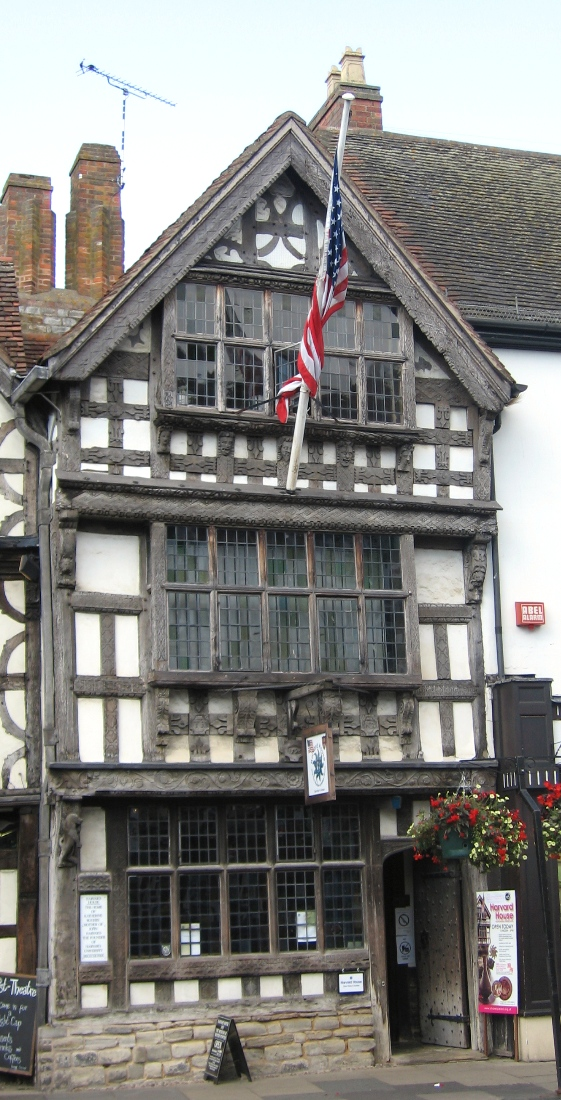
- Harvard House in 2006
- Interactive map of Harvard House
- Type: Historic townhouse
- Location: 26 High Street, Stratford-upon-Avon, Warwickshire, England
- Coordinates: 52.1908°N 1.7079°W
- OS grid reference: SP 20113 54880
- Built: 1596
- Architectural style: Half-timbered
- Governing body: Shakespeare Birthplace Trust (since 1990)
- Owner: Harvard University

Listed Building – Grade I
- Official name: Harvard House
- Designated: 25 October 1951
- Reference no.: 1298524

Harvard House stands at what is now 26 High Street, Stratford-upon-Avon, in Warwickshire, England. Once known as the Ancient House, It was built in 1596, by Thomas Rogers, grandfather of the benefactor of Harvard University, John Harvard, following the disastrous fires in 1594 and 1595 which destroyed much of the town centre. The House has been cared for by the Shakespeare Birthplace Trust, on behalf of Harvard University, since 1990. It has been listed as a grade I listed building since October 1951.

== History ==
Thomas Rogers' initials and those of his second wife, Alice, are carved on the front of the house, together with the date 1596. These indicate it was a separate house, although Rogers also owned the adjoining property at what is now 27 and 28 High Street.

About 60 years old when the house was built, Rogers was a successful butcher and also a corn and cattle merchant. He served as Alderman for the Stratford Corporation alongside John Shakespeare, William's father.

When Thomas died in 1611 he left the house to his eldest surviving son from his second marriage, also named Thomas. This Thomas was a maltster; a person who produced malt, which was used in brewing beer. He died in 1639 and the property passed to his son, Edward Rogers, a bookbinder.

In the middle of the 1600s, Edward Rogers sold the house to John Capp, a blacksmith, whose family continued to run the business until about 1725. It was then let to a series of tenants; booksellers in the early 1730s and 1760s, a plumber during the years 1734–1747, and a succession of ironmongers from 1782 until 1801. Tailors Thomas and Harvey Williams were in occupation until 1871, when the premises became an estate agent's office.

In 1909, at the suggestion and enthusiastic support of the English novelist and Stratford-upon-Avon resident Marie Corelli, the house was purchased by the American millionaire Edward Morris of Chicago. After extensive restoration, it was given to Harvard University and became known as Harvard House.

== See also ==
- Garrick Inn, 25 High Street, Stratford-upon-Avon
