= Halford, Warwickshire =

Village in Warwickshire, England

Coordinates: 52.10819°N 1.61988°W

Halford
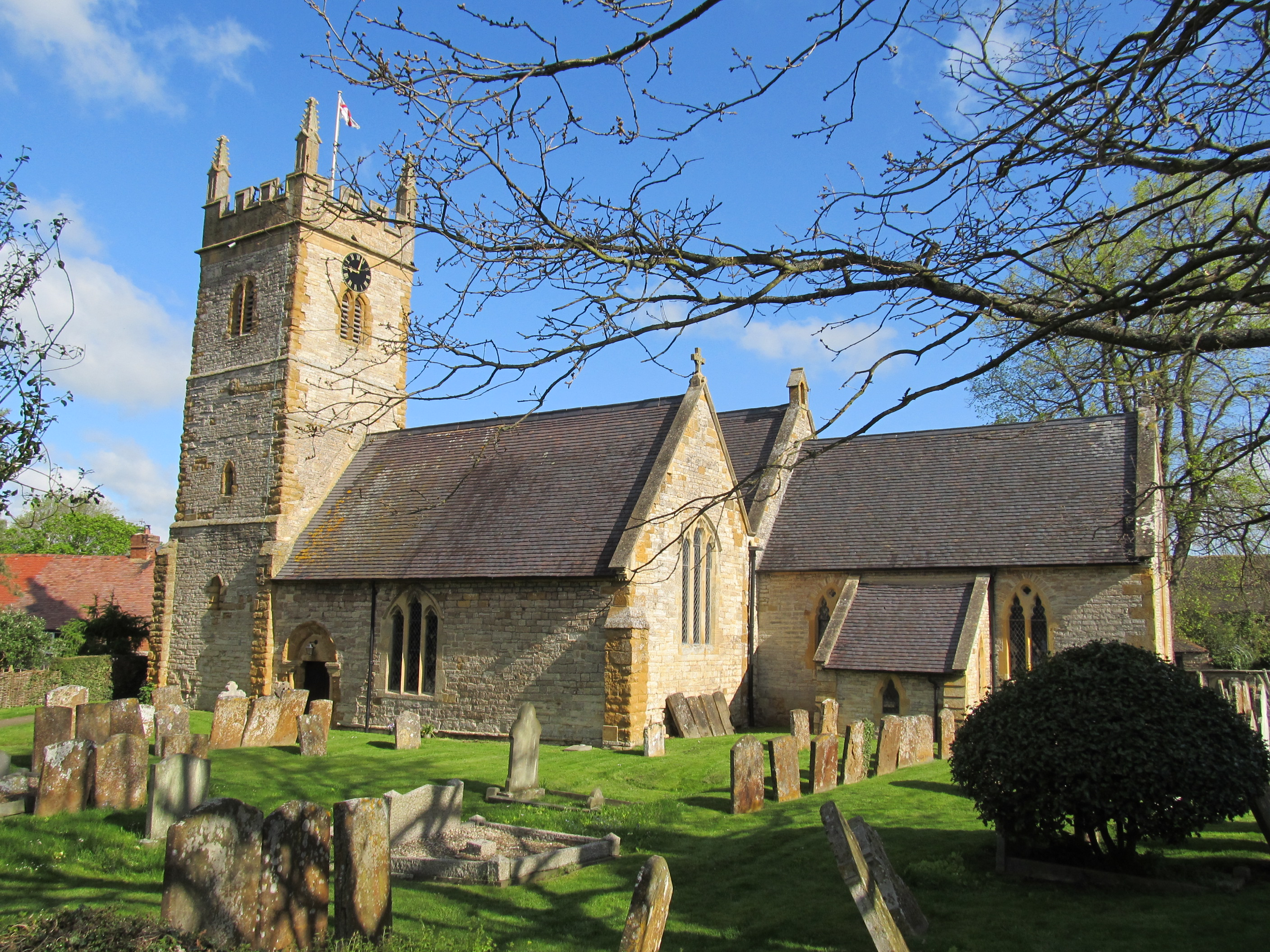
- Parish church of St Mary

- Location within Warwickshire
- Population: 341 (2011 Census)
- OS grid reference: SP2545
- District: Stratford-on-Avon
- Shire county: Warwickshire
- Region: West Midlands
- Country: England
- Sovereign state: United Kingdom
- Post town: Stratford-on-Avon
- Postcode district: CV36
- Dialling code: 01789
- Police: Warwickshire
- Fire: Warwickshire
- Ambulance: West Midlands
- UK Parliament: Stratford-on-Avon
- Website: Halford Parish Council

Halford is a village and civil parish about 3 miles (5 km) north of Shipston-on-Stour in Warwickshire, England. The village is where the Fosse Way Roman road (now the A429 road) crosses the River Stour. The 2011 Census recorded the parish's population as 341. By the river are the earthworks and buried remains of Halford Castle, a motte castle believed to be the predecessor of the present manor house. The parish church of St Mary has a Norman doorway with carved tympanum and a Norman chancel arch.

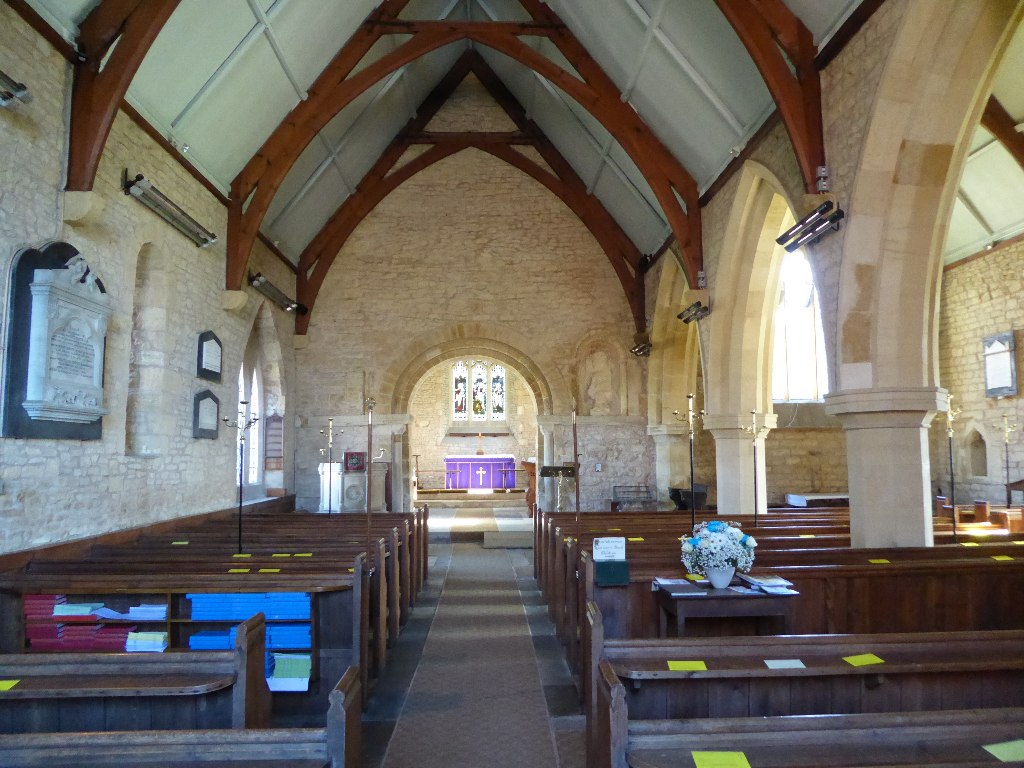
Inside St Mary's Church
