= The Gower Monument =

Memorial to William Shakespeare in Stratford-upon-Avon

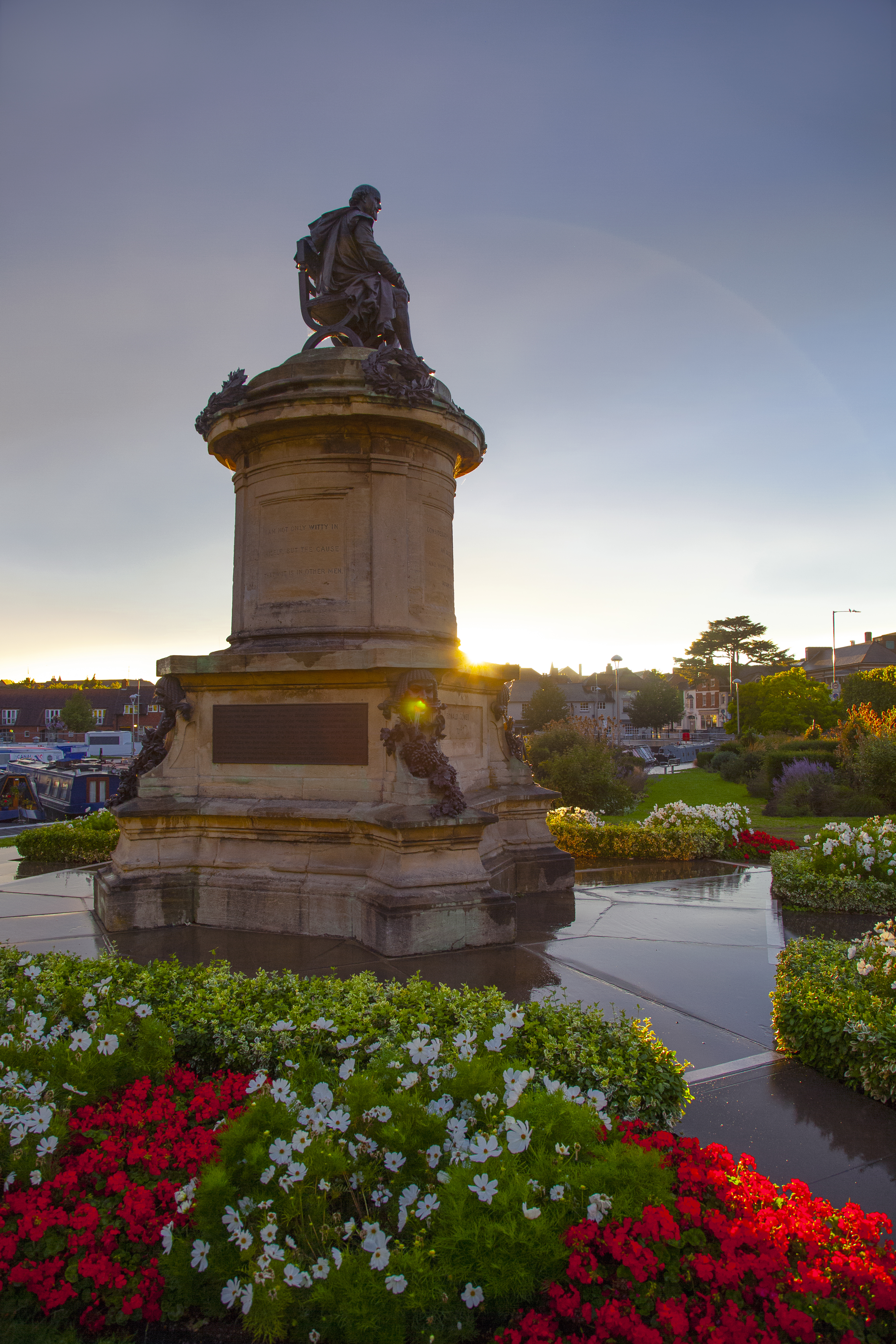
- The Gower Monument, Bancroft Gardens, Stratford-Upon-Avon
- Interactive map of The Gower Monument
- Location: Stratford-Upon-Avon, Warwickshire
- Coordinates: 52°11′32″N 1°42′09″W
- Designer: Lord Ronald Gower
- Type: Sculptural monument
- Material: Yorkstone, Bath stone, and Bronze
- Beginning date: 1876
- Completion date: 1888
- Dedicated to: William Shakespeare

The Gower Monument is a grade II* listed monument in Stratford-upon-Avon, Warwickshire. Erected in 1888, the monument's centrepiece is a seated bronze sculpture of the playwright and poet William Shakespeare. The monument is flanked by four detached bronze statues on plinths representing popular characters from Shakespeare's plays; Prince Hal, Lady Macbeth, Hamlet, and Falstaff.

== Design ==
The monument was designed and constructed in Paris over a 12-year period between 1876 and 1888 by Lord Ronald Gower, Luca Madrassi, Raux & Marley, and the House of De Cauville & Perzinku. Its estimated price per year of construction was £500. The stone portions of the structure comprise a mixture of Yorkstone and Bath stone. The sculptures and fittings on the monument are made of bronze.

The monument features a central stone plinth adorned with a bronze seated sculpture of William Shakespeare, holding both pen and parchement. Each side of this central plinth features an inscription from four of Shakespeare's plays; Henry V, Henry IV, Part 2, Macbeth, and Hamlet. Attached to each of the four corners of the central plinth is a bronze Greek mask.

Detached from the main plinth are four bronze statues on separate pedestals representing popular characters from Shakespeare's plays. These characters were intended to be emblematic of Shakespeare's creative versatility. The statue of Prince Hal represents history, Hamlet is to represent philosophy, Lady Macbeth symbolises tragedy, whilst finally Falstaff signifies comedy.

== History ==
Following its completion in 1888, the monument was originally erected in the gardens behind what was then the Shakespeare Memorial Theatre (now the Swan Theatre).

The monument was unveiled in Stratford-Upon-Avon accompanied by a speech from Sir Francis Philip Cunliffe-Owen, director of the South Kensington Museum (now the V&A Museum), and Oscar Wilde reading a poem dedicated to the monument written by Mrs. R. S. de Courcey Laffan, wife of the headmaster of the local grammar school.

The unveiling of the memorial did receive some criticism. The satirical magazine Punch mocked both the cost allegedly incurred by Lord Gower to construct the monument and the 'originality' of its design in an article titled "Immortality Indeed!". The anonymous author of the article remarked "Now who but a born genius would ever dreamt of representing Shakespeare in such an attitude, and with all these properties,"a pen in his right hand," and a "roll of manuscript in his left." What perfect symbolism!"

The monument, along with the four detached bronze statues was moved to its current position in Bancroft gardens in 1933 following the 1926 fire in the Shakespeare Memorial Theatre and subsequent redevelopment of the area.

The Gower Monument became a listed monument on 25 October 1951.

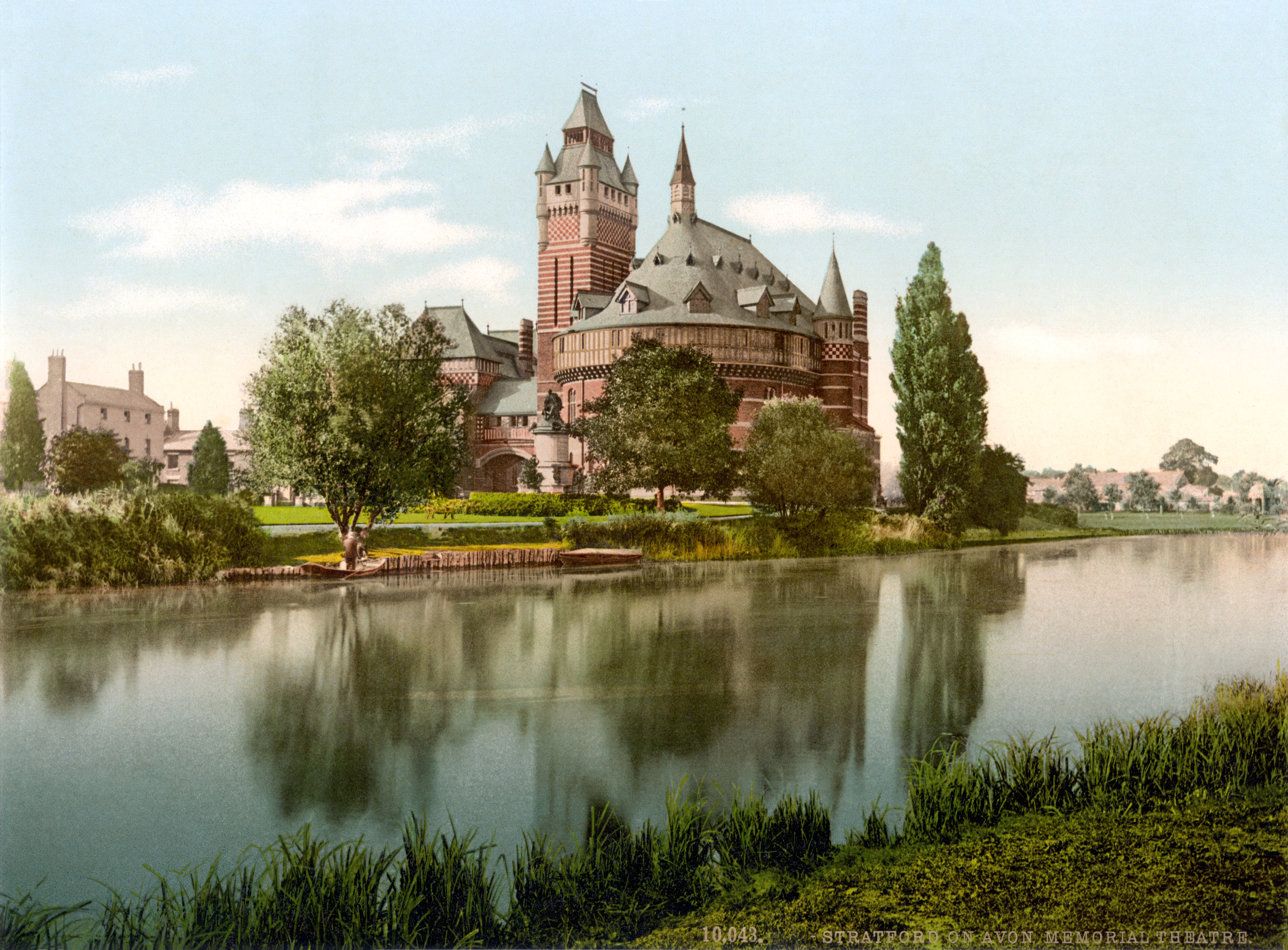
The Gower Monument in the gardens behind the Shakespeare Memorial Theatre
