= All Saints Church, Chadshunt =

Coordinates: 52.1744°N 1.4906°W

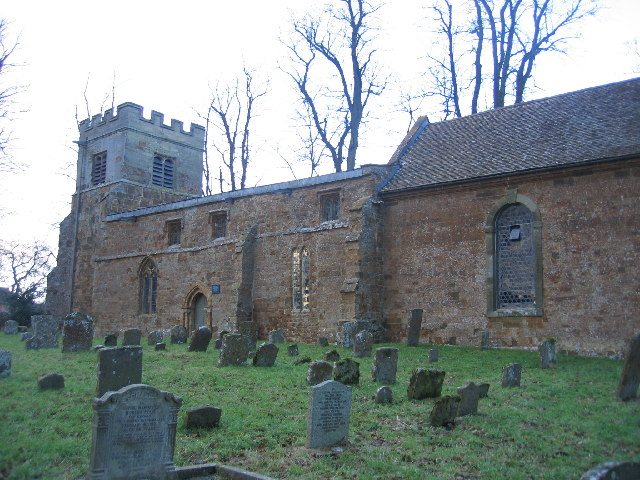
- All Saints Church, Chadshunt, from the southeast

- Location in Warwickshire
- OS grid reference: SP 349 530
- Location: Chadshunt, Warwickshire
- Country: England
- Denomination: Anglican
- Website: Churches Conservation Trust

History
- Dedication: All Saints

Architecture
- Functional status: redundant
- Architectural type: Church
- Style: Norman, Gothic
- Groundbreaking: Mid-12th century
- Completed: c. 1730

Specifications
- Materials: Ironstone, tile roofs

Listed Building – Grade II*
- Official name: Church of All Saints
- Designated: 30 May 1967
- Reference no.: 1035627

Scheduled monument
- Official name: Standing cross immediately south of All Saints Church
- Designated: 9 March 2001
- Reference no.: 1019662

All Saints Church is a redundant Anglican church in the parish of Chadshunt, Warwickshire, England. It is recorded in the National Heritage List for England as a designated Grade II* listed building, and is under the care of the Churches Conservation Trust. It stands by the side of the road from Kineton to Southam. Its general appearance is "long, low and massive".

== History ==
The earliest fabric in the church is in the eastern part of the nave which dates from the middle of the 12th century. The nave was lengthened towards the west in the 14th century. Early the following century a clerestory was added to the nave, the south wall was refaced, and buttresses were added. In the 17th century the west tower was built and in about 1730 the chancel and north transept were added. The roof was repaired in 1866, and a restoration was carried out in 1906. The church vested in the Churches Conservation Trust on 1 May 1988.

== Architecture ==
=== Exterior ===
The church is constructed in ironstone, with tiled roofs. Its plan consists of a three-bay nave with a clerestory, a single-bay chancel, a north transept, and a west tower. The approximate dimensions are: the nave 51 feet (15.5 m) by 18 feet (5.5 m), the chancel 13.5 feet (4.1 m) by 17 feet (5.2 m), and the transept 15 feet (4.6 m) by 14 feet (4.3 m). The roof of the chancel is higher than that of the nave. In the nave there are doors in the north and south walls of Norman origin. The north door has a round-headed arch, but the south door was altered in the 14th century, giving it a pointed arch. To the right of the south doorway is a buttress and a window of paired lancets, and to its left is a 14th-century two-light window. The clerestory has three straight-headed windows on each side; these are also paired lancets. On the east and west sides of the transept is a round-headed window, and in the north wall is a two-light window. In the east wall of the chancel is a Venetian window, and the south wall contains a round-headed window. The tower is in two stages with diagonal buttresses. On the west side of the lower stage is a door, above which is a two-light window. The upper stage contains a two-light louvred bell opening on each face. At the top of the tower is a moulded cornice and a crenellated parapet.

=== Interior ===
The roof of the nave is open. The tie beams are decorated with carvings, as are two of the stone corbels. The roof of the transept has a barrel roof, while the chancel has a coved and plastered ceiling. The chancel is paved with black marble and white stone. Around the wall of the chancel is a panelled, painted dado. The altar and chancel rails date from about 1730; they are in wrought iron, and the altar is partly gilt. In the south wall of the nave, below the easternmost window, is a 13th-century piscina in a niche with a trefoil head under a gable. All the stalls and pews date from the middle of the 19th century, and this is also the probable date of the family pew in the transept. Around the walls are memorials. The font is Norman in style and consists of a circular bowl on a moulded base. The bowl is carved with intersecting arcading, and its rim has dog-tooth motifs. The transept windows contain Flemish painted glass from the 18th century, set in glass dated 1855. There is a ring of six bells, all cast by Richard Keene of Woodstock in the 17th century, four in 1669, and the other two in 1693.

== External features ==
In the churchyard is the base of a churchyard cross, dating from the medieval period. It is constructed in ironstone and consists of an octagonal base and two steps and a square socket stone. It is listed at Grade II. Also in the churchyard are ten tombs, headstones, and groups of headstones, all of which are listed at Grade II.

== See also ==
- List of churches preserved by the Churches Conservation Trust in the English Midlands
