= Foxcote House =

Country house in England

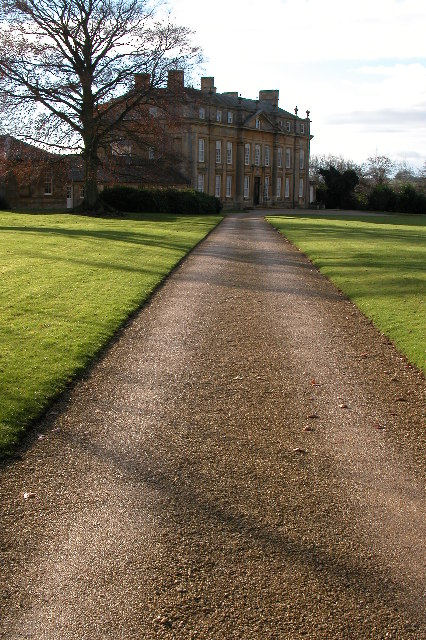
- Foxcote House from the driveway
- Interactive map of Foxcote House
- 52.074497°N 1.710569°W
- Location: Ilmington, Warwickshire, England

History
- Built: Early 18th century

Listed Building – Grade II*
- Official name: Foxcote House and archways
- Designated: 2 September 1952
- Reference no.: 1024118

Listed Building – Grade II
- Official name: Foxcote House former Roman Catholic chapel and attached cottage range linked to east of house
- Designated: 2 September 1952
- Reference no.: 1185343

Foxcote House is an 18th-century detached country house in the village of Ilmington, near Shipston-on-Stour in Warwickshire, England. It has been a Grade II* listed property since September 1952.

The house has 11 bedrooms, and five bathrooms, with a suite and two dressing rooms. It also has a large hall with a mezzanine gallery. The front of Foxcote House contains large gardens.

The house was constructed c., 1740; its design has been attributed to Edward Woodward. It was traditionally the family seat of the Canning family; ten generations of the Canning family resided at the house until the death of Robert Canning in 1848. Foxcote House was occupied by a private school before its purchase in the 1960s by Christopher Boot Holman, an heir of the pharmaceutical retail company Boots the Chemist. The Holmans restored the house, and it was sold by them in 1997 to the American billionaire Les Wexner. The 1997 sale price has been quoted as £3 million or £8 million. The Wexners attend the annual pheasant shooting season each October and host traditional British shooting parties in a former Catholic chapel that adjoins the house. The Foxcote House estate has been valued at £20 million.

The Wexners have refurbished the house and have purchased surrounding land to restore its estate. The Wexners are financial supporters of the Royal Shakespeare Company (RSC), and in a video tour of Foxcote House made for the international company of the RSC, it is stated that at the time of the Wexners' purchase, the top floor of the house had been sealed off for 50 years and the house was in a state of "complete dilapidation". In an interview with the Daily Telegraph, Sarah Holman, the daughter of Christopher Boot Holman, said that the Wexners "have spent a fortune on new windows and they have done lots of marvellous things" but that they had also turned the house into a "...glorified shooting lodge." It is not what I would have called "fabulous inside."
