= Chadshunt =

Village and civil parish in Warwickshire, England

Coordinates: 52°10′N 1°29′W

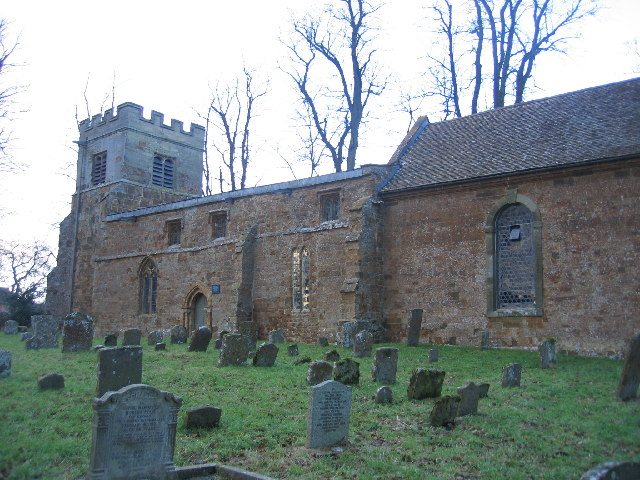
All Saints Church, Chadshunt

Chadshunt is a small village and civil parish in the Stratford-on-Avon district, in the county of Warwickshire, England. Chadshunt is located in between the villages of Gaydon and Kineton. It developed around the mill stream alongside Watery Lane. The former Yarlington Mill is now a private residence. Chadshunt has a church called All Saints Church.
