= St Leonard's Church, Spernall =

Coordinates: 52.2572°N 1.8748°W

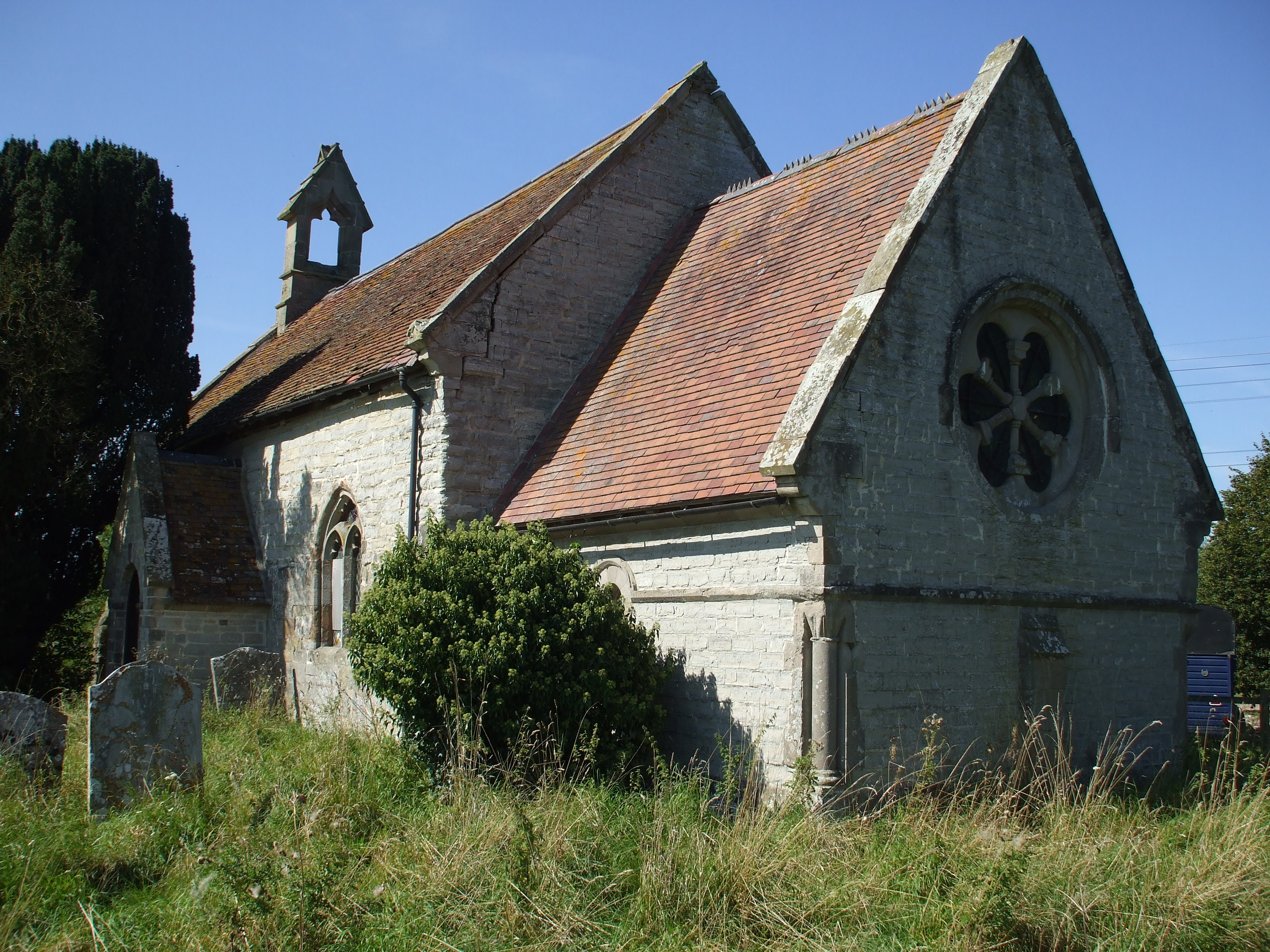
- St Leonard's Church, Spernall, from the southeast

- Location in Warwickshire
- OS grid reference: SP 086 621
- Location: Spernall, Warwickshire
- Country: England
- Denomination: Anglican
- Website: Friends of Friendless Churches

Architecture
- Functional status: Redundant
- Architectural type: Church
- Groundbreaking: 12th century
- Completed: c. 1844

Specifications
- Materials: Limestone with some brick and lias

Listed Building – Grade II*
- Official name: Church of St Leonard
- Designated: 1 February 1967
- Reference no.: 1024518

St Leonard's Church is a redundant church in Spernall, Warwickshire, England. It is recorded in the National Heritage List for England as a designated Grade II* listed building, and is under the care of the Friends of Friendless Churches.

== Early history ==
The first documentary evidence of the church is in the 1190s, and much of its fabric, including the chancel arch, and some of the glass, dates back to the 12th century. Additions and amendments were made in the 14th century. The northwest corner of the nave was rebuilt in brick in the 18th century. The porch was initially timber-framed, but was rebuilt in 1802 and again in 1847. In or around 1844 the chancel, and the bellcote were added. The bellcote replaced and earlier pyramidal cap. Oak seating and panelling were installed in the church in 1935.

== Architecture ==
The nave is constructed in limestone with some brick, and the chancel is in lias. The nave is roofed with old tiles, while the tiles roofing the chancel are from the 20th century. The plan of the church consists of a two-bay nave and a single-bay chancel, with a south porch that was used as a vestry. At the west end is a single Bell-cot. The chancel measures 12 feet 9 inches (3.89 m) by 10 feet 2 inches (3.10 m). The east window is a wheel window, and on the side walls are small round-headed windows. The nave measures 37 feet 3 inches (11.35 m) by 15 feet 10 inches (4.83 m) and contains two windows and a doorway in both the north and the south walls; the doorway in the south wall opens into a porch. At the west end is a two-light window. The communion rails date from the 18th century, while the font and other furnishings are later. The north door dates from 1535 and is described as "a work of national interest". The door was damaged in 1994 by vandals, but it still retains its original uprights and wooden tracery, and a ring pull set in a lion's mouth. At one time there was a sundial added in 1818, but this has disappeared. There is a single bell that was cast from the two bells present before the restoration of 1844. The church plate includes a cup hallmarked London 1655. The parish registers date from 1562, but are incomplete before 1666.

== Recent history and present day ==
The church was closed and declared redundant in 1972. The Diocese of Coventry applied to convert it into a house but this was declined and in 1976 the diocese applied for demolition. The Friends of Friendless Churches and the Ancient Monuments Society took an interest in conserving it. At the time the Friends of Friendless Churches did not have sufficient funds to purchase it, and on 29 August 1980 it was bought by the Ancient Monuments Society. It is the only church to have been owned by this society. Repairs undertaken at this time included the rebuilding of a section of the nave, and the re-roofing of the chancel; this cost £4,000. Further repairs were undertaken in 2004 which included reconstruction of the porch and bellcote, using original material as much as possible, and the re-roofing of part of the nave roof. This cost about £25,000 and was paid for by the Friends of Friendless Churches. Further work on the chancel was planned to take place in 2010. Since 1983 the artist Nicholas Jones has been using the church as a workshop.
