= Ilmington =

Village in Warwickshire, England

Coordinates: 52.090°N 1.693°W

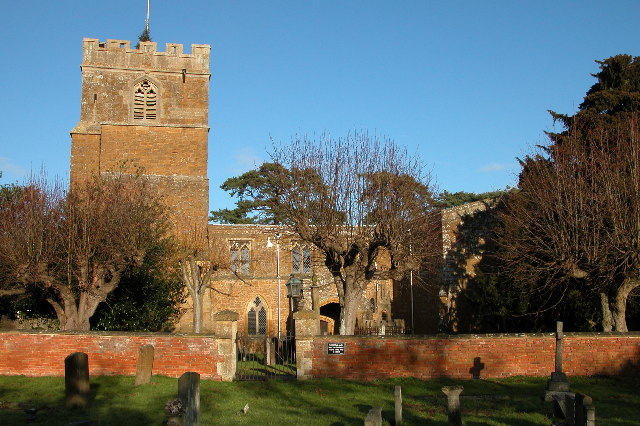
- St Mary the Virgin parish church

- Location within Warwickshire
- Population: 712 (2011 Census)
- OS grid reference: SP211435
- Civil parish: Ilmington
- District: Stratford-on-Avon
- Shire county: Warwickshire
- Region: West Midlands
- Country: England
- Sovereign state: United Kingdom
- Post town: Shipston-on-Stour
- Postcode district: CV36
- Dialling code: 01608
- Police: Warwickshire
- Fire: Warwickshire
- Ambulance: West Midlands
- Website: Ilmington – A Cotswold Village

Ilmington is a village and civil parish about 3.5 miles (5.6 km) north-west of Shipston-on-Stour and 8 miles (13 km) south of Stratford-upon-Avon in the Cotswolds in Warwickshire, England. The population of the civil parish taken at the 2011 census was 712. Ilmington is the highest village in Warwickshire and is at the foot of the Ilmington Downs, which is the highest point in Warwickshire. Residents are called "Ilmingtonians".

== History ==
In the 10th century the village's toponym was Ylmandunes in Old English. This evolved into Elmington because it had many elm trees. When Dutch Elm Disease came to England it killed the trees and now none remains in the village. The Elizabethan poet Sir Thomas Overbury was born at Compton Scorpion Manor, just south of the village. In 1934 the Royal Christmas Message broadcast by King George V was relayed worldwide from Ilmington Manor, home of the Flower family, and introduced by 65-year-old Walton Handy, a local shepherd, with carols from the church choir and bell ringing from the church. The early 18th-century Grade II* listed Foxcote House stands in the village. The house was the seat of the Canning family for many years, it is presently owned by the American lingerie billionaire Les Wexner.

== Parish church ==
The Church of England parish church of St Mary the Virgin is Norman and dates from about the middle of the 12th century. Its bell tower has five bells cast by Henry Bagley of Chacombe in 1641, plus three later bells added to make the present ring of eight. The Church of England parish is now part of a single benefice with the parishes of Tredington with Darlingscott, Preston-on-Stour, Stretton-on-Fosse and Whitchurch. It cannot be directly accessed by road but instead by a pathway. Robert Thompson of Kilburn carved the pulpit and pews for the church. He also carved his signature mice in eleven places throughout the church.

June Hobson was a gardener and artist who lived in the village. She inspired villagers to embroider the map that is a copy of old maps which showed where all of the orchards in the village were. It shows that there were an unusually large number of small orchards in the village. The Apple Map is displayed in the village church. Ilmington Apple Day starts with guided viewing of the Apple Map in the church before a search for some of the 38 different apple varieties grown in the village. Many people come to the Apple Days which celebrate the history of the small orchards in the village. The children at the local school devised the apple walk.

== Amenities ==
Ilmington has a Church of England primary school. It has a village hall, village shop and Post Office sharing the same building. Ilmington Revolution Football Club plays on Ilmington playing field. Ilmington has a Cotswold Morris dancing side. Ilmington has two public houses, The Howard Arms (a gastropub) and The Red Lion (Hook Norton Brewery).

== The Fifties ==
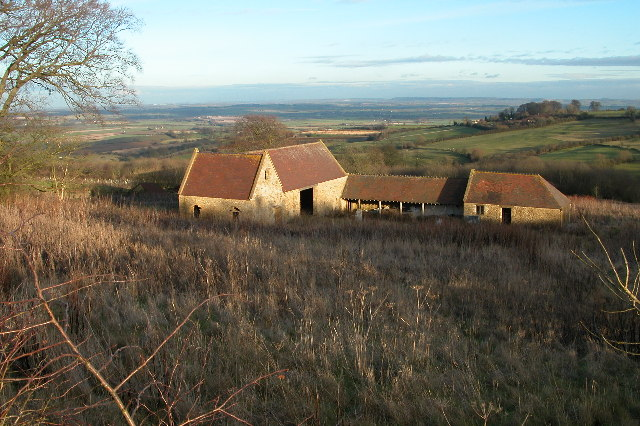
Stoke Hill Barn on the Ilmington Downs

A year-long project began in 2012 recording the memories of people who lived in Ilmington during the 1950s. These oral histories then provided the material for the creation of a play about village life in those days and the impact that events of national significance had on people's lives. This original piece of theatre coincided with the four-day countrywide celebrations to mark the Diamond Jubilee of Elizabeth II in June 2012. It was performed by actors from the village and was shared with audiences from the local community. The project, funded by the Heritage Lottery Fund, has a website that includes a series of recordings from the village's 50s residents.

== Notable residents ==
- Sir Thomas Overbury (1581 in Compton Scorpion – 1613) an English poet and essayist and famous murder victim.
- Dorothy Hodgkin, (1910–1994 in Ilmington) a Nobel Prize-winning British chemist and tutor of Prime Minister Margaret Thatcher

== Sources ==
- Anonymous (2003). 50 Walks in Warwickshire & the West Midlands. Basingstoke: AA Publishing. p. 66. ISBN 0-7495-3629-2.
- Pevsner, Nikolaus; Wedgwood, Alexandra (1966). Warwickshire. The Buildings of England. Harmondsworth: Penguin Books. pp. 316–317.
- Salzman, LF, ed. (1949). Victoria County History: A History of the County of Warwick, Volume 5: Kington Hundred. pp. 98–103.
