= Bath House, Walton Hall =

Building in Warwickshire, England

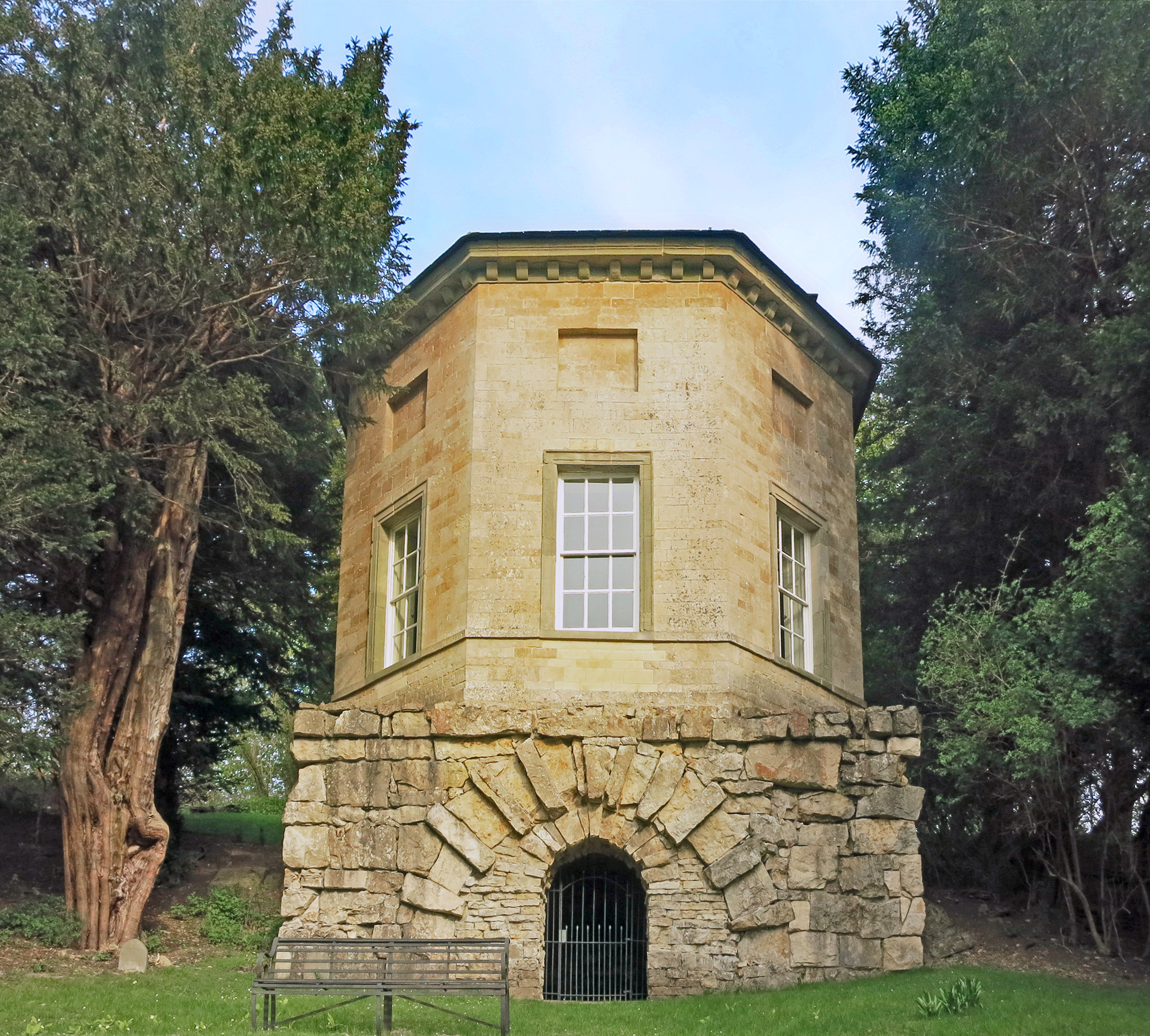
- Interactive map of Bath House, Walton Hall
- Location: Walton, Warwickshire, England
- Coordinates: 52.17220°N 1.57723°W

Listed Building – Grade II*
- Official name: The Bath House approximately 60 metres north east of Walton Hall
- Designated: 5 April 1967
- Reference no.: 1381987

The Bath House was built in 1748 for Sir Charles Mordaunt of the nearby Walton Hall mansion, near Stratford-upon-Avon in Warwickshire, England. It is listed at grade II*.

== Description ==
The Bath House was designed by the architect Sanderson Miller. As well as the bath chamber, the building incorporates an elegant octagonal room above, which was used by bathers to recover after their cold baths. The room is unusually decorated with icicle-like plaster work to the ceilings, and with sea shells set into the plasterwork decorating the walls. The shell decoration was by Mary Delaney. The building fell into disuse after the Second World War, and was subject to considerable vandalism. In 1987 the Landmark Trust leased the building and the trust restored it between 1987 and 1991. As of 2016, the building is used as holiday accommodation.
