= The Falcon Hotel =

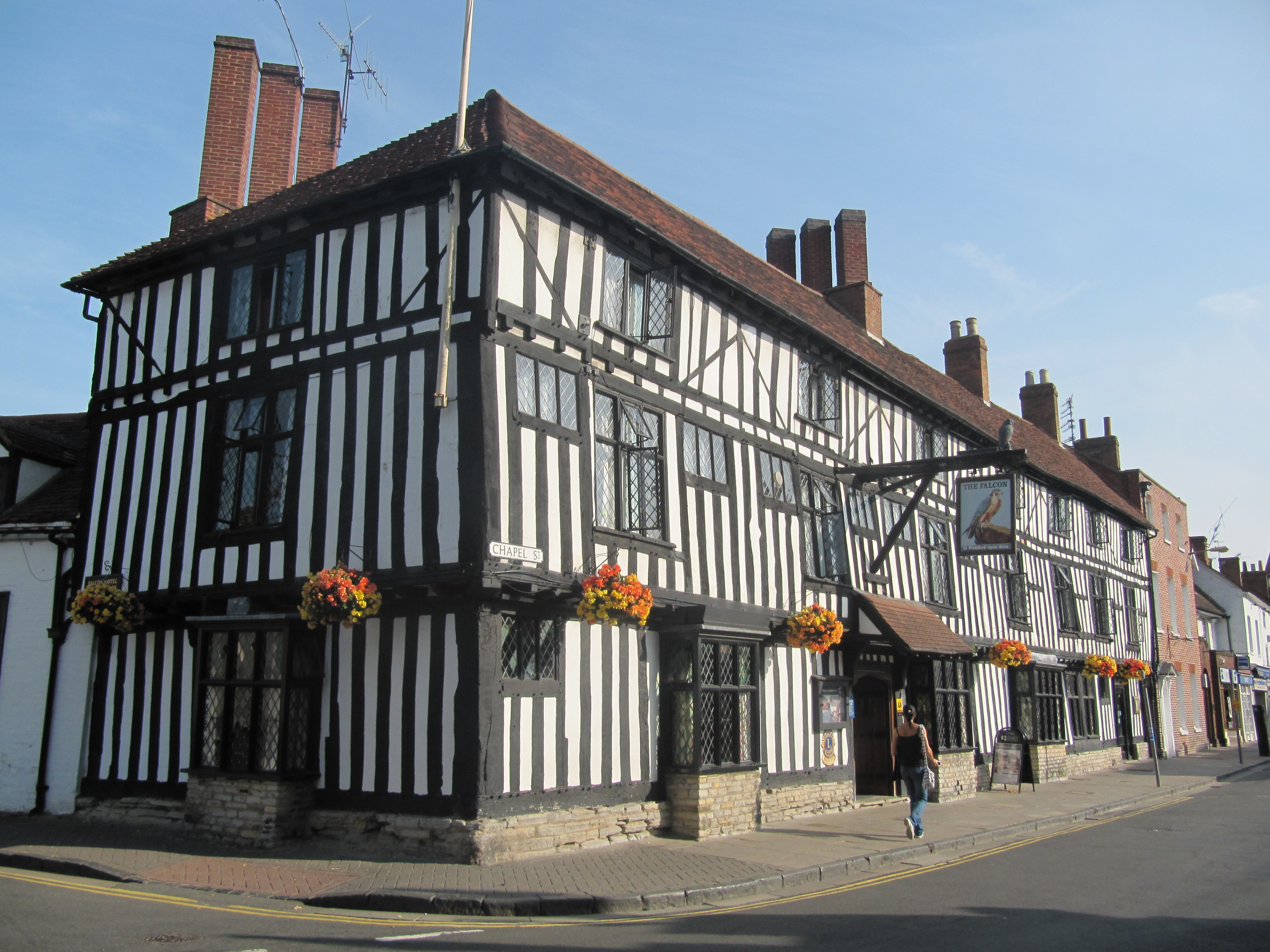
- Interactive map of The Falcon Hotel
- Location: 1–3 Chapel Street, Stratford-upon-Avon, Warwickshire, England
- Coordinates: 52.19071°N 1.70802°W
- Built: c. 1500–c. 1645
- Restored: 2017-2019

Listed Building – Grade II*
- Official name: The Falcon Hotel
- Designated: 25 October 1951
- Reference no.: 1187771

The Falcon Hotel (branded as the Hotel Indigo since 2019) is a grade II* listed hotel, with origins in the early 16th century on Chapel Street in the centre of Stratford-upon-Avon, Warwickshire, England.

The half-timbered building was originally a single storey house, built around 1500. The second floor was added around 1645. In 1655-61 it was recorded as an inn, which makes it the oldest continuously licensed premises in Stratford. From 1834, The Royal Shakespeare Club held its annual dinner there. It gained grade II* listing in 1951.

In 2014 the St James Hotel Group took ownership of the hotel, and in April 2017, began a major refurbishment of the building, employing specialist contractors, which took 18 months to complete. The building re-opened in January 2019 newly renamed as Hotel Indigo Stratford upon Avon. The re-naming of the historic hotel faced local opposition, with opponents arguing that it showed disrespect to the town’s history. However the owners of the hotel have stated that the Falcon name will be continued by the tea rooms at the front of the building, which will retain the Falcon name, and have a wooden Falcon sign hung outside.

Since its refurbishment, The hotel features 93 guest rooms, themed in either a Georgian townhouse, Tudor or contemporary style. Within the hotel is a restaurant called ‘The Woodsman’.

It is now part of the Hotel Indigo chain.
