= ABR =

Abr is a village in Iran.

Abr or ABR may also refer to:

== Media ==
- Adventure Bike Rider, a British motorcycling magazine
- Agência Brasil, a Brazilian public news agency
- American Book Review, a literary journal
- Australian Biblical Review, a theological journal
- Australian Book Review, a literary magazine

== People ==
- Abr Ahasani Gunnauri (1897–1973), Indian poet
- Addison Brown (1830–1913), American jurist and botanist (standard author abbreviation: A. Br.)

== Science and medicine ==
- ABR, RhoGEF and GTPase activating protein, a protein
- American Board of Radiology
- Auditory brainstem response
- Australia Bioinformatics Resource, a bioinformatics organisation

== Technology ==
- Adaptive bit rate, a method of video transmission
- Available bit rate, a service used in ATM networks
- Average bitrate
- Automatic baud rate detection
- Anaerobic baffled reactor, a type of decentralized wastewater system
- Area border router, in the Open Shortest Path First protocol

== Transport ==
- Abercynon North railway station, in South Wales
- Aberdeen Regional Airport, in South Dakota, US
- Abu Road railway station, Rajasthan, India
- ASL Airlines Ireland, a freight airline
- Assam Bengal Railway, a former railway in British India
- Athens Line, an American railroad

== Other uses ==
- Aegean Boat Report, a Norwegian NGO
- AB Bank Rwanda, a microfinance bank
- ABR Holdings, a Singaporean food company
- Agasthyamala Biosphere Reserve, in India
- Anti-Black racism
- August Burns Red, an American metalcore band
- Bono dialect, spoken in Ghana
- Australian Business Register, a government body that issues Australian Business Numbers
