= Dirty Duck =

Dirty Duck may refer to:

- Dirty Duck (comics), a character and underground comic book created by Bobby London
- Dirty Duck (Portland, Oregon)
- Down and Dirty Duck, the 1975 cult film produced by Roger Corman
- The Dirty Duck, a mystery novel written by Martha Grimes
- Dirty Duck (Coward Duck in older versions), a villain from the Metal Gear video game

== See also ==
- The Dirty Duck Ale House, a pub in Holywood, United Kingdom
- The Dirty Duck, Stratford-upon-Avon, a pub in Stratford-upon-Avon, United Kingdom
