= Waterside Theatre =

Coordinates: 52.1922°N 1.7043°W

The Waterside Theatre was an independent theatre/arts venue overlooking the Stratford Canal in Stratford-upon-Avon, Warwickshire, England. It was bankrupted after flood damage and the building has been taken over by the Royal Shakespeare Company, first as the Waterside Space and now as the Clore Learning Centre.

== History ==
The theatre was opened on 29 May 1979 by Princess Anne, and has been part of the town for many years, once housing the town's first cinema. The building was also home for many years to an audio-visual presentation visitor attraction, The World of Shakespeare. After the closure of The World of Shakespeare, the Waterside Theatre lay empty before re-opening in December 2004.

The theatre then hosted Shakespearience, a visitor attraction aimed to both celebrate and introduce newcomers to Shakespeare's world and works. Both closed in September 2008.

== Theatre ==
The theatre building is styled like an Elizabethan-style playhouse, authentically timbered similar to The Globe Theatre in London.

Famous faces to have graced the stage in the past include: Judi Dench, Robin Ince, King Pleasure and The Biscuit Boys, Alistair McGowan, Simon Callow and ex-Radio 1 DJ Normski.
