= Stratford-upon-Avon =

Town in Warwickshire, England

Coordinates: 52°11′34″N 01°42′23″W

- Town
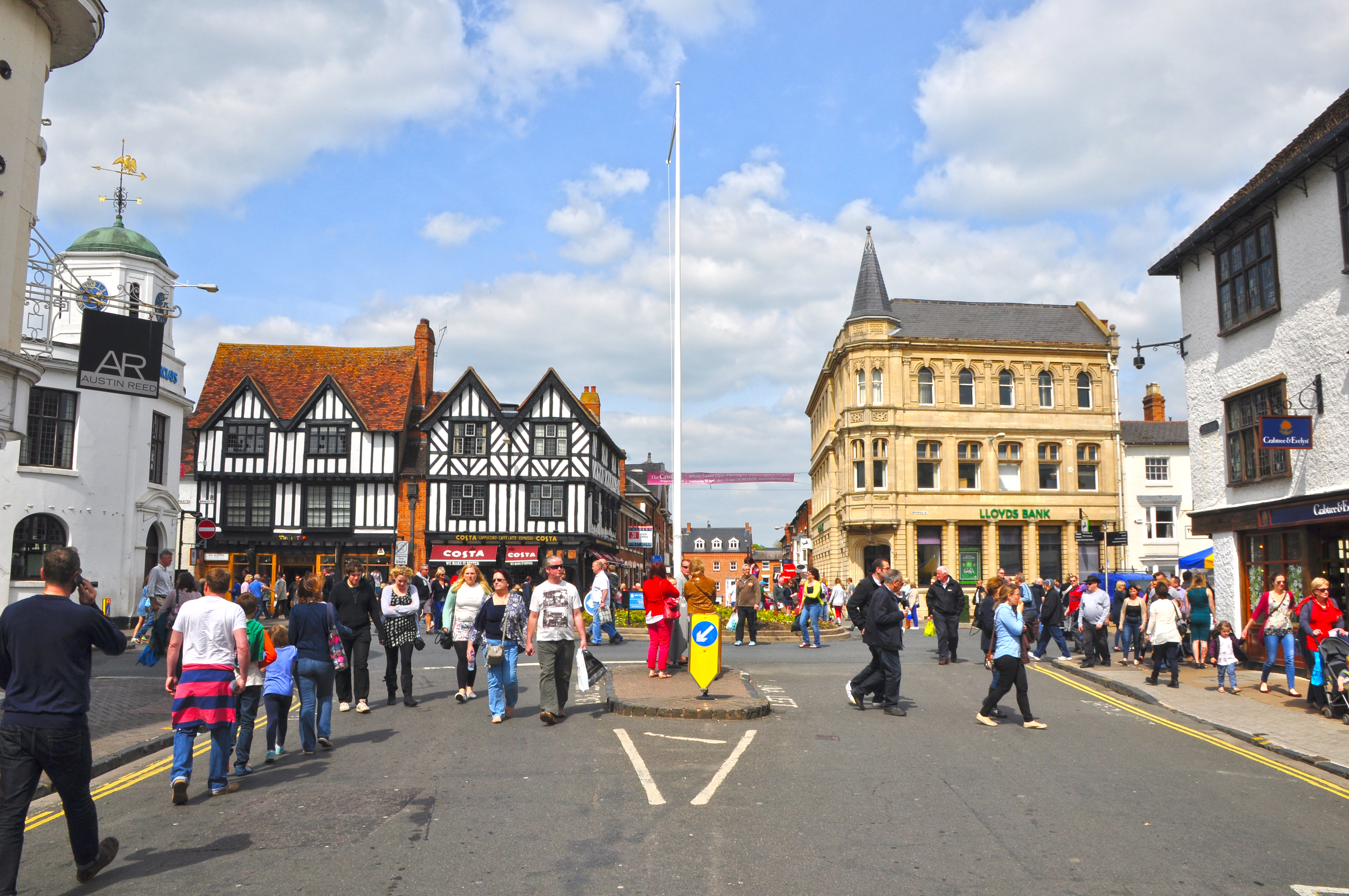
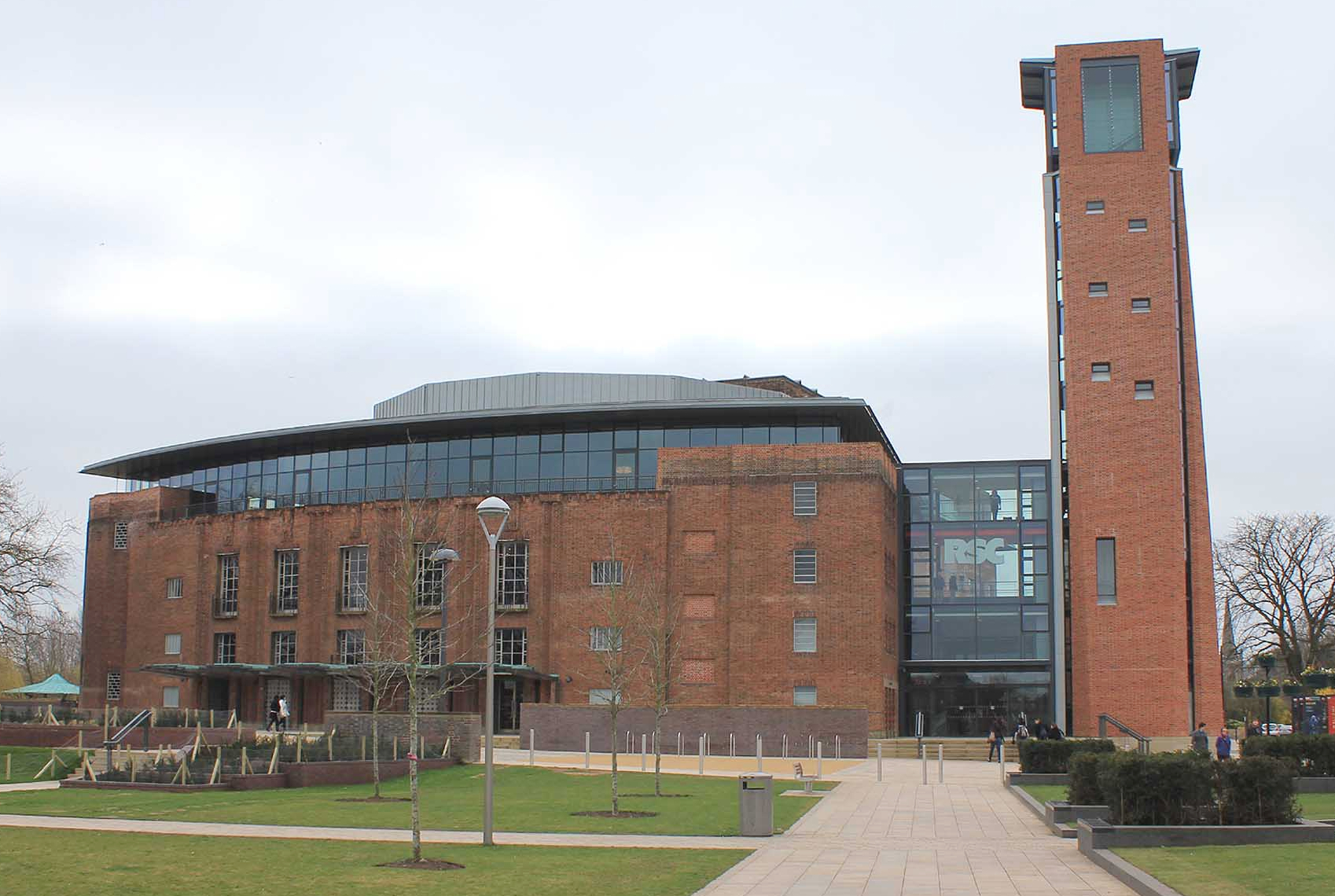
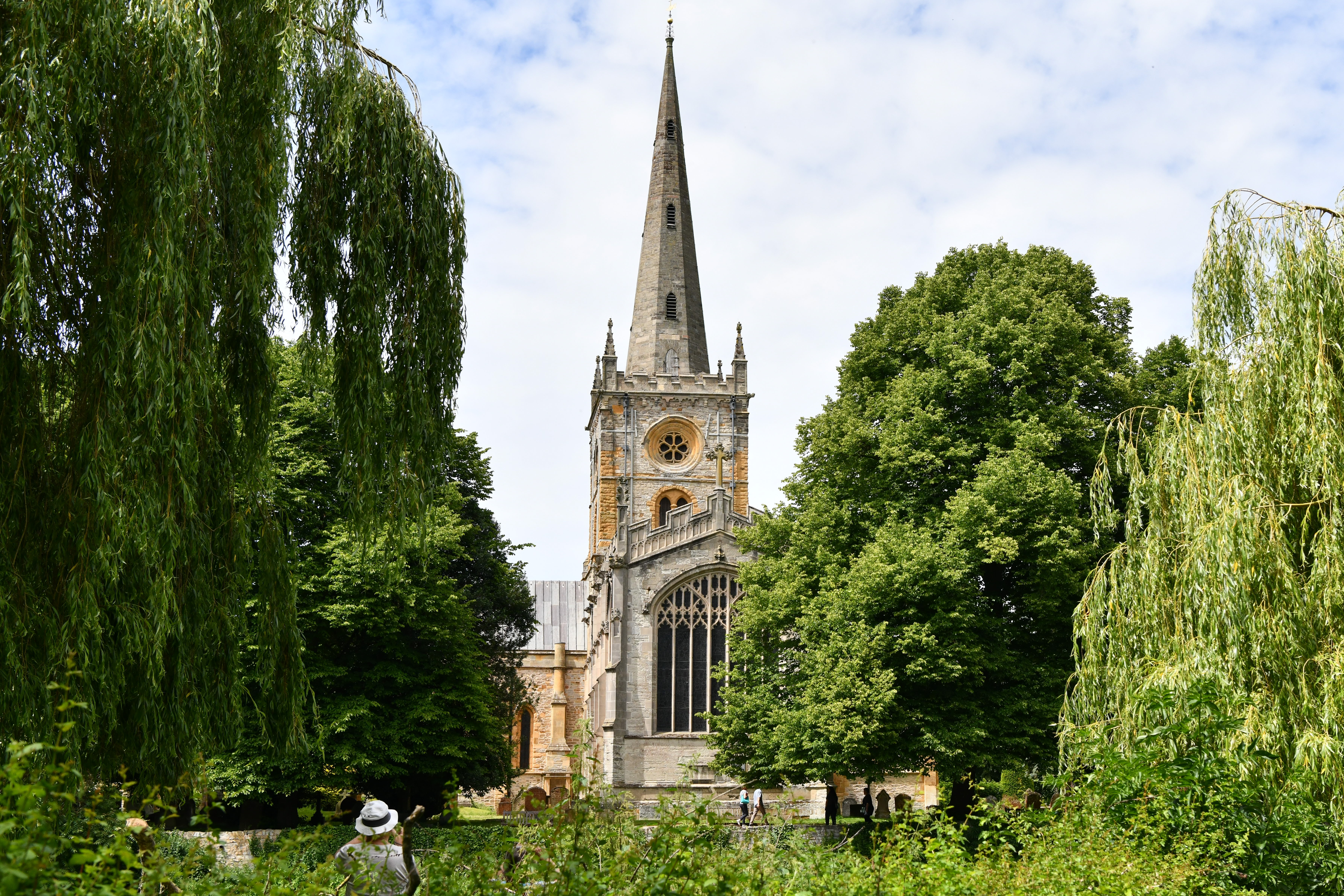
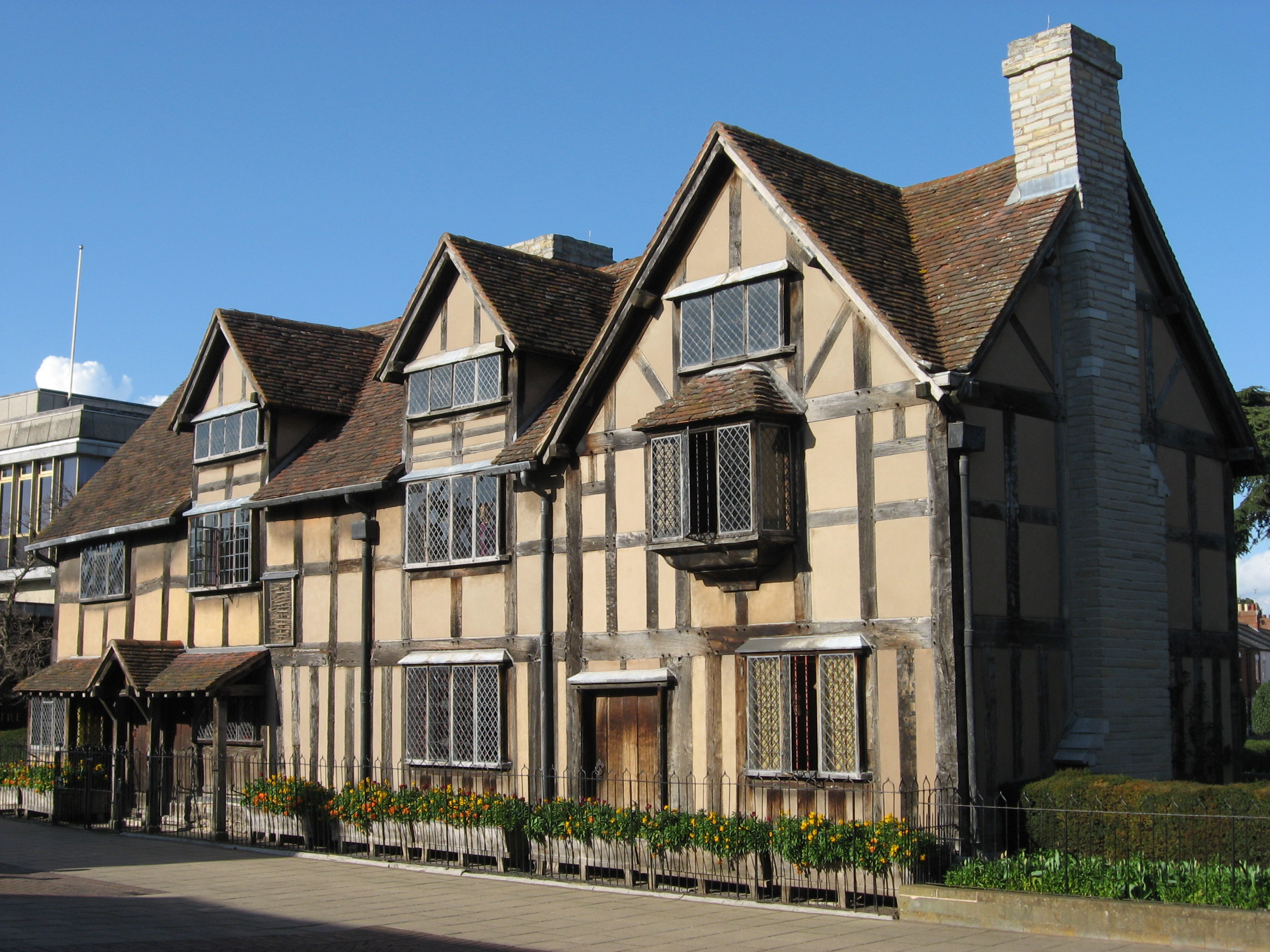
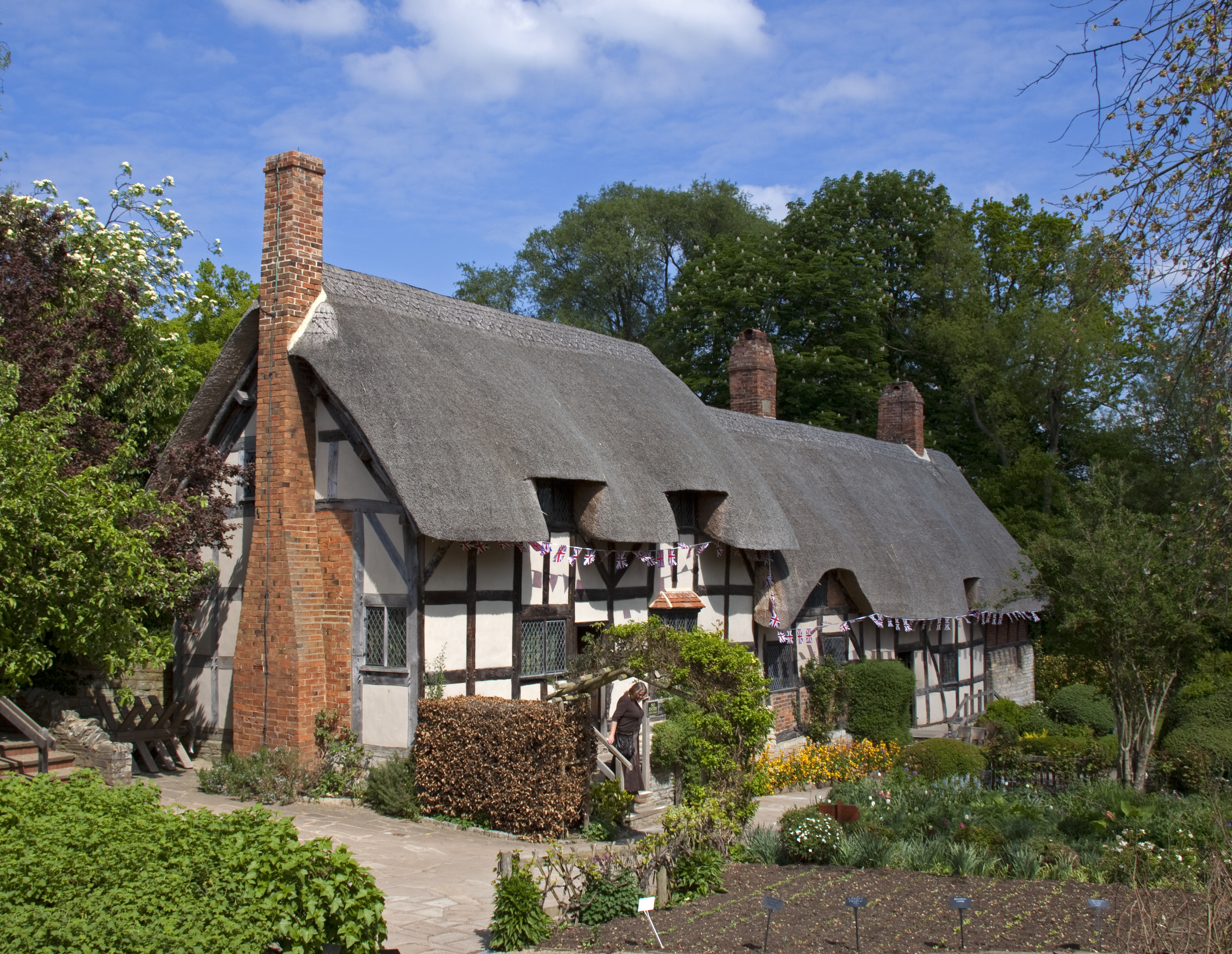
- Town Centre from the end of High Street Royal Shakespeare Theatre Holy Trinity Church Shakespeare's Birthplace Anne Hathaway's Cottage

- Location within Warwickshire
- Population: 30,495 (2021 census)
- Demonym: Stratfordian
- OS grid reference: SP1955
- Civil parish: Stratford-upon-Avon
- District: Stratford-on-Avon
- Shire county: Warwickshire
- Region: West Midlands
- Country: England
- Sovereign state: United Kingdom
- Post town: STRATFORD-UPON-AVON
- Postcode district: CV37
- Dialling code: 01789
- Police: Warwickshire
- Fire: Warwickshire
- Ambulance: West Midlands
- UK Parliament: Stratford-on-Avon

Stratford-upon-Avon (/ ... ˈeɪvən/ ... AY-vən), also known simply as Stratford, is a market town and civil parish in the Stratford-on-Avon District, in the county of Warwickshire, in the West Midlands region of England. It is situated on the River Avon, 91 miles (146 km) north-west of London, 22 miles (35 km) south-east of Birmingham and 8 miles (13 km) south-west of Warwick. The town is the southernmost point of the Arden area at the northern extremity of the Cotswolds. At the 2021 census Stratford had a population of 30,495.

Stratford was inhabited originally by Britons before Anglo-Saxons and remained a village before the lord of the manor, John of Coutances, set out plans to develop it into a town in 1196. In that same year, Stratford was granted a charter from King Richard I to hold a weekly market in the town, giving it its status as a market town. As a result, Stratford experienced an increase in trade and commerce as well as urban expansion.

Stratford is a popular tourist destination, owing to being the birthplace and burial place of the playwright and poet William Shakespeare, who is widely regarded as the national poet of England. It receives approximately 2.7 million visitors a year. The Royal Shakespeare Company resides in the Royal Shakespeare Theatre.

== Etymology ==
The name is a combination of the Old English strǣt (from Latin stratum), meaning 'street', ford, indicating a shallow part of a river or stream, allowing it to be crossed by walking or driving, and avon which is a Celtic word for river (Welsh: afon). The 'street' was a Roman road which connected Icknield Street in Alcester to the Fosse Way. The ford, which has been used as a crossing since Roman times, later became the location of Clopton Bridge.

A survey of 1251–52 uses the name Stratford for the first time to identify Old Stratford and the newer manors. The name was used after that time to describe the area specifically surrounding the Holy Trinity Church and the street of the Old Town.

== History ==
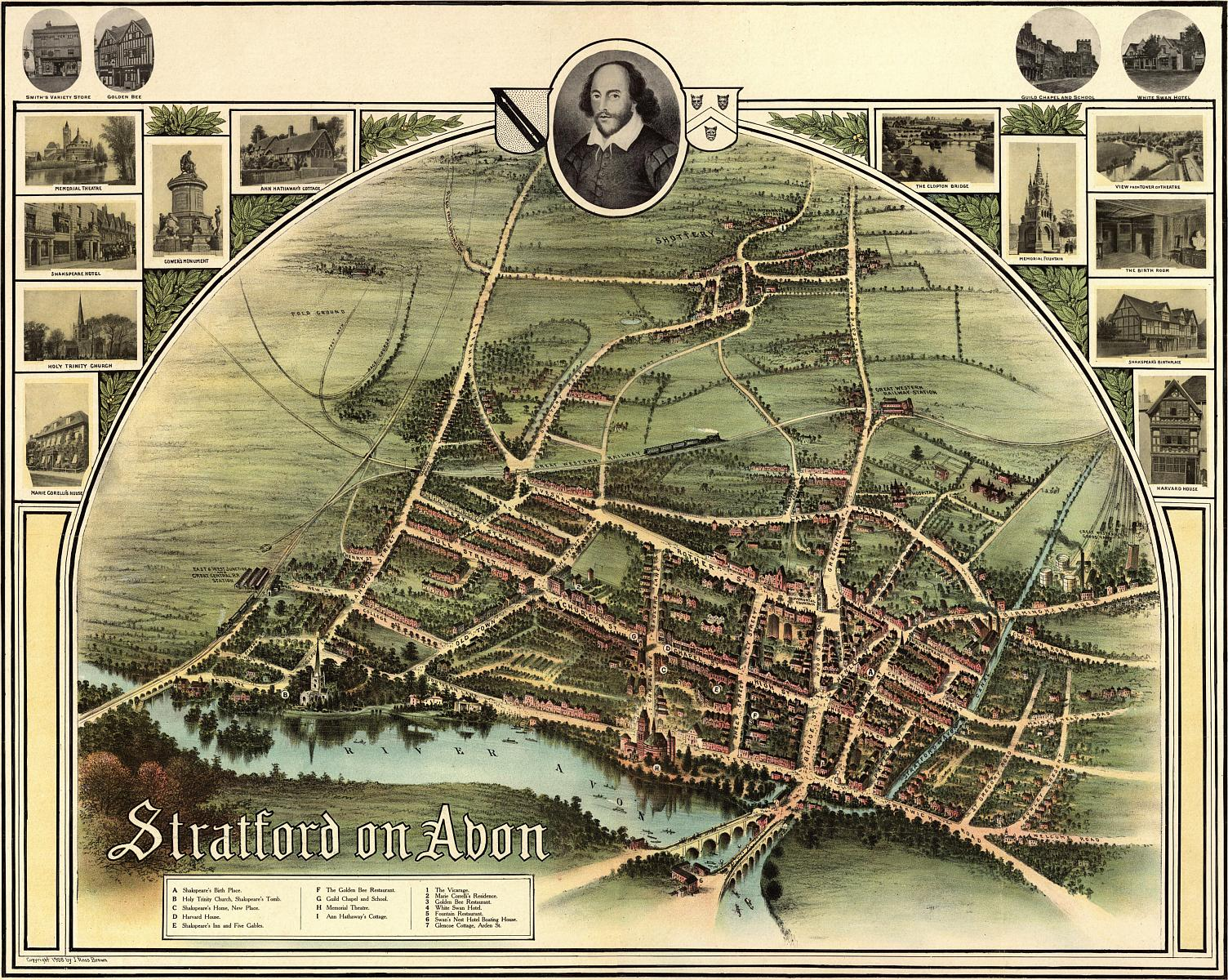
Illustrated map of Stratford, c. 1908

=== Roman ===
The Stratford area was settled during the Roman period as the area was crossed by a Roman road: archaeological remains of a small Roman town have been found, about 1 mile (1.6 km) northeast of Stratford town centre at Tiddington, now part of Stratford, which was occupied from the 1st to the 5th century AD. The remains of two further probable Roman settlements have been found within a few miles of modern-day Stratford.

=== Medieval ===
Oftfor, bishop of Worcester from 691 to 693, preached to the Hwicca tribe who inhabited south Warwickshire (then Mercia), and it has been argued that it was during this mission that a monastery was founded at Stratford. The earliest reference to the monastery comes from a charter in which Egwin (third bishop of Worcester) acquired a religious house at Aet-Stratford, which may have been on the site of the Church of the Holy Trinity. The rights of the bishops of Worcester to Stratford were confirmed by Offa in 781.

The monastery was likely destroyed by Viking invaders in 1015. The land remained in the ownership of the bishops of Worcester until the 16th century. The area around Holy Trinity Church is still known as Old Town as it was the original area of settlement around the monastery. The focus of the settlement at Stratford was later moved north, closer to the river crossing, which was better positioned for trade.

Stratford, then referred to as strete ford, remained a village until the late 12th century when it was developed into a town by the lord of the manor, Bishop John of Coutances. He laid out a new town in 1196 around 1/2 mile (0.80 km) north of the original settlement, based on a grid system to expand Stratford and allow people to rent property in order to trade within the town. Coutances granted his new tenants the right to rent property and transmit it at death; this was called burgage tenure. Each development plot or "burgage" consisted of around 0.25 acres (0.10 hectares). A charter was granted to Stratford by King Richard I in 1196 which allowed a weekly market to be held in the town, giving it its status as a market town. These two charters, which formed the foundations of Stratford's transformation from a village to a town, make the town of Stratford over 800 years old: the town celebrated its 800th anniversary in 1996.

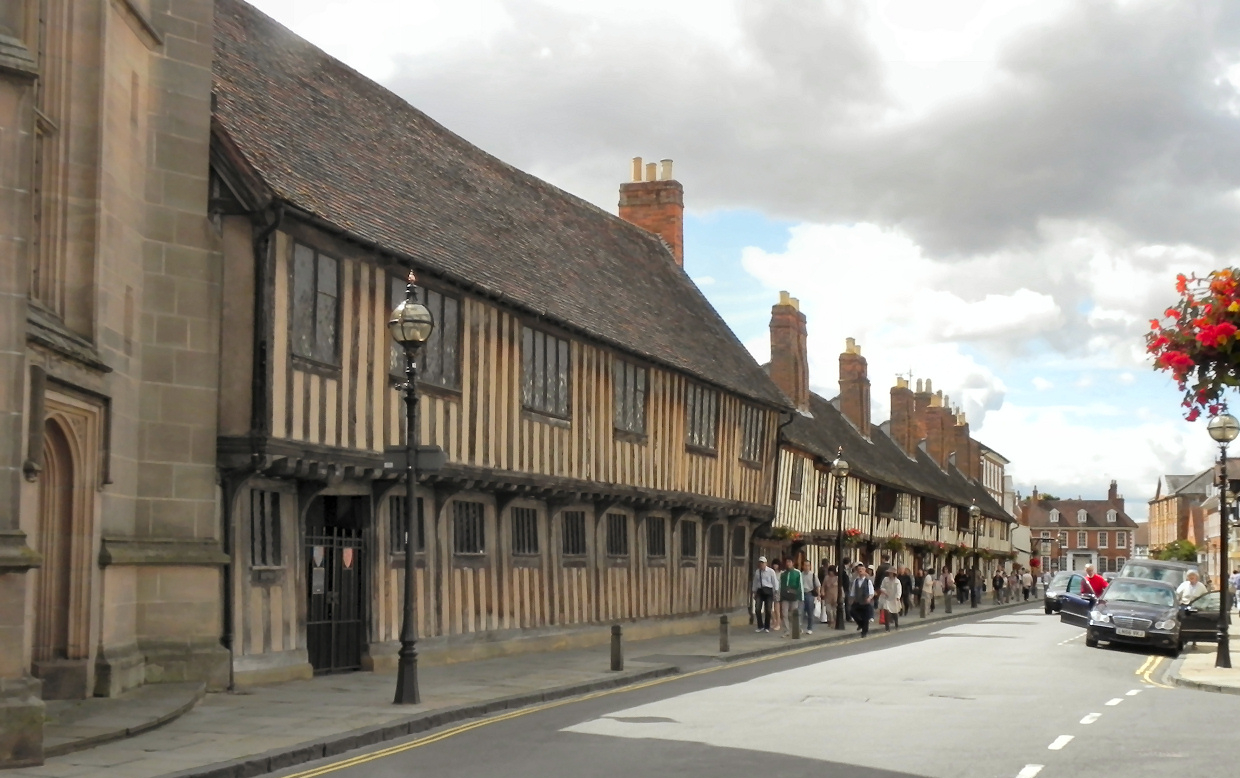
The early-15th century Guildhall and Almshouses on Church Street

John of Coutances' plans to develop Stratford into a town meant it became a place of work for tradesmen and merchants. By 1252 the town had approximately 240 burgages (town rental properties owned by a king or lord), as well as shops, stalls and other buildings. Stratford's tradesmen established the Guild of the Holy Cross for their business and religious requirements. The guild developed into the town's main institution of local government, and included the most important townsmen, who elected officials to oversee local affairs. They built a Guild Chapel in the 13th century, and a Guildhall and almshouses on Church Street in around 1417. The guild established an educational institution in the late 13th century.

Many of the town's earliest and most important buildings are along what is known as Stratford's Historic Spine, which was once the main route from the town centre to the parish church. The route of the Historic Spine begins at Shakespeare's Birthplace in Henley Street. It continues through Henley Street to the top end of Bridge Street and into the High Street where many Elizabethan buildings are found, including Harvard House. The route carries on through Chapel Street past Nash's House and New Place. Opposite New Place was The Falcon Hotel (now Hotel Indigo), at the corner of Scholars Lane. It is a timber-framed house with nearly 100-ft frontage to the street and dating perhaps from the end of the 15th century. The Historic Spine continues along Church Street where there are Guild buildings from the 15th century, as well as 18th- and 19th-century properties. The route finishes in the Old Town, which includes Hall's Croft and the Holy Trinity Church.

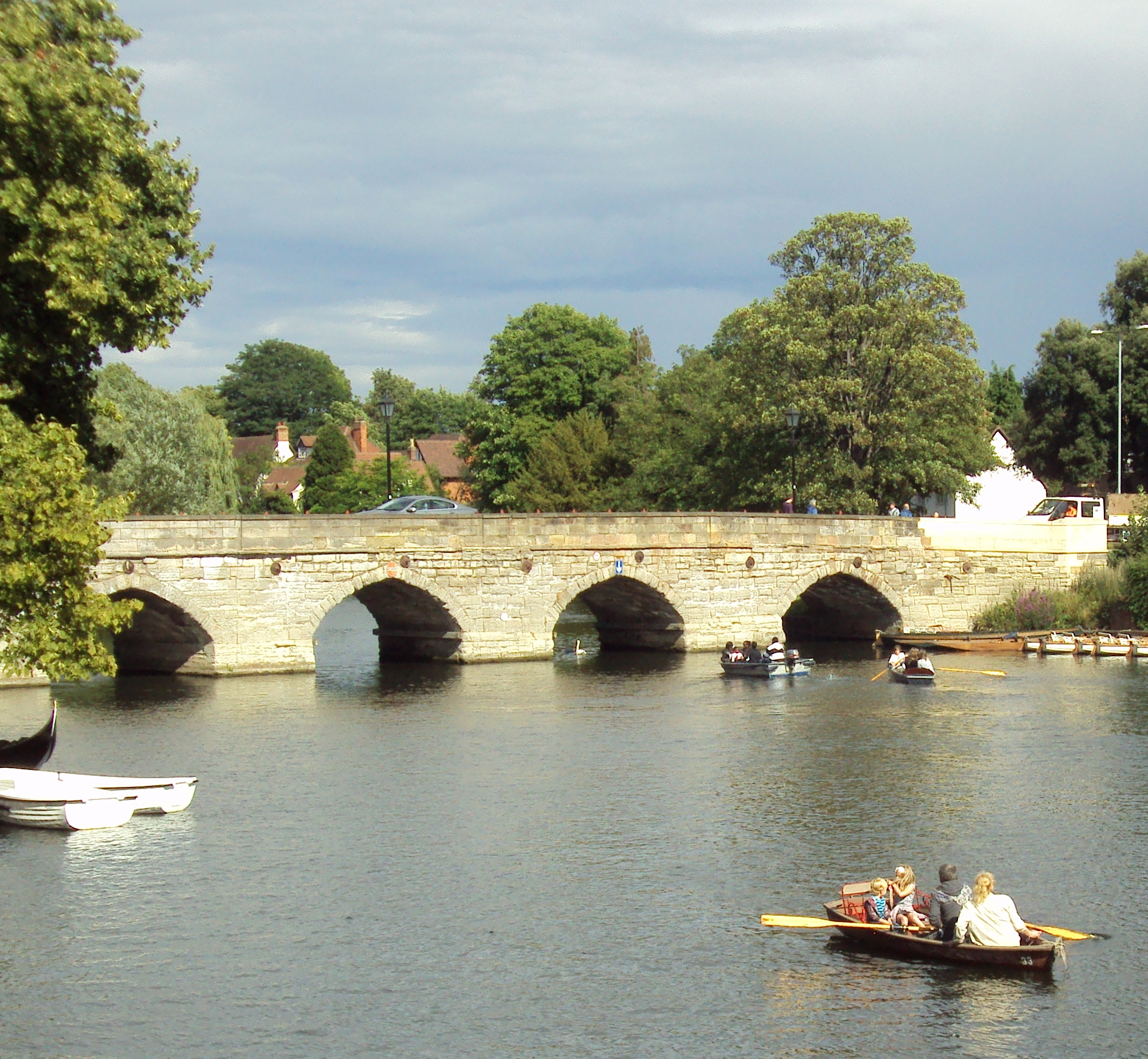
Clopton Bridge allowed trade to flourish in Stratford.

During Stratford's early expansion into a town, the only access across the River Avon into and out of the town was over a wooden bridge, which was first mentioned in 1235. The bridge could not be crossed at times due to the river rising and was described by antiquarian John Leland as "a poor bridge of timber and no causeway to it, whereby many poor folks and other refused to come to Stratford when the Avon was up, or coming thither stood in jeopardy of life." In 1484, a masonry arch bridge was built to replace it called Clopton Bridge, named after Hugh Clopton, a wealthy local man who paid for its construction and later became Lord Mayor of London. The new bridge made it easier for people to trade within Stratford and for passing travellers to stay in the town.

=== Tudor period ===
The medieval structures of local governance underwent significant changes during the Tudor period: The Guild of the Holy Cross was abolished in 1547 under King Edward VI's suppression of religious guilds, and the inhabitants of Stratford petitioned the Crown for a charter of incorporation as a borough, which they received in 1553. This allowed the formation a new Town Council which inherited the property and responsibilities of the abolished guild. The Charter of Incorporation refounded Stratford's school as the King Edward VI School.

The Cotswolds, located close to Stratford, was a major sheep-producing area up until the latter part of the 19th century, with Stratford one of its main centres for the processing, marketing, and distribution of sheep and wool. Consequently, Stratford became a centre for tanning during the 15th–17th centuries. Glove making was an important industry, which was at its zenith in the 15th and 16th centuries. As was malting, the processing of grain to turn it into malt.

John Shakespeare, originally a farmer, had moved to Stratford in 1551, from the nearby village of Snitterfield and became a successful glover (glove maker) and businessman, and an official on the Town Council. He met and married Mary Arden a member of the local gentry in around 1557. Together they had eight children, including Stratford's most famous son William Shakespeare in 1564, believed to be at the house now known as Shakespeare's Birthplace.

=== 17th and 18th centuries ===
Stratford was the centre of considerable activity and some fighting during the English Civil War. Being located at the junction of several main roads, it was strategically important for both the Royalist and Parliamentarian armies. Due to its close proximity to the Parliamentarian stronghold of Warwick, Stratford remained under Parliamentarian control for the majority of the conflict, although it was only directly occupied by troops for sporadic intervals. In February 1643, Stratford was occupied by Royalist forces under Colonel Wagstaffe.

It was recaptured by Parliamentarians under Lord Brooke on 25 February after an engagement on the nearby road to Warwick. Having secured the town, Brooke returned to Warwick. In one notable incident in February 1643, Stratford's Market Hall, at the site of the current Town Hall, was destroyed after three barrels of gunpowder which were being stored there blew up. From March 1644, until part of the following year, Stratford appears to have been continuously occupied by Parliamentarian troops. There was one further Royalist raid in April 1645.

A number of famous people passed through Stratford during the conflict, such as Prince Rupert in April 1643. He was at Stratford again in July of that year, when he met the Queen Henrietta Maria, who was travelling through the Midlands and was the guest of honour of Susanna Hall, William Shakespeare's daughter, at New Place. Oliver Cromwell was at Stratford in December 1646, and again in 1651, before the Battle of Worcester.

Despite Stratford's increase in trade, it barely grew between the middle of the 13th century and the end of the 16th century, with a survey of the town showing 217 houses belonged to the lord of the manor in 1590. Growth continued to be slow throughout the 17th century, with hearth tax returns showing that at most there were approximately 429 houses in the town by 1670. However, more substantial expansion began following several inclosure acts in the late 18th century, with the first and largest development by John Payton who developed land on the north side of the old town, creating several streets including John Street and Payton Street.

In 1769, the actor David Garrick staged a major Shakespeare Jubilee over three days which saw the construction of a large rotunda and the influx of many visitors. This contributed to the growing phenomenon of Bardolatry which made Stratford a tourist destination.

Before the dominance of road and rail, Stratford was an important gateway to the network of British canals. The River Avon was made navigable through Stratford in 1639, by the construction of locks and weirs, providing Stratford with a navigable link to the River Severn to the south-west and to near Warwick to the north-east, this allowed, in the words of Daniel Defoe "a very great Trade for Sugar, Oil, Wine, Tobacco, Iron, Lead and in a word, all heavy goods which are carried by water almost as far as Warwick; and in return the corn, and especially the cheese, is brought back from Gloucestershire and Warwickshire to Bristol".

=== 19th century to present ===
Between 1793 and 1816 the Stratford-upon-Avon Canal was built, linking the Avon at Stratford with Birmingham. By the early 19th century, Stratford was a flourishing inland port, and an important centre of trade, with many canal and river wharves along what is now Bancroft Gardens.

The first railway in Warwickshire; the Stratford and Moreton Tramway was opened to Stratford in 1826: this was a horse-drawn wagonway, 16 miles (26 km) long, which was intended to carry goods between the Stratford-upon-Avon Canal, the rural districts of south Warwickshire and Moreton-in-Marsh. The tramway fell into disuse by the early 1900s, and the tracks were lifted in 1918. A surviving remnant of this is the Tramway Bridge over the River Avon, a brick arch bridge which now carries pedestrians.

The first steam railway to reach Stratford was a branch of the Oxford, Worcester and Wolverhampton Railway from Honeybourne to the south, which opened in July 1859. This was followed by the Stratford on Avon Railway's branch from Hatton from the north, which opened in October 1860. Both branches initially had separate termini, but they soon agreed to join the two branches and open the current Stratford-upon-Avon railway station, which was opened in July 1861. Both branches later came under the control of the Great Western Railway. The connection of Stratford to the growing national railway network, helped enable the development of the modern tourism industry.

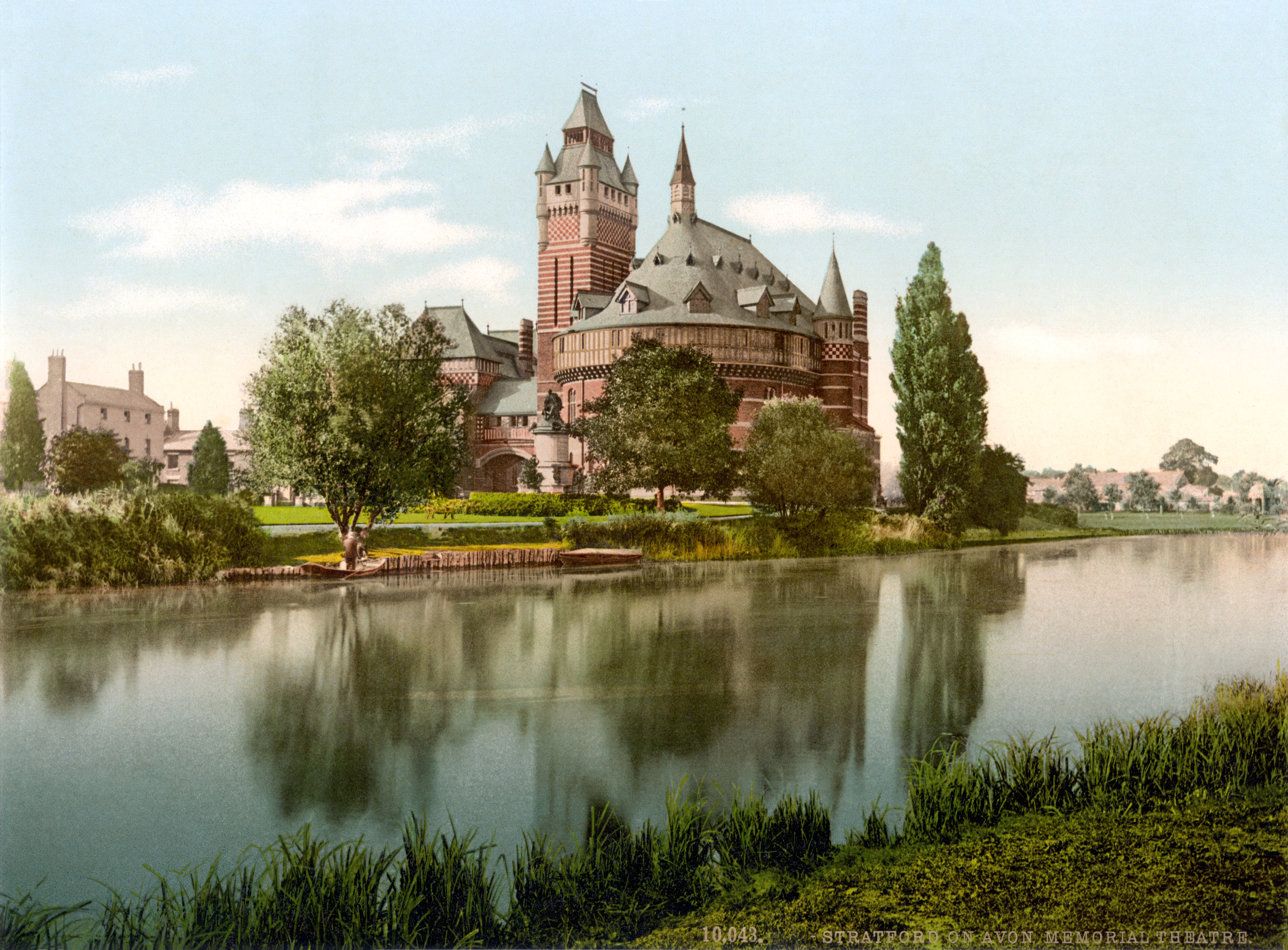
The original Shakespeare Memorial Theatre of 1879

Stratford did not become a major centre of industry during the Industrial Revolution, but some industries did grow up locally: Edward Fordham Flower opened a large canal side brewery in Stratford in 1831. The Flower & Sons Brewery, on Clopton Road survived until 1967, when the company was taken over by Whitbread. Several lime kilns were opened locally, and the manufacture of tarpaulin and oilcloth flourished. The advent of rail transport in the middle of the century caused a major decline in river and canal transport, and the River Avon navigation through Stratford was abandoned in 1875. It was restored as a navigation by volunteers almost a century later in 1974.

Victorian Stratford's growth as a tourist destination was further enhanced by Edward Fordham Flower and his son Charles Edward Flower, owners of a local brewery business, and important figures in local affairs: Through their campaigning and fundraising efforts, the Shakespeare Memorial Theatre was opened on the banks of the Avon in 1879. The original theatre was destroyed by fire in 1926. Its replacement was opened in 1932, designed by Elisabeth Scott, making it the first important building by a woman architect erected in Britain.

In 1974, the ancient borough of Stratford was abolished and merged into the much larger Stratford-on-Avon District, and the area of the borough became a successor parish with a town council. That council inherited two long-standing charities, the Guild and College estates, that own property in the town; these assets were transferred to the Stratford Town Trust charity which (as of 2025) awards grants totalling over £2 million each year to the local community.

== Governance ==
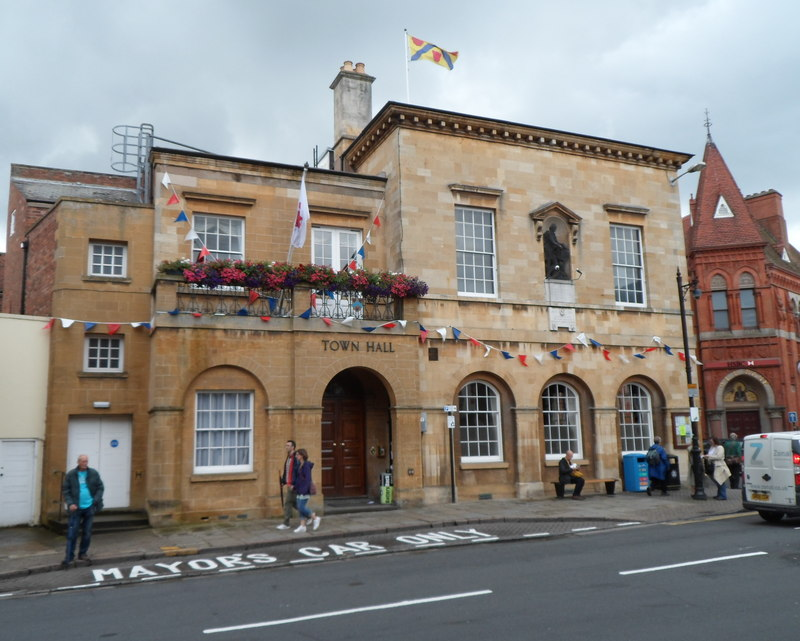
Stratford-upon-Avon Town Hall, home to Stratford-upon-Avon Town Council

Stratford-upon-Avon is within the Stratford-on-Avon parliamentary constituency which has been represented by Manuela Perteghella of the Liberal Democrats since 2024. Stratford was within the West Midlands Region constituency of the European Parliament which was represented by seven Members of the European Parliament (MEPs). Stratford is governed by three tiers of local government:

- County-level: Warwickshire County Council is a non-metropolitan county council, responsible for education, highways and other strategic matters.
- District-level: Stratford-on-Avon District Council is responsible for housing, planning, rubbish collection and other local matters in Stratford and neighbouring towns and villages. The council is based at Elizabeth House, Church Street.
- Parish-level: Stratford-upon-Avon Town Council is a parish council, responsible for crime prevention, cemeteries, public conveniences, litter, river moorings, parks, grants via the Town Trust and the selection of the town's mayor. The Town Council is based at the Town Hall in Sheep Street. The council serves the civil parish and has 18 members, elected from 12 wards. The parish absorbed Old Stratford and Drayton in March 2015.

== Geography ==
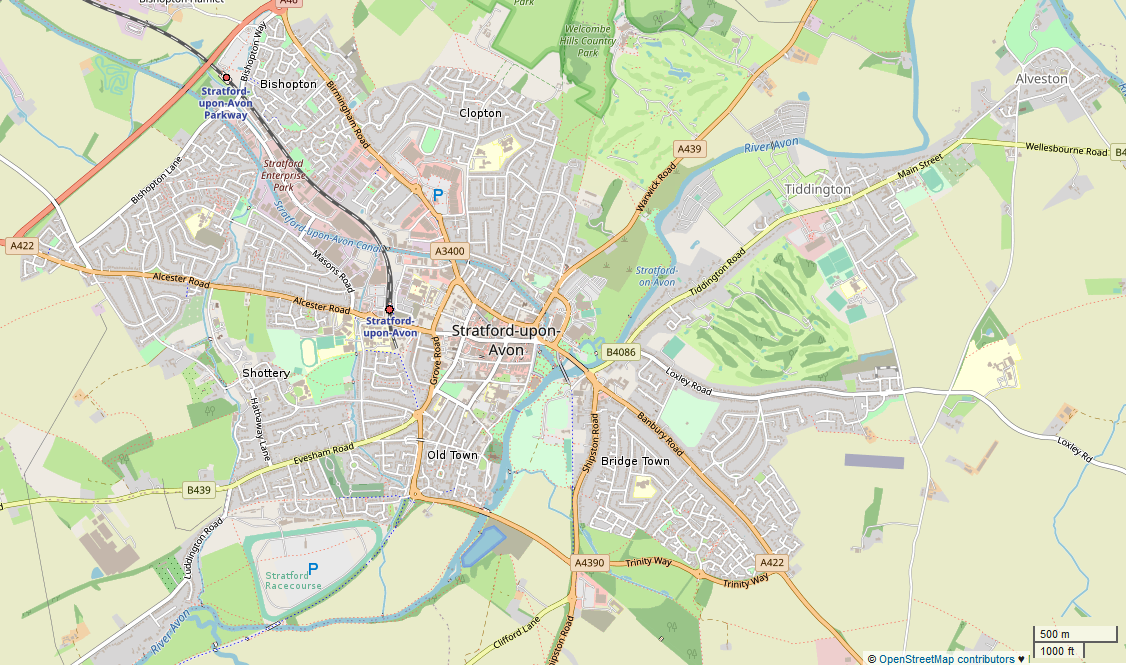
A map of Stratford

Stratford is 22 miles (35 km) south-east of Birmingham. It is close to the northern edge of the Cotswolds, with Chipping Campden 10 miles (16 km) to the south. Stratford is around 6 miles (9.7 km) to the north-east of the borders with both Worcestershire and Gloucestershire. Other than those already mentioned, significant towns and villages nearby include Alcester, Wellesbourne, Evesham, Redditch and Henley-in-Arden.

Stratford is divided by the River Avon, with the majority of the town being on the west side of the river, its riverside location means it is susceptible to flooding, including flash floods.

Stratford has several suburbs: The town's urban area encompasses the contiguous sub-villages of Alveston, Shottery and Tiddington, which were formerly independent, but now form part of the civil parish of Stratford, other distinct suburbs of the town include Bishopton, Bridge Town, Clopton and Old Town.

== Climate ==
Stratford has an oceanic climate, as is usual for the British Isles, with pleasantly warm summers and chilly, damp, overcast winters. The nearest MetOffice weather station is located 4 miles (6.4km) away, in Wellesbourne.

Due to Stratford's lowland position in the River Avon and Severn valleys, the town is slightly warmer and somewhat drier than one would expect for this area of the UK; compared to other parts of the Midlands, it can be considered a microclimate.

Sunshine hours are low to moderate, with an average of 1,546 hours of sunshine annually. Rainfall is spread evenly throughout the year. There is an annual average of 630.5mm (24.8 inches) of precipitation.

Stratford's warmest month is July, with an average maximum temperature of 22.8°C. January is the coldest month, with an average high of 7.7°C.

Climate data for Wellesbourne, Warwickshire
| Month | Jan | Feb | Mar | Apr | May | Jun | Jul | Aug | Sep | Oct | Nov | Dec | Year |
|---|---|---|---|---|---|---|---|---|---|---|---|---|---|
| Mean daily maximum °C (°F) | 7.70 (45.86) | 8.38 (47.08) | 10.93 (51.67) | 14.10 (57.38) | 17.27 (63.09) | 20.34 (68.61) | 22.84 (73.11) | 22.39 (72.30) | 19.26 (66.67) | 14.88 (58.78) | 10.60 (51.08) | 7.96 (46.33) | 14.75 (58.55) |
| Mean daily minimum °C (°F) | 1.64 (34.95) | 1.52 (34.74) | 2.78 (37.00) | 4.33 (39.79) | 7.14 (44.85) | 9.98 (49.96) | 11.98 (53.56) | 12.01 (53.62) | 9.92 (49.86) | 7.35 (45.23) | 4.18 (39.52) | 1.88 (35.38) | 6.25 (43.25) |
| Average precipitation mm (inches) | 52.23 (2.06) | 39.90 (1.57) | 39.82 (1.57) | 45.56 (1.79) | 54.74 (2.16) | 52.5 (2.07) | 56.87 (2.24) | 59.92 (2.36) | 50.89 (2.00) | 63.29 (2.49) | 59.08 (2.33) | 55.74 (2.19) | 630.54 (24.82) |
| Mean monthly sunshine hours | 56.95 | 79.14 | 116.42 | 157.82 | 195.98 | 190.10 | 199.84 | 180.82 | 142.94 | 106.65 | 66.01 | 54.10 | 1,546.77 |
Source: https://www.metoffice.gov.uk/research/climate/maps-and-data/location-specific-long-term-averages/gcqbgx8sp

== Demographics ==
In the 2021 census Stratford had a population of 30,495, an increase from 27,894 in the 2011 census and 22,338 in the 2001 census. The town's population has undergone expansion in recent years following government approval to build 800 new homes in Shottery, which included plans for a new relief road. Up to 500 new homes are planned in the Bishopton area of the town, and 270 homes on the Loxley Road.

In terms of ethnicity in 2021, 92.7% of Stratford residents were White, 3.3% were Asian, 0.6% were Black, 2.4% were Mixed, 0.2% were Arab and 0.8% were from another ethnic group.

In terms of religion, 58.4% of Stratford residents identified as Christian, 38.2% said they had no religion, 1.0% were Muslim, 0.8% were Hindu, 0.5% were Sikh, 0.5% were Buddhists, 0.2% were Jewish, and 0.5% were from another religion.

== Economy ==
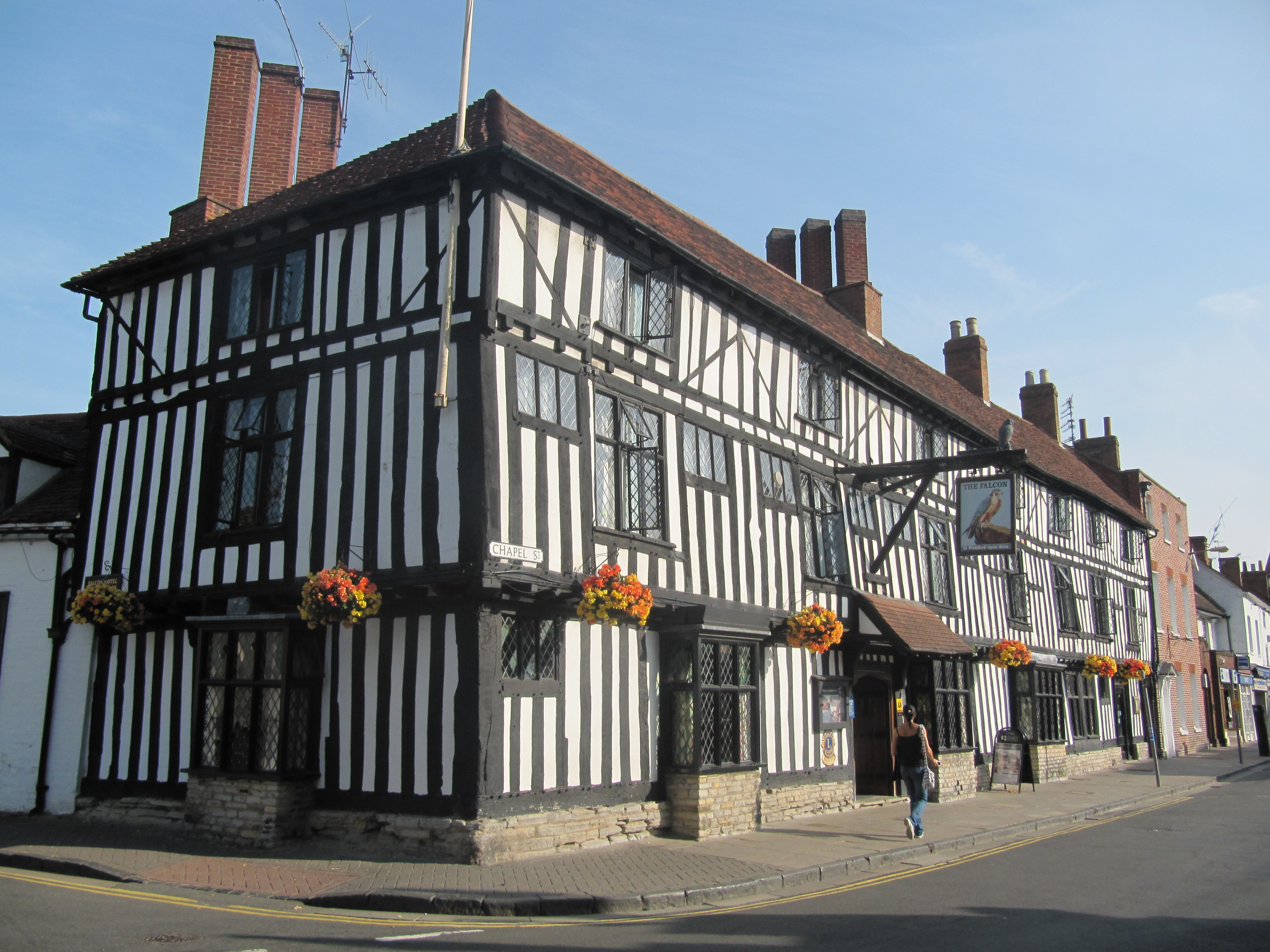
Hotel Indigo, historically The Falcon Hotel, is one of many employers in the hospitality industry within Stratford.

Tourism is a major employer, especially in the hotel, hospitality industry and catering sectors. Other industries in the town include boat building and maintenance, bicycles, mechanical and electrical engineering, food manufacture, Information Technology, call centre and service sector activities, a large motor sales sector, industrial plant hire, building suppliers, market gardening, farming, storage and transport logistics, finance and insurance, and a large retail sector.

Major employers in the town include the NFU Mutual Insurance Company (and Avon Insurance), Amec Foster Wheeler, Sitel, Tesco, Morrisons, Marks & Spencer, B&Q and Pashley Cycles. There are three theatres run by the prestigious Royal Shakespeare Company, which attract large audiences and income for the town.

=== Tourism ===
The regular large influx of tourists is the major source of the town's prosperity, receiving between 2.5 million and 3 million visitors annually. Stratford is a major English tourist town due to it being the birthplace of William Shakespeare, who many consider the greatest playwright of all time. In 2010, Stratford-on-Avon District Council spent £298,000 on tourism promotion, which included the launch of a re-branded official tourism website for the Stratford area called Discover Stratford and a new tourist information centre on Henley Street (though this has since returned to its original location on Bridgefoot). The council also supports an official open-top tour bus service in the town.

=== Shopping centres ===
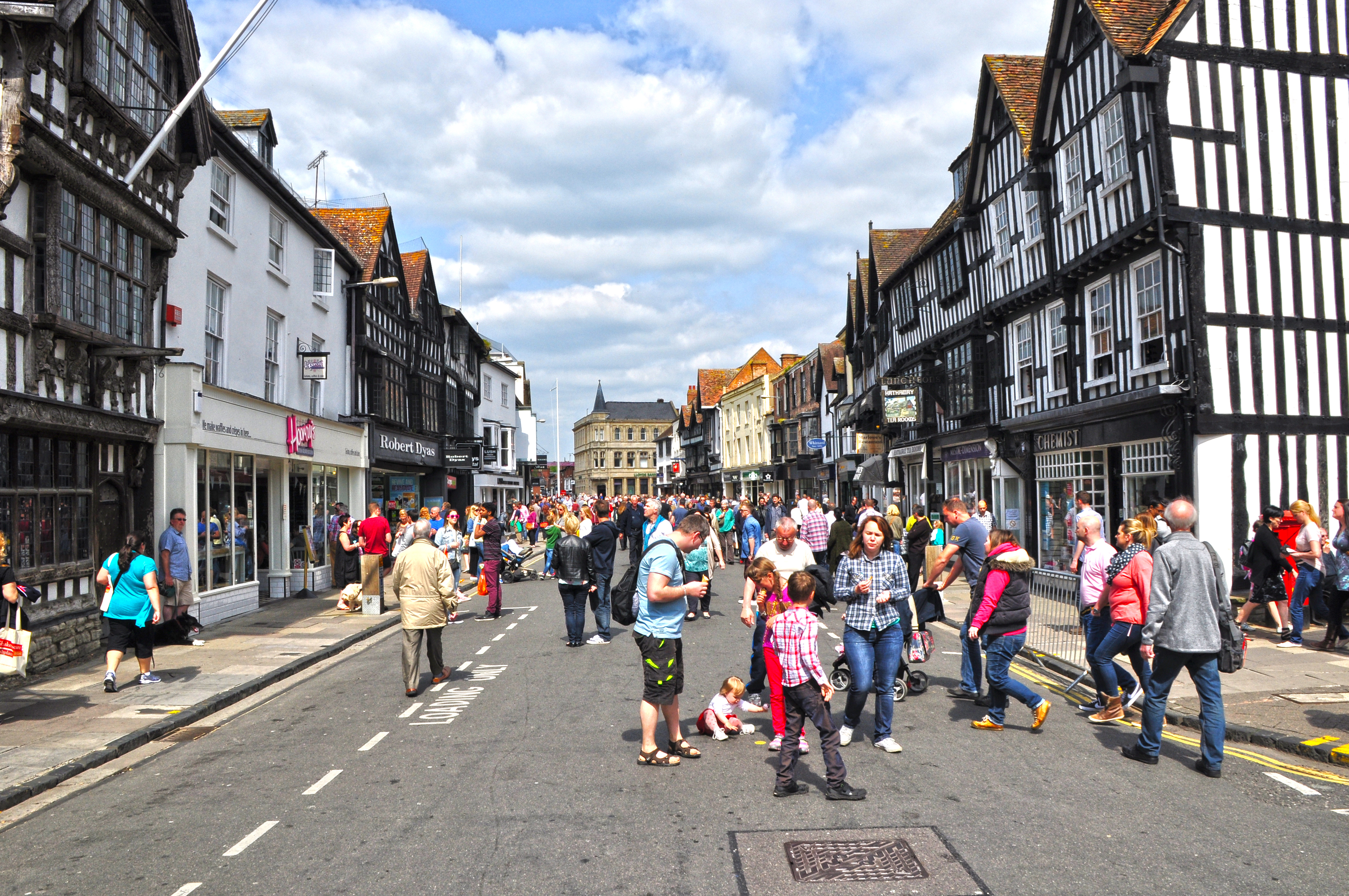
High Street, Stratford-Upon-Avon

Apart from the town centre, Maybird Shopping Park, usually referred to locally as "The Maybird Centre" or simply "The Maybird", is a large shopping centre situated on Birmingham Road, approximately a five-minute drive from the town centre. The Rosebird Centre is a much smaller shopping centre located on Shipston Road. Bell Court Shopping Centre is in the centre of the town with entrances from Wood St, Ely St, High St & Rother Street.

== Culture ==
=== Theatre ===
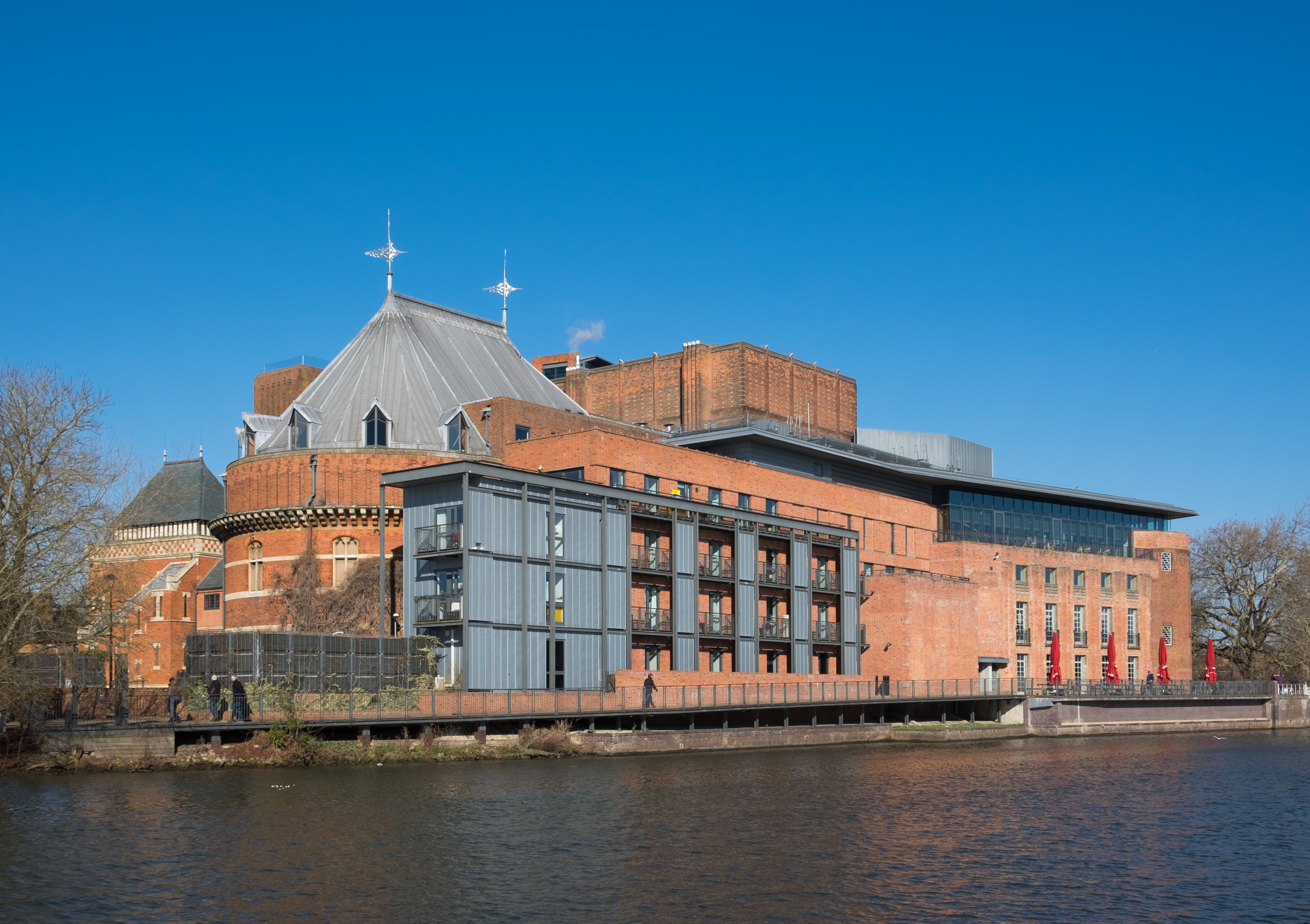
The Royal Shakespeare Theatre showing the embedded Swan Theatre

The first real theatre in Stratford was a temporary wooden affair built in 1769 by the actor David Garrick for his Shakespeare Jubilee celebrations of that year to mark William Shakespeare's birthday. The theatre, built not far from the site of the present Royal Shakespeare Theatre, was almost washed away in two days of torrential rain that resulted in terrible flooding. To celebrate the 300th anniversary of Shakespeare's birth in 1864, brewer Charles Edward Flower instigated the building of a temporary wooden theatre, known as the Tercentenary Theatre, which was built in a part of the brewer's large gardens on what is today the site of the new, and temporary, Courtyard Theatre. After three months the Tercentenary Theatre was dismantled, with the timber used for housebuilding purposes.

In the early 1870s, Flower gave several acres of riverside land to the local council on the understanding that a permanent theatre be built in honour of Shakespeare's memory, and by 1879 the first Shakespeare Memorial Theatre had been completed. It proved to be a huge success, and by the early 20th century it was effectively being run by the actor/manager Frank Benson. The theatre burned down in 1926, with the then artistic director, William Bridges-Adams, moving all productions to the local cinema.

An architectural competition was arranged to elicit designs for a new theatre, with the winner, English architect Elisabeth Scott, creating the Royal Shakespeare Theatre. The new theatre, adjoining what was left of the old theatre, was opened by the then Prince of Wales, later Edward VIII, in 1932. The new theatre had many illustrious artistic directors, including the actor Anthony Quayle. Sir Peter Hall was appointed artistic director (designate) in 1959, and formed the Royal Shakespeare Company (RSC) in 1961.

The Royal Shakespeare Company also runs two smaller theatres, the Swan Theatre, which was created in the 1980s out of the shell of the remains of the original Memorial Theatre and is modelled on an Elizabethan theatre, quickly becoming one of the finest acting spaces in the United Kingdom, and The Other Place theatre. Along with the Royal Shakespeare Theatre (RST), the Swan Theatre closed in 2007 for refurbishment and reopened in November 2010. The Other Place, a Black box theatre, was extended to become the temporary RSC Courtyard Theatre, opening in July 2006 and was the home of the RSC while the RST was being refurbished – its interior is similar to the interior of the refurbished RST. The Courtyard Theatre closed in 2015 and was replaced by The Other Place in March 2016, which returned as a 200-seat studio theatre within the steel extension in which the Courtyard Theatre was located.

Stratford is home to The Bear Pit Theatre which was founded in 2008 as a voluntary organisation. It has 100 seats and is part of the Little Theatre Guild. The Attic Theatre is Stratford-upon-Avon's premiere fringe theatre. Established by husband-and-wife team John-Robert and Catherine Partridge and in 2009, who also run the award-winning Tread The Boards Theatre Company. The venue is located next door to Cox's Yard and hosts an intimate 90-seat auditorium in the Grade II listed Attic space.

The Waterside Theatre, which is not part of the Royal Shakespeare Theatre complex, re-opened in December 2004, then closed in September 2008. During this span, the theatre housed the Shakespearience visitor attraction. This has now been turned into the Clore Learning Centre, the Royal Shakespeare Company's education and events venue. In 1988, Stratford-upon-Avon was the venue for the disastrous provincial try-out of the ill-fated musical Carrie, based on the Stephen King novel.

=== Filming and television ===
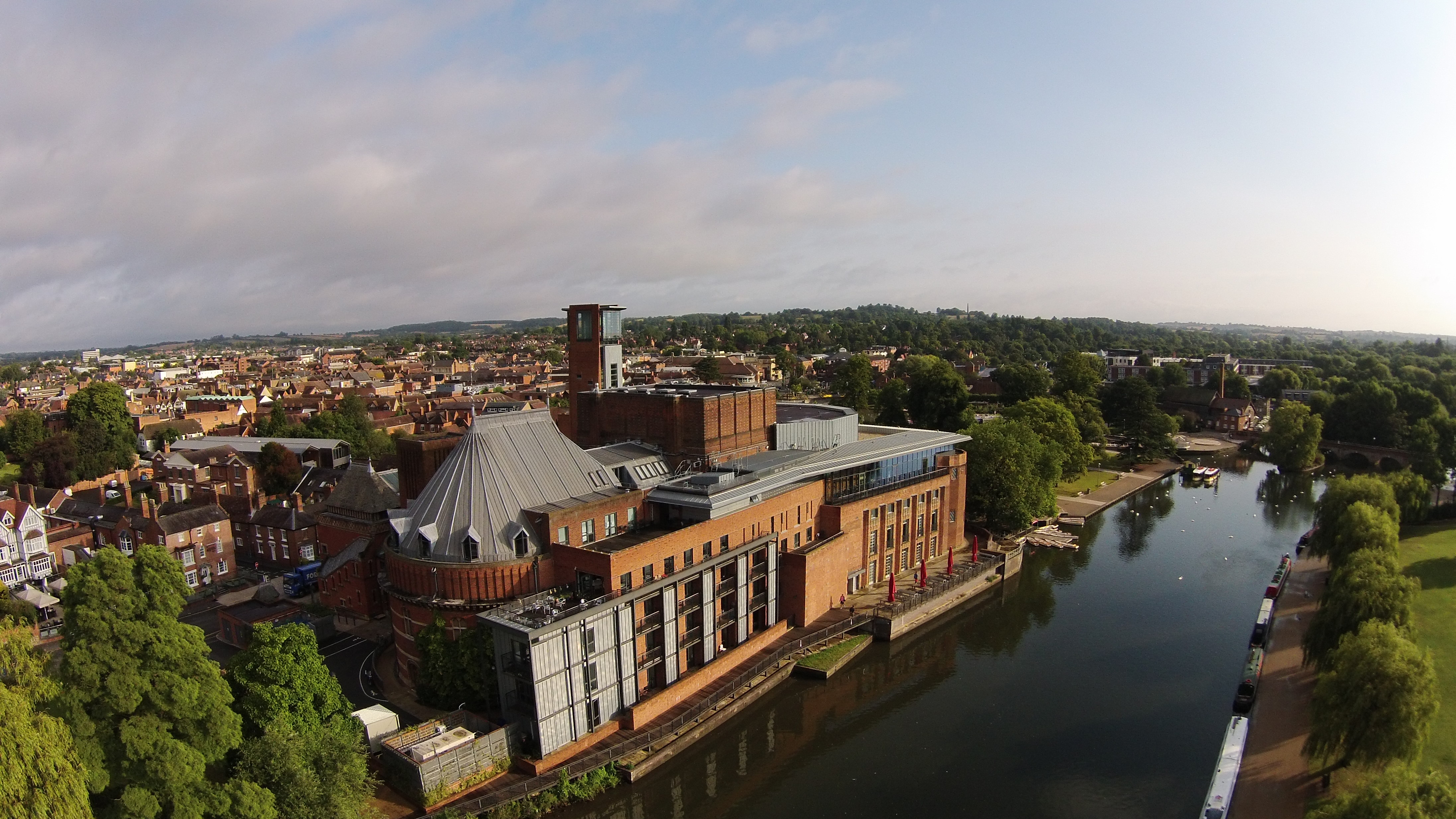
A view over Stratford with the River Avon and the Royal Shakespeare Theatre

The town is the setting of the 2018 BBC detective show Shakespeare & Hathaway: Private Investigators.

=== Music ===
Stratford ArtsHouse, previously the Civic Hall, is home to Orchestra of the Swan, a professional chamber orchestra staging up to 10 orchestral concerts with international soloists per year. Kempe Studio of The Rudolf Kempe Society, whose patron is Dame Judi Dench, is based in a house at 58 Waterside called The Muses and hosts musical events and masterclass lessons. No. 1 Shakespeare Street holds regular evenings of live music.

=== Museums and Shakespeare's houses ===
Tudor World is a museum which explores the time when Shakespeare lived. It is based in a Grade II* listed town centre Tudor building and is the only museum in the country dedicated to Tudor times. Every week there is a walk around the town with Shakespeare. The Mechanical Art and Design museum, but better known as MAD museum, is a museum in Henley Street of "brilliant-but-bonkers machines" made by Kinetic artists. Items on show include mechanised flipbooks and a musical typewriter.

There are five houses relating to William Shakespeare's life which are owned and cared for by the Shakespeare Birthplace Trust. These include Hall's Croft, the one-time home of Shakespeare's daughter, Susanna, and her husband Dr. John Hall and Nash's House, which stands alongside the site of New Place which was owned by Shakespeare himself, wherein he died. In Shottery is Anne Hathaway's Cottage, the home of Shakespeare's wife's family prior to her marriage. Mary Arden's House (Palmer's Farm), the family home of his mother, is in Wilmcote.

Elsewhere in the district are farms and buildings at Snitterfield, that belonged to the family of Shakespeare's father. King Edward VI School, located on the corner of Church Street and Chapel Lane, is a grammar school thought to have been attended by Shakespeare. In 2016, the school room where Shakespeare is believed to have studied opened to visitors.

=== Literature ===
Stratford has one library, located in Henley Street within a medieval building. Since 2008, Stratford has hosted the Stratford-upon-Avon Literary Festival, which holds two literary events a year, with one event in spring and a shorter festival in autumn. The festival has talks from celebrity guests, workshops and educational programmes and has become one of the most noted literary festivals in the country, with speakers including: Kirsty Wark, Alan Johnson MP, Baroness Shirley Williams, Tom Kerridge, Sir Tim Rice, John McCarthy, Michael Rosen, Howard Jacobson, Jeffrey Archer, Michael Palin, Jeremy Paxman, Alastair Campbell and Paul Merton.

=== Shakespeare's celebrations ===
Every year, Shakespeare's birthday is celebrated in Stratford. The celebration takes place over two days on the weekend closest to 26 April, the date of his christening, and includes musical performances, drama and a parade through the town. In 2016, events were held in Stratford to mark the 400th anniversary of Shakespeare's death.

=== Pubs ===
The Garrick Inn is reputedly the oldest pub in Stratford, with an inn existing on the site since medieval times. The Dirty Duck, located along Waterside, is a popular pub for actors performing at the nearby RSC theatres. For the last ten years, the Campaign for Real Ale (CAMRA) has held a cider and beer festival in the town.

=== Local media ===
Local news and television programmes is provided by BBC West Midlands and ITV Central. Television signals are received either from the Lark Stoke or Sutton Coldfield TV transmitters.

The town's local radio stations are BBC CWR on 103.7 FM, Capital Mid-Counties on 102 FM, Hits Radio Coventry & Warwickshire on 97.0 FM, and Welcombe Radio, a community based radio station.

The main local newspapers are the Stratford Herald or Stratford-upon-Avon Herald, a weekly newspaper which has been published since 1860 and is owned by Iliffe Media, and the Stratford Observer, a weekly free newspaper.

== Streets ==
=== Church Street ===
Church Street, an extension of Chapel St and the High St, has the old frontage of King Edward VI School, the school thought to have been attended by Shakespeare.

=== Henley Street ===
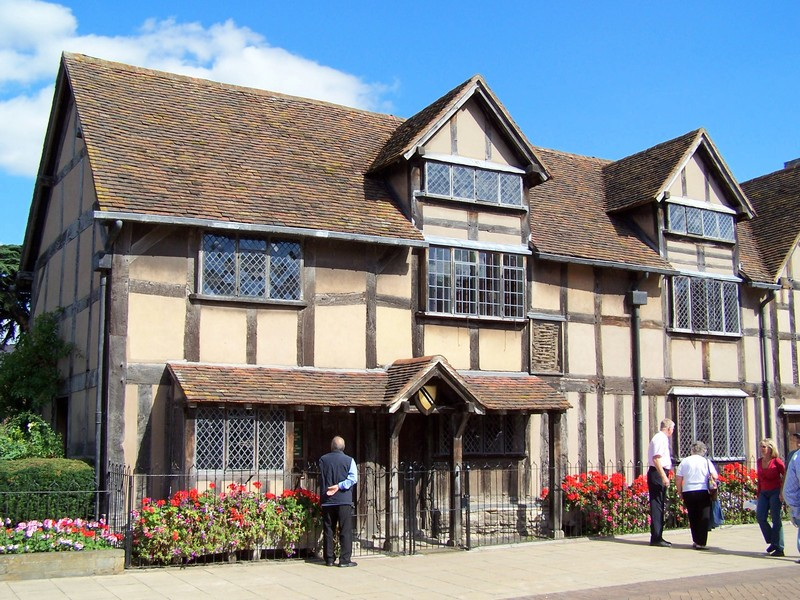
Shakespeare's Birthplace

Henley Street, one of the town's oldest streets, underwent substantial architectural change between the sixteenth and nineteenth centuries. John Shakespeare's large half-timbered dwelling, purchased by him in 1556, was in 1564 the birthplace of his son William. According to a descriptive placard provided for tourists there:

The property remained in the ownership of William Shakespeare's direct descendants until 1670, when his granddaughter, Elizabeth Barnard, died. As she had no children, Elizabeth left the estate to her relative Thomas Hart, Shakespeare's great-nephew. The main house became a tenanted inn called the Maidenhead (later the Swan and Maidenhead) following the death of John Shakespeare in 1601. Members of the Hart family continued living in the small adjoining cottage throughout the century.

At the end of the 19th century, Edward Gibbs renovated the building to more closely represent the original Tudor farmhouse. Adjacent to Shakespeare's Birthplace stands the Shakespeare Centre, completed in 1964 and not far from the Carnegie Library, opened in 1905. The large half-timbered building, which now comprises numbers 19, 20 and 21, was formerly the White Lion Inn. It is first mentioned in 1603. and was adjoined on the east by a smaller inn called the "Swan".

In 1745 the latter was purchased by John Payton, who acquired the "Lion" five years later and rebuilt the whole premises on a greatly enlarged scale. The work was completed by James Collins of Birmingham, builder, in 1753. Payton "brought the house into great vogue" though Byng in 1792 complained that "at the noted White Lion, I met with nothing but incivility" (cited from Torrington Diaries (ed. Andrews), iii, 152).

Payton was succeeded as innkeeper by his son John, and its reputation as one of the best inns on the Holyhead Road must have contributed not a little to the prosperity of the town. David Garrick stayed at the "White Lion Inn" during the Shakespeare Jubilee of 1769. and George IV, as Prince Regent, visited it when he came to Stratford in 1806. Its great days came to an end after John Payton the younger sold it to Thomas Arkell in 1823. The building is now home to the Enchanted Manor Museum at the Creaky Cauldron and Magic Alley; the Box Brownie Café; Doug Brown's Really Good Gift Company; and the Not Just Shakespeare Tourist Information Centre. Henley Street is now a major tourist and shopping precinct with many al fresco cafés and street entertainers.

=== Scholars Lane ===
Scholars Lane, opposite King Edward VI School, was included in the 1196 grid plan. Its original name, first recorded in about 1330, was Tinkers Lane, denoting the street where tinkers would gather on market days to mend pots and pans. It is now mainly residential.

=== Sheep Street ===
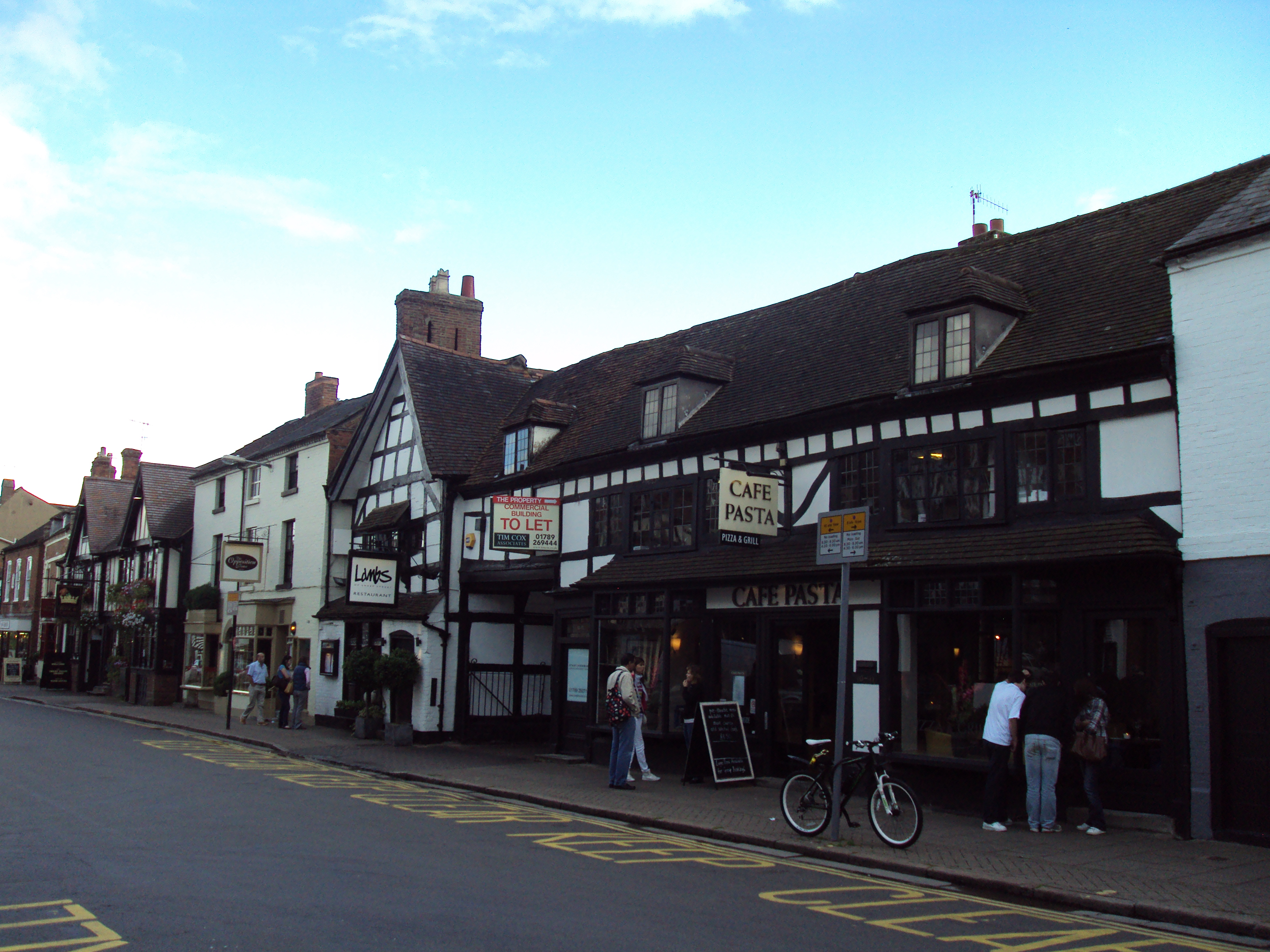
Some of the many cafés and restaurants along Sheep Street

Sheep Street runs from Ely Street eastwards to the Waterside. It was a residential quarter in the 16th century, some of the buildings were rebuilt following the fire of 1595, although many, such as Number 40, date from 1480. Formerly a two-story building that was extended in the early twentieth century has a lower story of substantial close-set studding: the upper is of more widely spaced thin vertical timbers. As the name suggests Sheep Street, which leads down from the Town Hall to Waterside and the Royal Shakespeare Theatre, was from early times and until the late 19th century, the area where sheep, brought from the neighbouring Cotswold Hills to be bought and sold. Today it is the restaurant centre of the town.

The Shrieves House is one of the oldest still lived in houses in the town and William Shakespeare is said to have based his character of Sir John Falstaff on one of the residents, his godson's uncle. Oliver Cromwell is thought to have stayed here in 1651. He wrote a letter from the town to Lord Wharton on 27 August 1651, before the Battle of Worcester. Behind The Shrieves House is a museum called "Tudor World" with recreations of 16th-century life in theatrical settings. Just off Sheep Street is Shrieves Walk, a very quaint walkway with several small independent stores. A Wetherspoons is also on Sheep Street.

=== Waterside and Southern Lane ===
This area of Stratford, which runs from the foot of Bridge Street to Holy Trinity Church and leads directly off Sheep Street and Chapel Lane, runs alongside the River Avon and offers access to the Waterside Theatre and all areas of the Royal Shakespeare Theatre. The Bancroft Gardens and river area is a very popular place for people watching, enjoying picnics and river activities. Bancroft Gardens also features the Gower Monument, a bronze statue of William Shakespeare flanked by four of his most popular characters. In the summer the River Avon is busy with rowing boats, motor boats and river cruises. The Stratford-upon-Avon Canal is busy with colourful narrowboats passing through or mooring up in the canal basin. There are often jugglers, fire-eaters and magicians entertaining the public on the lawns.

On the edge of the gardens is a water fountain, known as the Swan Fountain. It was unveiled in 1996 by Queen Elizabeth II to recognise that Stratford has been a market town since 1196. It is from here the Stratford Town Walk meet every day (even Christmas Day), to offer a guided walking tour of the town. The tour passes the Shakespeare houses, Royal Shakespeare Theatre's, 15th-century timber-framed buildings, William Shakespeare's school and visits Holy Trinity Church where Shakespeare was baptised and is buried. Waterside is also the location of The Dirty Duck pub which is frequented by actors from the nearby RSC theatres, theatre critics and theatregoers.

== Other attractions ==
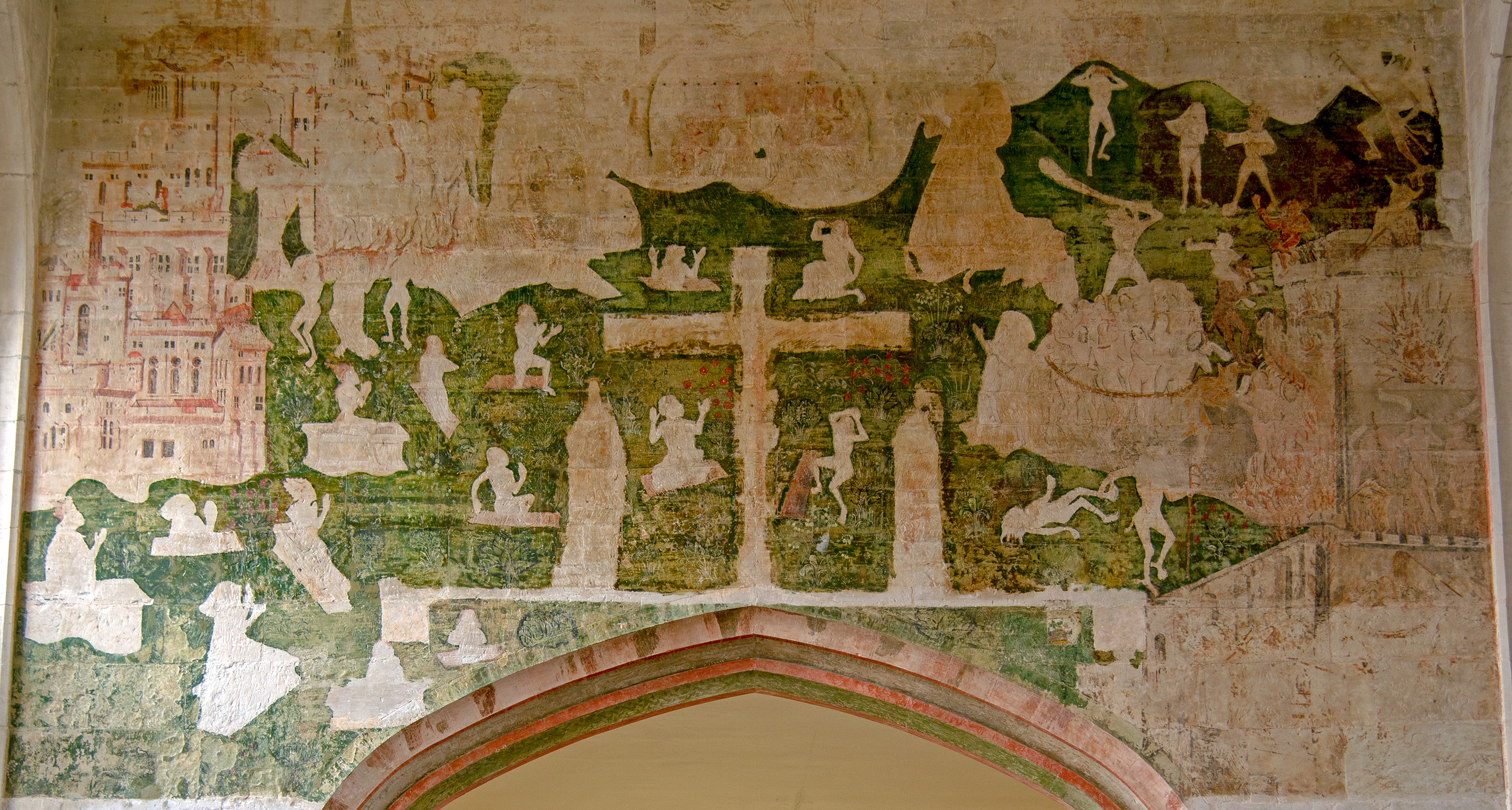
Some of the recently uncovered wall paintings in the Guild Chapel

Harvard House is located at 26 High Street. Other attractions include the Stratford Butterfly Farm, which is on the eastern side of the river Avon and the Bancroft Gardens and Stratford Armouries located three miles (4.8 km) from the centre of Stratford on Gospel Oak Lane. Each year on 12 October, unless this is a Sunday, in which case 11 October, Stratford hosts one of the largest mop fairs in the country. Ten days later, the smaller Runaway fair is held.

The Guild Chapel, at the intersection of Church Street and Chapel Lane, had a long association with William Shakespeare's family. The chapel offers a view of fine paintings from the early 1500s which had been covered up during the Reformation to save them from destruction. Centuries later, they were uncovered and are now visible.

== Transport ==
=== Road ===
Stratford is 22 miles (35 km) from the United Kingdom's second largest city, Birmingham, and is easily accessible from junction 15 of the M40 motorway. The A46 road links Stratford with the M40, Warwick and Coventry to the north-east, and Evesham and Ashchurch to the south-west, where it joins the M5 motorway. Until the M40 opened, the A34 passed through the town centre.

=== Buses ===
Bus services are provided predominantly by Stagecoach Midlands (formerly Midland Red South) and Diamond West Midlands. Smaller companies in the town include Flexibus and Hedgehog Community Bus. Routes connect the town with local destinations including Banbury, Coventry, Evesham, Leamington and Redditch.

=== Railway ===
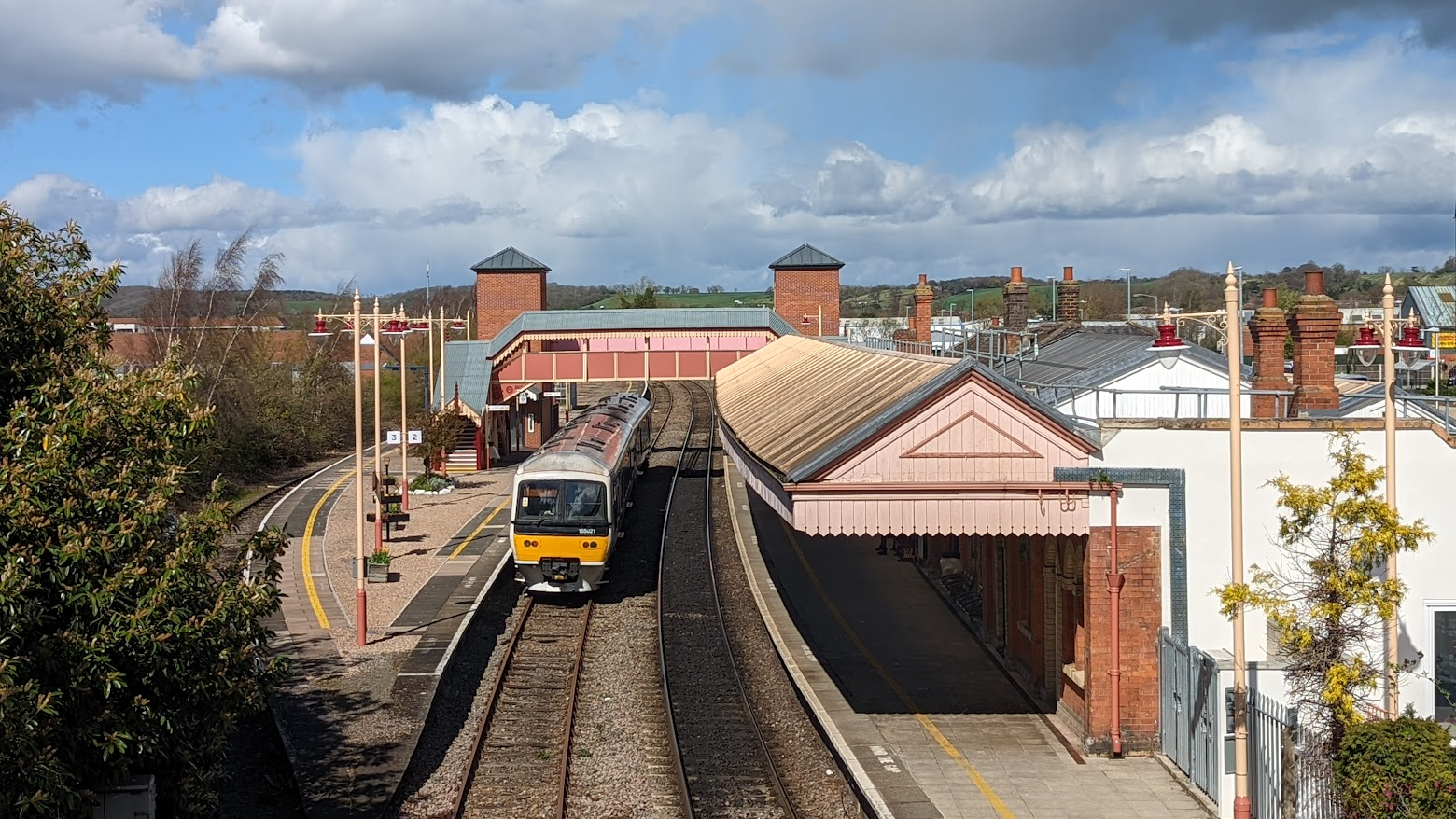
Stratford-upon-Avon railway station

Stratford now has two railway stations: Stratford-upon-Avon is the main town centre station and Stratford-upon-Avon Parkway lies on the town's north-western outskirts, with park and ride facilities.

Both stations are served by the following train operating companies:

- West Midlands Trains provides services to Solihull, Birmingham (Snow Hill and Moor Street), Kidderminster and Worcester Foregate Street.
- Chiltern Railways operates a route to Warwick and Leamington Spa; some direct trains travel daily to/from London Marylebone.

Stratford station is now the southern terminus of two branch lines from Birmingham and Hatton; up to 1976, the line formerly continued south of the town to join the Cotswold Line at Honeybourne, until this link was closed and dismantled. There has been a campaign in recent years to restore the Honeybourne link, which would entail rebuilding 6 miles (9.7 km) of track.

Stratford-upon-Avon's railway service has been criticised by the Royal Shakespeare Company and others for its limited direct services to London, which consists of a handful of daily direct trains, with connections available from Leamington Spa. In 2018, the RSC described the services to the station as "woefully inadequate" for an international tourist destination.

Until 1952, the town was also served by Stratford Old Town railway station of the former Stratford-upon-Avon and Midland Junction Railway.

=== Water ===
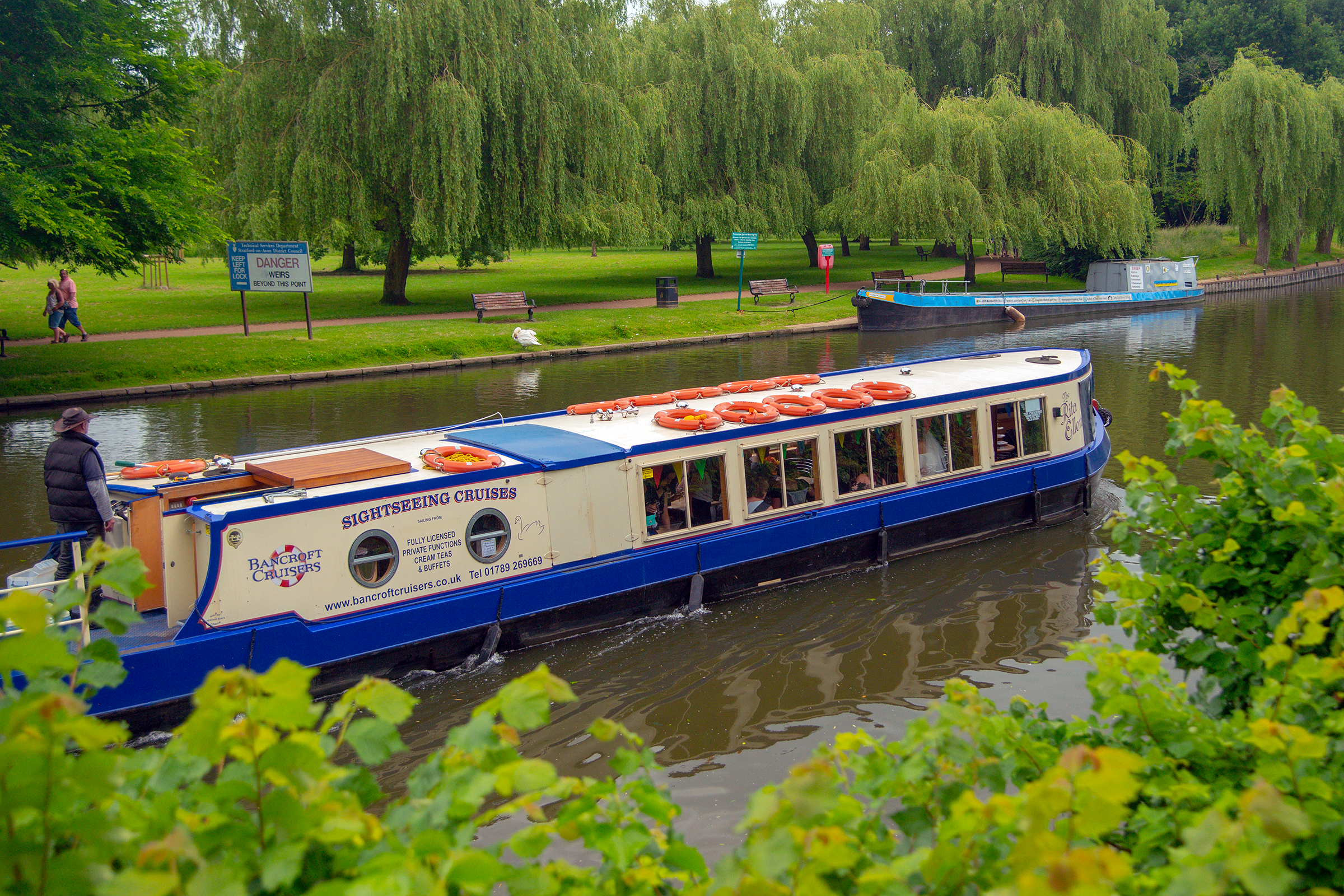
A boat tour of the Avon in a converted barge

Several companies offer sightseeing cruises along the river Avon and the canal, some using old river barges that have been converted for this use. The town is the terminus of the Stratford-upon-Avon Canal where it meets the river Avon.

The manually-powered Stratford-upon-Avon chain ferry was opened in 1937 and links Waterside, roughly halfway between the Royal Shakespeare Theatre and Holy Trinity Church, with the water meadows on the opposite side of the river. It was the last of its kind to be built in Britain.

=== Cycling ===
The town has numerous cycle paths, such as the Stratford greenway, a 5 miles (8.0 km) traffic free cycle path, which used to be part of the rail network until the early 1960s; it is now part of the Sustrans National Cycle Network (routes National Cycle Route 5 and National Cycle Route 41). Starting from town, it heads along the river Avon and racecourse towards Welford-on-Avon and Long Marston with a cycle hire and café available at the start of the Greenway at Seven Meadows Road.

=== Air ===
Birmingham Airport is 18 miles (29 km) to the north-west, with scheduled flights to many national and international destinations. Private pilots or charters may fly in to Wellesbourne Airfield 6 miles (9.7 km) to the West.

== Education ==
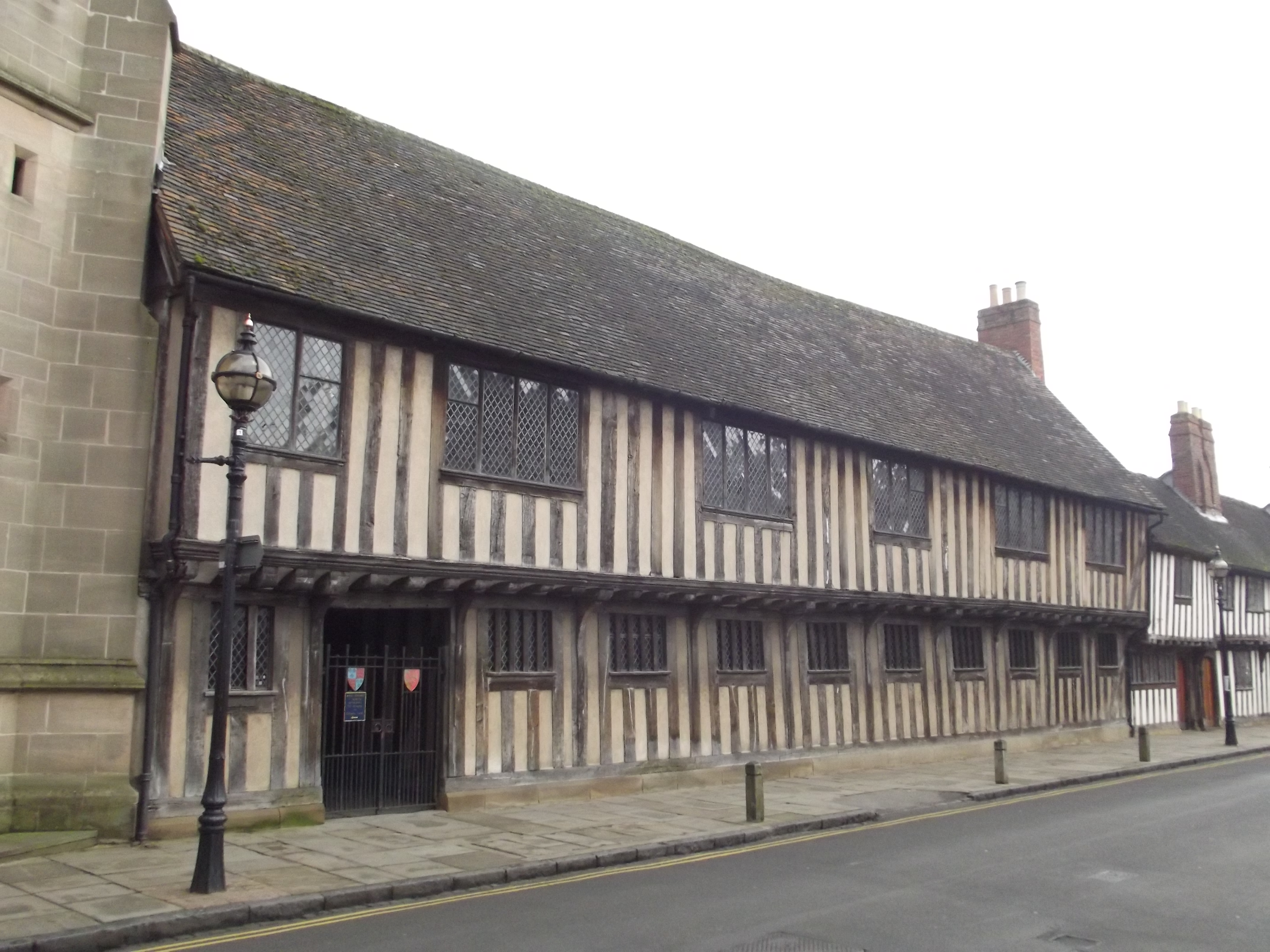
Part of King Edward VI Grammar School

Stratford is also home to several institutions set up for the study of Shakespeare, including the Shakespeare Birthplace Trust, which holds books and documents related to the playwright, and the Shakespeare Institute. William Shakespeare is believed to have studied at King Edward VI School. Previously an all-boys school, from September 2013 it admitted girls into the sixth form for the first time. It is one of the few remaining grammar schools in England, selecting its pupils exclusively using the 11-plus examination. There is also an all-girls grammar school, Stratford-upon-Avon Grammar School for Girls, colloquially known as 'Shottery School' after its location in the village of Shottery, a short distance from the town centre.

Finally, there is a non-selective secondary school, Stratford-upon-Avon School, formerly known as the Hugh Clopton Secondary Modern School, which was demolished to make way for the new high school. There are no independent secondary schools in the town, but there are many primary schools, including St. Gregory's Catholic Primary School, Stratford-upon-Avon Primary School (often known locally as "Broad Street" due to its location), Bishopton Primary School, Willows Church of England Primary School and Thomas Jolyffe Primary School both state and independent, as well as Stratford-upon-Avon College.

== Sport ==
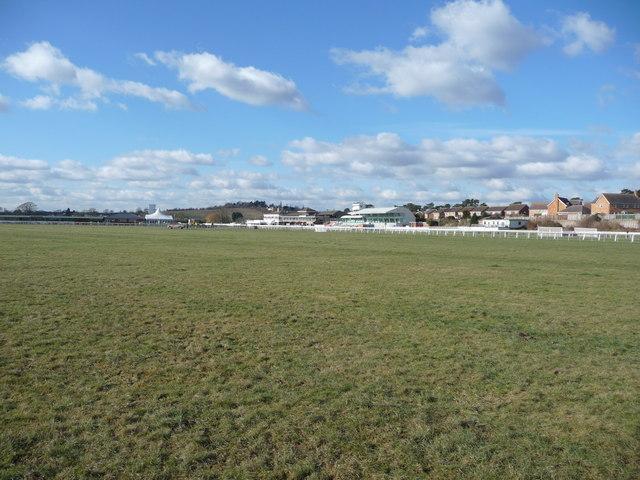
Stratford Racecourse

Stratford-upon-Avon Rugby Club is situated on Loxley Road at their home ground Pearcecroft. The club fields three senior sides and a colts under 18 team with the 1st XV currently playing in Midlands 1 (West). The club also has a large mini and junior section. Stratford-upon-Avon Cricket Club Ground is by the river Avon opposite the Royal Shakespeare Theatre. The first match recorded there was in 1880. It has hosted first-class games since 1951 and women's One Day Internationals since 2005.

The town's 5k parkrun event started in February 2016 and operates on the Recreation Ground every Saturday at 9 am. A junior parkrun started in June 2019 and takes place every Sunday at 9 am for children aged 4 to 14. Stratford Racecourse is located along the Luddington Road, about one mile from the centre of town which holds 18 meetings every year. It is a National Hunt course with an oval track of approximately a mile and a quarter and is considered to be one of the UK's leading small racecourses. Adventure Bike Rider (established in 2010) is United Kingdom bimonthly motorcycling newspaper.

== Churches ==
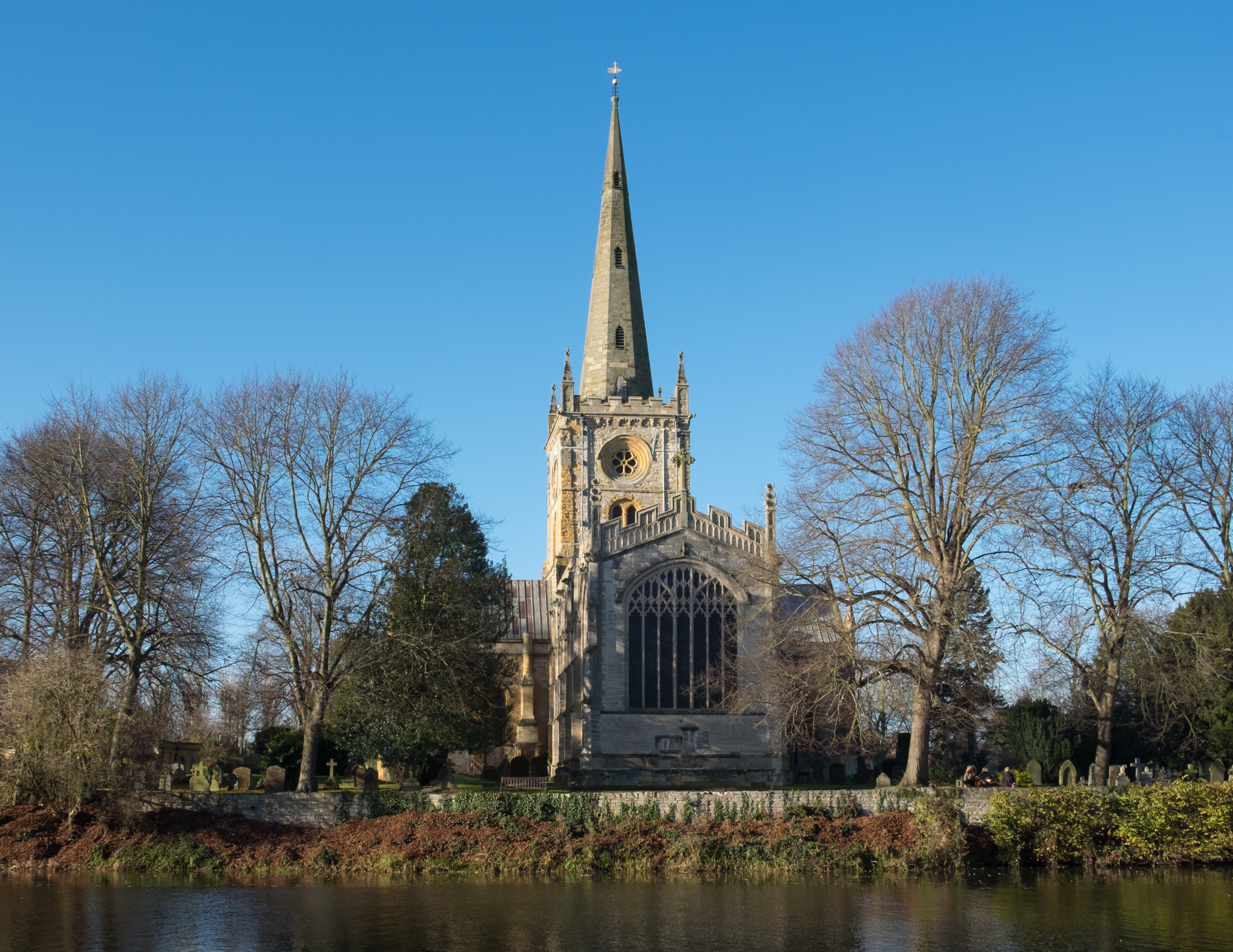
Holy Trinity Church

- Holy Trinity Church, Stratford-upon-Avon
- St Gregory's Catholic Church
- St Andrew's Church, Shottery
- Stratford-upon-Avon United Reformed Church
- Stratford-upon-Avon Methodist Church
- First Church of Christ, scientist, Stratford-upon-Avon
- Christadelphian church
- Guild Chapel

== Notable people ==
With the Royal Shakespeare Company in the town, many famous actors have at some point lived or stayed in Stratford or the surrounding villages. Some of these include:

- William Shakespeare (1564–1616), English playwright and poet
- David Bradley, actor known for his role in the Harry Potter films
- Craig Charles (1964–), actor, presenter and DJ known for playing Dave Lister in Red Dwarf and Lloyd Mullaney in Coronation Street has lived in Stratford
- Jeffery Dench, actor, lived just outside Stratford in Clifford Chambers until his death in 2014
- Sarah Douglas (1952–), actress, best known for her film and TV career, was born and raised in the town
- Marc Elliott actor born in Stratford, played Syed Masood on EastEnders
- Labour Party MP and actor Andrew Faulds lived in Old Town, Stratford, until his death in 2000, aged 77
- Actress and animator Sarah Ann Kennedy who grew up in Stratford. She is the voice of Miss Rabbit in Peppa Pig and Nanny Plum in Ben and Holly's Little Kingdom. She is also responsible for the creation of Crapston Villas, an animated soap on Channel 4
- Simon Pegg, actor, studied at Stratford-upon-Avon College (was born in Gloucestershire, England)
- Patrick Robinson (1963–), Casualty actor and Strictly Come Dancing contestant, lives in Stratford.
- Mark Strickson, actor famous for playing alien Vislor Turlough on Doctor Who.
- Daniel Brocklebank, actor who plays Billy Mayhew on Coronation Street.

Other notable residents include:

- Arthur C. Clarke, author of 2001: A Space Odyssey, served with the RAF at RAF Stratford during the 1940s. Clarke later wrote the short story "The Curse", which takes place in a post-apocalyptic Stratford-upon-Avon
- From 1901 to 1924, the romantic novelist Marie Corelli, real name Minnie Mackay, daughter of Charles Mackay, made her home, with her companion Miss Vyver, at Mason's Croft, Church Street, Stratford.
- Claire Darke, 161st Mayor of Wolverhampton
- Lord Digby Jones (1955–) lives near Stratford-upon-Avon and is Chairman of Governors at Stratford-upon-Avon College and Chairman of Grove Industries which is based in the town.
- David Domoney (1963–), gardener, co-host of Love Your Garden, lives in Stratford.
- English footballer Dion Dublin, who has played for Manchester United, Aston Villa, Celtic, and Coventry City, as well as the national team, lived with his wife and family in Stratford.
- Susan Fletcher, novelist – winner of Whitbread Prize (now Costa Book Award) and Betty Trask Award
- William Henry Flower (1831-1899), surgeon, Director of the Natural History Museum in London, and comparative anatomist, who became a leading authority on mammals and especially on the primate brain.
- Simon Gilbert and Neil Codling of the band Suede lived and were educated in Stratford.
- Members of indie bands Klaxons and Pull Tiger Tail all grew up and went to schools in Stratford before they moved to New Cross, London.
- Brad Moran, a former Australian rules footballer, grew up in Stratford before moving to Australia when he was 15
- Adrian Newey, famous Formula 1 designer, designed championship winning cars for Williams F1, McLaren and Red Bull F1 teams
- Andrew Pozzi (1992–), 110m hurdler born in Stratford-upon-Avon
- J. B. Priestley (1894–1984) died in Stratford
- Former Secretary of State for War John Profumo was the MP for Stratford-upon-Avon 1950–1963
- W. W. Quatremain (1857–1930), local landscape painter
- Gordon Ramsay, noted celebrity chef, and star of several cooking related shows, moved to Stratford-Upon-Avon with his family in 1976 when he was nine years old
- The historic Stratford family (who took their name from the town)
- George Macaulay Trevelyan (1876–1962), historian
- Quentin Willson (1957–2025), motoring expert, journalist and ex-Top Gear presenter, lived in Stratford.

== Twin towns ==
Stratford-Upon-Avon's mayor participates in an event known as Stratfords of the World, in which mayors of different cities named for Stratford in the Anglosphere, such as those below, meet.

| Town | Country |
|---|---|
| Stratford, Victoria | Australia |
| Stratford, Ontario | Canada |
| Stratford, Prince Edward Island | Canada |
| Stratford, Taranaki | New Zealand |
| Stratford, Connecticut | United States |

== Freedom of the Town ==
The following people have received the Freedom of the Town of Stratford-upon-Avon.

- Sir Kenneth Branagh: 22 April 2022.
- Dame Judi Dench: 22 April 2022.

== See also ==
- Stratford Hospital
- Avon Park, FL – a town in the United States named after Stratford-upon-Avon
