= The Dirty Duck, Stratford-upon-Avon =

The Dirty Duck The Black Swan
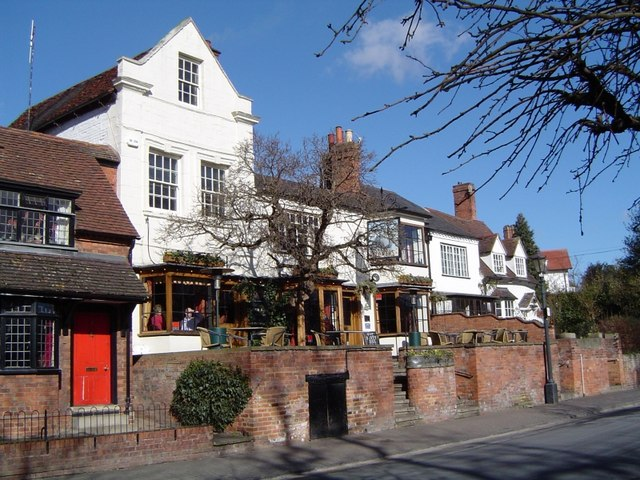

- Location within Warwickshire
- 52°11′26″N 1°42′17″W
- Type: Public House
- Location: Waterside Stratford-upon-Avon
- OS grid reference: SP 20225 54645

History
- Built: 15th century

Site notes
- Area: Warwickshire
- Owner: Greene King

Listed Building – Grade II
- Official name: The Dirty Duck Public House
- Designated: 25 October 1951
- Reference no.: 1207384

The Dirty Duck, also known as The Black Swan, is a pub located on Waterside in Stratford-upon-Avon, England.

== History ==
It has existed as a pub since 1738 and has been known as The Black Swan since 1776, although it may have been given this name earlier.

However, the pub is more commonly known as The Dirty Duck. It is unclear where this name originates. One reason could be that it was given this name by brewery families who played darts in the pub. Another reason could be that actors nicknamed it The Dirty Duck. It is the only pub in England which has a licence under its two names.

According to the pub menu, the contemporary name, The Dirty Duck, was given to the establishment by American GIs, who were stationed across the river Avon, opposite this establishment, at a military camp during WW2.

The pub was originally three buildings dating from the 15th century before becoming a single property. One of the buildings became a pub in 1738. A house next door was integrated into the pub in 1866 and in 1937 the pub was extended into a third property. The building has a Grade II listing, meaning it is of 'special interest'.

== Royal Shakespeare Company connections & notable clientele ==
The Dirty Duck is located close to three Royal Shakespeare Company theatres, namely, the Royal Shakespeare Theatre, the Swan Theatre, and The Other Place. The pub is frequented by actors performing at the theatres and theatre critics. It is also a popular pub for theatregoers. As a result, it has become intrinsically linked to the RSC, described by The Telegraph as "the unofficial licensed extension of the Royal Shakespeare Company".

Inside The Dirty Duck, there are many photos of well known actors who have performed at the RSC theatres and visited the pub including Judi Dench and Richard Burton and many of the photos have been signed. There is also a table signed by Judi Dench. Kylie Minogue once pulled a pint during a visit. Other notable visitors to The Dirty Duck include Laurence Olivier and Richard Attenborough.

Actor Len Parish, who was a member of Frank Benson's acting company, wrote a poem in the pub called Stratford Ale.

== See also ==
- List of pubs in the United Kingdom
