= Adventure Bike Rider =

- Type: Bimonthly Magazine
- Owner: Adventurize Ltd
- Publisher: Alun Davies
- Editor-in-chief: Bryn Davies
- Editor: James Oxley
- Managing editor: Bryn Davies
- General manager: Will Sandilands
- Staff writers: Abeer El-Sayed (Editorial Assistant) and Ollie Rooke (Staff Writer)
- Founded: 2010
- Language: British English
- Headquarters: Stratford-upon-Avon, England
- City: Stratford-upon-Avon
- Country: United Kingdom
- Circulation: 45,000 (as of 2024)
- Price: £6.99 (GBP)
- Readership: 112,500 (estimated)
- Sister newspapers: Wired for Adventure
- ISSN: 2044-7299
- OCLC number: 793212219
- Website: www.adventurebikerider.com

Adventure Bike Rider (ABR) is a British bimonthly motorcycling magazine published by Adventurize Ltd, based in Stratford-upon-Avon, England. Founded in 2010 by Alun Davies (publisher), the magazine focuses on adventure and touring motorcycling, including travel writing, motorcycle reviews, off-road techniques, and rider equipment.

== Overview ==
Adventure Bike Rider is distributed both in print and digital formats, featuring long-form travel articles, interviews, and reviews of motorcycles and gear within the adventure-touring sector. Each issue includes destination guides, product tests, and reader contributions aimed at promoting motorcycle travel culture.

The publication has expanded into a digital platform that includes:

- The Adventure Bike Rider website featuring news, reviews, and travel features;
- An active online community forum for touring and adventure riders.

== History ==
Adventure Bike Rider was founded in 2010 by publisher Alun Davies, a journalist and outdoor publisher, who previously founded titles including Trail as well as Adventure Travel magazine, which was later rebranded as Wired for Adventure.

Adventure Bike Rider’s editorial team is led by Managing Editor Bryn Davies and editor James Oxley, with Delance Lamont serving as design and managing editor.

Since its launch, ABR has positioned itself as a lifestyle publication at the intersection of motorcycle culture and travel journalism, with a focus on accessibility for new adventure riders and long-distance travellers alike rather than racing or sports performance.

Launched initially as a print magazine, it later expanded into digital editions, a website, and mobile platforms. Over the years, the brand has developed a large community of readers and riders through its events, forums, and online features.

The publication’s content has broadened alongside the growth of the adventure motorcycle sector, covering both domestic and international travel, product testing, and the culture of exploration on two wheels.

In recent years, Adventure Bike Rider has evolved into a multi-platform brand that includes print, digital media, and live events. The magazine continues to publish regularly while maintaining an active online presence and organising the annual Adventure Bike Rider Festival. It remains a leading publication in the UK adventure-motorcycling scene, reflecting the ongoing popularity of dual-sport and touring bikes.

== ABR Festival ==
The brand hosts the annual Adventure Bike Rider Festival (commonly known as the ABR Festival), an annual motorcycle event organised by the team behind Adventure Bike Rider magazine. It takes place each summer at Ragley Hall in Warwickshire, England.

First organised in 2019, the event has grown into one of Europe’s largest gatherings of adventure and touring riders, featuring manufacturer demo rides, live music, workshops, and trail courses.

The ABR Festival attracts major motorcycle brands including Royal Enfield, BMW Motorrad, KTM, Honda, and Triumph, alongside gear manufacturers and travel exhibitors. Attendance has steadily increased since its inception, with visitors from across the United Kingdom and Europe.

The Adventure Trail, a purpose-built riding route within the Ragley Hall estate, is one of the festival’s main attractions. It incorporates a combination of tarmac and off-road sections, designed to accommodate riders of varying experience levels. The event also includes guided trail sessions and skills demonstrations led by professional instructors.

Throughout the weekend, attendees can participate in technical workshops and presentations on topics such as motorcycle maintenance, travel planning, navigation, and safety for long-distance riding.

In addition to the riding activities, the festival includes camping facilities, catering areas, and entertainment stages that host live music and guest speakers. The format is intended to combine practical riding experiences with social and educational elements related to adventure motorcycling.

Since its launch in 2019, attendance has increased each year, with visitors from across the United Kingdom and Europe. The festival has become a regular fixture on the UK motorcycling events calendar, serving as a meeting point for manufacturers, equipment suppliers, and riders within the adventure-bike community.

== Circulation ==
As of 2025, Adventure Bike Rider reports a print circulation of approximately 45,000 copies per issue, alongside a growing digital readership through its website and mobile platforms.

== See also ==
- Motorcycle touring
- Motorcycle safety technology
