= Aegean Boat Report =

Norwegian NGO

Aegean Boat Report (ABR) is a Norwegian NGO that monitors and shares data about the movement of people in the Aegean Sea. As well as sharing data with aid organisations working directly with men, women and children seeking safety, Aegean Boat Report works to ensure the safety and security of those people, and shares regular updates with the public, to ensure the widest possible group of people are aware of what is happening to people attempting to reach safety from war, terrorism, violence and other oppression. ABR uses its data to lead on advocacy and legal challenges to promote and safeguard international law, and to protect the lives of men, women and children crossing to the EU.

== Advocacy and Pushbacks ==
Although pushbacks – the practice of forcing men, women and children back from Greek territory without giving them the opportunity to apply for asylum, or the equally-illegal practice of forcing people out of Greece into countries in which there is good reason to believe they will be persecuted, tortured, or killed – were being carried out by the Greek almost from the beginning of the Aegean refugee response, in March 2020, the practice accelerated

From 1 March 2020 to 30 April 2021, 12,741 men, women and children were pushed back from Greek waters or the Aegean islands by the Greek government. In the same period, just 4,974 people were registered by the government as 'new arrivals'

In most cases, those people were forced onto inflatable life rafts and set adrift at sea. Many were beaten, all were robbed of their possessions, some died, and all had their lives deliberately put at risk by the Greek government. The government, for its part, argues that all claims that pushbacks have taken place are 'fake news' developed by the Turkish government, and that all NGOs, national or international media and the UN, which have reported pushbacks, have either been fooled into doing so, or are engaged in a conspiracy against Greece. Simultaneously, the government has repeatedly told Greek media it is 'Greece's right' to prevent people landing in Greece, and to remove those who do, despite this being in direct breach of international law.

Aegean Boat Report has become an outspoken advocate on this illegal practice, including in national and international media, as well as in legal debates on issues related to people-movement. Its work is also central to an upcoming case to be heard at the European Court of Human Rights, after two children were allegedly told they would be taken to quarantine after arriving on Samos on 18 September 2020, and were instead forced into a life raft and set adrift by Greek uniformed officers.

== Greek government response ==
The Greek government's response to Aegean Boat Report's work to protect the rights and lives of men, women and children seeking safety after fleeing war, terror, chaos and oppression, has been negative.

In early December 2020, during the global Coronavirus pandemic's second wave and in the midst of a series of media exposés - many revealed by ABR - of illegal pushbacks carried out by the Greek police and coastguards, Greek Migration Minister Notis Mitarachis held an invite-only international press briefing.

The focus of this briefing was Mitarachis' claim that three international non-governmental organisations were engaged in 'smuggling' refugees from Turkey to Greece, and that Aegean Boat Report was 'at the heart' of this activity.

The 'evidence' Mitarachis presented to back this claim was thin: one video, shot in an unnamed place, at an unnamed time, in a white-walled room with no distinguishing features, with two young Somalians who said that they had contacted Aegean Boat Report when in distress at sea.

Not only was no information offered about the circumstances under which this video was shot (the young men/boys did not appear to have any legal representation during the shooting of the scene, and it is far from clear what led to them agreeing to be videoed, or whether they agreed the Greek government could release this video to international media), even what they said did not suggest any wrongdoing by ABR or the other two named NGOs.

It is not illegal to cross borders with or without paperwork if one applies for asylum as soon as possible after arriving, and it was not revealed whether the videoed boys had made such an application. More importantly, and specifically, the boys did not at any point claim that ABR had played any part in their crossing from Turkey to Greece, only that when they feared they were in trouble, they called ABR to attempt to find a safe place to land (at this point, ABR still informed the Greek Coastguard if it received news of any new arrivals, so the coastguard could bring them to safety and help them enter the legal asylum system).

Despite this lack of evidence, many news organisations chose to carry the story, naming ABR and in many cases the other two organisations Mitarachis had smeared.

Some Greek news media named Tommy Olsen as an individual, and published his photograph.

The organisation responded by setting the record straight, in a statement available in full on its website in which it explained that, far from acting illegally, it in fact assisted the legal system to work correctly by helping ensure that people in need of asylum entered the legal application process.

Its statement included the points:

'We are astonished to have been the focus of an unprovoked and deliberately misleading attack on our organisation.

'Aegean Boat Report, in common with all aid organisations working to help the Greek government and the EU with the refugee response in Greece, strongly opposes people smuggling between Turkey and Greece.

'We are not, never have been and never will be part of any smuggling network and we do not work, have never worked, and will never work with any person or people smuggling people on any route, in any part of the world.'

ABR also contacted the news organisations which had carried the story. Almost all, when having been advised of the reality of the situation, made corrections while many others ran new stories. The Times of London apologised to ABR, altered its story to reflect the reality, and withdrew the story entirely after two days. Only two sites – both of which are known for their backing of Greece's Nea Dimokratia government, to which Mitarachis belongs - refused to publish corrections. Even they altered their stories. ABR added:

'We must request the Minister ceases his baseless allegations, and advise him that if he wishes to allege we have acted illegally or improperly he must produce something more than a small number of refugees saying that smugglers in Turkey know the name 'Aegean Boat Report' and tell them if they attempt to contact us they will be given dry clothing and a bottle of water. 'We have broken no law, we do not work with anyone who does, and it is inexplicable that a Minister of the Greek government would seek to launch such a wild attack on a small organisation trying to ensure that people forced by Greek and EU policy to take dangerous journeys presided over by criminals do not die and are not lost to the system.'

== Withdrawal of information from Hellenic Coastguard ==
In March 2021, Aegean Boat Report said it must suspend its previous practice of informing the Greek coastguard of the whereabouts of boats carrying refugees, which it had done up until then to help ensure their safety, because the Greek government had now changed the nature of the coastguard from a life-saving service, to a force designed to deny people's human rights, and endanger their lives.

On 16 March 2021, in a message posted on Twitter, it said:

'We regret that as of this week, we will no longer share with Greek port police the locations of people seeking asylum in Greece, because of the Greek government's illegal, immoral and unacceptable pushbacks of refugees from its borders.'

A more detailed statement on its website added:

'Since March 2020, the Greek government's field operatives have pushed 10,656 men, women and children back from Greek waters – and in many cases Greek land and even refugee camps in Greece – into Turkish waters: a clear, direct, immoral and unacceptable breach of international law and of all of our rights as human beings.

'We do not feel it is possible for us to continue to assist the Greek port police and the Greek government by providing them with this information, for as long as they continue to behave in this unacceptable, unjustifiable, and illegal way.

'As soon as the Greek government ceases to break the law, we will of course be very happy to return to helping them as we do the men, women and children seeking safety and fleeing violence and oppression elsewhere in the world.'
