= Portraits of Shakespeare =

Visual representations of William Shakespeare

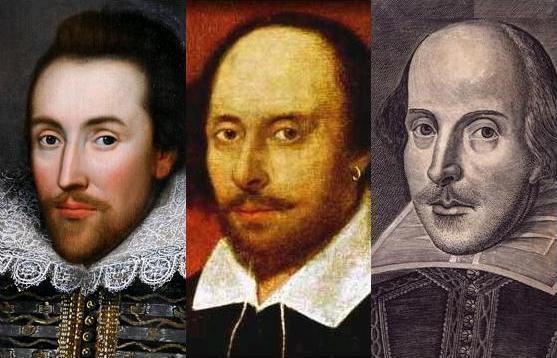
From farthest left to right: The Cobbe portrait (1610), The Chandos portrait (early 1600s) and the Droeshout portrait (1622): three of the most prominent of the reputed portraits of William Shakespeare.

No contemporary physical description of the English playwright William Shakespeare is known to exist. The two portraits of him that are the most famous (both of which may be posthumous) are the engraving that appears on the title-page of the First Folio, published in 1623, and the sculpture that adorns his memorial in Stratford upon Avon, which dates from before 1623. Experts and critics have argued that several other paintings from the period may represent him, and more than 60 portraits purporting to be of Shakespeare were offered for sale to the National Portrait Gallery within four decades of its foundation in 1856, but in none of them has Shakespeare's identity been proven.

There is no concrete evidence that Shakespeare ever commissioned a portrait. However, it is thought that portraits of him did circulate during his lifetime because of a reference to one in the anonymous play Return from Parnassus (c. 1601), in which a character says "O sweet Mr Shakespeare! I'll have his picture in my study at the court."

After his death, as Shakespeare's reputation grew, artists created portraits and narrative paintings depicting him, most of which were based on earlier images, but some of which were purely imaginative. He was also increasingly commemorated in Shakespeare memorial sculptures, initially in Britain, and later elsewhere around the world. At the same time, the clamour for authentic portraits fed a market for fakes and misidentifications.

== Portraits clearly identified as Shakespeare ==
There are two representations of Shakespeare that are unambiguously identified as him, although both may be posthumous.

- The Droeshout portrait. An engraving by Martin Droeshout as title-page to the First Folio, printed in 1622 and published in 1623. An introductory poem in the First Folio, by Ben Jonson, suggests that it is a very good likeness.
- The bust in Shakespeare's funerary monument, in the choir of Holy Trinity Church, Stratford-upon-Avon. This half-length statue on his memorial must have been erected by 1623, when it is referred to in an introduction to the First Folio.

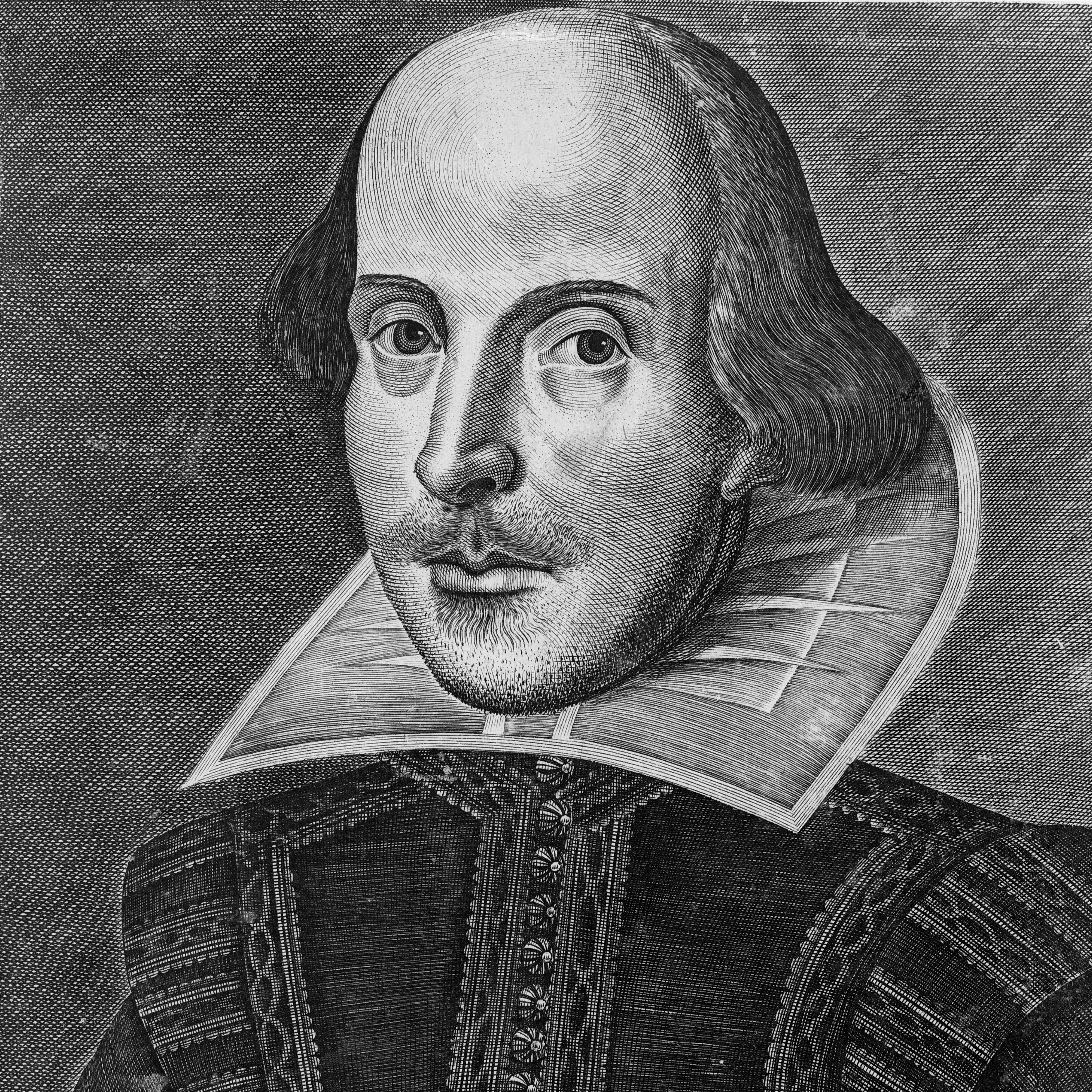
The Droeshout Portrait of William Shakespeare, from the First Folio

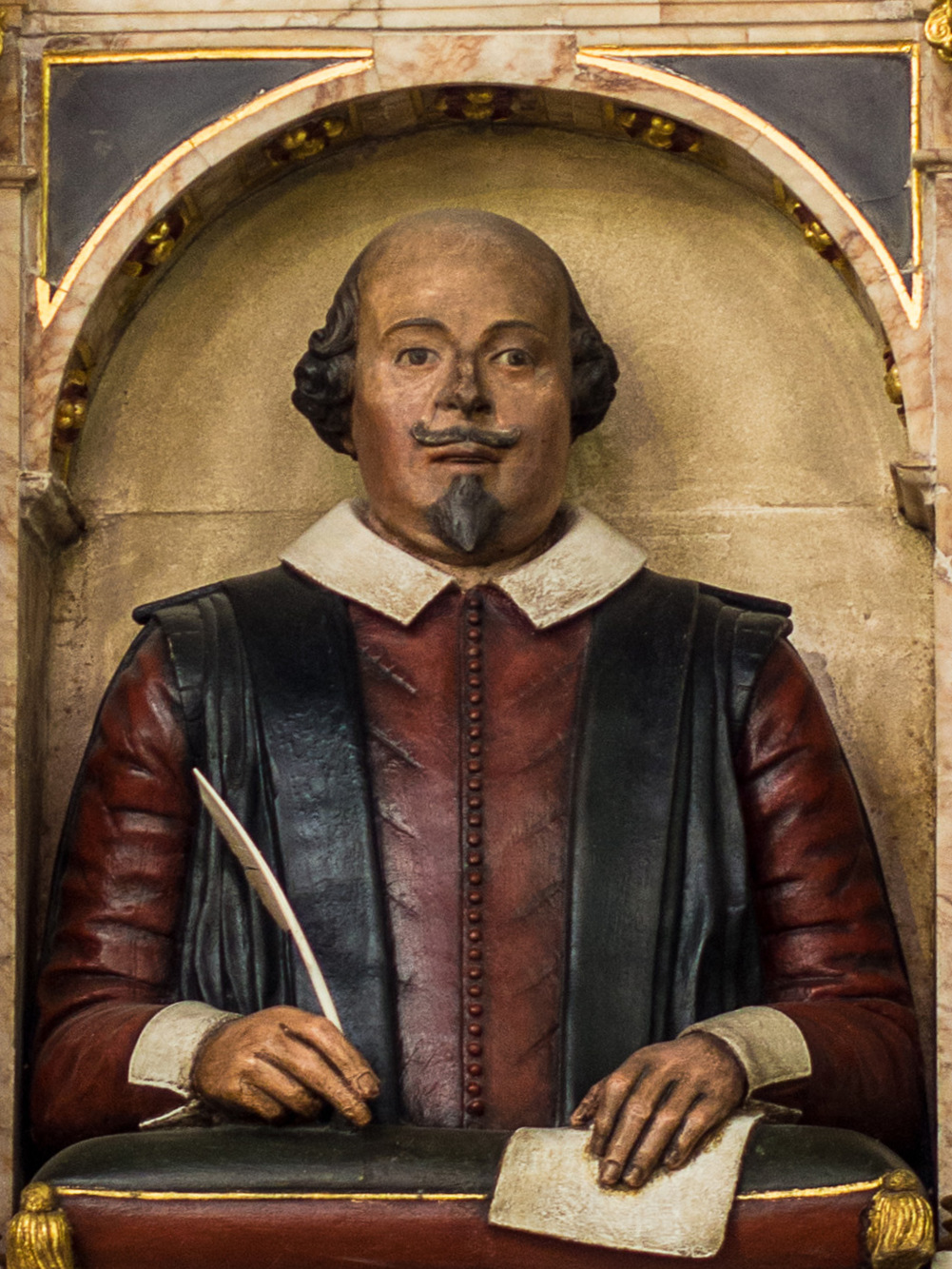
Bust of Shakespeare at Shakespeare's funerary monument

== Possible portraits ==
There are several portraits dated to the 17th century that have been claimed to represent Shakespeare, although in each the sitter is either unidentified or the identification with Shakespeare is debatable.

=== Probably made during Shakespeare's lifetime ===
- The Chandos portrait. This portrait is attributed to John Taylor, and dated to about 1610. In 2006, the National Portrait Gallery, London published a report authored by Tarnya Cooper saying it is the only painting with any real claim to have been done from life. The Cobbe portrait had not been discovered at that time, but Cooper has since confirmed her opinion. The name arose as it was once in the possession of the Duke of Chandos.
- The Chess Players attributed to Karel van Mander. This was identified in 1916 as an image of Ben Jonson and Shakespeare playing chess. Most scholars consider this to be pure speculation, but the claim was revived in 2004 by Jeffrey Netto, who argued that the chess game symbolises "the well known professional rivalry between these figures in terms of a battle of wits".
- The Cobbe portrait: In 2009, Stanley Wells and the Shakespeare Birthplace Trust announced that they believe this painting, which has been in the possession of the Cobbe family since the early 18th century, is a portrait of Shakespeare drawn from life. The portrait is thought to have belonged initially to Shakespeare's patron, Henry Wriothesley, 3rd Earl of Southampton, and to have been copied by another artist who created the painting known as the Janssen portrait, which had already been claimed to depict Shakespeare. Tarnya Cooper, the 17th-century art specialist at the National Portrait Gallery, argues that both paintings depict Thomas Overbury.
- The Grafton portrait by an unknown artist of a man whose age, like Shakespeare's, was 24 in 1588. It belongs to the John Rylands University Library Manchester. Following analysis of the portrait by the National Portrait Gallery, curator Tarnya Cooper concluded that there was no evidence to suggest it might depict Shakespeare, and that the clothing was incompatible with Shakespeare's financial situation at the time. It has been suggested that the subject is the same as the putative Marlowe portrait.
- Reputed portrait in John Gerard's Herball. In May 2015, the magazine Country Life published a cover story with the claim by the botanist Mark Griffiths that a portrait of Shakespeare was included as part of the title page of Herball, or Generall Historie of Plantes, a 1597 book by John Gerard. Others have argued that such an identification is tenuous as best.
- A Man Clasping a Hand from a Cloud, by Nicholas Hilliard dated 1588. This was identified as Shakespeare by Leslie Hotson in his book Shakespeare by Hilliard (1977). Sceptical scholars believe this is unlikely. Roy Strong suggested that it is Lord Thomas Howard, first Earl of Suffolk. (National Portrait Gallery, London)
- The Peake portrait. A portrait said to depict Shakespeare by Robert Peake the Elder, signed and dated 1608, was put on sale in October 2022. Peake produced portraits of many significant members of Jacobean society, and had been commissioned by the Office of the Revels which oversaw the production of plays as well as providing rehearsal space used by Shakespeare's company. However, the claim that it depicts Shakespeare was dismissed as "wishful thinking" by Shakespeare scholar Michael Dobson.
- The Sanders portrait. This has a label attached identifying it as Shakespeare and stating that it was painted in 1603. New scientific tests on the label and the oak panel suggest that it dates to Shakespeare's lifetime, which, if true, would make this a likely authentic image of Shakespeare. It is attributed by a family tradition to one John Sanders, or possibly his brother Thomas, who is believed to have been a scene painter for William Shakespeare's Theatre Company. The identification has been queried on the grounds that the subject appears to be too young for the 39-year-old Shakespeare in 1603 and that 23 April birth date on the label reflects the conventional date adopted in the 18th century, which is not certain to be accurate. The inscription on the label "This likeness taken" has been criticised as not a contemporary formulation.
- The Wadlow portrait Believed to be a portrait of William Shakespeare painted in 1595. It was bought in the late 1960s by Peter Wadlow from a firm of picture restorers and art dealers called Pryse Hughes. Peter Wadlow was told that it was painted in 1595. The painting has the number 31 at the top left. William Shakespeare was 31 in 1595. Evidence suggests that the painting came from Great Tew which was owned by the Keck family. As well as owning the Chandos portrait, Robert Keck is also believed to have owned a second portrait of Shakespeare which like the Wadlow portrait was painted in oil in 1595. The Wadlow portrait was taken to Lumiere technology of Paris who examined it using their Layer Amplification Method (LAM) camera. Initially they thought that the Wadlow might be a pastiche of other Shakespeare portraits but after examining it with their technology they produced a video merger which highlights the similarities between the Wadlow portrait and the Droeshout engraving. Jean Penicaut of Lumiere Technology hypothesized that the Wadlow portrait was originally a portrait of Shakespeare but may later have been used as a stage prop. This supposition was derived by comparing the portrait's face with the Droeshout engraving and underdrawing which indicates that it was painted from life. Under this line of thinking, the overpainting could imply that the company used it as a generic prop and would change the clothing to suit the specific play or character that was being portrayed
- The Zuccari portrait. A life-size oval portrait painted on a wooden panel. This was owned by Richard Cosway, who attributed it to Federico Zuccari, an artist who was contemporary with Shakespeare. It is no longer attributed to him, nor is there any evidence to identify it as Shakespeare; however it was probably painted during his lifetime and may depict a poet.

==== Gallery: portraits claimed to be of Shakespeare painted from life ====
The Chandos portrait

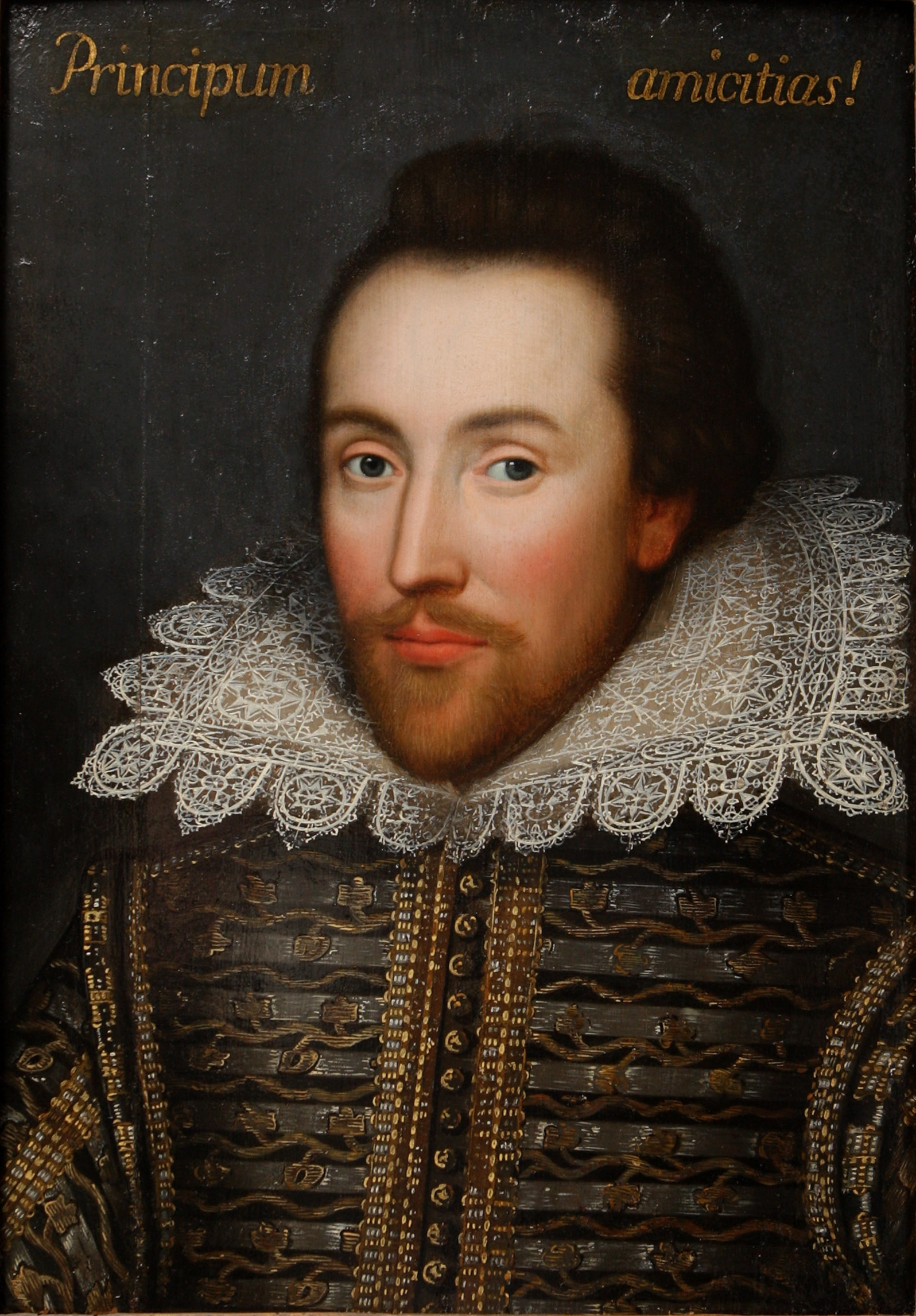
The Cobbe portrait

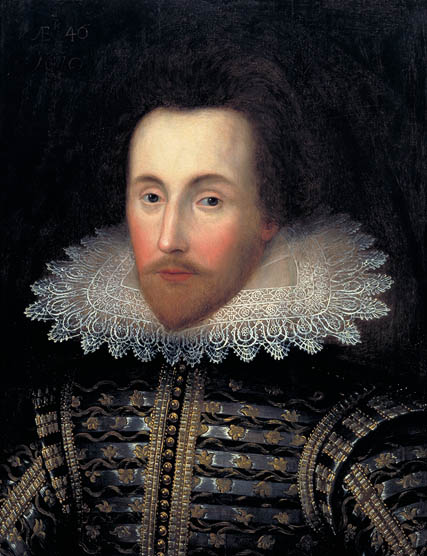
The Janssen portrait

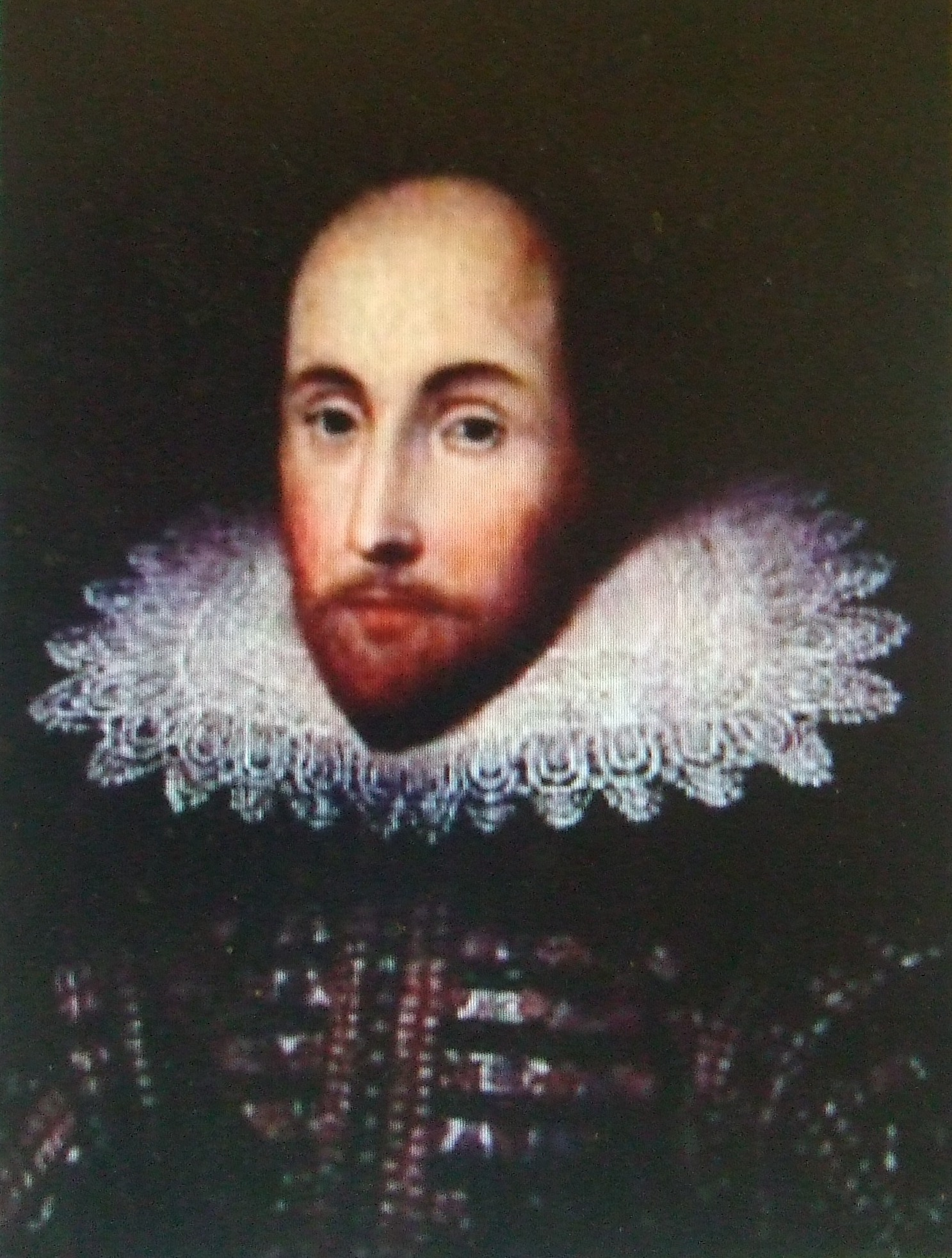
The Janssen portrait as it appeared before restoration in 1988

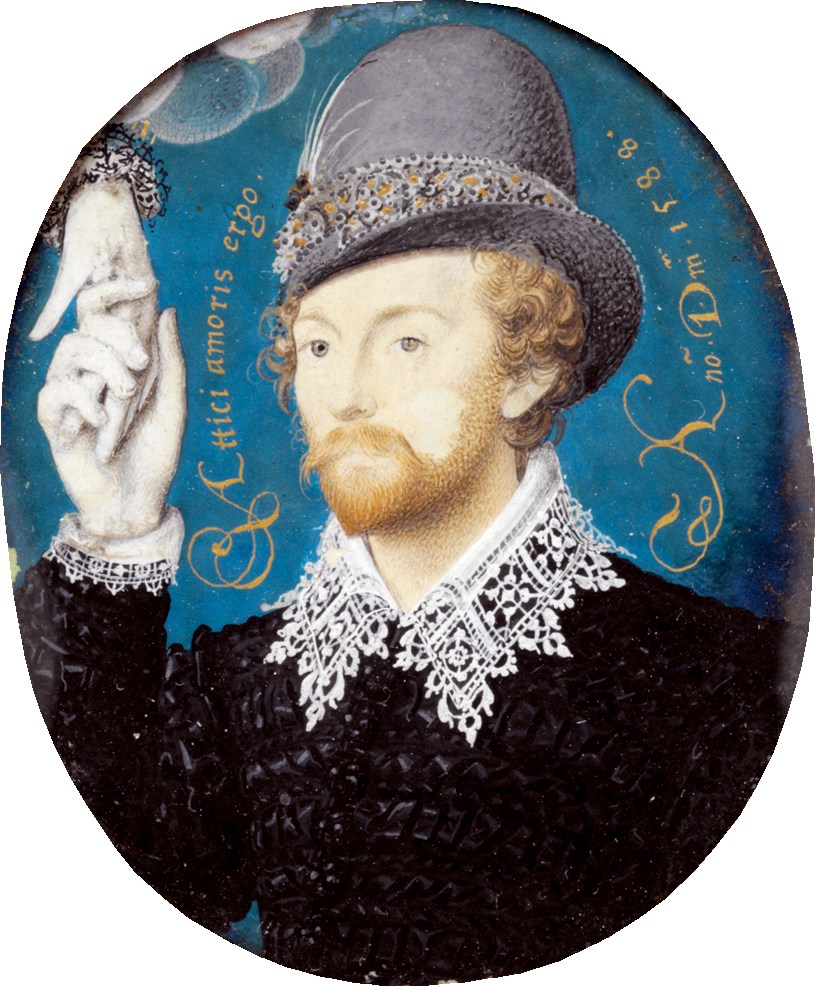
Nicholas Hilliard: Man Clasping Hand from a Cloud

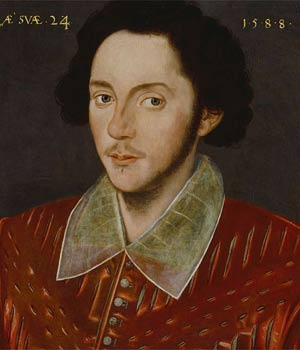
The Grafton portrait

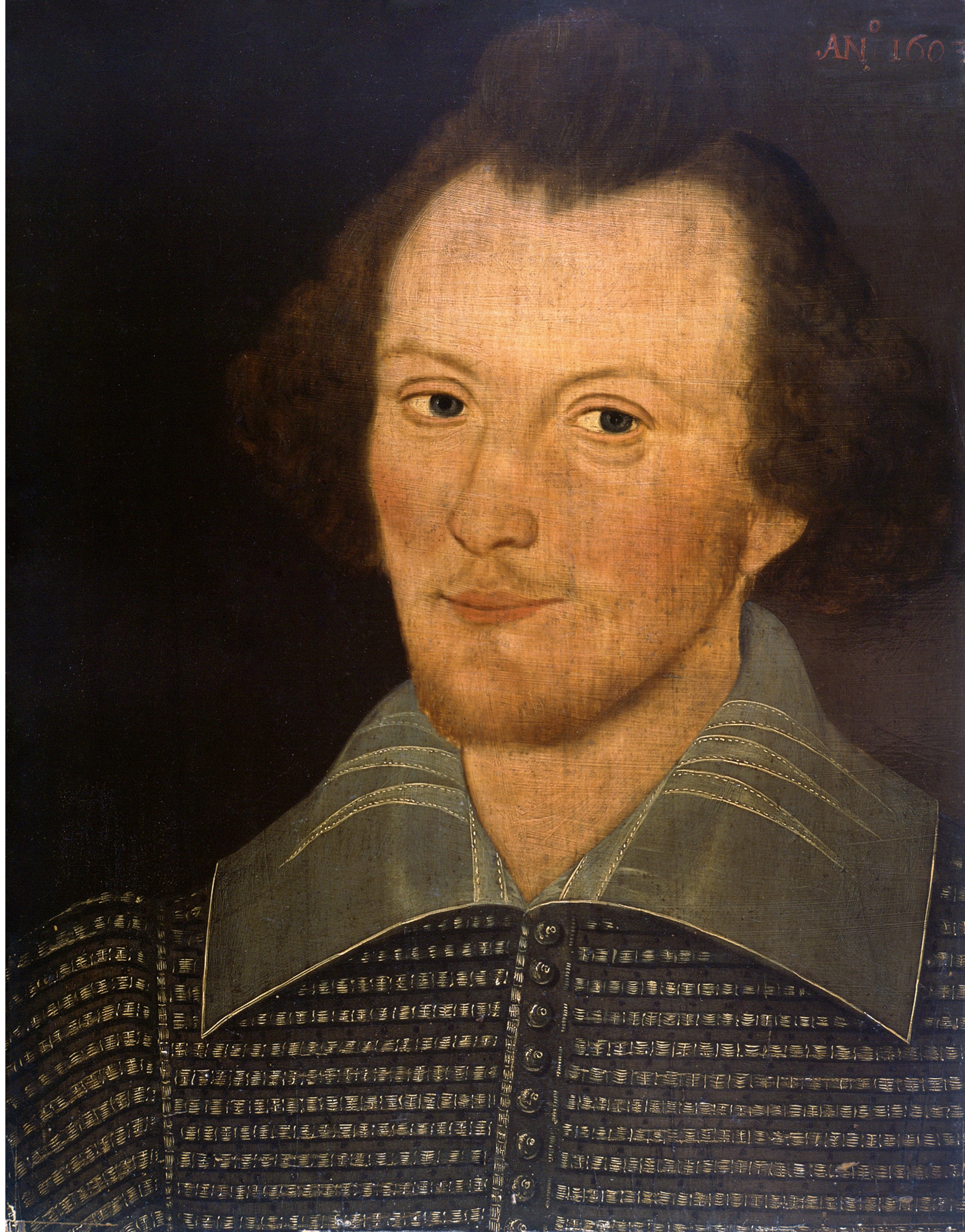
The Sanders portrait

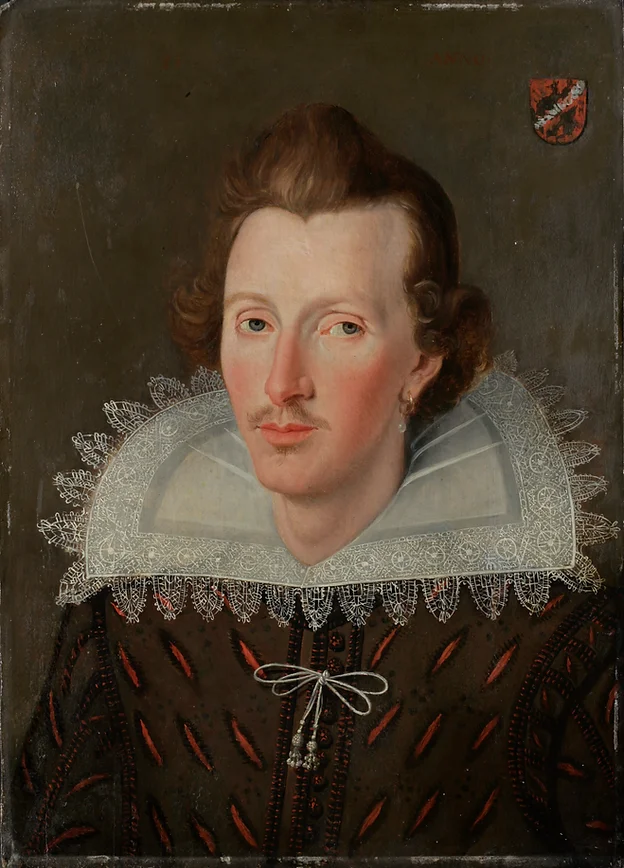
The Wadlow Portrait

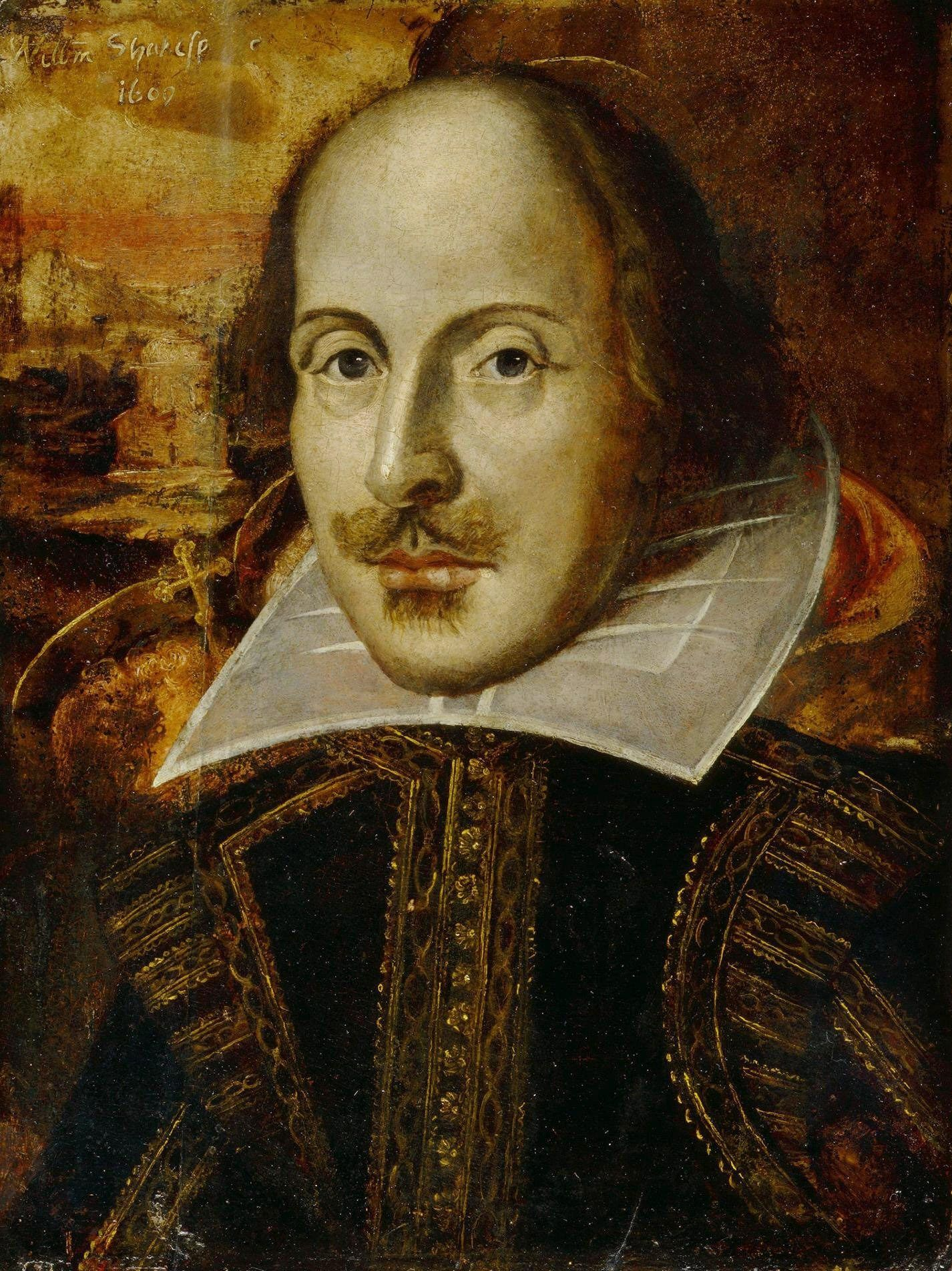
The Flower portrait (known to be a 19th-century forgery)

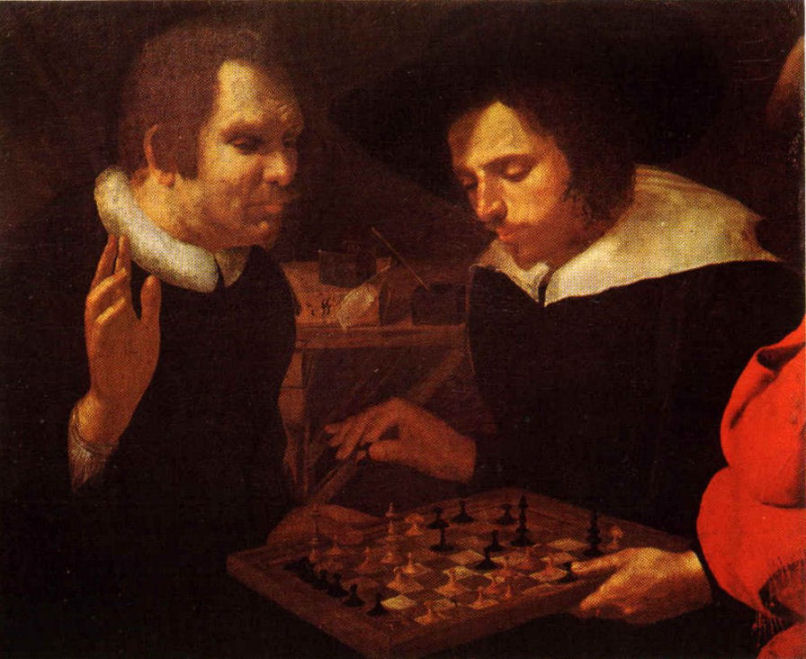
The Chess Players

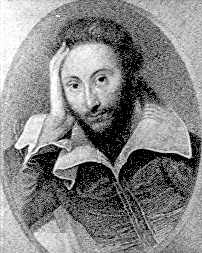
A print after the Zuccari portrait

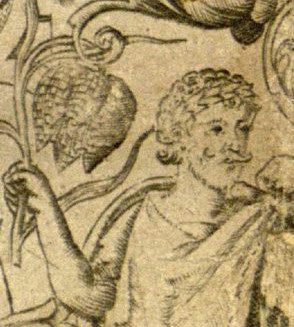
Reputed portrait in John Gerard's Herball

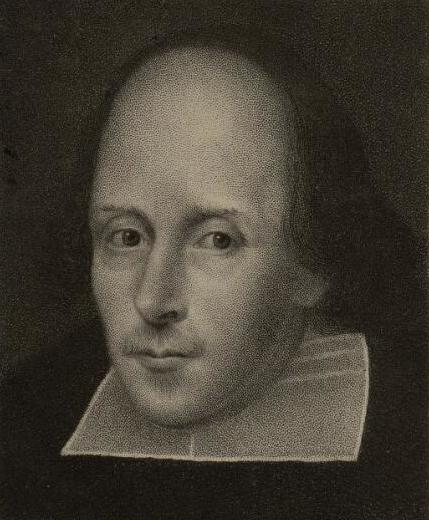
Engraving of The Felton portrait

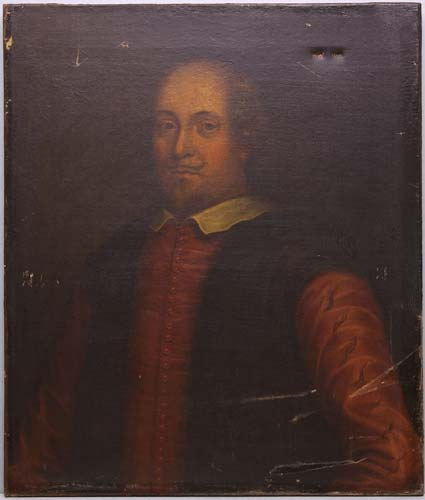
The Stratford portrait

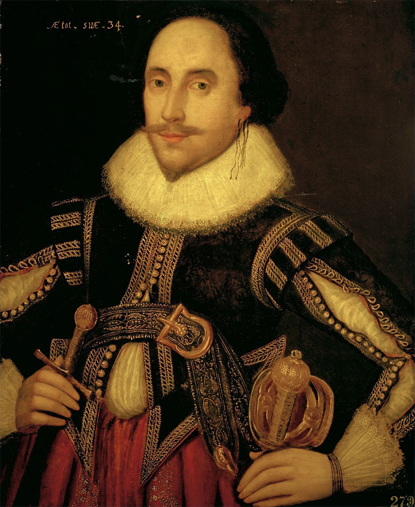
The Hampton Court portrait

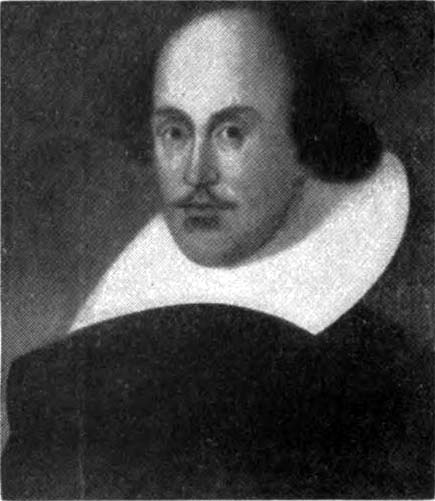
The Ely Palace portrait

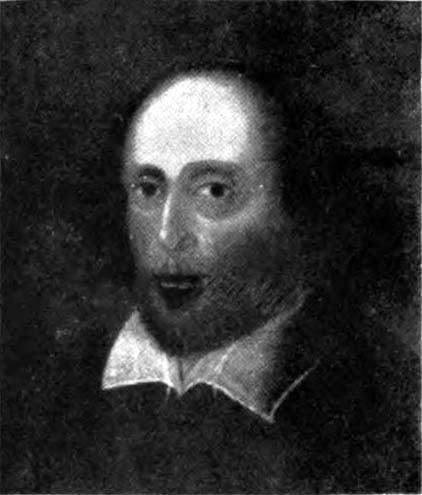
The Lumley portrait

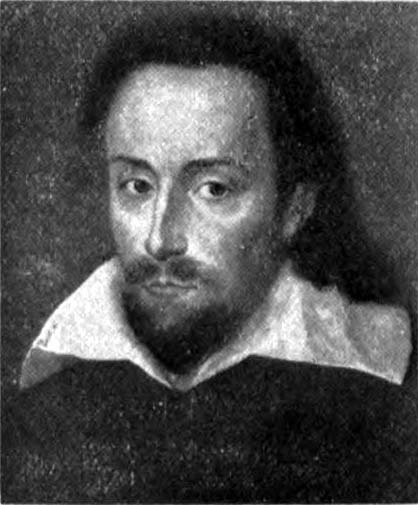
The Dunford portrait

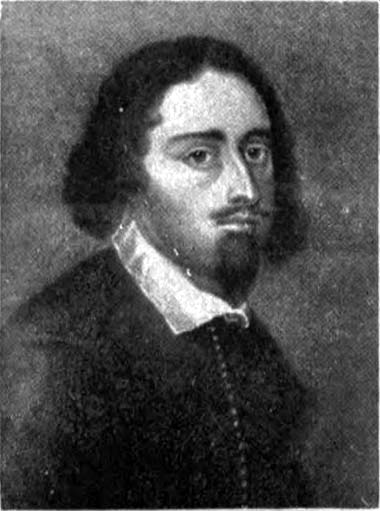
The Stace portrait

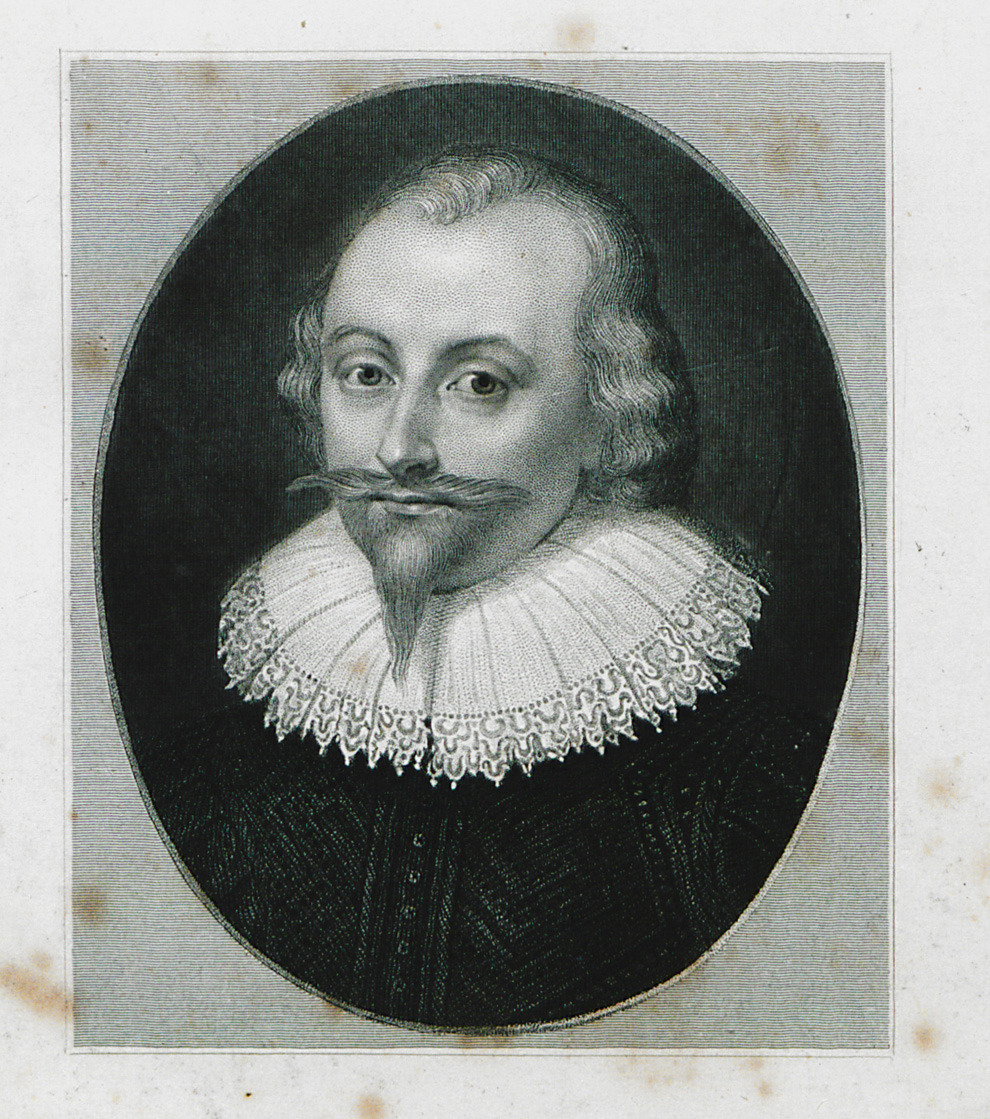
The Hilliard miniature

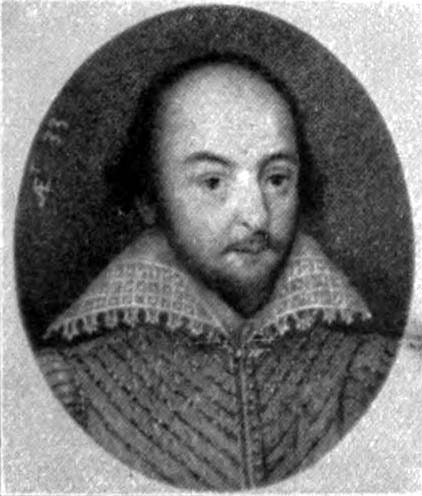
The Auriol miniature

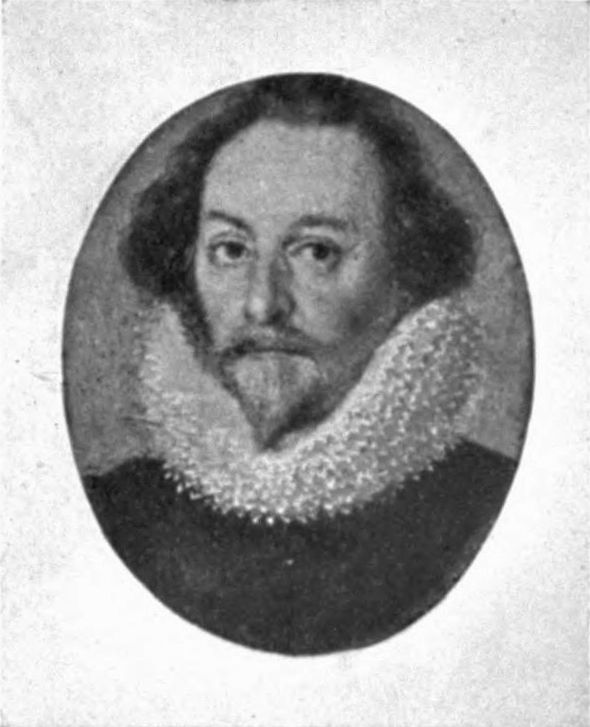
The Welbeck Abbey miniature

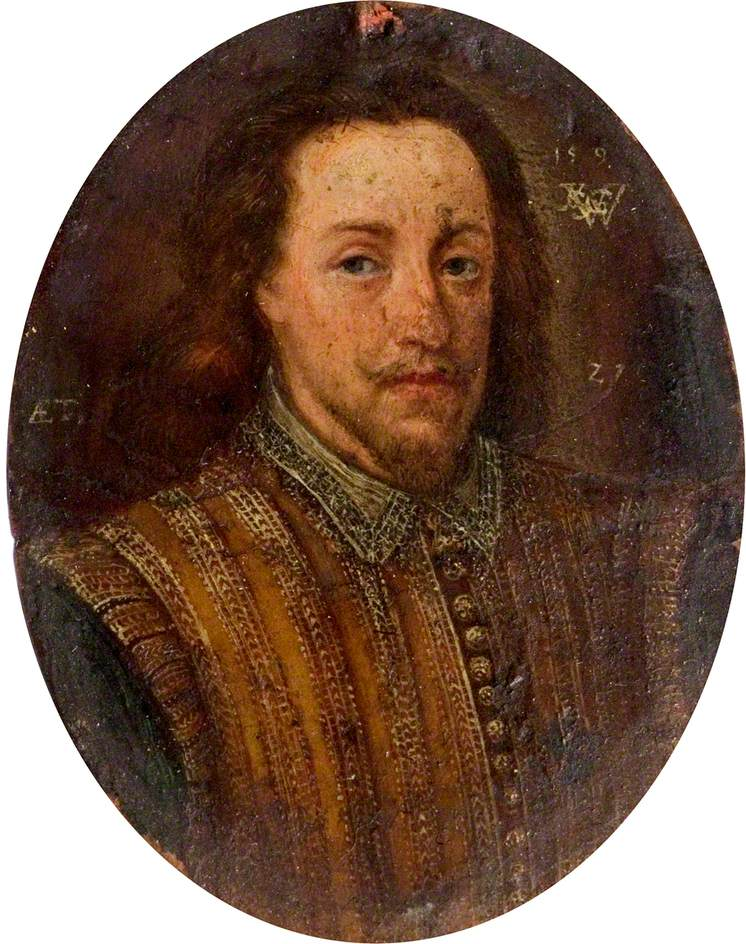
Portrait presented to the Shakespeare Memorial by Lord Ronald Sutherland Gower

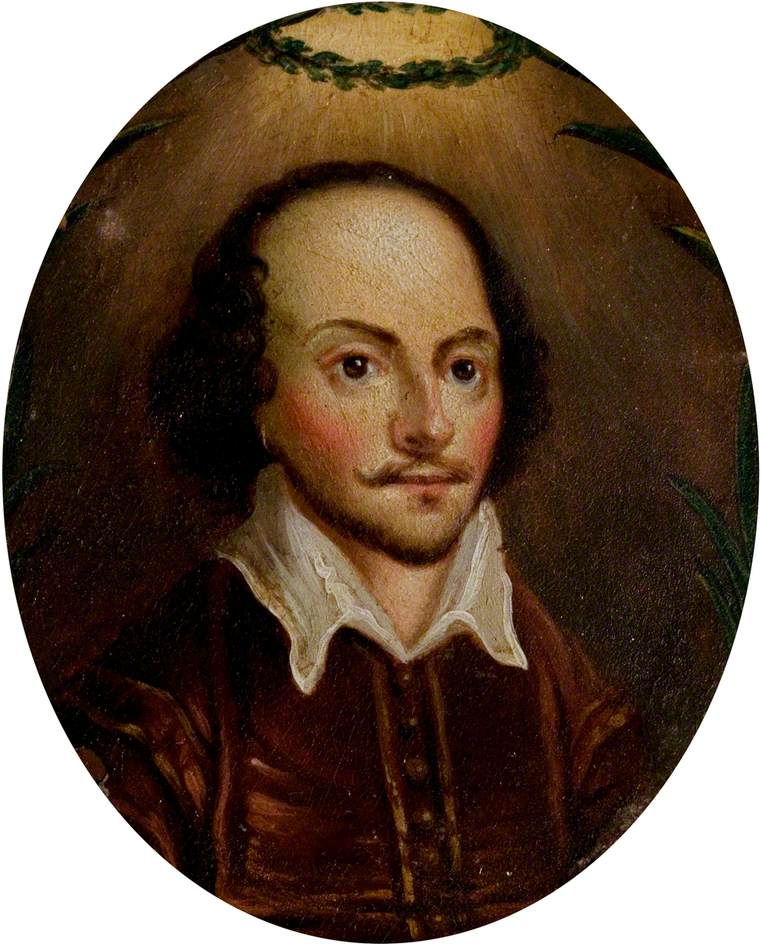
Portrait presented to the Shakespeare memorial by T. Kite, likely painted around 1650

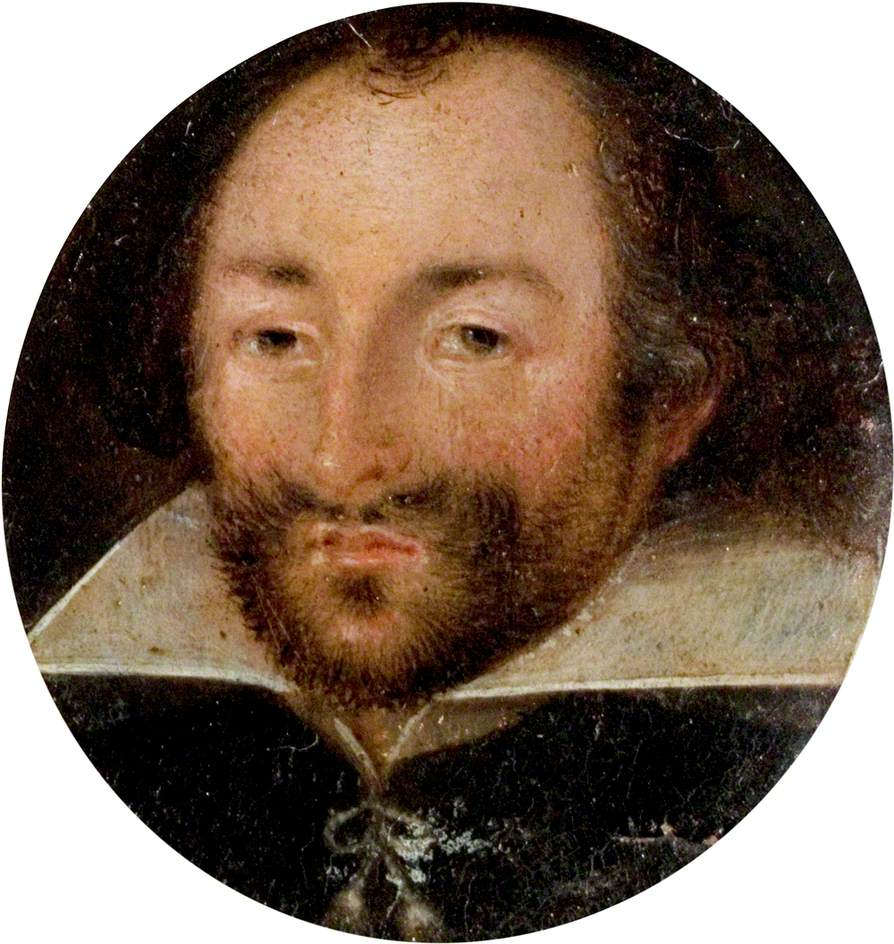
Portrait presented to the Shakespeare Memorial by Henry Graves

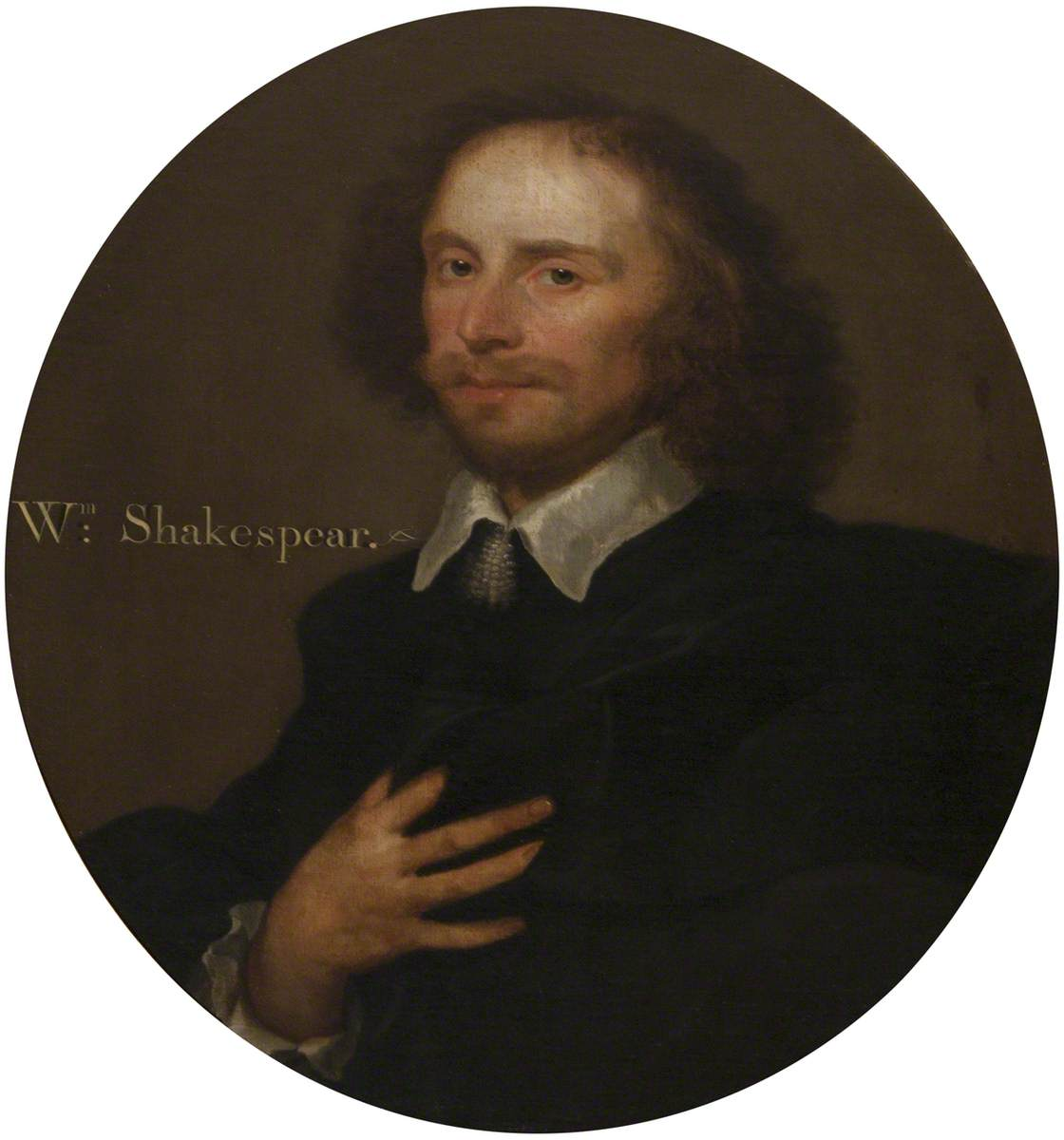
The Van Dyck portrait

=== Probably made within living memory of Shakespeare ===
In the decades after Shakespeare's death a number of portraits were made based on existing images or living memory. The most important of these are:

- The Soest portrait, probably painted by Gerard Soest. The painting was first described by George Vertue, who attributed it to Peter Lely and stated that it was painted from a man who was said to look like Shakespeare. It was owned by Thomas Wright of Covent Garden in 1725 when it was engraved by John Simon and attributed to Soest. It was probably painted in the late 1660s, after the Restoration permitted the reopening of the London theatres.
- The Chesterfield portrait, dated 1660–1670, possibly painted by the Dutch painter Pieter Borsseler, who worked in England in the second half of the 17th century. Its title derives from the fact that it was owned by the Earl of Chesterfield. It is generally assumed to be based on the Chandos portrait, which is evidence that the Chandos was accepted as a depiction of Shakespeare within living memory of the writer.
- The Marshall portrait. John Benson's 1640 edition of Shakespeare's poems included an engraving of Shakespeare by William Marshall. This is a stylised and reversed version of the Droeshout portrait.

==== Gallery: portraits probably made within living memory of Shakespeare ====
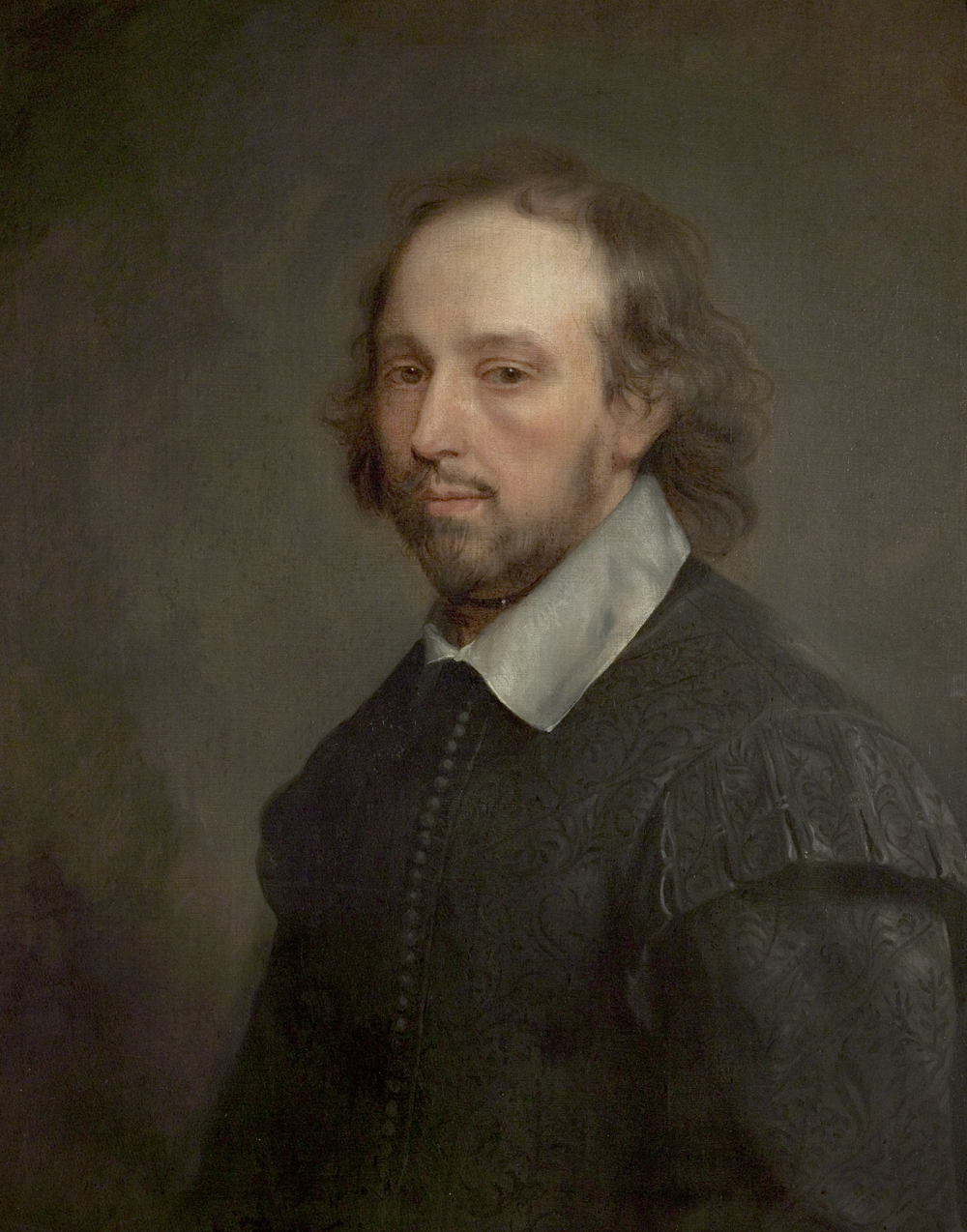
The Soest portrait, painted at least 20 years after Shakespeare's death

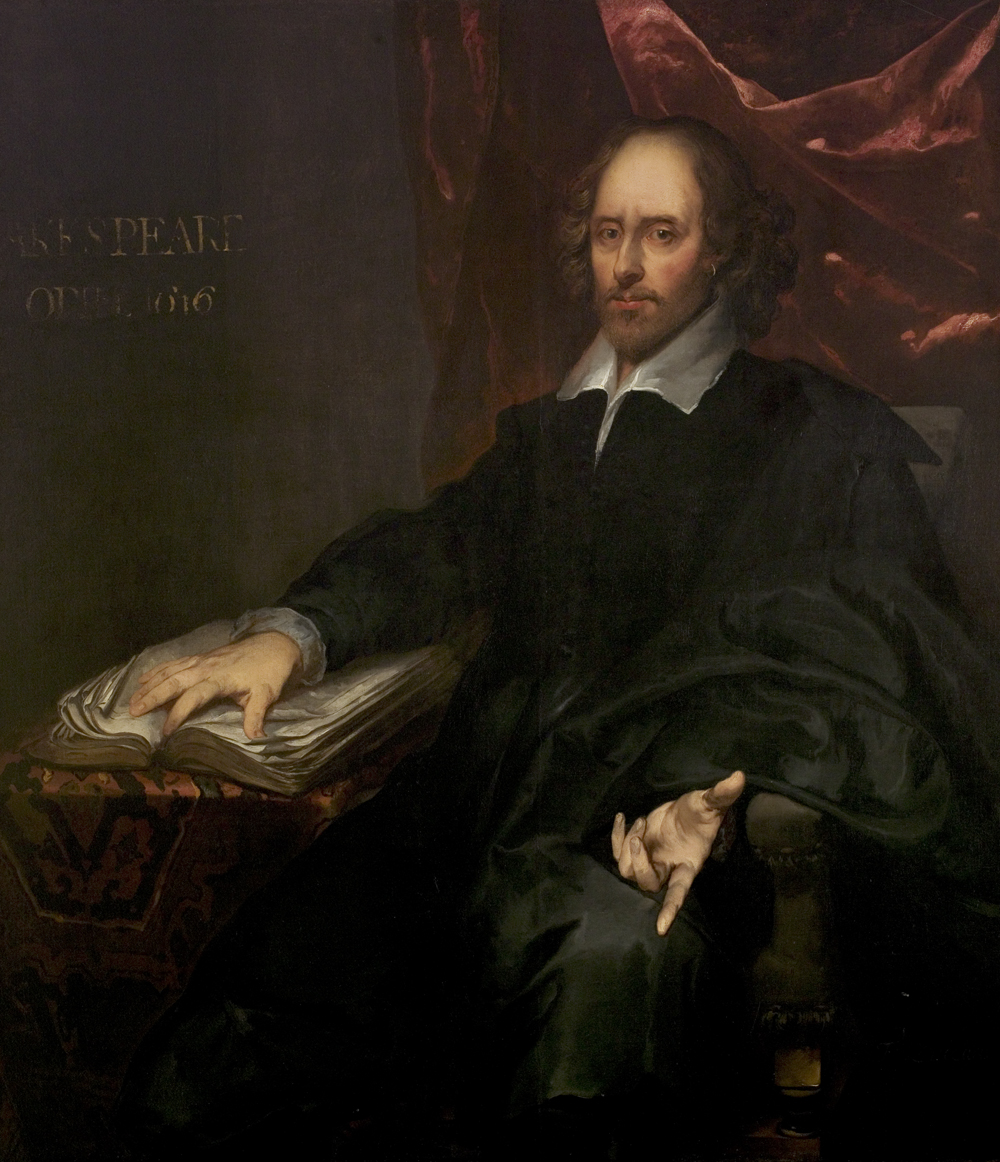
The Chesterfield portrait, attributed to Borsseler, and the earliest known aggrandized image of Shakespeare

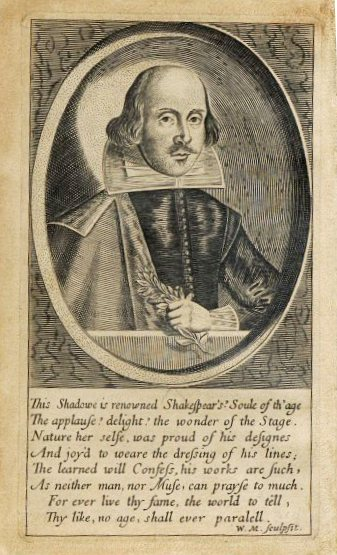
The Marshall portrait, made for John Benson's 1640 edition of Shakespeare's poems

== Later works, misidentifications, and fakes ==
A number of other copies or adaptations of the Chandos and Droeshout images were made in the later 17th century and early 18th century, such as William Faithorne's frontispiece of the 1655 edition of The Rape of Lucrece, and Louis Francois Roubiliac's copy of the Chandos, made as preparation for his sculpture of Shakespeare. These increased in number by the later 18th century and early 19th century, including an adaptation of Droeshout by William Blake (c. 1800) and prints by John Goldar, Richard Austin Artlett and others.

The Stratford portrait was also probably made at this time. The picture is so called as it is in Stratford upon Avon. The picture was owned by a Mr Hunt, who was a town-clerk of Stratford. It was at one time considered to be the model for the Stratford memorial sculpture, which it closely resembles, but is now thought to have been created in the 18th century, based on the sculpture.

The first known commercial use of Shakespeare's portrait in a public context was the 18th-century English bookseller Jacob Tonson's shop sign which depicted him. It is not known which image it was based on, but it may have been one of the surviving paintings based on the Chandos.

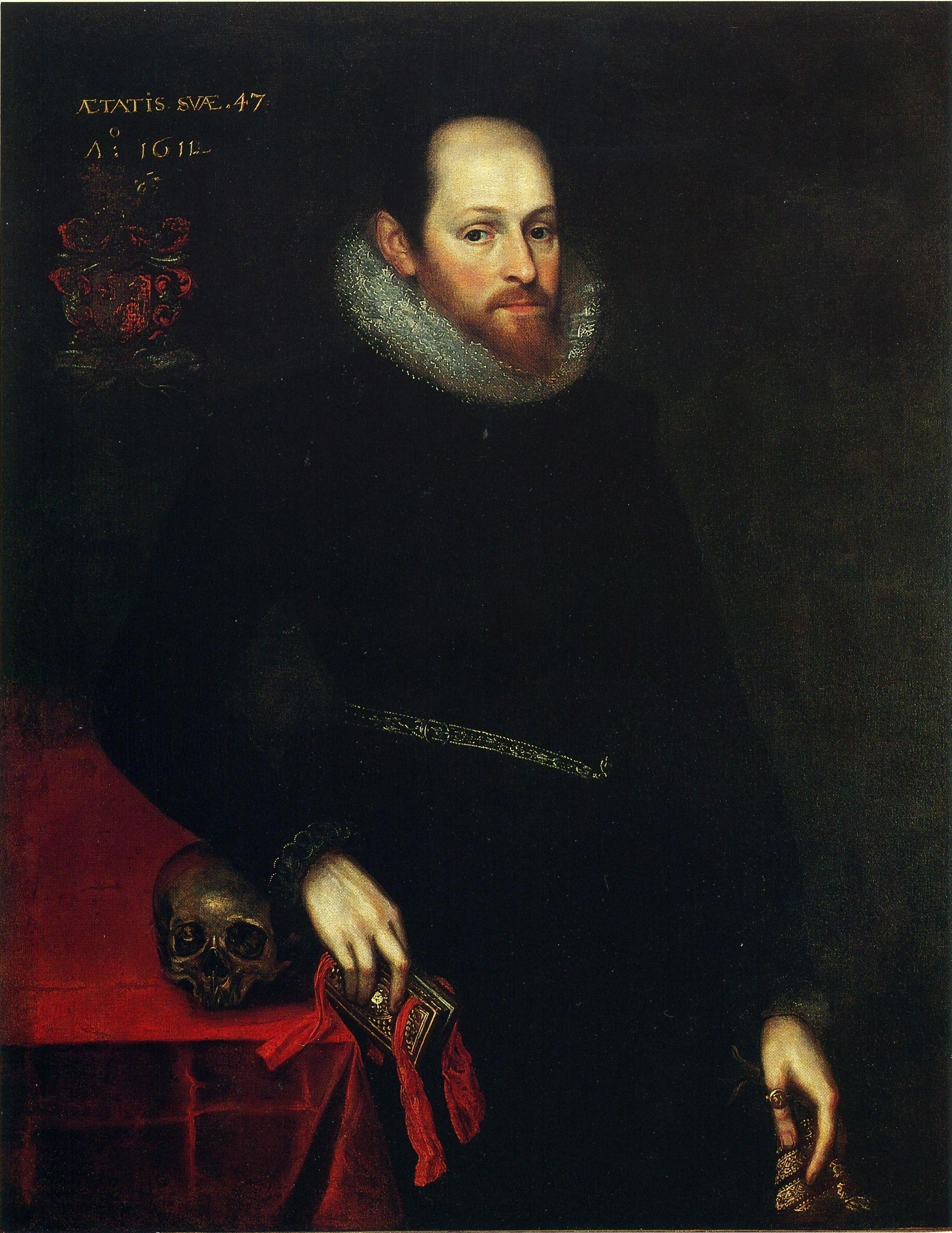
The Ashbourne portrait was reproduced in the 19th century as Shakespeare, but has been since identified as Hugh Hamersley

By the mid-18th century the demand for portraits of Shakespeare led to several claims regarding surviving 17th-century paintings, some of which were altered to make them conform more closely to Shakespeare's features. The Janssen portrait was overpainted, receding the hairline and adding an inscription with an age and date to fit Shakespeare's life. This was done before 1770, making it the "earliest proven example of a genuine portrait altered to look like Shakespeare." In 1792 a painting that came to be known as the Felton portrait appeared at an auction, with the name of Shakespeare on the back and the initials R.B., which were taken to be those of Richard Burbage. 18th century Shakespeare scholar George Steevens supported the authenticity of the work, which is similar to the Droeshout engraving.

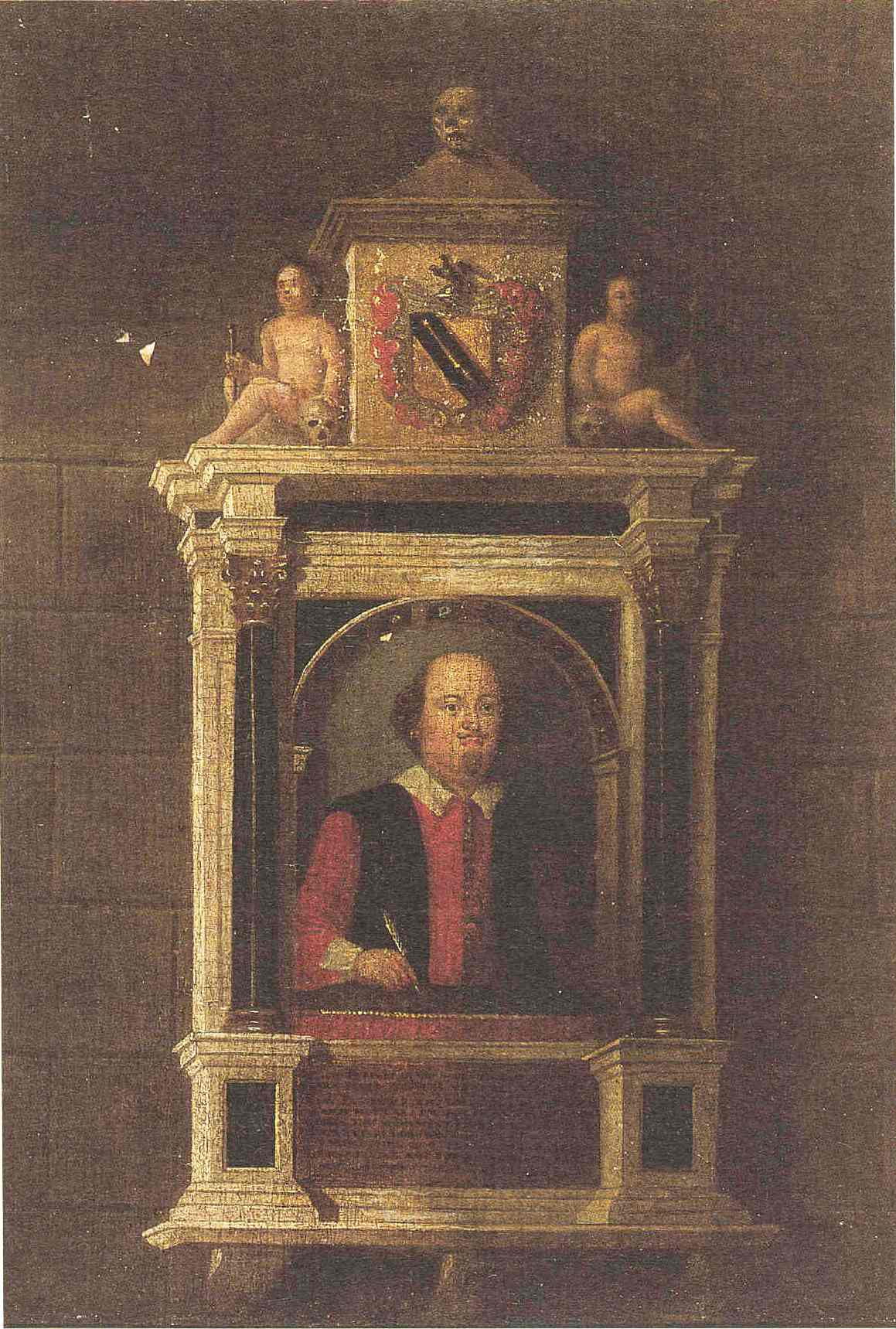
Painting of Shakespeare's funerary monument by John Hall, made before the monument's 1748–49 restoration.

A painting now called the Ashbourne portrait was identified as a portrayal of Shakespeare in 1847, and it currently hangs in the Folger Shakespeare Library. The painting was reproduced as Shakespeare in the mid-19th century as a mezzotint by G.F. Storm. In 1940 Charles Wisner Barrell examined the portrait using X-ray and infrared photography, as well as rubbings of the concealed paint on the sitter's thumb ring, and concluded that the painting was a retouched portrait of Edward de Vere, 17th Earl of Oxford, painted by Cornelius Ketel. In 1979, the painting was restored, and a coat of arms uncovered which identified the sitter as Hugh Hamersley. The restoration revealed that the portrait had been retouched to have the hairline recede, while the inscribed age had been altered by one year and Hamersley's coat of arms had been painted over. Nevertheless, some Oxfordians continue to support the de Vere identification, claiming that the fashions worn by the sitter date the painting to about 1580 when Hamersley would have been only 15.

Another example is the Flower portrait, named for its owner, Sir Desmond Flower, who donated it to the Shakespeare Museum in 1911. This was once thought to be the earliest painting depicting Shakespeare, and the model for the Droeshout engraving. It was shown in a 2005 National Portrait Gallery investigation to be a 19th-century fake adapted from the engraving. The image of Shakespeare was painted over an authentic 16th-century painting of a Madonna and child.

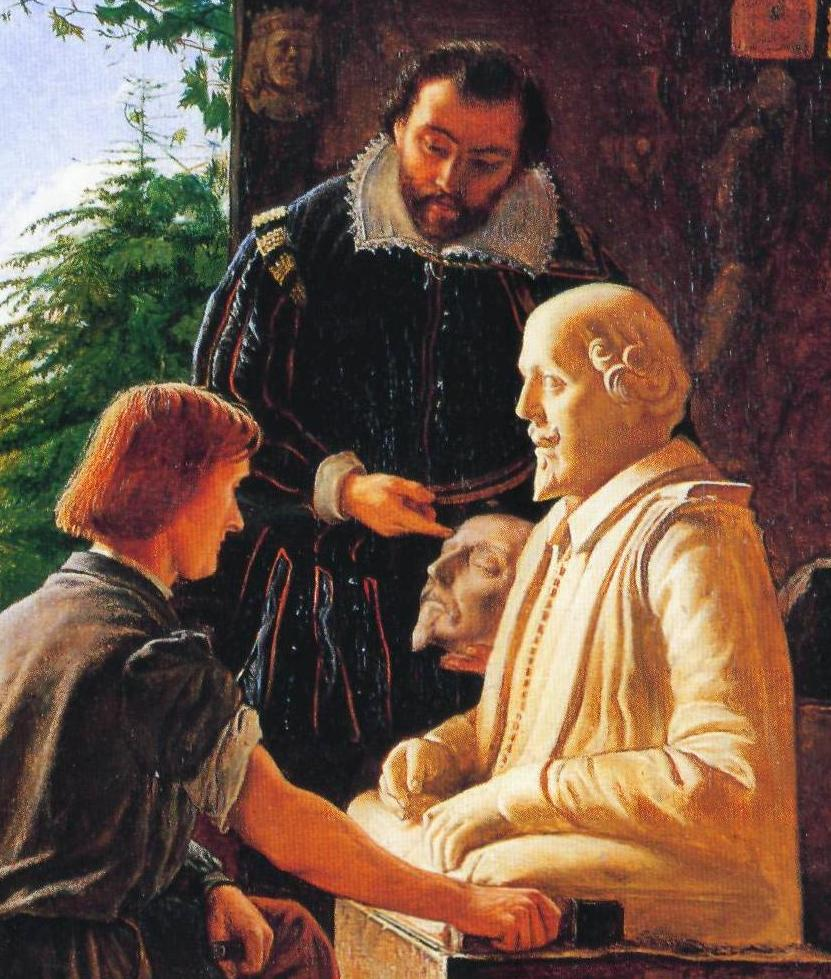
A detail of Henry Wallis's 1857 painting depicting Gerard Johnson carving the Stratford monument, while Ben Jonson shows him the Kesselstadt death mask

In 1849 a death mask was made public by a German artist, Ludwig Becker, who linked it to a painting which, he claimed, depicted Shakespeare and resembled the mask. The mask, known as the "Kesselstadt death mask" was given publicity when it was declared authentic by the scientist Richard Owen, who also claimed that the Stratford memorial was based on it. The artist Henry Wallis painted a picture depicting the sculptor working on the monument while looking at the mask. The sculptor Lord Ronald Gower also believed in the authenticity of the mask. When he created the large public Shakespeare statue in Stratford in 1888, he based the facial features on it. He also attempted to buy it for the nation. The mask is now generally believed to be a fake, though its authenticity claim was revived in 1998.

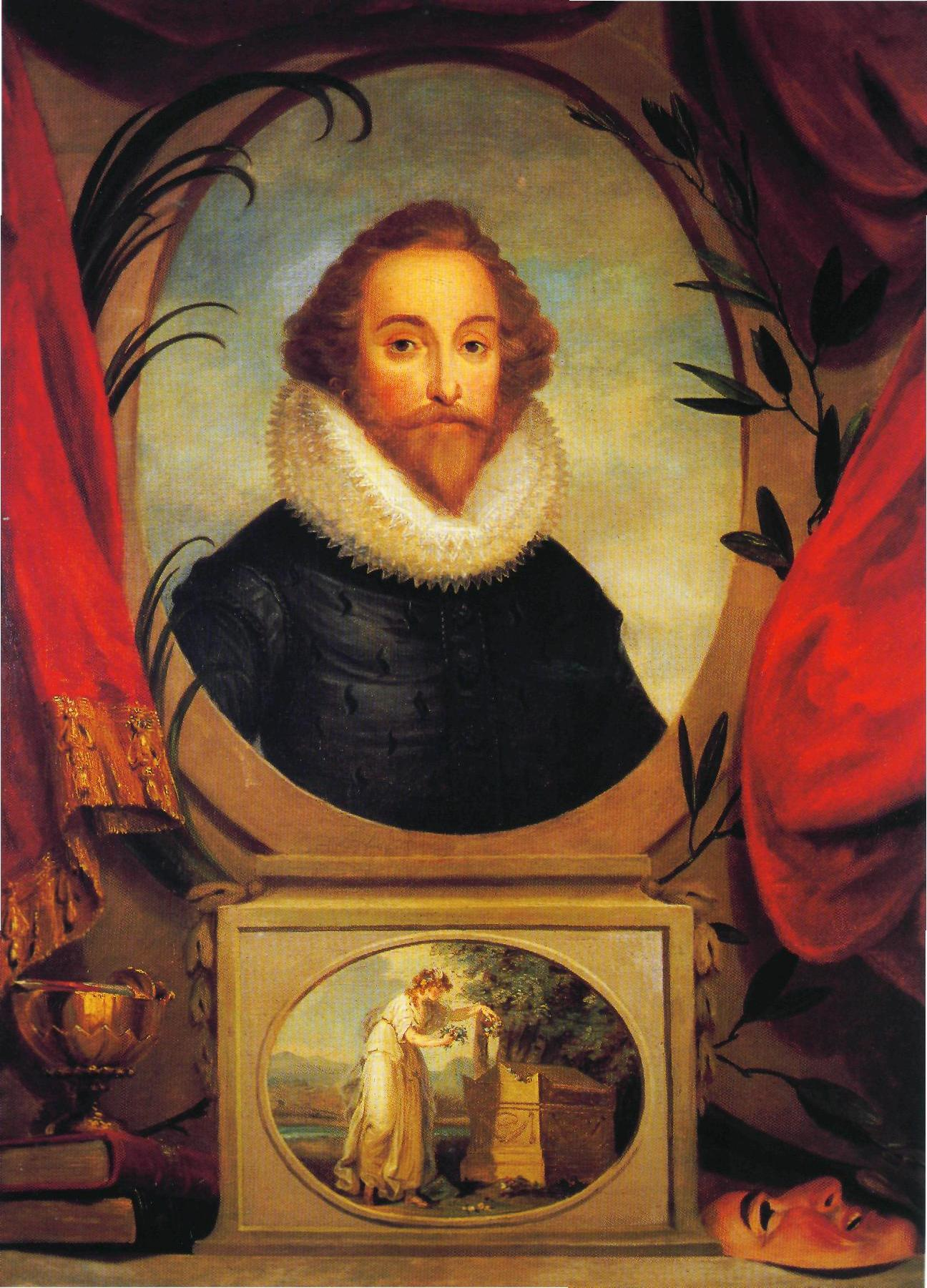
Kauffmann's Ideal Portrait of Shakespeare

Other artists created new portraits designed to portray Shakespeare as an intellectual hero. Angelica Kauffman's Ideal Portrait of Shakespeare was based on Vertue's frontispiece to Alexander Pope's edition of Shakespeare's works, which in its turn bases on the so-called Welbeck Abbey Miniature by an unknown author. Below the portrait is a symbolic figure of Fame adorning Shakespeare's tomb. In 1849 Ford Madox Brown adapted various images, including the Ashbourne Hamersley, to create a synthetic portrayal which he believed was as authentic a depiction as possible. It showed Shakespeare as a commanding figure in a richly decorated room. On his desk are books representing Shakespeare's sources, including the works of Boccaccio and Chaucer. In a similar vein, John Faed depicted Shakespeare at the centre of a gathering of scholars and writers in his painting Shakespeare and his Friends at the Mermaid Tavern (1850).

== Narrative and allegorical works ==
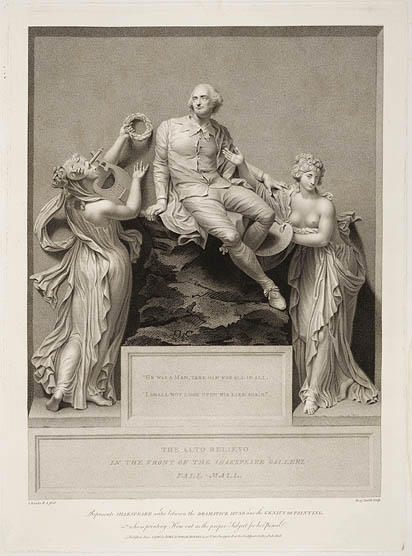
Engraving of Thomas Banks' sculpture.

From the mid-18th century a number of paintings and sculptures were made which depicted Shakespeare as part of narrative or allegorical scenario symbolising his genius.

=== Allegories ===
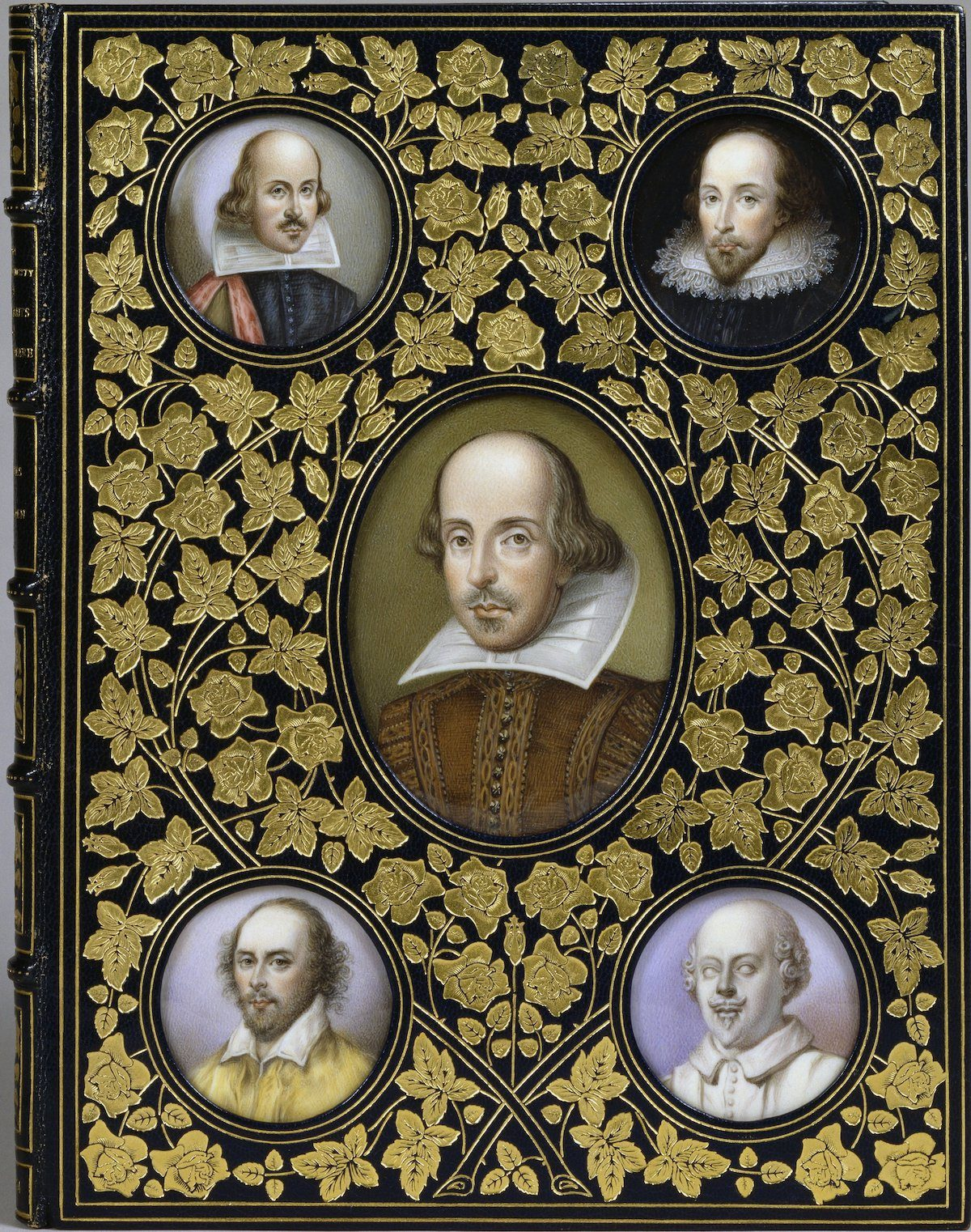
Currie's Five Faces of Shakespeare, a Cosway binding from 1928 that contains 5 miniatures painted by Caroline Billin Currie that contain copies of the Marshall portrait (top left), the Janssen portrait (top right), the Droeshout portrait (center), the Chandos portrait (bottom left), and the Stratford monument (bottom right).

In addition to her Ideal Portrait, Angelica Kauffman created the allegorical The Birth of Shakespeare (c. 1770), which depicted the baby Shakespeare with the personification of Fantasy and the muses of Tragedy and Comedy. At the bottom of the composition are a scepter, a crown, and the mask of tragedy, portending the child's brilliant future. George Romney painted a similar picture of a baby Shakespeare surrounded by symbolic figures entitled The Infant Shakespeare attended by Nature and the Passions. According to the description, "Nature is represented with her face unveiled to her favourite Child, who is placed between Joy and Sorrow. On the right of Nature are Love, Hatred & Jealousy; on her left hand, Anger, Envy, & Fear." Romney also painted a simpler version of the scene entitled Shakespeare nursed by Tragedy and Comedy.

Another allegory is present in Thomas Banks' Shakespeare attended by Painting and Poetry, in which the poet is glorified by symbolic figures lauding his creative genius.

=== Narratives ===
In the same period artists began to depict real or imagined scenes from Shakespeare's life, which were sometimes popularised as prints. The popularity of such scenes was especially high in the Victorian era. Most popular was the apocryphal story of the young Shakespeare being brought before Sir Thomas Lucy on the charge of poaching, which was depicted by several artists. The more respectable and patriotic scene of Shakespeare reading his work to Queen Elizabeth I was also painted by several artists, such as John James Chalon.

== Modern works ==
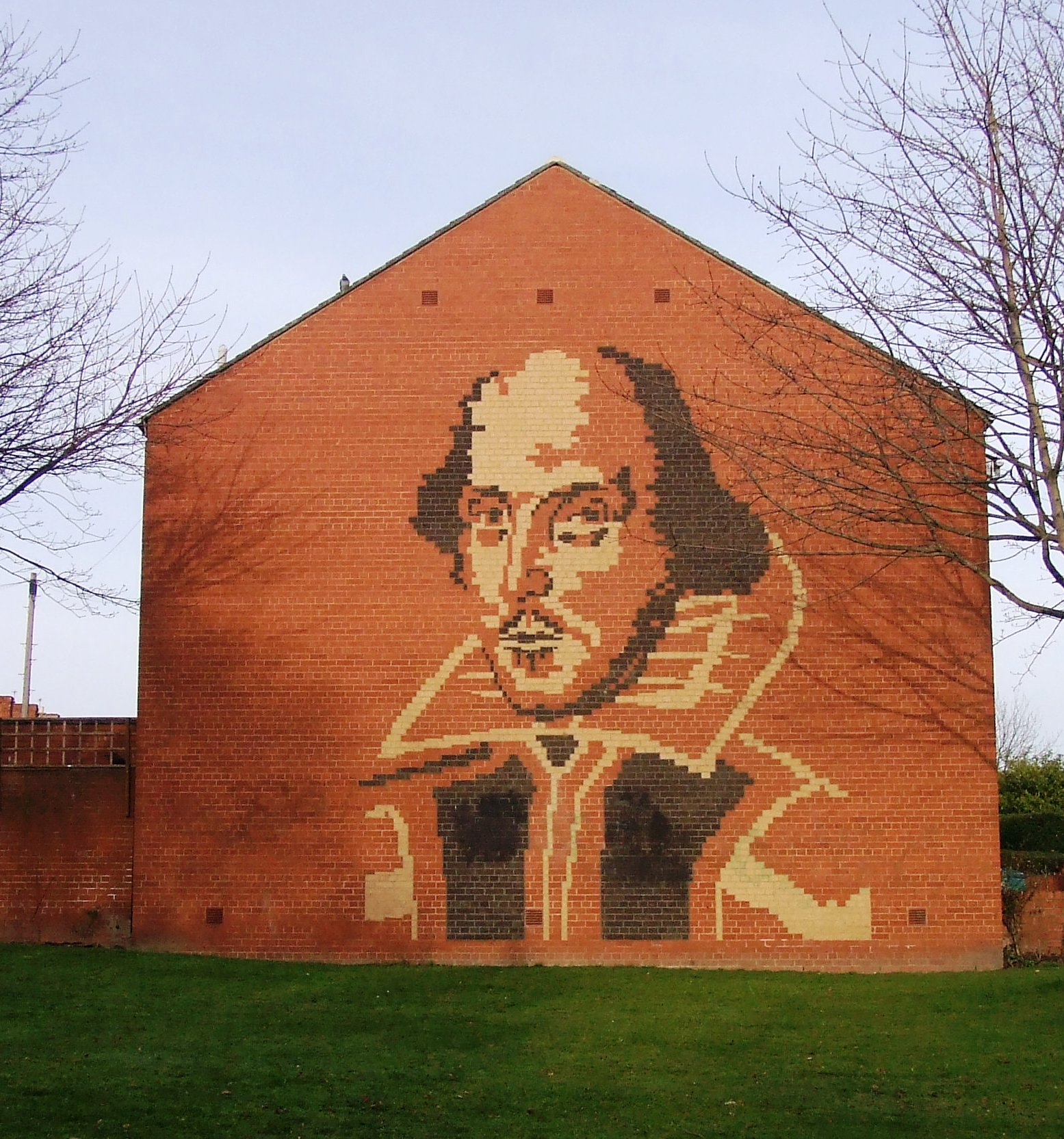
A stylised version of the Droeshout portrait in the brickwork of a house on Stratford Road, Heaton, Newcastle upon Tyne

By the end of the 19th century portraits and statues of Shakespeare were appearing in numerous contexts, and his stereotyped features were being used in advertisements, cartoons, shops, pub signs and buildings. Such images proliferated in the 20th century. In Britain Shakespeare's Head and The Shakespeare Arms became popular names for pubs. Between 1970 and 1993, an image of the Westminster abbey statue of Shakespeare appeared on the reverse of British £20 notes.

The ubiquity of these stereotyped features has led to adaptations of Shakespeare portraits by several modern artists. In 1964, for the 400th anniversary of Shakespeare's birth, Pablo Picasso created numerous variations on the theme of Shakespeare's face reduced to minimal form in a few simple lines. Louis Aragon wrote an essay to accompany the drawings.

More recently graphic designers have played with the conventional motifs in Shakespeare's features. These include Rafał Olbiński's Shakespeare in Central Park, Festival poster (1994), an exhibition poster used by the Victoria and Albert Museum and Mirko Ilić's Shakespeare illustration in The New York Times (1996). Milton Glaser also created 25 Shakespeare Faces, a theater poster in 2003.

In 2000 István Orosz created a double anamorphic portrait for the Swan Theatre.

In 2013 Lego introduced a Shakespeare minifigure.

In 2024, Graham Short British micro-artist produced the smallest portrait in the world of William Shakespeare for the Royal Shakespeare Trust in Stratford upon Avon. The engraving is on a speck of gold inside the eye of a needle.

== See also ==
- Marlowe portrait
