= Pieter Borsseler =

Dutch painter

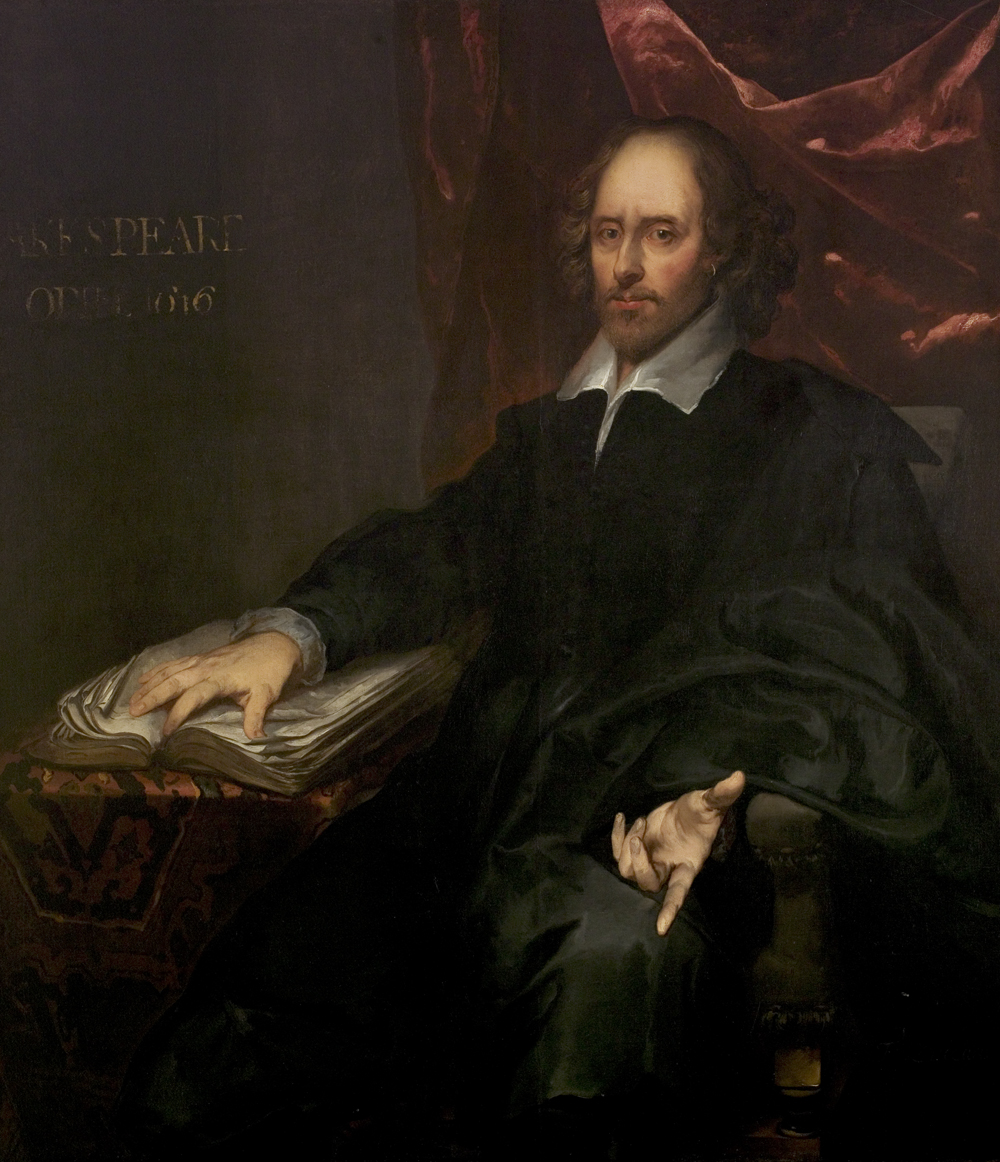
The Chesterfield portrait, attributed to Borsseler, possibly the earliest aggrandized Portrait of Shakespeare.

Pieter Borsseler or Pieter Borselaer (1633/1634 Middelburg - in or after 1687, Middelburg) was a Dutch portrait painter who was prominent in England during the second half of the 17th century.

Borsseler was born in Middelburg. He was a student of Thomas Willeboirts Bosschaert in Antwerp between 1651 and 1654. He eventually returned to Middelburg, but painted between 1665 and 1679 in England. In 1681 he is reported to be in The Hague and from 1684 and 1687 in Middelburg again.

Borsseler's earliest known dated work is from 1664, but his signature work was his painting of the antiquarian Sir William Dugdale (1665), which established his distinctive sober and melancholic style. Borsseler also painted the portraits of Dugdale's wife and of Orlando Bridgman that are at Dugdale's seat of Merevale Hall. Several paintings of the Hoby family are at Bisham Abbey, Buckinghamshire, most notably his sensitive picture of the elderly Mrs Peregrine Hoby.

Borsseler also painted the writer Samuel Butler, now in the National Portrait Gallery, and was probably responsible for the posthumous "Chesterfield portrait" of William Shakespeare, which is based on the Chandos portrait. His studio may also have painted the anonymous portrait of a woman now in the National Gallery.

Borsseler's style is closest to fellow Anglo-Dutch artist Gerard Soest, who coincidentally also painted Butler and a posthumous portrait of Shakespeare.
