= Jenny Tiramani =

British custume and stage designer

Jennifer Jane Tiramani (born 16 August 1954) is a British costume, stage and production designer. Since 2012 she has been principal of the School of Historical Dress in London.

== Early life ==
Tiramani was born on 16 August 1954, the daughter of Fredo Paulo Tiramani and Barbara Doreen Tiramani née King. She attended Dartford Grammar School for Girls. She completed a foundation course at the Central School of Art and Design in London and then received a first class diploma in Theatre Design from Trent Polytechnic in 1976.

== Career ==
From 1980 to 1997, Tiramani was an associate designer at the Theatre Royal Stratford East. From 1997 to 2002 she held the same position at Shakespeare's Globe in Southwark, and from 2003 to 2005 was director of theatre design there. From 2008 to 2011 she was a visiting professor at the School of Art and Design of Nottingham Trent University.

As an expert on Elizabethan and Jacobean clothing she evaluated the Sanders portrait of William Shakespeare and was an advisor to the Searching for Shakespeare exhibition at the National Portrait Gallery in 2006.

== Work ==
Tiramani has designed opera costumes for productions including Orlando for the Opéra de Lille in 2010, La Clemenza di Tito at the Festival International d'Art Lyrique d'Aix-en-Provence in 2011 and Anna Bolena at the Metropolitan Opera of New York in 2012.

== Awards ==
Year	Plays	Theatre of Performance	Accolades
2003	Twelfth Night	Shakespeare's Globe, London	Won Laurence Olivier Award for Best Costume Design
2007	Design work from 1997 to 2005	Shakespeare's Globe	Won Sam Wanamaker Award together with Claire van Kampen and Mark Rylance, for pioneering work in Shakespearean theatre
2014	Twelfth Night	Apollo Theatre, London	Nominations for Drama Desk Award for Outstanding Costume Design and Laurence Olivier Award for Best Costume Design
2014	Twelfth Night	Belasco Theatre, Broadway	Won at the 2014 Tony Awards the Tony Award for Best Costume Design in a Play, Nomination for Outer Critics Circle Award for Best Costume Design

== Publications ==
- Janet Arnold, Jenny Tiramani, Santina Levey: Patterns of Fashion 4: The cut and construction of linen shirts, smocks, neckwear, headwear and accessories for men and women c. 1540 - 1660. Macmillan, November 2008. Paperback. ISBN 978-0-33357-08-21.
- Jenny Tiramani, Luca Costigliolo, Claire Thornton, Armelle Lucas and Christine Prentis, Susan North (editor): Seventeenth-Century Women's Dress Patterns (Book 1). V&A Publishing, April 2011. Hardcover. ISBN 978-1-85177-63-13.
- Jenny Tiramani, Susan North (editor): Seventeenth-Century Women's Dress Patterns (Book 2). V&A Publishing, April 2013. Hardcover. ISBN 978-1-85177-68-56.
- Alan Hopkins, Jenny Tiramani (series editor): Footwear: Shoes and Boots from the Hopkins Collection c. 1730 - 1950. Hardcover February 2015 (in print)
- Ulinka Rublack, Maria Hayward, Jenny Tiramani: The First Book of Fashion: The Book of Clothes of Matthaeus and Veit Konrad Schwarz of Augsburg. Hardcover. October 2015 (in print)
