= Grafton portrait =

Portrait claimed to be of William Shakespeare

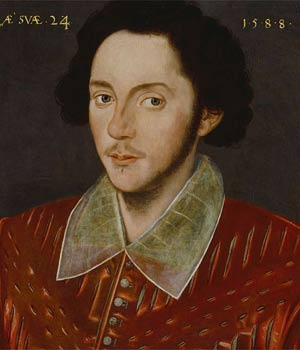
- Year: 1588
- Medium: Panel painting
- Subject: Unknown; possibly William Shakespeare
- Owner: John Rylands Library

The Grafton portrait is an anonymous Elizabethan panel painting, depicting a young man who has been suggested to be William Shakespeare. It bears the inscriptions 'Ae suae 24' and '1.5.8.8', indicating that the subject was in his 24th year in 1588.

== History ==
The portrait was painted by an unknown artist in 1588 and depicts a 24-year-old man. The painting was owned by Henry Wriothesley, 3rd Earl of Southampton who placed it within Grafton Manor, a large royal hunting lodge in Grafton Regis, Northamptonshire. The manor was destroyed in 1643 and the painting was moved to a farmhouse in the village. It reappeared in 1907 in Darlington and a photo was published in the Manchester Guardian. In May 1914, Thomas Kay donated the painting to the John Rylands Library at the University of Manchester, where it remains as of 2026.

It's a panel painting, made on a board of English oak.

== Identification ==
While Shakespeare scholar Peter Ackroyd and some other experts suggest that it is a portrait of the young William Shakespeare, the John Rylands Library has refrained from identifying the subject. A nine-month specialist analysis of the oil painting by the National Portrait Gallery concluded that there was no evidence to suggest that it could be a portrait of Shakespeare other than the age of the subject, and the initials 'WS' on the back which they concluded were added in the 19th century. Curator Tarnya Cooper also suggested that the style of clothing depicted, including a costly silk scarlet jacket, was incompatible with Shakespeare's likely financial situation in 1588. She says that the portrait has "fuelled the kind of Shakespeare in Love theories of the 21st Century, of a beautiful young man with a sensitive and passionate face, of a character with an incredible emotional range".

Writer Germaine Greer suggests that the subject of the portrait is the same as that of the 1585 portrait at Corpus Christi College, Cambridge which has been proposed to depict Christopher Marlowe.

== See also ==
- Portraits of Shakespeare
