= Santina M. Levey =

British costume and textiles historian, conservator, and author (1938–2017)

- Born: Santina Margaret Levey; 25 April 1938; Nottinghamshire, England, United Kingdom
- Died: 26 August 2017 (aged 79); Leicester, Leicestershire. England
- Education: University of Leicester
- Occupations: Author; Costume and textiles historian Conservator
- Employer: Victoria and Albert Museum

Santina Margaret Levey FSA (25 April 1938 – 26 August 2017) was an English costume and textiles historian, conservator, and author. She began her museum career in Northampton and became an expert in 16th and 17th century textiles. Levey worked for the Victoria and Albert Museum in its department of textiles and as its keeper of textiles. She authored various articles, books and conducted other textile research and wrote for some journals.

== Early life and education ==
In April 1938, Levey was born in Nottinghamshire, the second of three children in her family. When the Second World War broke out, she and the rest of her family relocated to Leicester, where school teachers were bemused with her handwriting and spelling but recognised her intelligence and artistic ability. Levey studied for an history degree at the University of Leeds and went on to take a post-graduate teaching degree in Leicester.

== Career ==
She briefly taught as a teacher, before she went on to begin her museum career in Northampton. There, Levey learnt how to lace, and subsequently became an expert in 16th and 17th century textiles. She later was appointed Norwich Museum's keeper of social history, giving her responsibility for three medieval foundation buildings, a church and a duo of museums, until she won an open competition for the post of department of textiles at the Victoria and Albert Museum (V&A) in the late 1960s. Important scholarly books on lace were written during this period, including Lace: A History, and Le Pompe: 1559: Patterns for Venetian Bobbin Lace. In 1989, Levey was required to resign her role as the last V&A's keeper of textiles that she had held between 1981 and 1989 as a consequence of a major staff restructuring, but she was able to get work as a consultant and an independent scholar researching in Europe. She presented lectures on "Fashion and Lace: A Complex Relation" and "Art and Industry: Lace-Making in the Nineteenth Century" at the Texas Memorial Museum in May 1990.

Levey provided advice and assistance to the Bowes Museum and had begun cataloguing the Blackborne Lace Collection in the late 1990s to which she was instrumental in having it installed in the Bowes Museum and contributed to the catalog of the exhibit. She was a director of The Textile Conservation Foundation from 26 May 1991 to 9 February 2011 as well as of The Embroiderers' Guild between 23 March 1995 and 27 March 1999. Levey regularly visited Norfolk's The Textile Conservation Studio, which saw work being done on embroideries from Hardwick Hall, producing related volumes, focusing on Elizabethan textiles, Bess of Hardwick's inventories, and a catalog on exquisite embroidery needlework and other materials such as the tapestries. She examined the materials in detail and was open-minded to new discoveries. Levey began working on examining Hardwick's ecclesiastical textiles in 2002, which May Berkouwer considered, but Levey was unable to finish the project. From 2000 to 2009, she was a trustee of the Bowes Museum, championing curatorship, importance of museums worldwide and scholarship, and was instrumental in clinching the donation of a private collection of lace in Great Britain. Levey was appointed vice-president of the Centre International d'Etude des Textiles Anciens.

She was a board member of the editorial panel of the journal Costume from 2005 to 2009 and was a frequent reviewer of books. Levey authored several articles, books and other research on textiles. She also wrote for the journals Textile History; Costume as well as for the National Trust. She established the School of Historical Dress and became a trustee of it, and collaborated with Janet Arnold and Jenny Tiramani to make "The Cut and Construction of Linen Shirts, Smocks, Neckwear, Headwear and Accessories for Men and Women C. 1540–1660" Volume 4 of the Patterns of Fashion series. Levey was a Fellow of the Society of Antiquaries of London and held a Bachelor of Arts degree as well as a Doctor of Letters.

== Death ==
Levey's health deteriorated towards the end of her life and she required the support of her family. She died on 26 August 2017 and received a funeral service at the Quaker Meeting House, Leicester on 15 September. Levey was cremated at Gilroes Crematorium.

== Personality and legacy ==
Ksynia Marko of the National Trust described Levey as "a thoughtful mentor and a great encourager of others, being endlessly supportive, selfless and generous – and fun to be with." Anne Swift, writing for Antiques Trade Gazette, wrote Levey's legacy would be she would be a person remembered for "her kindness, her generosity in sharing her time and knowledge, but most of all for her humility." Clare W. Browne said of Levey's work: "Her publications on historical embroidery and lace are fundamental to the study of their subjects."
