= Marlowe portrait =

Portrait said to be of Christopher Marlowe

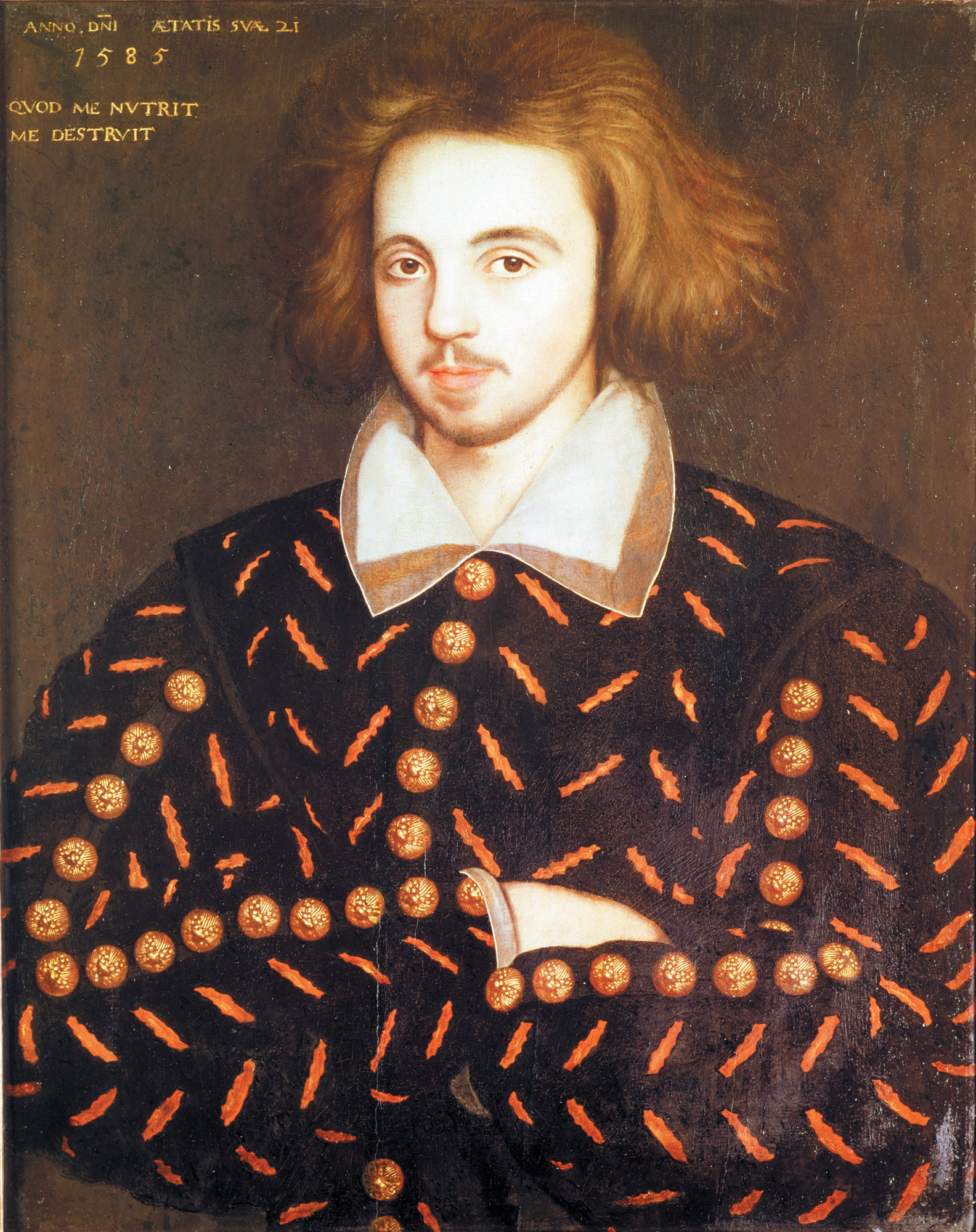
- Artist: Unknown
- Year: 1585
- Medium: Panel painting
- Subject: Unknown man, perhaps Christopher Marlowe
- Dimensions: 61 cm × 46 cm (24 in × 18 in)
- Location: Corpus Christi College; Cambridge
- Owner: Corpus Christi College

The putative Marlowe portrait is an unsigned portrait on wooden panel, dated 1585, which was discovered in 1952 or 1953 at Corpus Christi College, Cambridge. It has been proposed that the portrait depicts the English playwright Christopher Marlowe (1564–1593), though several scholars have suggested that this is unlikely.

== Discovery ==
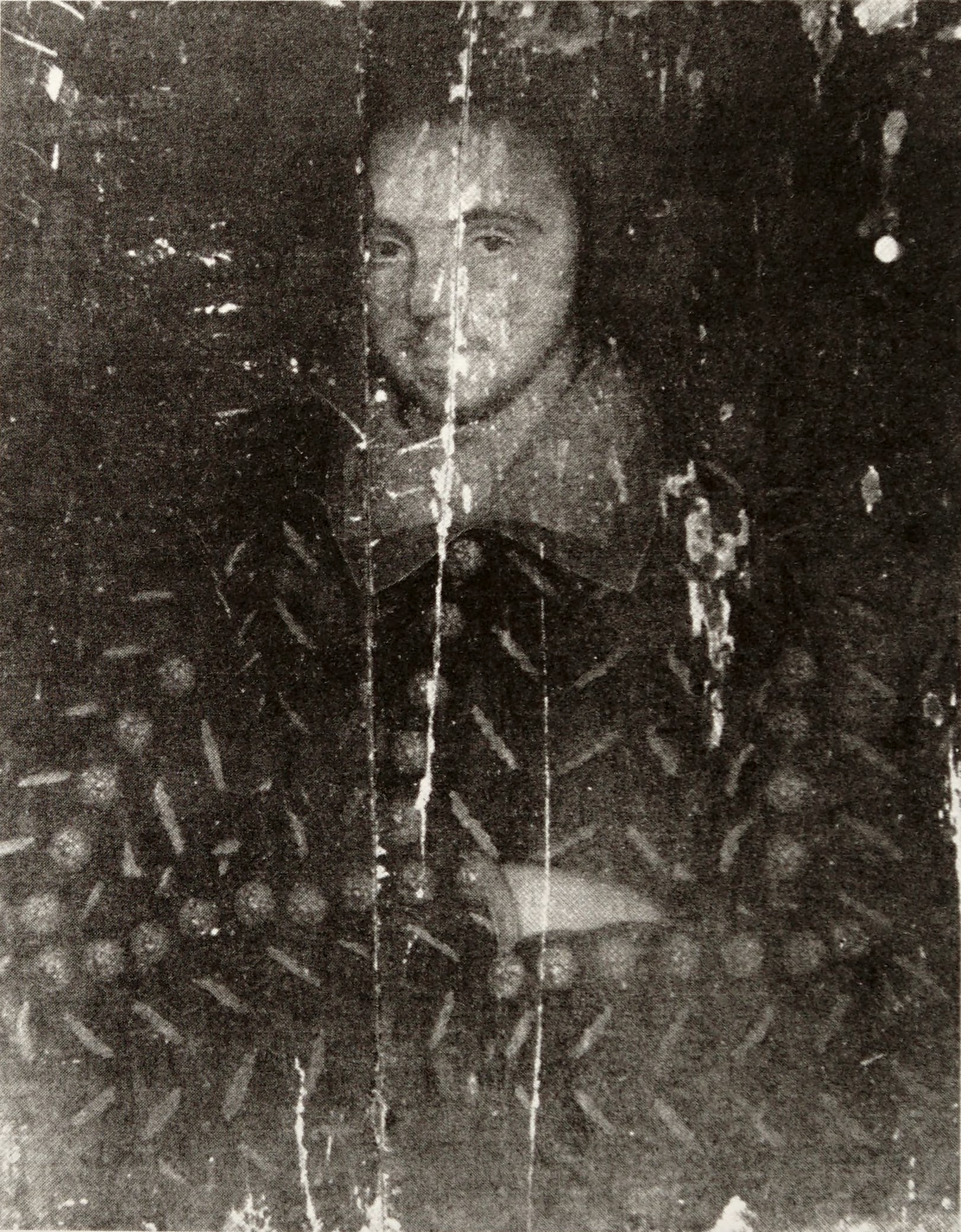
1953 photograph of the portrait before restoration

The painting was discovered in Corpus Christi College, Cambridge, in 1952 or 1953. Contradictory accounts of its discovery exist.

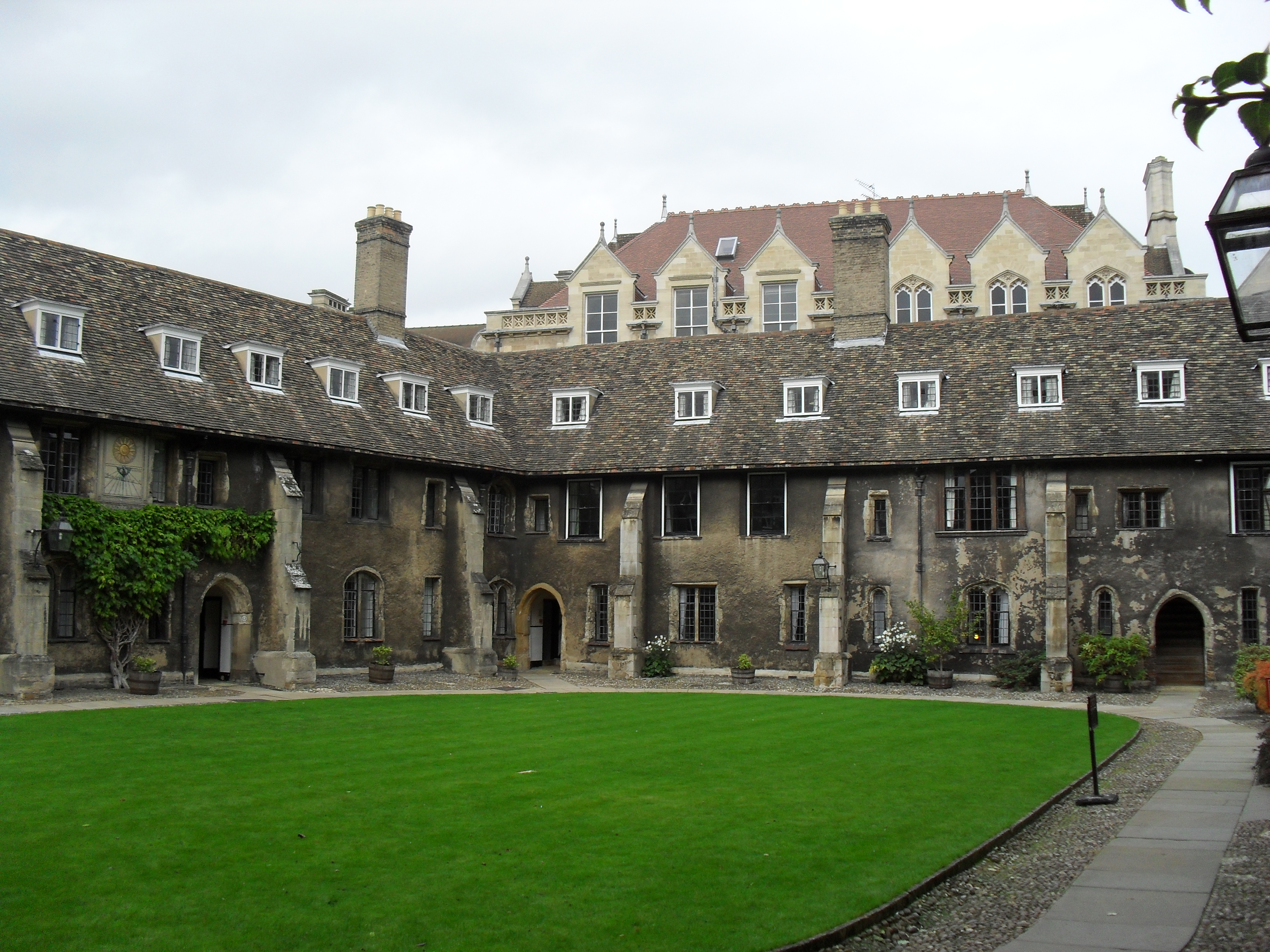
The Old Court of Corpus Christi College, Cambridge

One account dates the discovery of the portrait to late 1952, during major renovations to the college's Old Court which destroyed many ancient interiors. The wood panels had been used to support a gas heater installed in a student's room, above the room that had been assigned to Marlowe 370 years earlier. When a new heater was installed, the panels were discarded and put in a skip. The room's occupant, Peter Hall, recovered them for reuse, but noticed the dirty and badly damaged portrait and took the pieces to the college librarian.

A conflicting account states that the portrait was discovered in 1953, during renovations of the college master's lodge. A passing student, Peter Wimbush, noticed two pieces of wood amongst a pile of builder's rubble that had laid in the rain for several days, which proved to be the two parts of the portrait.

The portrait's history from its 1585 creation to its 20th century rediscovery is unknown. It is not listed in Robert Masters' 1790 catalogue of Cambridge University's paintings, nor in an 1884 inventory of paintings held by Corpus Christi College. The wood is badly split and has nail holes, suggesting that the panels had been put to various mundane uses over the years.

== Description ==
The portrait measures 24 by 18 inches (61 by 46 cm) and is painted on wood panels, made from Baltic oak imported from Poland or Lithuania. It depicts a young man, with long hair and a light beard, with his arms folded. He is expensively dressed in a dark doublet, possibly velvet, with rows of golden buttons. The doublet has a zig-zag pattern made by cuts in the cloth, exposing the orange lining.

The upper left hand corner of the portrait contains the date anno dn̅i 1585, together with the age of the sitter expressed by the Latin text ætatis suæ 21, meaning of his own age 21.

Below this is a Latin motto, Quod me nutrit me destruit, in English That which nourishes me destroys me. This wording has not been found in other texts, but it reflects a common Elizabethan sentiment. Author Charles Nicholl suggests that it is a version of Quod me alit me extinguit (That which feeds me extinguishes me), an Elizabethan motto which appears in the poet Samuel Daniel's 1585 work The Worthy Tract of Paulus Jovius, and later in William Shakespeare's Pericles, Prince of Tyre, c. 1607, and his Sonnet 73, 1609.

The portrait has similarities to the 1588 "Grafton portrait", sometimes suggested to depict Shakespeare. According to academic Germaine Greer, the sitters are the same person.

== Identification with Marlowe ==
The first to suggest a connection between the portrait and Christopher Marlowe was John Patrick Tuer Bury (son of Robert Gregg Bury), the college librarian and university lecturer in Modern History, who saw it soon after its discovery. Marlowe finished his BA at Corpus Christi in 1584 and began his MA studies there, and it was suggested, based on his baptism date of February 1564, that he would have been aged 21 in 1585.

Bury consulted with Bruce Dickins, chair of Anglo-Saxon, G K Adams of the National Portrait Gallery, John Bakeless, an American biographer of Marlowe, Frederick S. Boas, professor of English Literature and former president of the Elizabethan Literature Society and Rosemary Freeman, reader at Birkbeck College. The portrait was confirmed to be an Elizabethan work. In March 1953, it was decided to commission the painting's restoration by the London firm of W. Holder and Son. The firm no longer exists, and there is no known record of what their restoration involved.

Some sources credit Calvin Hoffman, a prominent proponent of the Marlovian theory of Shakespeare authorship, with the idea that the portrait depicted Marlowe, although he only proposed this in 1955.

The identification of the sitter remains uncertain. No other portrait of Marlowe is known to exist. The portrait could be of another student, though of the 27 wooden portraits the college keeps as of 2014, only 3 are known college members, all masters. Apart from "Marlowe", a further 4 of the 27 are unidentified. Alternatively, the portrait could be of a non-student as the man is not wearing the clothing prescribed for scholars – an ankle-length, dull-coloured gown – and has long hair, while scholars were required to wear their hair short; although it is known that many students at the time broke these regulations, including wearing silk and velvet.

Scholars Oliver Rackham and Peter Roberts have suggested that the age on the painting does not match Marlowe's age. They argue that ætatis suæ 21 means "in his 21st year", i.e. aged 20; which, combined with Marlowe's baptism date of February 1563 in the old style dates used at the time, would require the sitter to be at least a year younger than Marlowe.

Some suggest Marlowe would not have afforded to commission such a portrait as he was supported by a scholarship; although there is some indirect evidence that in 1584 Marlowe began receiving a significant additional income from an unknown source. It has also been suggested it would be unlikely for the College to commission a portrait of an ordinary student – especially as Marlowe was an undistinguished scholar, coming 199 out of 241 students in his BA – and that it is unlikely the college would have displayed a portrait of a student violating the university's own dress regulations.

== Recent history ==
In the years since its discovery, the portrait has become firmly associated with Marlowe, and it is often used to depict him. According to Nicholl, a general need to put a face on a famous name has worked in favour of the painting being accepted as a depiction of Marlowe. As of 2014, the portrait hangs in the Old Combination Room (a dining room) at Corpus Christi College, with no label identifying the sitter or artist.

Actress Angelina Jolie has the painting's motto tattooed on her lower stomach. Pro-anorexia websites have also used the motto.

== See also ==
- Portraits of Shakespeare
- Portrait of Anne Hathaway
