= Maria Hayward =

English historian of costume

Maria Hayward FRHistS FSA
- Occupations: Historian and academic
- Title: Professor of Early Modern History

Academic background
- Education: Winchester School of Art; London School of Economics
- Thesis: The Possessions of Henry VIII: A Study of Inventories (1997)

Academic work
- Discipline: History
- Sub-discipline: Early modern Britain; History of clothing and textiles; Economic history
- Institutions: Winchester School of Art; University of Southampton

Maria Hayward FRHistS FSA is an English historian of costume and early modern Britain.

She is Professor of Early Modern History at the University of Southampton and has published a number of works on the courts of Tudor and Stuart monarchs.

== Academic career ==
Hayward earned a bachelor's degree in history before completing a postgraduate diploma in textile conservation at Hampton Court Palace's Textile Conservation Centre, housed in the Winchester School of Art. She then moved into work as a conservator before completing a PhD at the London School of Economics in 1997. In 1999 she began working at the Textile Conservation Centre, serving as its head of studies and research from 2000 to 2008, and in 2008 joined the University of Southampton. She has served as the head of the history department at the university since 2022.

Hayward served on the editorial board of the journal Studies in Conservation from 2004 to 2009 and as assistant editor of Costume from 1999 to 2008. She has also served as associate director and then director of the AHRC Research Centre for Textile Conservation and Textile Studies. She has previously written for History Today.

== Honours and awards ==
Hayward was elected a fellow of the Society of Antiquaries of London in 2004 and of the Royal Historical Society in 2021.

== Selected publications ==
- The Material World of a Restoration Queen Consort: The Privy Purse Accounts of Catherine of Branzaga (Lincoln Record Society, 2024)
- A Revolution in Colour: Natural Dyes and Dress in Europe, c.1400-1800 (Bloomsbury, 2024; ed. with Giorgio Riello and Ulinka Rublack)
- Stuart Style: Monarchy, Dress and the Scottish Male Elite, (Yale University Press, 2020).
- "'We should dress us fairly for our end': The Significance of the Clothing Worn at Elite Executions in England in the Long Sixteenth Century", History, 101: (345), (April 2016). doi:10.1111/1468-229X.12229
- The First Book of Fashion: The Book of Clothes of Matthaeus and Veit Konrad Schwarz of Augsburg (Bloomsbury, 2015; with Ulinka Rublack and Jenny Tiramani)
- "Rich Pickings: Henry VIII's use of confiscation", Thomas Betteridge and Suzannah Lipscomb, Henry VIII and the Court: Art, Politics and Performance (Ashgate, 2013).
- The Great Wardrobe Accounts of Henry VII and Henry VIII, (London Record Society, 2012).
- Rich Apparel: Clothing and the Law Henry VIII's England, (Ashgate, 2009).
- Dress at the Court of King Henry VIII (Maney, 2007).
- "Gift Giving at the Court of Henry VIII", The Antiquaries Journal, 85 (2005), pp. 125–75. doi:10.1017/S0003581500074382
- The 1542 Inventory of Whitehall: the palace and its keeper, vols 1 & 2 (Society of Antiquaries of London, 2004).
