= Sanders portrait =

Reputed portrait of William Shakespeare

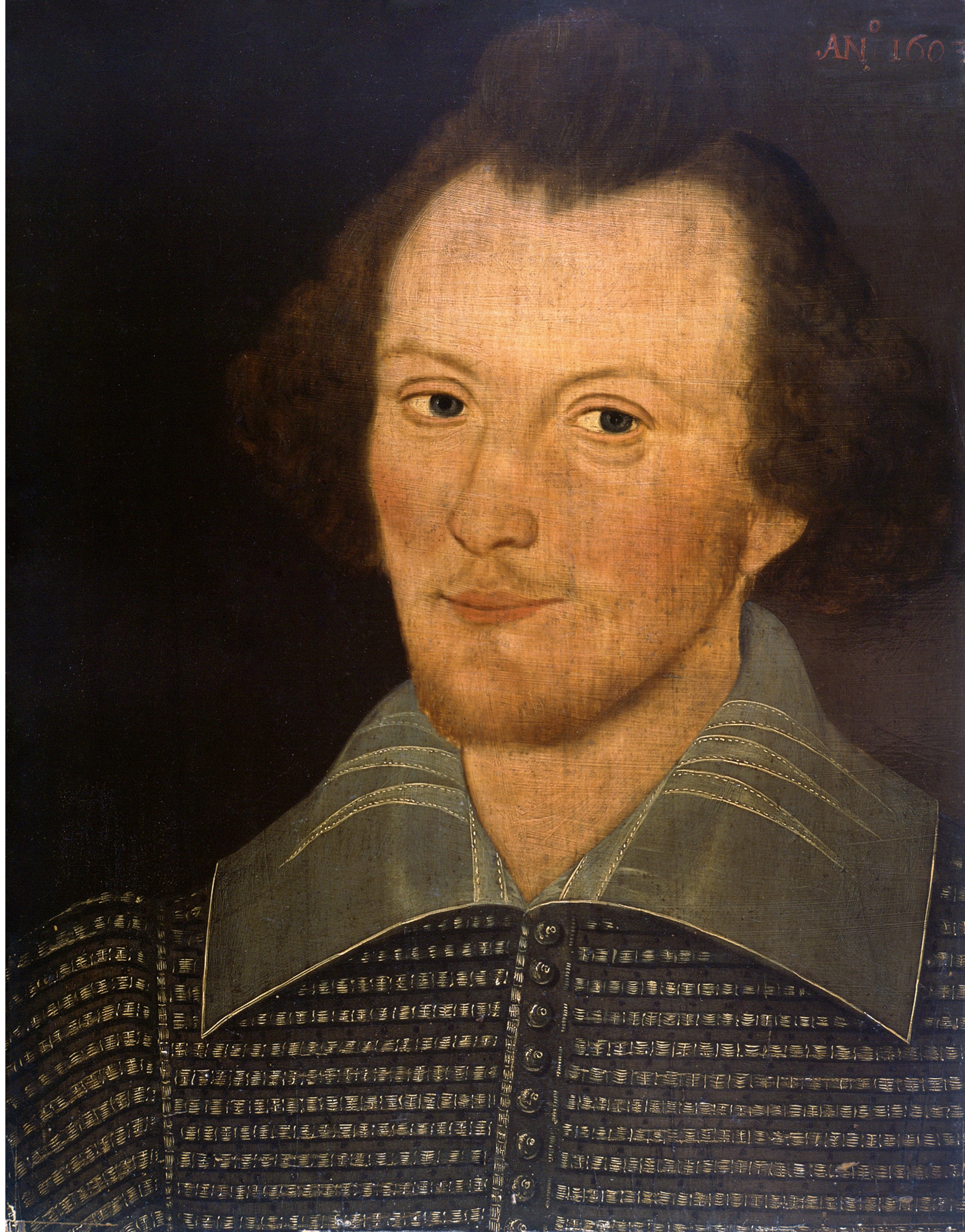
- Year: 1603
- Type: Oil on oak wood panel
- Dimensions: 42 cm × 33 cm (15 1/2 in × 13 in)
- Location: Private ownership, Ottawa, ON

The Sanders portrait is claimed to be an image made of William Shakespeare in his lifetime. It is named for the man claimed to have originally owned (and perhaps painted) the portrait, John Sanders, whose descendants claim that the family has owned the portrait for over 400 years. It features a middle-aged man wearing a black doublet with silver ornamentation. It also has a label affixed to the back which reads:

Shakspere [sic]
Born April 23=1564
Died April 23-1616
Aged 52
This Likeness taken 1603
Age at that time 39 y^{s}

This label was transcribed in 1909 by Marion Henry Spielmann; today, the original text is not legible.

The portrait's authenticity as a true likeness of Shakespeare is not widely accepted. Critics assert that the individual portrayed does not closely resemble Shakespeare as depicted in the only two indisputable portraits of him: the Droeshout portrait and the memorial statue at his gravesite. The painting's provenance also relies on circumstantial evidence: while the Sanders family can trace their lineage to the vicinity of Shakespeare, the portrait only enters the historical record in 1909 with the family claiming it was held in secret for 400 years. Despite this, many individuals and entities have (at least passively) accepted the portrait as an authentic depiction of Shakespeare.

== Controversy ==
The controversy over the veracity of the Sanders portrait concerns three subjects: the provenance of the artifact, verification of its antiquity, and concerns regarding the content and context of the portrait. While the results of scientific testing of the portrait have been consistent with the claimed age, its provenance is less conclusive. Finally, even if the painting could be determined with certainty to have been created at the time of Shakespeare, and passed down the generations through the Sanders family, critics dispute whether the figure depicted truly is William Shakespeare, on the basis of issues with the content of the painting itself, and the text of the label.

=== Provenance ===
Its ownership can be verified back as far as 1909 when M. H. Spielmann studied the painting – at which time it was in the possession of T. Hale Sanders, who had taken ownership of it from his uncle through his father. Thomas (T.) Hale Sanders is the great grandfather of Lloyd Sullivan. In early 1919 Agnes Hales Sanders, grandmother of Lloyd Sullivan, travelled from Montreal to London to reclaim the Sanders Portrait. Since then it has been held in Montreal and Ottawa.

The portrait's existence was made public in May 2001 by Lloyd Sullivan. Since then, it has been shown in art galleries including the National Portrait Gallery in London.

=== Scientific testing ===
In all, thirteen tests have been done on the Sanders Portrait. These tests include tree-ring dating, which dated the wood panel to no earlier than 1597; Radiographic testing, which concluded there was not any other painting beneath the Sanders Portrait and that it had not been retouched; paint sample testing, the results of which were consistent with the claimed age of the painting, but cannot conclusively assert its age; the label, the ink on it, and the glue used to affix it were also tested and determined to be consistent with the claimed age. Radiocarbon dating of the label placed the material's creation between 1475 and 1640.

=== Content of the painting ===
The primary content-based criticism of the Sanders portrait is the lack of resemblance to confirmed images of Shakespeare. The two images of Shakespeare known to have been produced or approved by people who knew Shakespeare in life, the Droeshout engraving and his funeral monument, are in strong agreement as to his appearance. If the claimed date of the Sanders portrait is correct, it was produced only 13 years before his death, during which time Shakespeare would have needed to experience a major change in appearance. Several other portraits throughout history have been said to depict Shakespeare, such claims later being seriously disputed or outright disproven (the most well-known examples being the Ashbourne and Cobbe portraits).

The label has been the source of much controversy. Many claim that the wording on the label "This Likeness taken" is not consistent with 17th century practices. Others argue that the birthdate of Shakespeare (23 April) was an 18th century mistake indicative of later forgery, though defenders of the portrait's authenticity argue that the portrait is proof that birthdate is correct, and the strongest evidence for its authenticity. (Note: Shakespeare's date of birth was completely unknown until his baptismal records were discovered in 1769, though this only records his date of baptism, which can expected to be a small number of days after his birth. Subsequent scholarship figured his date of birth as 23 April, in large part because of the serendipity that that is also the date of his death. If the 23 April birthdate is correct, it lends credence to the painting's legitimacy. If 23 April is not correct, it indicates the painting was made after 1769.)

Lloyd DeWitt, curator of European Art at the Art Gallery of Ontario, examined the portrait's style and oak panels and determined them consistent with Elizabethan English portraits.

Period clothing expert Jenny Tiramani inspected the clothing and hairstyles of the sitter and compared it with known biographical information of William Shakespeare and his life in 1603. Tiramani concluded:

- Shakespeare's elevation to a member of the King's Men in 1603 was likely the reason for having the portraiture painted.
- This elevation in status also allowed Shakespeare access to the silver thread and other elements of his dress that would have, the year earlier, been restricted from him by sumptuary laws.
- The undercoat is similar to those worn in other early 17th century theatre portraits.
- The hairstyle is consistent with those styles worn by young courtiers in the 17th century.

== Ownership ==
After Lloyd Sullivan's death in 2019, guardianship of the portrait passed to his nephew James Hale-Sanders.
