= Gerard Soest =

17th-century Dutch painter

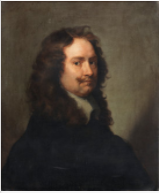
Self-portrait, 1660

Gerard Soest (c. 1600 – 11 February 1681), also known as Gerald Soest, was a portrait painter who was active in England during the late 17th century. He is most famous for his portraits of William Shakespeare and Samuel Butler, but painted many members of the English gentry.

Soest was traditionally thought to have come from Soest in Westphalia, but was probably from Soest, Netherlands, being Dutch by birth and training. He seems to have been in England by the late 1640s, and his paintings at this time show the influence of William Dobson. His earliest known work is dated 1646.

He had a moderately successful career, but was never fashionable and never managed to get commissions from courtiers and royalty.

Soest's portrait of Shakespeare was owned by Thomas Wright of Covent Garden in 1725 when it was engraved by John Simon. It was painted by Soest at least 30 years after Shakespeare's death. George Vertue states that it was based on a man who resembled Shakespeare, while the pose and costume suggest the influence of the Chandos portrait.

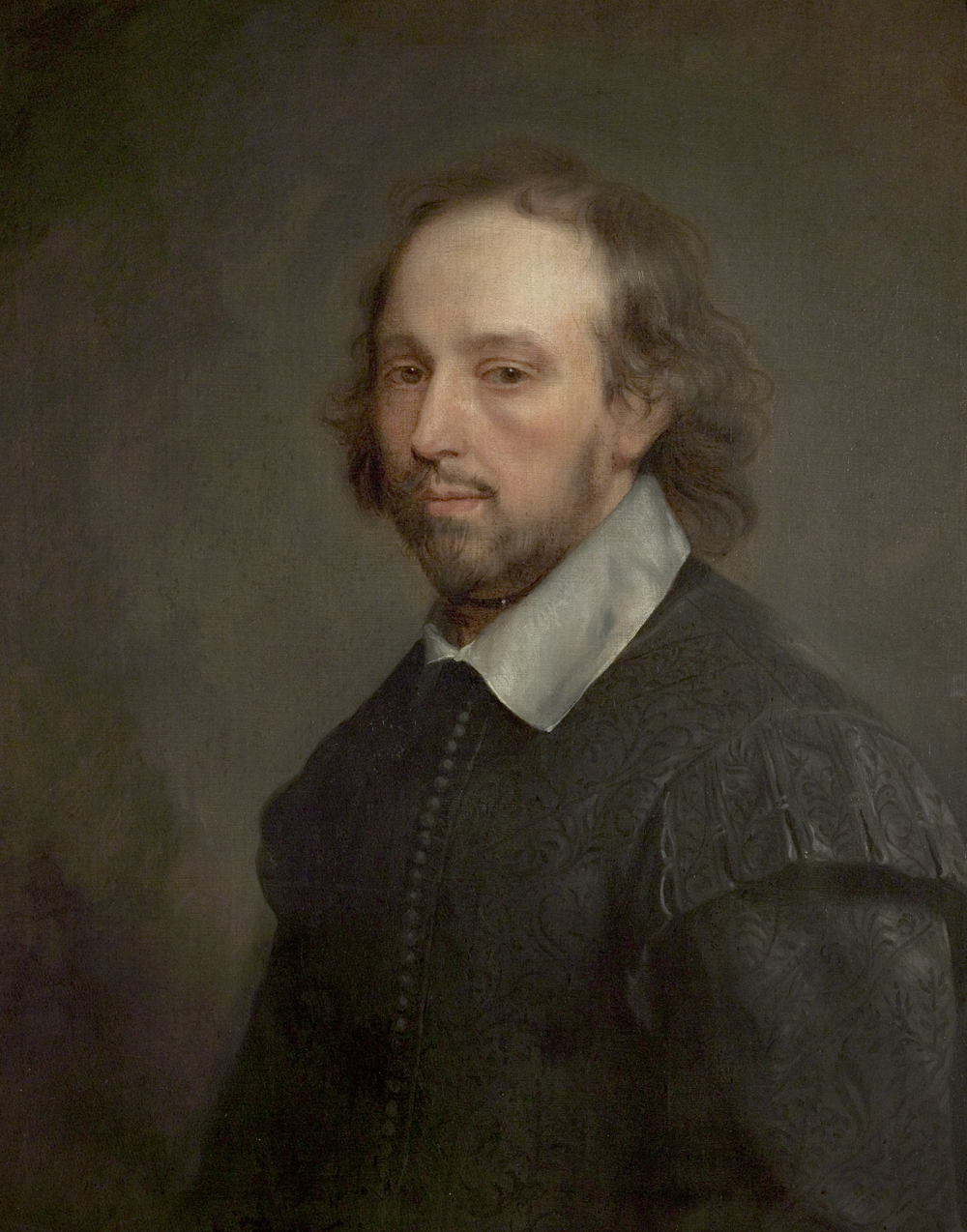
Soest's portrait of Shakespeare
