= Cobbe portrait =

Early Jacobean painting argued to be a life portrait of William Shakespeare

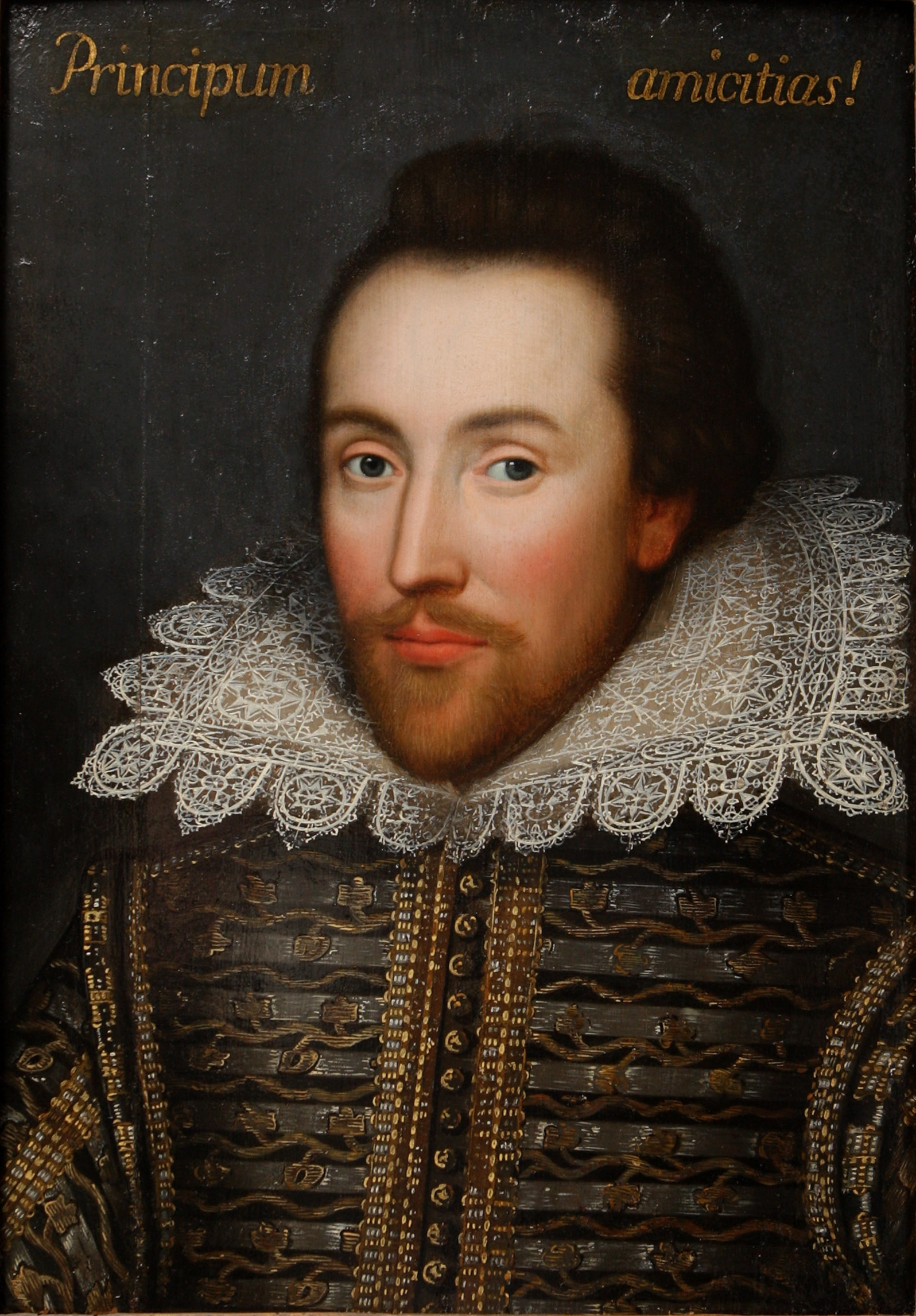
The Cobbe portrait

The Cobbe portrait is an early Jacobean panel painting of a gentleman which has been argued to be a life portrait of William Shakespeare. It is displayed at Hatchlands Park in Surrey, a National Trust property, and the portrait is so-called because of its ownership by Charles Cobbe, Church of Ireland (Anglican) Archbishop of Dublin (1686–1765). There are numerous early copies of the painting, most of which were once identified as Shakespeare.

The Cobbe original was only identified in the collection of the Anglo-Irish Cobbe family in 2006, and had until then been completely unknown to the world. Evidence uncovered by researchers at the Shakespeare Birthplace Trust led to the claim, presented in March 2009, that the portrait is of William Shakespeare and painted from life. Many scholars dismiss this theory and have provided evidence to identify the portrait as one of Sir Thomas Overbury.

The portrait has been the centrepiece of two exhibitions dedicated to it: Shakespeare Found: a Life Portrait at the Shakespeare Birthplace Trust, Stratford-upon-Avon, from April–October 2009 and The Changing Face of William Shakespeare at the Morgan Library and Museum, New York, from February–May 2011. An illustrated catalogue provides details of the painting and its provenance.

== Support ==
Support for the identification as a portrait of Shakespeare is drawn from several strands of evidence:

1. The portrait descended in the Cobbe family together with a portrait of Shakespeare's patron, Henry Wriothesley, 3rd Earl of Southampton – and they were inherited by Archbishop Cobbe through his cousin's wife, Southampton's great-granddaughter, who inherited Wriothesley heirlooms.
2. At least five early copies of the Cobbe portrait have long traditions as representing Shakespeare: in the case of one of them, the 'Janssen' portrait in the Folger Shakespeare Library (Washington, D.C.), the tradition is claimed to date to within living memory of Shakespeare. This is one of the longest Shakespeare traditions attaching to any oil portrait. Furthermore, the existence of so many early copies indicates that the sitter was a man of fame.
3. The Cobbe portrait is inscribed with the words Principum amicitias!, meaning 'the alliances of princes!', a quotation from Horace in an ode addressed to a man who was, among other things, a playwright (see below).
4. The Cobbe portrait, and even more so the Janssen copy, bears a compositional similarity with the Droeshout engraving published in the First Folio of 1623. The original or copy may have been a source for the engraving.
5. Scientific testing has shown that the portrait is painted on a panel of English oak sometime after 1595; the form of the collar suggests a painting date of around 1610.
6. Both the Cobbe portrait and the Janssen copy received alterations, in particular to the hairline. In the Cobbe original, this alteration made the sitter look younger, and the copies of the Cobbe received this younger hairline. The later state of the Janssen was significantly aged compared with either version of the Cobbe, suggesting that the alteration was made either late in the sitter's life or after his death. A second "bald" copy of the Cobbe, originally owned by the Marquess of Dorchester, also exists.

The identification has received support from Shakespeare scholars Stanley Wells, Henry Woudhuysen, Jay L. Halio, Stuart Sillars, and Gregory Doran, chief associate director of the Royal Shakespeare Company, and art historians Alastair Laing, curator of paintings and sculpture at the National Trust, and Paul Joannides, professor of Art History at Cambridge.

Supporters of the Shakespeare identification reject the arguments for Overbury. Research using tracings by Rupert Featherstone at the Hamilton Kerr Institute, University of Cambridge, has led him to conclude that the Cobbe portrait and the only documented portrait of Overbury in the Bodleian Library, Oxford, depict two different sitters.

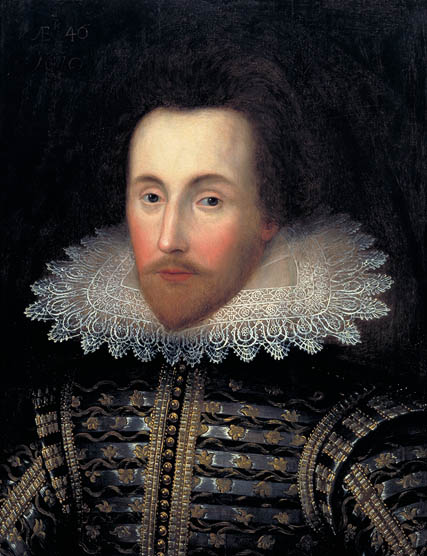
The Janssen portrait after 1988 restoration

Since the publicity surrounding it, the portrait has appeared on the covers of several books, and even inspired the Chinese author Zhang Yiyi to have a series of cosmetic surgeries to have his face transformed into that of Shakespeare.

== Criticism ==
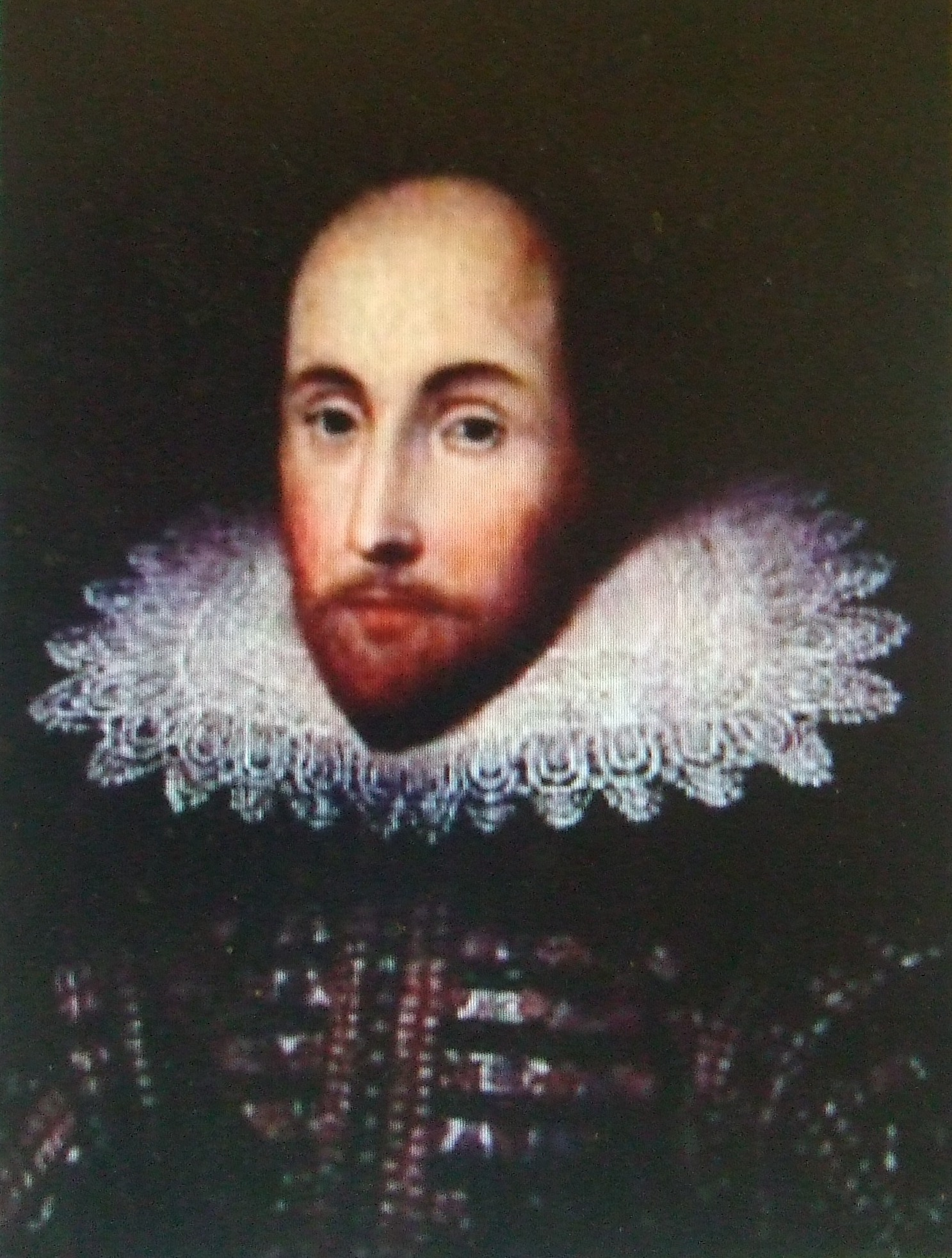
The altered balding hairline in the "original" Janssen portrait, as it appeared when purchased by the Folger Shakespeare Library in the early 1930s

The claims about the portrait have also met with considerable scepticism from other Shakespeareans and art experts, including Shakespeare scholar and general editor of the Arden Shakespeare David Scott Kastan, who has questioned the portrait's provenance, and Tarnya Cooper, curator of 16th-century portraits at the National Portrait Gallery, who believes that both the Cobbe and Janssen portraits represent Sir Thomas Overbury. Other scholars have noted numerous differences between the Cobbe portrait and the authentic but posthumous Droeshout engraving that appeared in the First Folio of Shakespeare's works.

== History ==
The subject of the portrait was unidentified for centuries after passing into the ownership of the Cobbe family some time in the early 18th century.

In 2006, Alec Cobbe viewed the "Janssen portrait", so-called because it was once attributed to the artist Cornelis Janssen. It belongs to Washington's Folger Shakespeare Library, and was on exhibition in the National Portrait Gallery in London; it bore a striking resemblance to the one owned by his family. The Janssen painting had long been claimed to be Shakespeare. However, the state of the painting that Cobbe viewed was not the one that showed the greatest resemblance to the standard engraved Droeshout image of Shakespeare with a high, balding forehead. The removal of overpainting in 1988 had, in fact, revealed an earlier state with a much younger hairline. Shakespeare's age and date had also been added at some later time.

In the exhibition catalogue the "Janssen portrait" was tentatively identified as a depiction of the courtier, poet and essayist Thomas Overbury. This suggestion dates back to an earlier exhibition in 1964, before the cleaning. Nevertheless, the catalogue asserted that this was simply a guess.

Cobbe sought advice from the Shakespeare Birthplace Trust. Over a three-year period, a research project headed by Stanley Wells and Alastair Laing, performed a number of authentication studies on the portrait. Wells and Laing concluded that sufficient circumstantial evidence exists to announce the project's findings. They also suggested that the "Janssen portrait" was a copy of the Cobbe portrait. As is detailed in the catalogue of the 2009 exhibition "Shakespeare Found", several other early copies of the Cobbe portrait have been located and no less than three of them have independent traditions as portraits of Shakespeare.

In 2006, the National Portrait Gallery concluded that the so-called Chandos portrait was then the only existing portrait painted during the life of Shakespeare.

== Proposal of Stanley Wells and collaborators ==
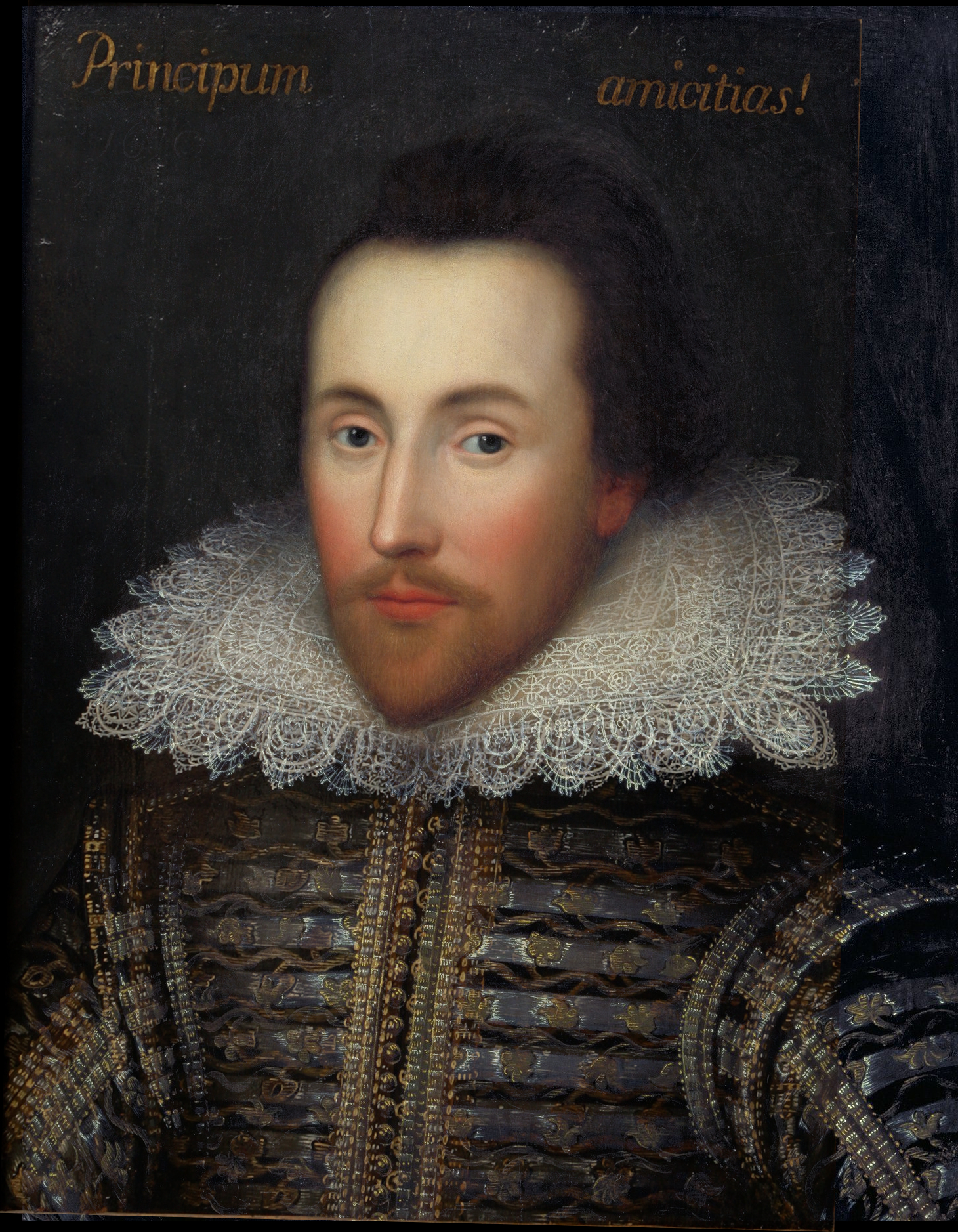
Overlay of the Cobbe and Janssen portraits

After extensive infra-red and x-ray test analysis including growth-ring testing of the panel on which the portrait is painted, scientists have estimated that the panel is from around 1610. According to Stanley Wells the portrait has been in the possession of the Cobbe family since the early 18th century and is most likely a portrait of Shakespeare. It, or more likely a copy such as the Janssen, is possibly the source of Martin Droeshout's familiar engraving on the title page of the Shakespeare First Folio (1623). The portrait is thought to have been commissioned by Shakespeare's patron, Henry Wriothesley, 3rd Earl of Southampton. Wells said:

The evidence that it represents Shakespeare and that it was done from life, though it is circumstantial, is in my view overwhelming. I feel in little doubt that this is a portrait of Shakespeare, done from life and commissioned by the Earl of Southampton.

In deciding between the Cobbe original and one of its copies as a source for the engraving, Wells draws attention to a greater similarity in the shape of the figure between the engraving and the Janssen copy. Although many details of the doublet and collar are eliminated in the engraving, the angle and length of the arms, the shape of the fabric at the shoulders, and the length of the torso, all show a greater resemblance in the Janssen.

== Controversy ==
In a review of the exhibition catalogue edited by Wells, Robert Bearman writes: "It is strongly argued that there is a striking resemblance between the newly discovered portrait (or, rather, a copy) and the Droeshout engraving of Shakespeare, and that the painting might itself have been used by Droeshout." Bearman also expresses scepticism about the link with Shakespeare's patron Wriothesley.

Other experts are even more sceptical, and suggest that even the circumstantial evidence is weak. Shakespeare scholar David Scott Kastan also took the view that there were reasons to question the Cobbe portrait's provenance – whether it was in fact once owned by the Earl of Southampton or commissioned by him, as the Trust representatives believe – and to doubt whether the richly dressed man in the portrait was Shakespeare. "If I had to bet, I would say it's not Shakespeare", Kastan said. But even if it were, he said, the traditions of Elizabethan portraiture meant that it would be unwise to conclude that Shakespeare actually looked like the figure depicted in the portrait. "It might be a portrait of Shakespeare, but not a likeness, because the convention of portraiture at the time was often to idealise the subject", he said.

Sir Roy Strong, former director of the Victoria and Albert Museum and the National Portrait Gallery, and a leading scholar of Elizabethan and Jacobean portraiture, has called Wells's claims "codswallop". Dr Tarnya Cooper, curator of 16th century portraits at the National Portrait Gallery, also voiced scepticism. While acknowledging that the Janssen portrait and the Cobbe portrait are versions of the same image, she believes it likely that both portraits represent Sir Thomas Overbury. Of Wells's identification of the sitter as Shakespeare, she said, "I respect Wells's scholarship enormously, but portraiture is a very different area, and this doesn't add up."

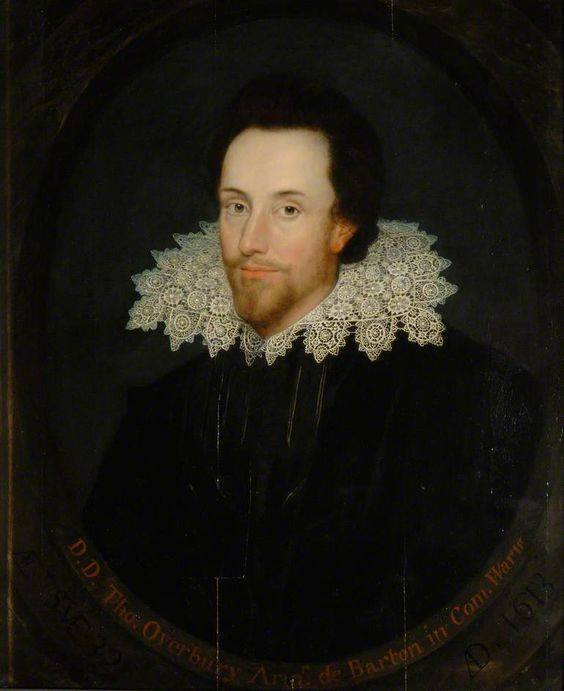
This portrait of Sir Thomas Overbury, bequeathed to the Bodleian Library in 1740, has been suggested as the source of the smaller Cobbe or Janssen portraits.

Writing in The Times Literary Supplement Shakespeare biographer Katherine Duncan-Jones also favours the identification of the subject as Overbury:

An authentic portrait of Sir Thomas Overbury (1581–1613) was bequeathed to the Bodleian Library in Oxford in 1740. This picture bears a startling resemblance to the "Cobbe" painting (and its companions). Features such as a distinctive bushy hairline, and a slightly malformed left ear that may once have borne the weight of a jewelled earring, appear identical. Even the man's beautifully intricate lace collar, though not identical in pattern, shares overall design with "Cobbe", having square rather than rounded corners.

Hildegard Hammerschmidt-Hummel wrote that the Cobbe portrait was not an authentic likeness of Shakespeare. She noted the opinion of Eberhard J. Nikitsch, a specialist in inscriptions, who said that the script of the painting's inscription was not commonly used in early 17th-century portraits, and that it must have been added later.

Wells and his colleagues have responded to the criticisms, arguing that David Piper's original 1964 identification of the Janssen as Overbury was based on the misreading of an inventory. They also assert that the hairline was altered before 1630, because another copy of that date already showed the balding forehead. They counter Duncan-Jones's argument that the costume is too aristocratic for Shakespeare by comparing it to that worn by Shakespeare's colleague and collaborator John Fletcher in a portrait of the period.

== Latin text ==
The portrait includes the Latin legend Principum amicitias! ("The Friendships of Princes!") painted above the sitter's head. This is speculated to be a quotation from Horace's Odes, book 2, ode 1 (below), where the words are addressed to Asinius Pollio, who, among other things, was a poet and playwright. In Horace's context they form part of a sentence meaning "beware the alliances of princes." The word for "beware" (or danger[ous]) is not, however present in the inscription, so it literally translates as "friendships of Princes". The fact that the word "friendships" appears in the accusative case in the inscription (rather than in the nominative, as one would expect if it were to stand alone), underscores the fact that the inscription was meant to allude to the passage in Horace 2.1.

| Latin | English translation |
|---|---|
| Motum ex Metello consule ciuicum bellique causas et uitia et modos ludumque Fortunae grauisque principum amicitias et arma nondum expiatis uncta cruoribus, periculosae plenum opus aleae, tractas et incedis per ignis suppositos cineri doloso. | You are writing on the civil disturbances during the consulship of Metellus, the causes of war, and the mistakes, and the methods, and the play of Fortune, and the destructive friendships of rulers, and weapons stained with blood still unatoned for. It is a work filled with dangerous chance, and you are walking over fires that smoulder with deceitful ashes. |

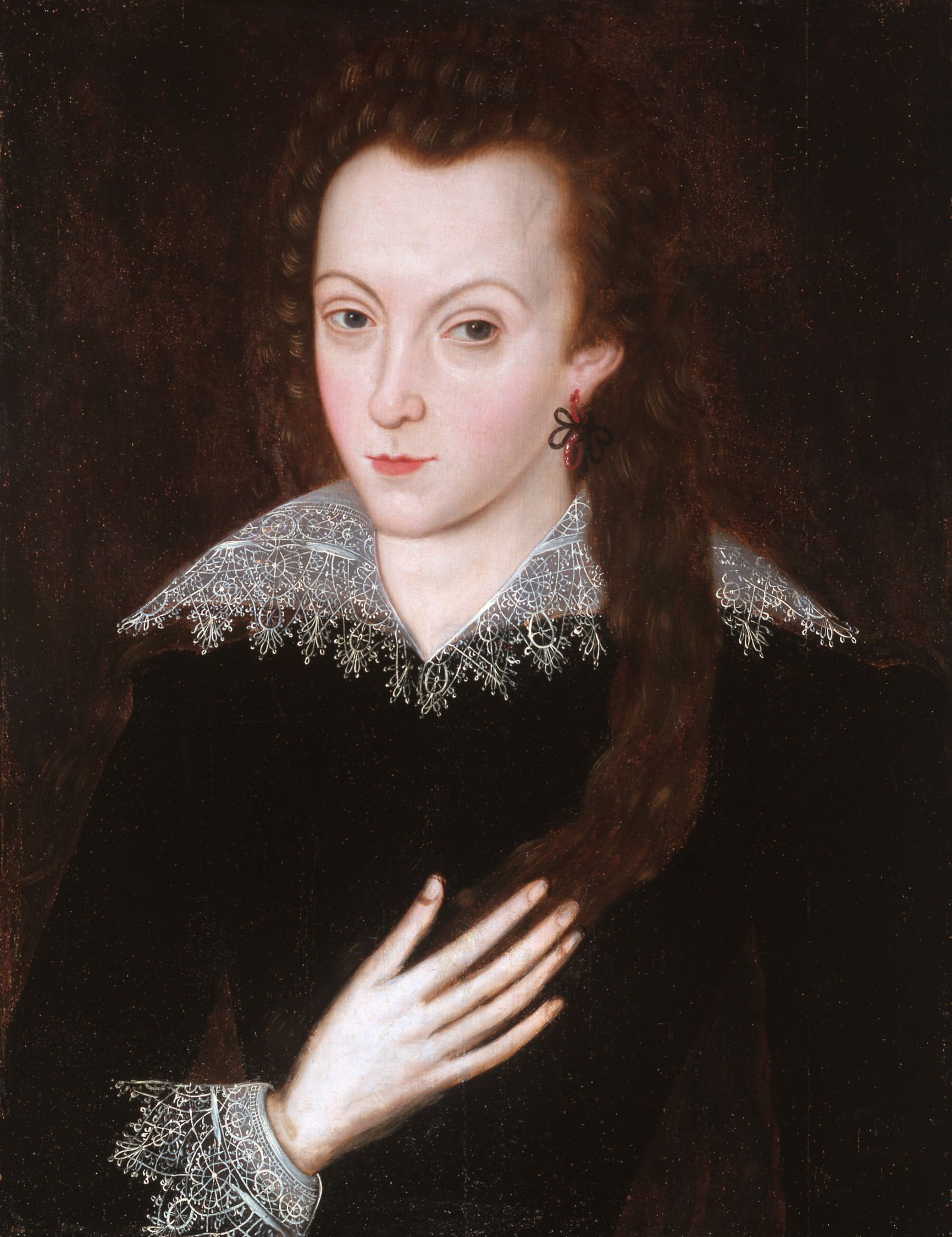
The Cobbe portrait of Southampton

== Cobbe portrait of Southampton ==
The claims regarding this portrait follow from research into another portrait in the Cobbe collection, also displayed at Hatchlands Park, which came to public attention in 2002 when the painting, which for three centuries had been identified as a portrait of a woman, "Lady Norton", was confidently identified as a portrait of a young man. The coincidence of distinctive features, the extraordinarily long hair, the high forehead, the long nose terminating in a bulb and the slender upper lip with known portraits of Henry Wriothesley, 3rd Earl of Southampton, led to the conviction that it depicted Shakespeare's patron the 3rd Earl of Southampton himself, whose great-granddaughter was Lady Elizabeth Norton. The portrait is the earliest extant oil portrait of the androgynous-looking youthful Earl to survive and shows him at the time that Shakespeare dedicated his long poems Venus and Adonis (1593) and The Rape of Lucrece (1594) to him. The Earl has often been suggested as the "Fair Youth" who is the love object in some of Shakespeare's sonnets. Alastair Laing of the National Trust wrote at the time that, "I am very happy indeed about the identification. Given the connection to Shakespeare and his sonnets, it is a very, very exciting discovery."

== See also ==
- Newbridge Estate
