= Droeshout portrait =

Portrait of Shakespeare by Martin Droeshout

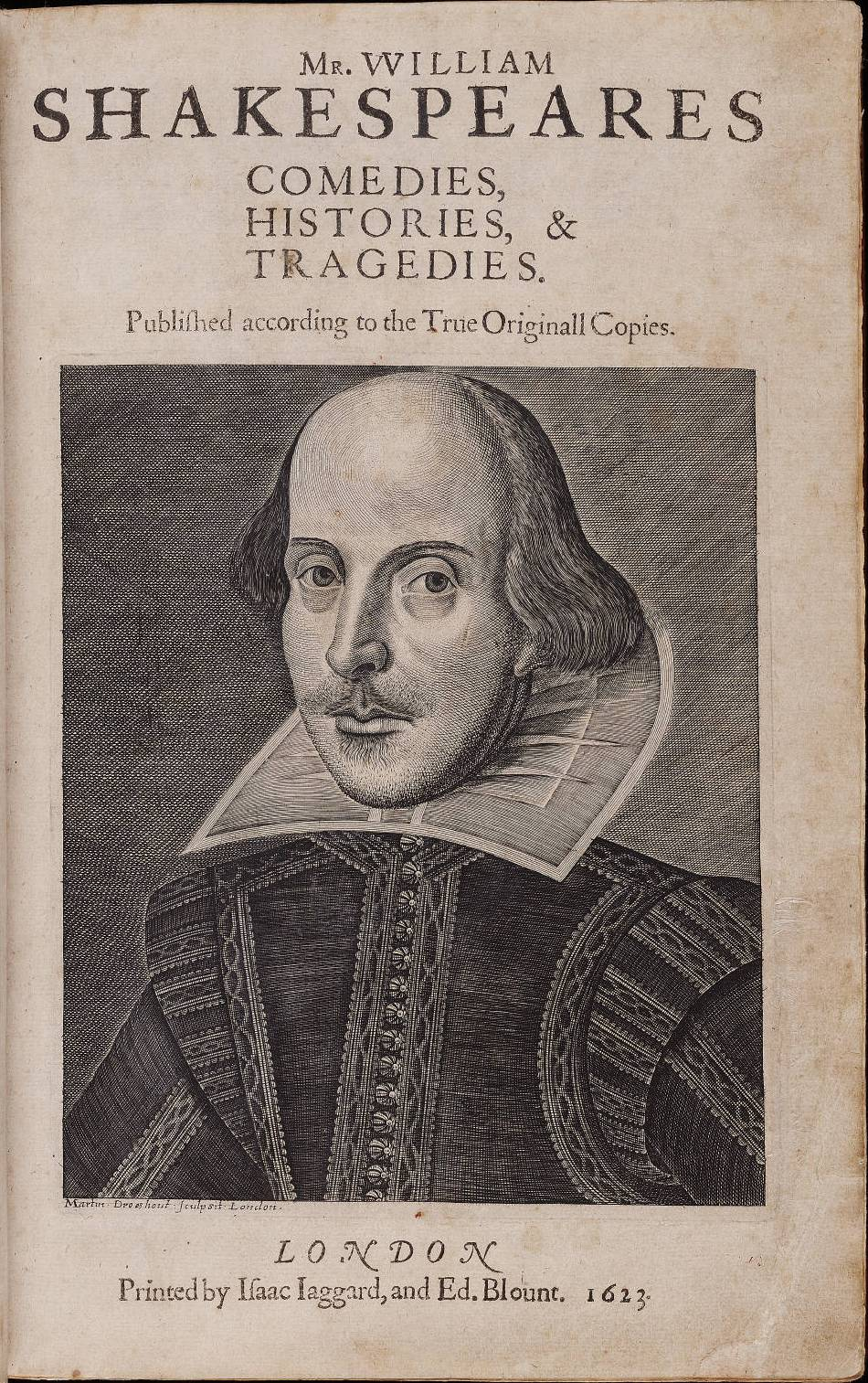
- The Droeshout portrait of William Shakespeare as it appears on the title page of the first folio. This is the final, or second state, of the engraving.
- Artist: Martin Droeshout
- Year: 1623
- Type: Engraving
- Dimensions: 34 cm × 22.5 cm (13 in × 8.9 in)

The Droeshout portrait or Droeshout engraving is a portrait of William Shakespeare engraved by Martin Droeshout as the frontispiece for the title page of the First Folio collection of Shakespeare's plays, published in 1623. It is one of only two works of art definitively identifiable as a depiction of the poet; the other is the statue erected as his funeral monument in Shakespeare's home town of Stratford-upon-Avon. Both are posthumous.

While its role as a portrait frontispiece is typical of publications from the era, the exact circumstances surrounding the making of the engraving are unknown. It is uncertain which of two "Martin Droeshouts" created the engraving and it is not known to what extent the features were copied from an existing painting or drawing. Critics have generally been unimpressed by it as a work of art, although the engraving has had a few defenders, and exponents of the Shakespeare authorship question have claimed to find coded messages within it.

== States ==
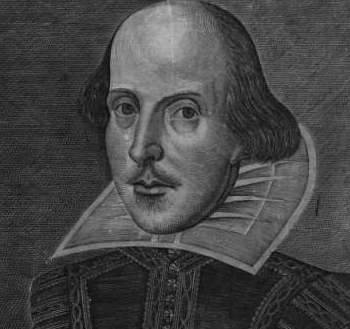
The first state of the engraving, with less heavy modelling and lacking highlights, for example in the chin and the hair at the right.

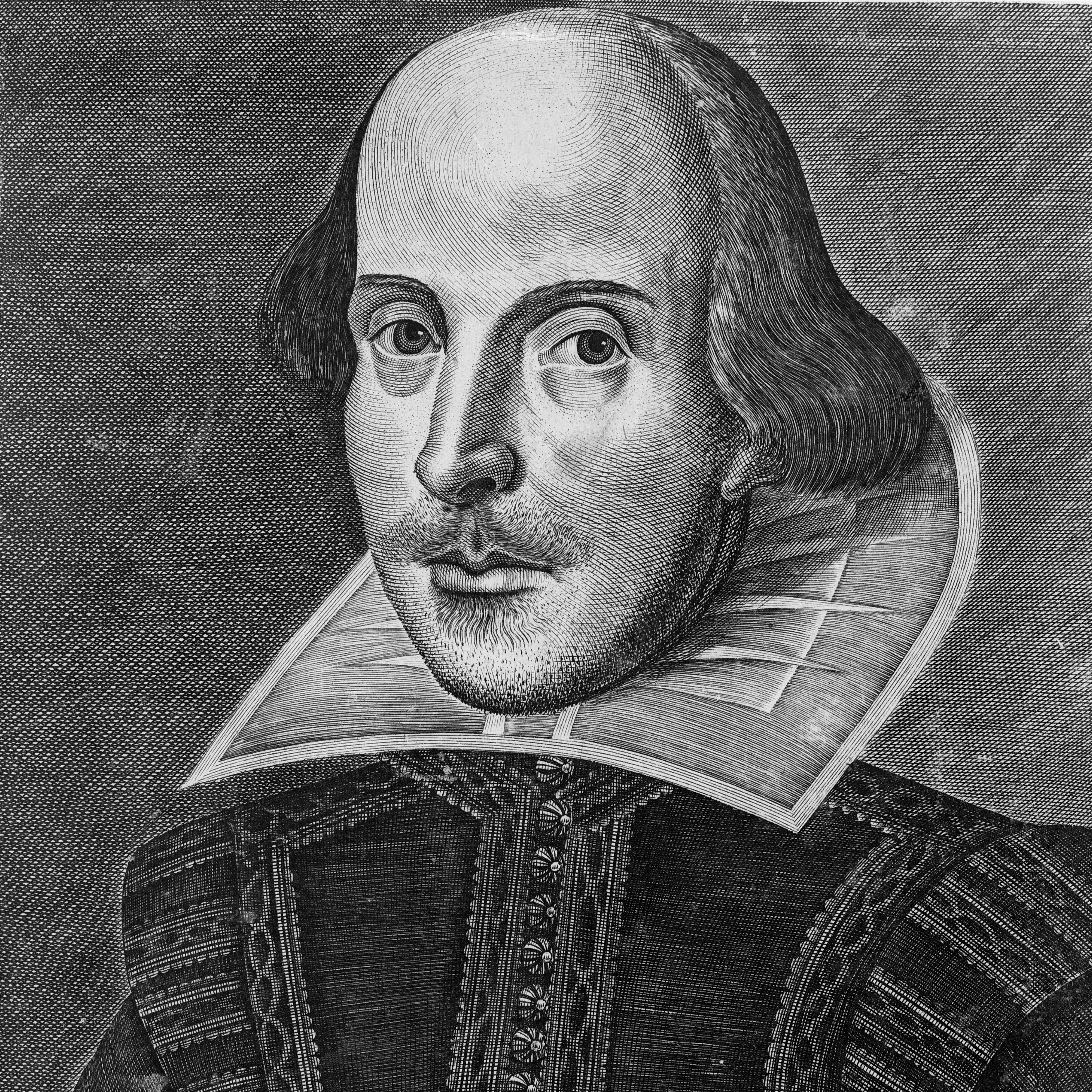
The second, final state of the engraving.

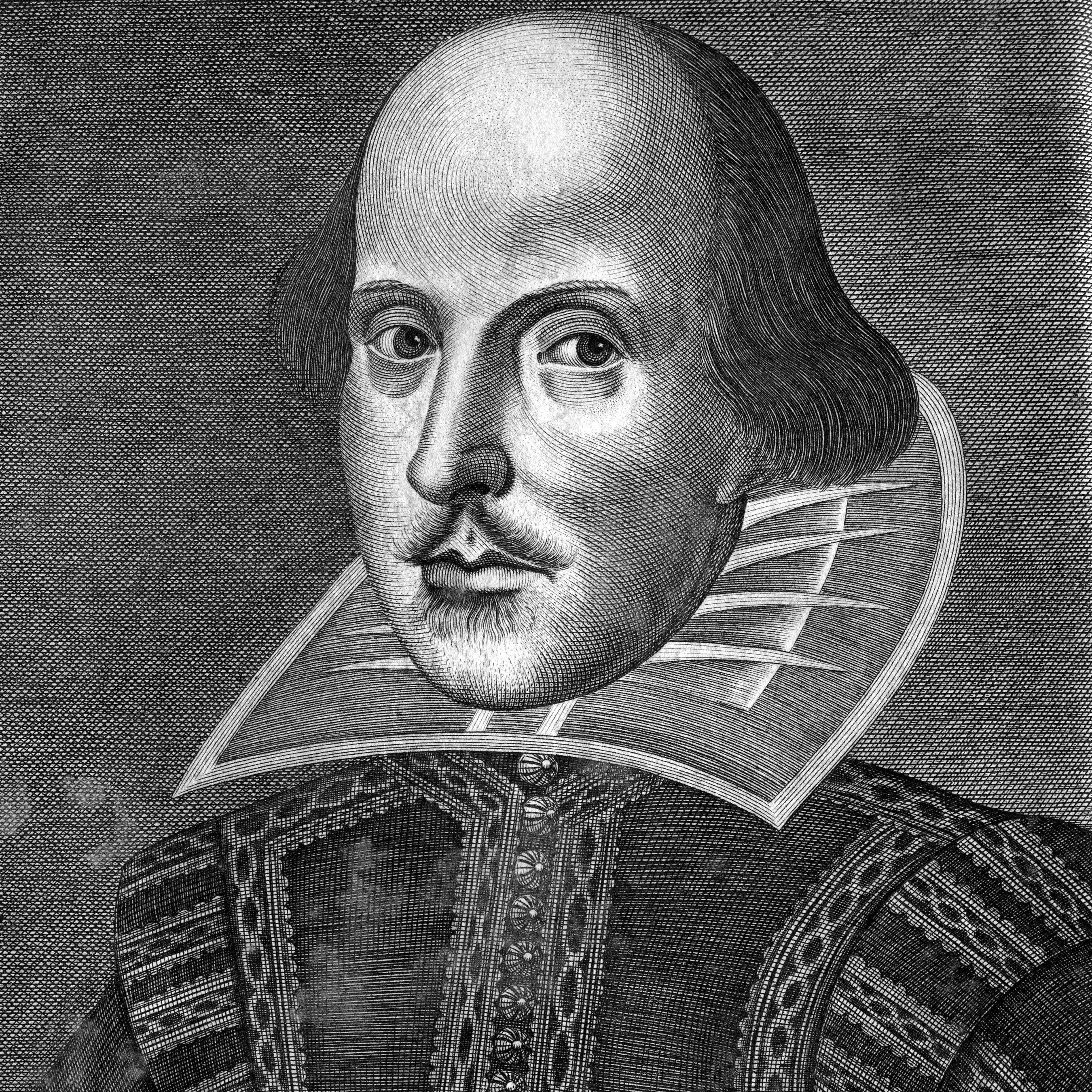
Engraving after Martin Droeshout from the Johnson/Steevens 1787 2nd edition of the plays.

The portrait exists in two "states", or distinct versions of the image, printed from the same plate by Droeshout himself. Examples of the first state are very rare, existing in only four copies. These were probably test printings, created so that the engraver could see whether some alterations needed to be made. The overwhelming majority of surviving copies of the First Folio use the second state, which has heavier shadows and other minor differences, notably in the jawline and the moustache.

Later copies of the second state, with minor retouching, were also printed from the plate by Thomas Cotes in 1632, for Robert Allot's Second Folio, a new edition of the collected plays. It was also reused in later folios, although by then the plate was beginning to wear out and was heavily re-engraved. The original plate was still being used up to the Fourth Folio of 1685 (heavily retouched) and then disappears. Already in 1640 William Marshall had copied and adapted the design on a new plate for John Benson's edition of Shakespeare's sonnets. All subsequent engraved reprintings of the portrait were made by later engravers copying the original printed image.

== Authorship ==
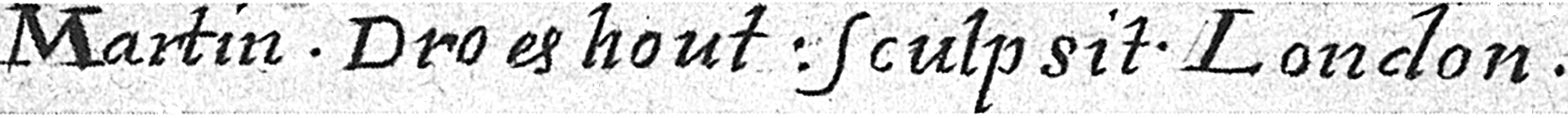
Droushout's signature, under the image at the left

The engraving is signed under the image at the left, "Martin Droeshout. sculpsit. London". The Droeshouts were a family of artists from the Netherlands, who had moved to Britain. Because there were two members of the family named Martin there has been some dispute about which of the two created the engraving. Most sources state that the engraver was Martin Droeshout the Younger (1601 – after 1639), the son of Michael Droeshout, an immigrant from Brussels. Except for his date of birth and parentage, very little is known about Martin the Younger, but since his father was an engraver, it has been assumed that Martin followed in his father's footsteps, and that he made the engraving of Shakespeare. As he was 15 when Shakespeare died, he may never have seen him and it has been assumed that he worked from an existing image.

Research by Mary Edmond into the Droeshout family revealed new information about Martin Droeshout the Elder (c. 1560s – 1642), who was the uncle of the younger Martin. Edmond shows that Droeshout the Elder was a member of the Painter-Stainer's Company. Edmond writes,

It seems perverse to attribute the Shakespeare engraving to the obscure and unsuitably young Martin Droeshout, born in 1601, as is customary, when there is a quite well-documented artist of the same name to hand, in the person of his uncle".

In 1991 Christiaan Schuckman discovered a set of signed plates in Madrid, Spain, that can be attributed to the engraver of the First Folio portrait. These plates bear Droeshout's signature and are stylistically similar to his portrait of Shakespeare. (They include a portrait of the priest and writer Francisco de la Peña that has a striking resemblance to the English poet). On the evidence of these plates, which were made between 1635 and 1639, Schuckman attributed the portrait of Shakespeare to the younger Martin and suggested that the engraver had converted to Catholicism and emigrated to Spain in 1635, where he continued to work.

More recently, June Schlueter has found evidence that Martin the Elder was in London when the engraver of the First Folio portrait was known to be in Madrid. Although she began her archival research hoping to prove Edmond's assertion that the elder Martin was the Shakespeare engraver, Schlueter concludes that the newly discovered evidence actually supports the younger.

The traditional attribution to Droeshout the younger can also be supported on stylistic grounds. A drawing known to be by Droeshout the elder appears to show artistic skill superior to the work of his nephew, and the clumsy features of the depiction of Shakespeare's body resemble other prints by Droeshout the Younger. The attribution to the younger artist is provisionally accepted by the National Portrait Gallery.

== Significance ==
The engraving is praised by Shakespeare's friend Ben Jonson in his poem To the Reader printed alongside it, in which he says that it is a good likeness of the poet. He writes that "the graver had a strife / With nature to outdo the life" and that he has "hit his face" accurately. He adds that the engraver could not represent Shakespeare's "wit", for which the viewer will have to read the book.

Because of this testimony to the accuracy of the portrait, commentators have used the Droeshout print as a standard by which to judge other portraits alleged to depict Shakespeare. As the 19th-century artist and writer Abraham Wivell put it,

It is, as I may say, the key to unlock and detect almost all the impositions that have, at various times, arrested so much of public attention. It is a witness that can refute all false evidence, and will satisfy every discerner, how to appreciate, how to convict.

In a similar vein, art historian Tarnya Cooper, in 2006, writes that "it is the only portrait that definitely provides us with a reasonable idea of Shakespeare's appearance".

=== Source image ===
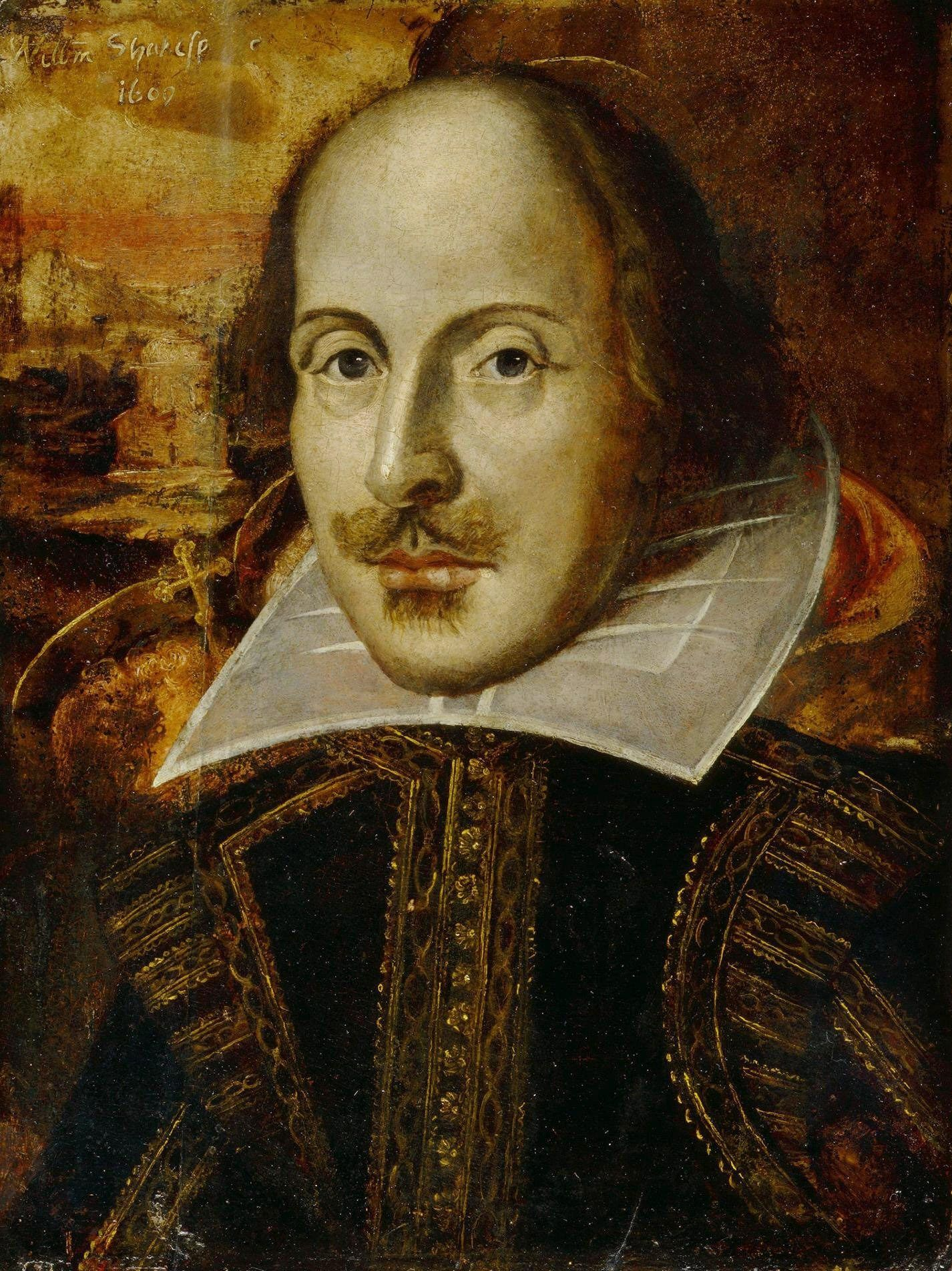
The fake "Flower portrait" of Shakespeare

In addition to its use as a template to judge the authenticity of other images, scholars have also speculated about the original source used by Droeshout himself. The 19th-century scholar George Scharf argued on the basis of the inconsistencies in the lights and shadows that the original image would have been "either a limning or a crayon drawing". These typically used outlines rather than chiaroscuro modelling. He deduced that Droeshout had inexpertly attempted to add modelling shadows. Mary Edmond points out that Droeshout the Elder seems to have had an association with Marcus Gheeraerts the portraitist, and notes that there is evidence that a portrait of Shakespeare by Gheeraerts may have once existed. She surmises that Droeshout's engraving may have been derived from this lost portrait. Cooper argues that the poor drawing and modelling of the doublet and collar suggests that Droeshout was copying a lost drawing or painting that only depicted Shakespeare's head and shoulders. The body was added by the engraver himself, as was common practice.

In the 19th century a painting that came to be known as the Flower portrait was discovered, inscribed with the date 1609 and painted on an authentic 17th-century panel. It was initially widely accepted as the original work from which Droeshout had copied his engraving, but in 1905 the art scholar Marion Spielmann demonstrated that the portrait corresponded to the second state of Droeshout's print. Taking the view that if it were the source, the first state would be closest, he concluded that it was a copy from the print. In 2005 chemical analysis proved the portrait to be a 19th-century fake painted over an authentic 17th-century image.

== Critical evaluations ==
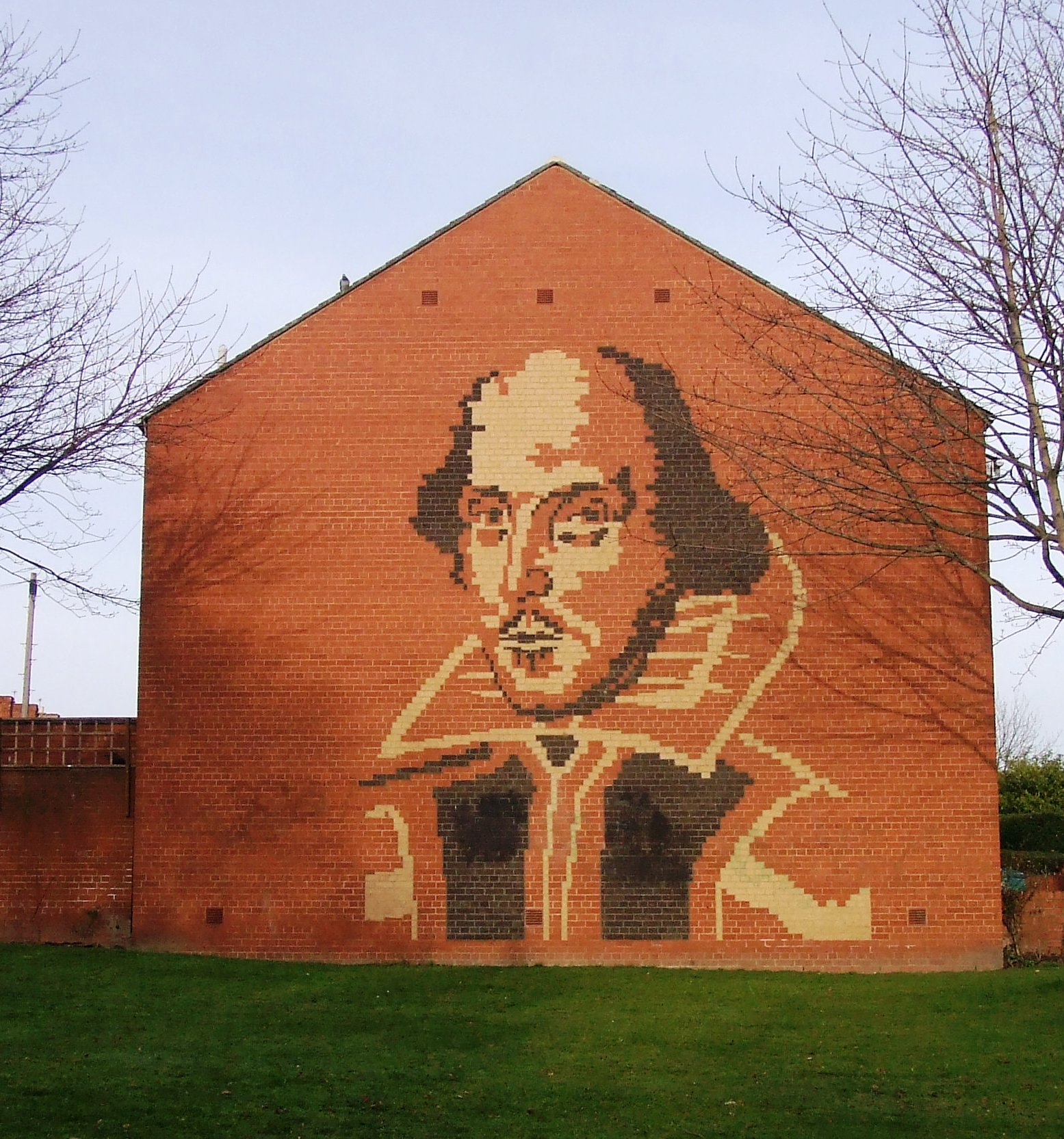
A stylised version of the Droeshout portrait in the brickwork of a house in Stratford Road, Heaton, Newcastle upon Tyne

The poor modelling and the clumsy relationship between the head and the body have led many critics to see the print as a poor representation of the poet. J. Dover Wilson called it a "pudding faced effigy". Sidney Lee wrote that "The face is long and the forehead high; the one ear which is visible is shapeless; the top of the head is bald, but the hair falls in abundance over the ears." Samuel Schoenbaum was equally dismissive:

In the Shakespeare engraving a huge head, placed against a starched ruff, surmounts an absurdly small tunic with oversized shoulder-wings ... Light comes from several directions simultaneously: it falls on the bulbous protuberance of forehead – that "horrible hydrocephalous development", as it has been called – creates an odd crescent under the right eye and (in the second state) illuminates the edge of the hair on the right side.

Northrop Frye said that the portrait makes Shakespeare "look like an idiot." Cooper notes that "the art of printmaking in England was underdeveloped and there were relatively few skilled engravers. Yet even by the less exacting standards observed in England, the Droeshout engraving is poorly proportioned." Benjamin Roland Lewis observes that "virtually all of Droeshout's work shows the same artistic defects. He was an engraver after the conventional manner, and not a creative artist."

Not all critics have been so harsh. The 19th-century writer James Boaden wrote that "to me the portrait exhibits an aspect of calm benevolence and tender thought, great comprehension and a kind of mixt feeling, as when melancholy yields to the suggestions of fancy". He added that his friend John Philip Kemble thought this "despised work" was more characteristic of Shakespeare than any other known portrait. More recently, Park Honan has written that "if the portrait lacks the 'sparkle' of a witty poet, it suggests the inwardness of a writer of great intelligence, an independent man who is not insensitive to the pain of others."

=== Conspiracy theories ===
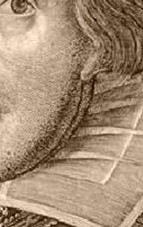
The double line created by the space between the shadow-line above the jaw and the jawline itself is claimed by some conspiracy theorists to suggest that Shakespeare's face is a mask.

Proponents of the Shakespeare authorship question, who assert that someone other than Shakespeare was the real author of the plays attributed to him, have claimed to find hidden signs in the portrait pointing to this supposed secret. Indeed, Dover Wilson suggested that the poor quality of the Droeshout and funeral effigy images are the underlying reason for "the campaign against 'the man from Stratford' and the attempts to dethrone him in favour of Lord Bacon, the Earl of Derby, the Earl of Oxford, or whatever coroneted pretender may be in vogue at the present moment." In 1911, William Stone Booth published a book claiming to demonstrate that the features of the engraving were "anatomically identical" to those of Francis Bacon, proving that he wrote the works. He achieved this by creating "combination images" from several portraits of Bacon and then superimposing them on the engraving. Using similar methods Charles Sidney Beauclerk subsequently concluded that the portrait depicted the Earl of Oxford. In 1995, Lillian Schwartz, using a computerised version of the same technique, argued that it was based on a portrait of Elizabeth I.

An alternative approach has been to claim that the portrait depicts William Shakespeare, but does so in a way designed to ridicule him by making him look ugly, or to suggest that he is a mask for a hidden author. The double line created by the gap between the modelling shadow and the jawline has been used to suggest that it is a mask, as has the shape of the doublet, which is claimed to represent both the back and front of the body. Thus Edwin Durning-Lawrence asserts that "there is no question – there can be no possible question – that in fact it is a cunningly drawn cryptographic picture, shewing two left arms and a mask ... Especially note that the ear is a mask ear and stands out curiously; note also how distinct the line shewing the edge of the mask appears."

None of these views are accepted by mainstream art historians. Lewis writes that these features are all characteristic of engravings of the era and that none are unusual. An engraving of John Davies of Hereford shares most of these quirks for example, including the uncertain placing of the head on the body and the "same awkward difference in design between the right and left shoulders".
