= Flower portrait =

Portrait of William Shakespeare

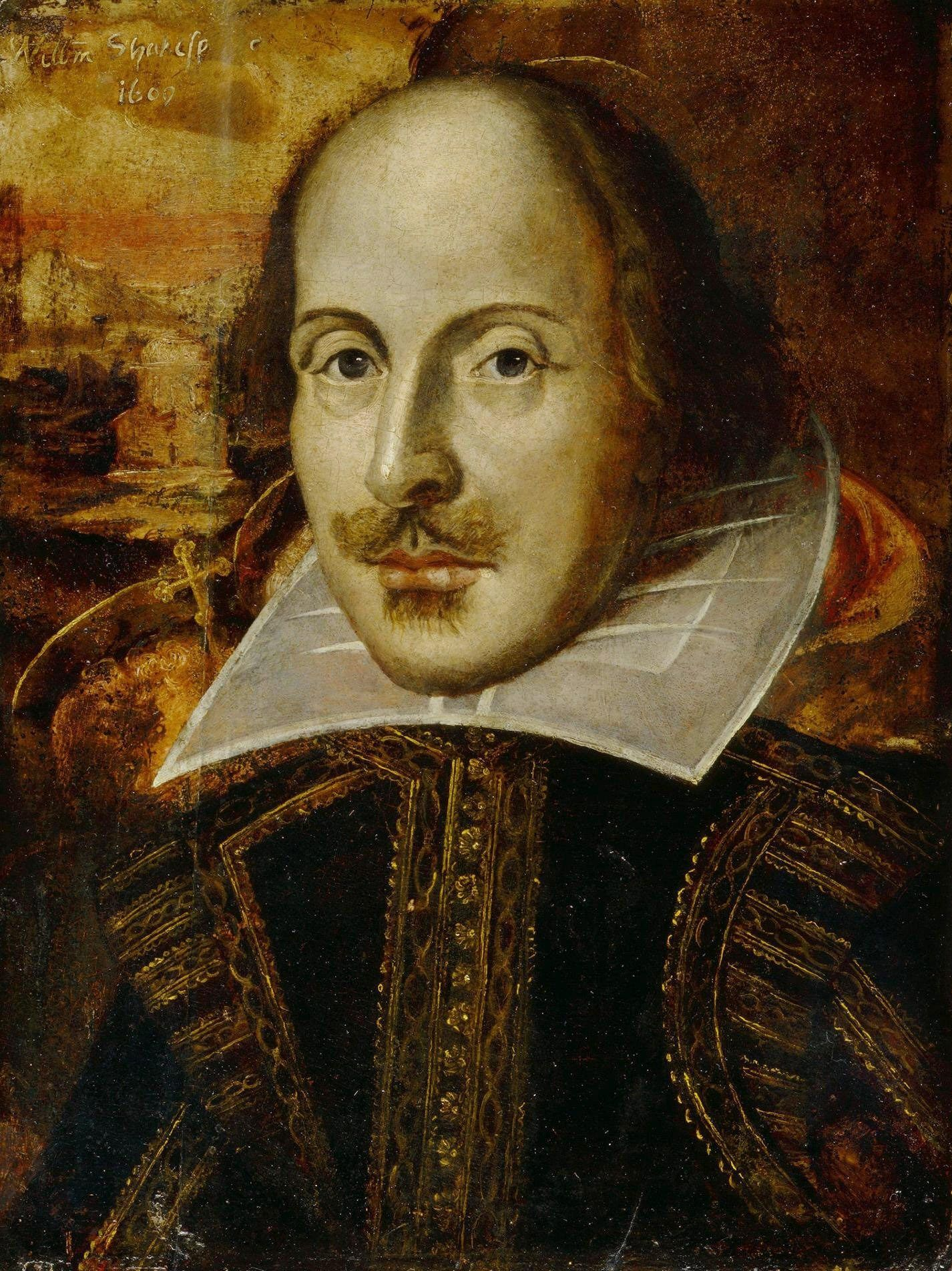
- Year: 19th century
- Location: Royal Shakespeare Company, United Kingdom

The Flower portrait is the name of one of the painted portraits of William Shakespeare. A 2005 investigation of the portrait led to the conclusion that it was a forged artwork painted in the 19th century.

The name originates with the painting's previous owners, the Flower family, who gave it to the Royal Shakespeare Company. The painting depicts Shakespeare gazing out of the picture and wearing a wide white collar. It has a signed date of 1609, but many art experts had been suspicious of its provenance before it was X-rayed in 2005.

The picture has been commonly used, for example, in the covers of Shakespeare's published plays. It is similar to, and most likely a copy of, the Droeshout engraving, which appeared in 1623 in the first folio publication of Shakespeare's plays.

== History ==
According to statements by Edgar Flower, whose family had owned the painting, it was acquired sometime around 1840 by a Mr H.C. Clements, whose widow sold it to a member of the Flower family. Mrs C. Flower donated it to the Shakespeare Memorial Trust in Stratford, and it was exhibited at its picture gallery there in 1892. A number of experts who studied it at the time accepted that it was an authentic 17th-century painting. It was exhibited as the original from which the Droeshout engraving had been copied. Sidney Lee, in his 1898 biography of Shakespeare, declared that "no other pictorial representation of the poet has equally serious claims to be treated as contemporary with himself". However, in 1904, the art critic Marion Spielmann undertook a detailed analysis in which he demonstrated that the painting resembled Droeshout's revised second-state print rather than the original print, concluding that if Droeshout had copied the painting, then the first version would be more directly imitative. He took the view that the painting was an early copy of the print.

Many historians accepted this argument, but the painting still had its defenders. In 1966, an X-ray revealed that the portrait was painted on top of a 16th-century painting that depicts a Madonna and child with John the Baptist. In 2000, Hildegard Hammerschmidt-Hummel reasserted claims to the painting's authenticity, publishing a detailed argument in 2006.

== 2004 study ==
In 2004, experts of the National Portrait Gallery in London investigated three portraits of Shakespeare in preparation for the gallery's 150th anniversary exhibition. On 21 April 2005, investigators announced that the painting was not contemporary with Shakespeare.

Most of the pigments on the painting were available in the 17th century, but the golden braid of the doublet was painted with chrome yellow, a pigment unavailable until about 1814. The particles of the chrome yellow are part of the normal layer of paint, meaning that it was not painted afterwards. Therefore, Tarnya Cooper, one of the curators of the Gallery, announced that the painting is a 19th-century forgery, dating from around 1818–1840.
