= Hatchlands Park =

Historic house museum in East Clandon, Surrey, England

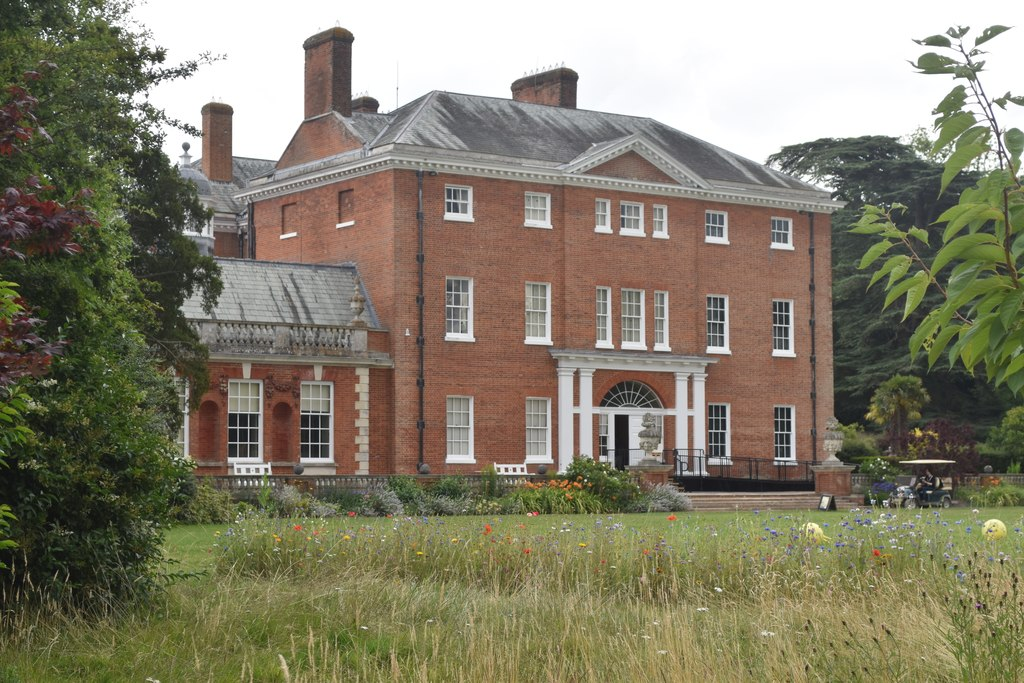
- The West Front at Hatchlands

- Location within Surrey
- 51°15′26″N 0°28′19″W
- Type: Country house
- Location: East Clandon, Surrey
- OS grid reference: TQ 06733 52009

History
- Built: 1750
- Built for: Edward Boscawen

Site notes
- Architect(s): Stiff Leadbetter; Robert Adam (interiors only)
- Owner: National Trust

Listed Building – Grade I
- Official name: Hatchlands
- Designated: 14 Jun 1967
- Reference no.: 1294970

National Register of Historic Parks and Gardens
- Official name: Hatchlands
- Designated: 27 July 2007
- Reference no.: 1001697

Hatchlands Park is a country house in East Clandon, Surrey, in the care of the National Trust. Unusually, the house is tenanted to the Cobbe family, whose collection furnishes it. Hatchlands is particularly known for housing the 55 keyboard instruments of the collector Alec Cobbe.

The house is set within an estate of 170 hectares (430 acres). It is located near Guildford along the A246 between East Clandon and West Horsley. Hatchlands Park has been a Grade I listed property since 1967. The gardens were Grade II listed in 2007.

== History ==
The park initially belonged to the Chertsey Abbey with the park being mentioned in the Domesday Book. In 1544, after the dissolution of the monasteries, it was granted by Henry VIII to Sir Anthony Browne and his wife, Lady Elizabeth Fitzgerald ('The Fair Geraldine' of Henry Howard). The first visual record of the park is shown on a John Seller map of 1693.

The park was purchased in 1750 by Admiral Edward Boscawen who landscaped the grounds; for the house he employed the architect Stiff Leadbetter, with Robert Adam designing some interiors. Edward Boscawen's widow, Fanny sold the estate in 1770 to the Sumner family of the East India Company; both father and son made further alterations to the property. The father, William Brightwell Sumner commissioned Benjamin Armitage to make alterations, and his son, George Holme Sumner asked Humphry Repton (1752–1818) to redesign the park and garden. Towards the end of the century, Joseph Bonomi the Elder was commissioned to alter several rooms and to impose a frontispiece on the west front.

In 1888, the Sumner family sold the estate to Stuart Rendel, later Lord Rendel. He had extensive changes made to the fabric of the house. Rendel was mainly his own architect but he also employed his nephew by marriage, Halsey Ricardo, and commissioned Reginald Blomfield to build the Music Room. Rendel coloured and gilded Robert Adam's ceilings, embellished the staircase with rococo decorations and switched the main entrance of the house to the east. Rendel also commissioned Gertrude Jekyll to design the gardens which contain a parterre. Lord Rendel's grandson, Harry Stuart Goodhart-Rendel, who was an architect and British Army officer, inherited the house in 1913. He passed the estate to the National Trust in 1945.

The house is open to the public, but closed on certain days of the week. However, the parkland is now open 363 days a year. There is a café and a shop. There is a cobbled courtyard.

== The interior ==
The house contains interiors by Robert Adam, decorated in a nautical style: anchors, cannon, dolphins and sea-nymphs are presided over by Neptune himself and run through the house, reflecting its first owner Edward Boscawen.

== Cobbe Collection ==
Hatchlands houses the 55 keyboard instruments of the Cobbe Collection, which is the largest collection of its kind in the world.

=== Instruments ===
Many of the instruments are associated with famous composers. The instruments include harpsichords and fortepianos dating from 1750 to 1840 – including an Erard pianoforte reputedly made for Marie Antoinette. It is one of the few French instruments of the time to escape destruction for firewood following the 1789 French Revolution. The pieces were brought together to represent those instrument makers who were highly regarded or patronised by composers, rather than to illustrate a complete or technical history of keyboard manufacture. Twelve of the instruments were actually owned or played by great composers such as Purcell, J. C. Bach, Mozart, Beethoven, Chopin, Liszt, Mahler and Elgar.

=== Paintings ===
Hatchlands also houses part of the Cobbe collection of paintings, including what is claimed to be one of only two surviving portraits of William Shakespeare painted during his lifetime.

Selection of paintings in the Cobbe Collection

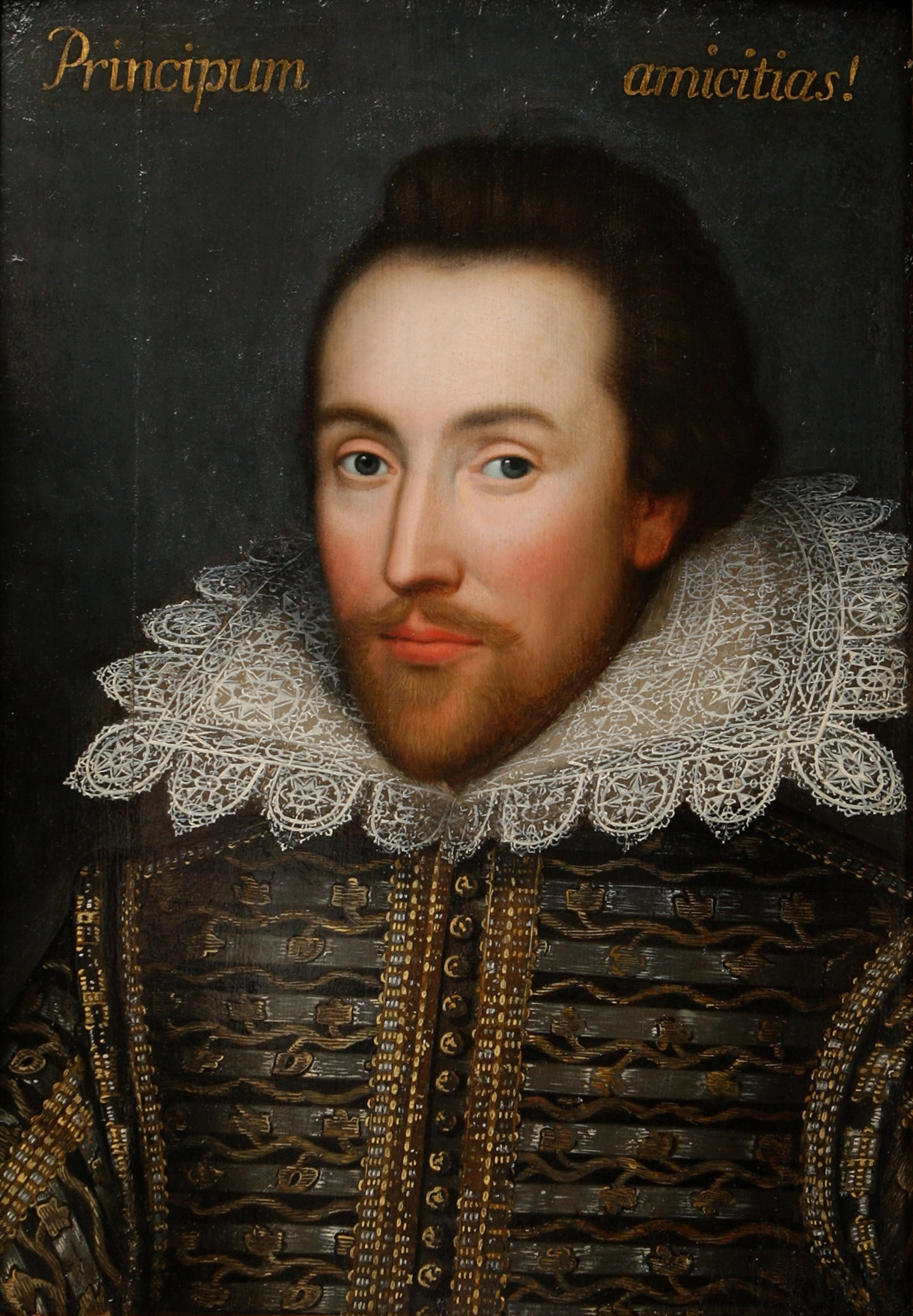
The Cobbe portrait

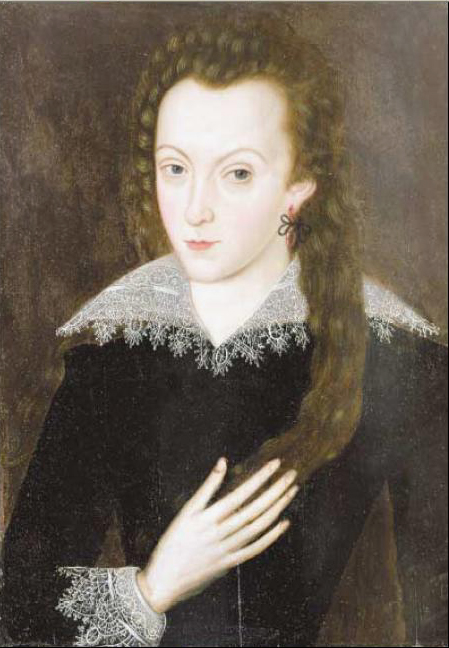
Henry Wriothesley, attributed to John de Critz

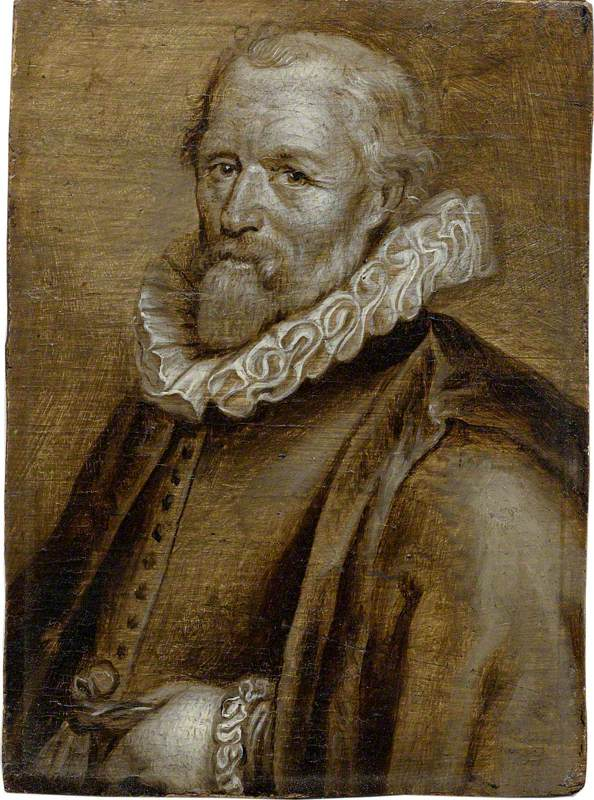
Johannes Meyssens by Jacob Matham (1571-1631)

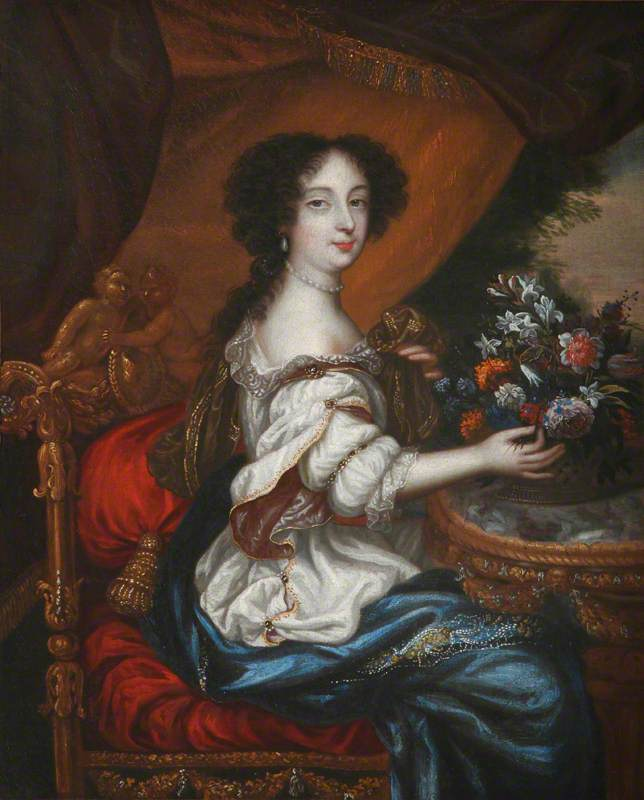
Barbara Villiers by Henri Gascar (1634-1701)

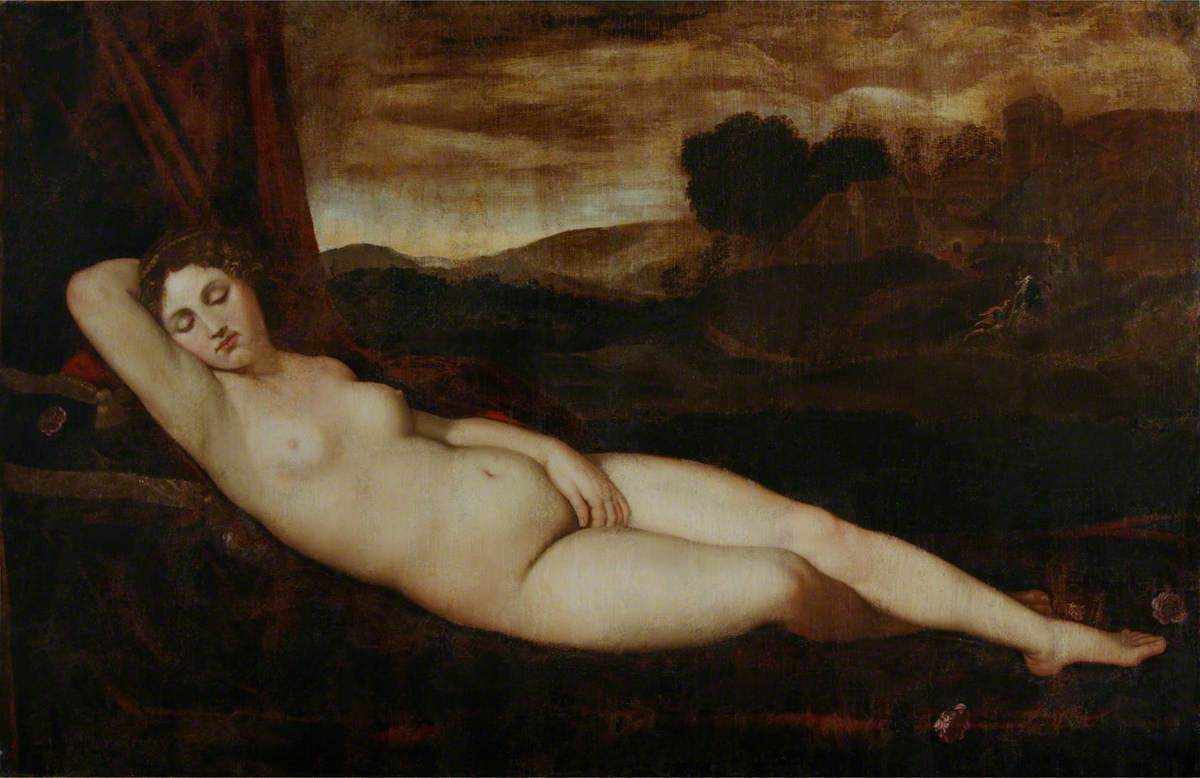
Venus Sleeping in a Landscape, after Titian

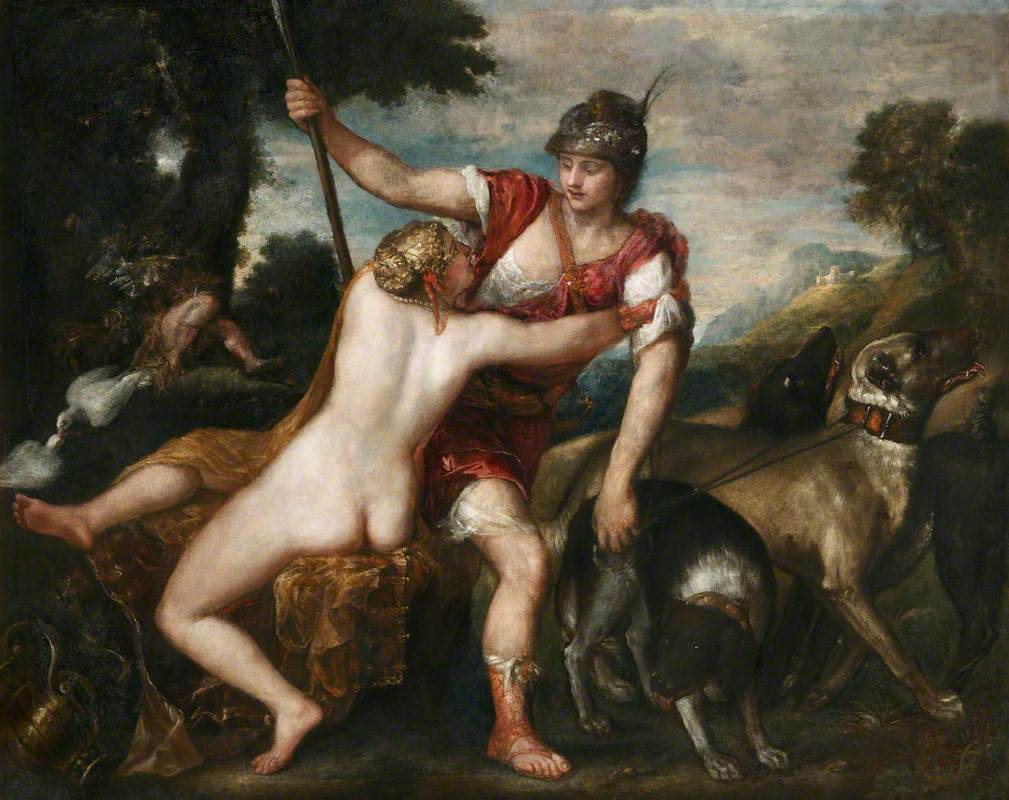
Venus and Adonis by Titian

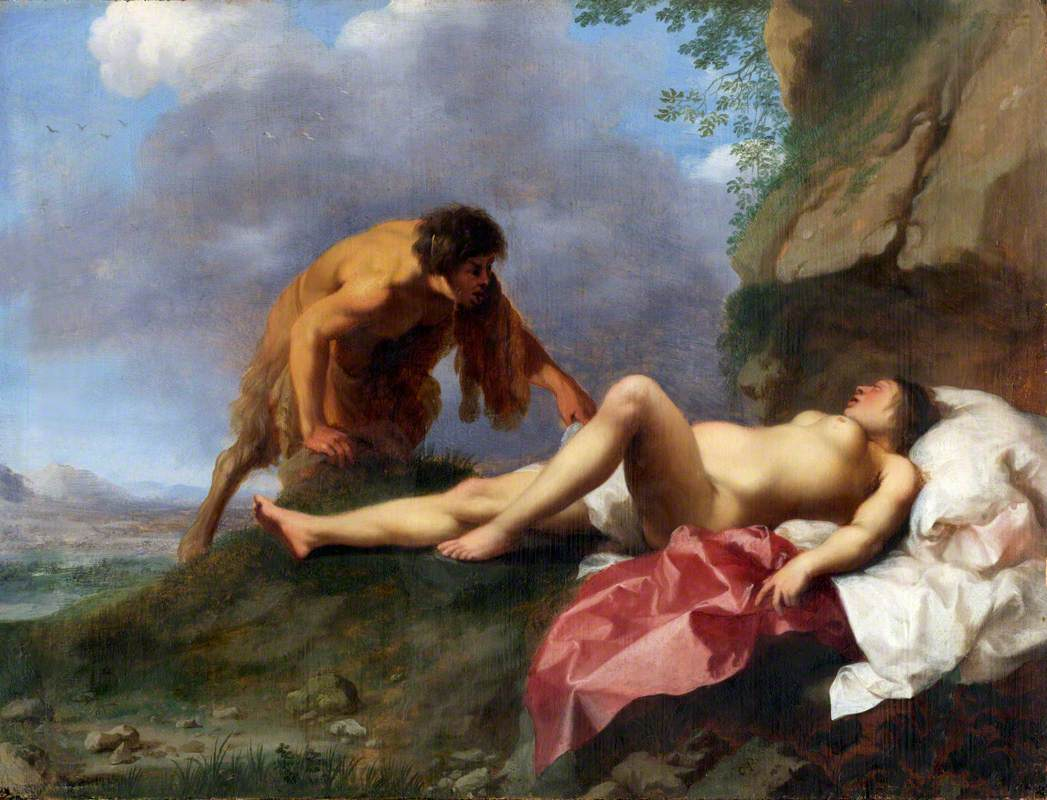
Jupiter and Antiope by Cornelis van Poelenburgh (1594-1667)

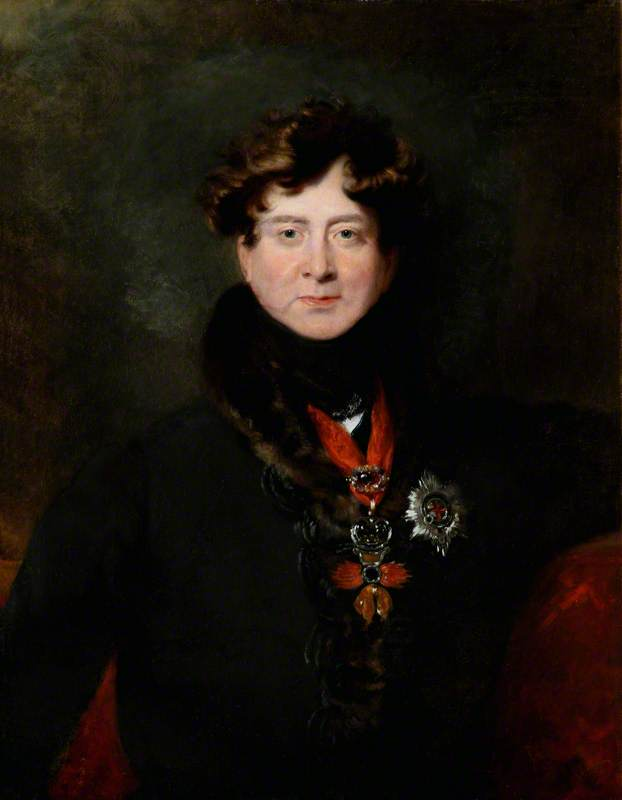
George IV by Thomas Lawrence

== See also ==
- Clandon Park, another National Trust property located nearby
