= Charlotte Bolland =

English art historian

Charlotte Bolland FSA
- Education: Queen Mary University of London (PhD)
- Occupation: National Portrait Gallery
- Years active: 2011-present

Charlotte Bolland FSA is senior curator for sixteenth century collections at the National Portrait Gallery, London.

== Career ==
Bolland has a degree in history from the University of Durham and a master's degree in history of art from the Courtauld Institute of Art. She completed her PhD at the Queen Mary University of London in 2011 on "Italian Material Culture at the Tudor Court".

She was elected a Fellow of the Society of Antiquaries of London on 12 December 2019.

== Select publications ==
- Bolland C. 2012. "London Lives: Portraits of an Italian Merchant Elite", in A. Sutton, ed., The Medieval Merchant (2012 Harlaxton Conference Proceedings).
- Bolland C. 2013. ‘"Alla Prudentissima Et Virtuosissima Reina Elisabetta: An Englishman’s Italian Dedication to the Queen", in P. Kaufman, ed., Leadership and Elizabethan Culture. Palgrave Macmillan.
- Bolland C. and Cooper, T. 2014. The Real Tudors: Kings and Queens Rediscovered. National Portrait Gallery.
- Bolland C. and Maisonneuve, C. 2015. Les Tudors. Les editions Rmn-Grand Palais.
- Bolland C. 2015. "Sat Super Est: A Portrait of Henry Howard, Earl of Surrey" in T. Cooper, A. Burnstock, M. Howard and E. Town eds, Painting in Britain 1500-1630: Production, Influences and Patronage. British Academy.
- Bolland C. and Cooper, T. 2017. The Encounter: Drawings from Leonardo to Rembrandt. National Portrait Gallery.
