= East Clandon =

Village and civil parish in Surrey, England

Coordinates: 51°15′11″N 0°29′01″W

- Village and civil parish
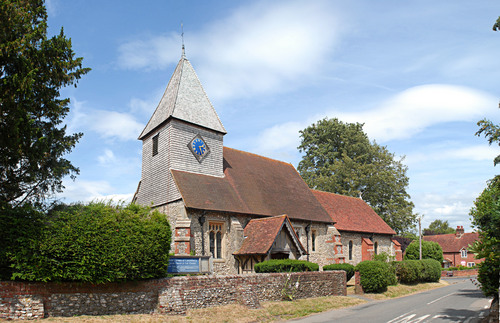
- Church of Thomas Becket, East Clandon

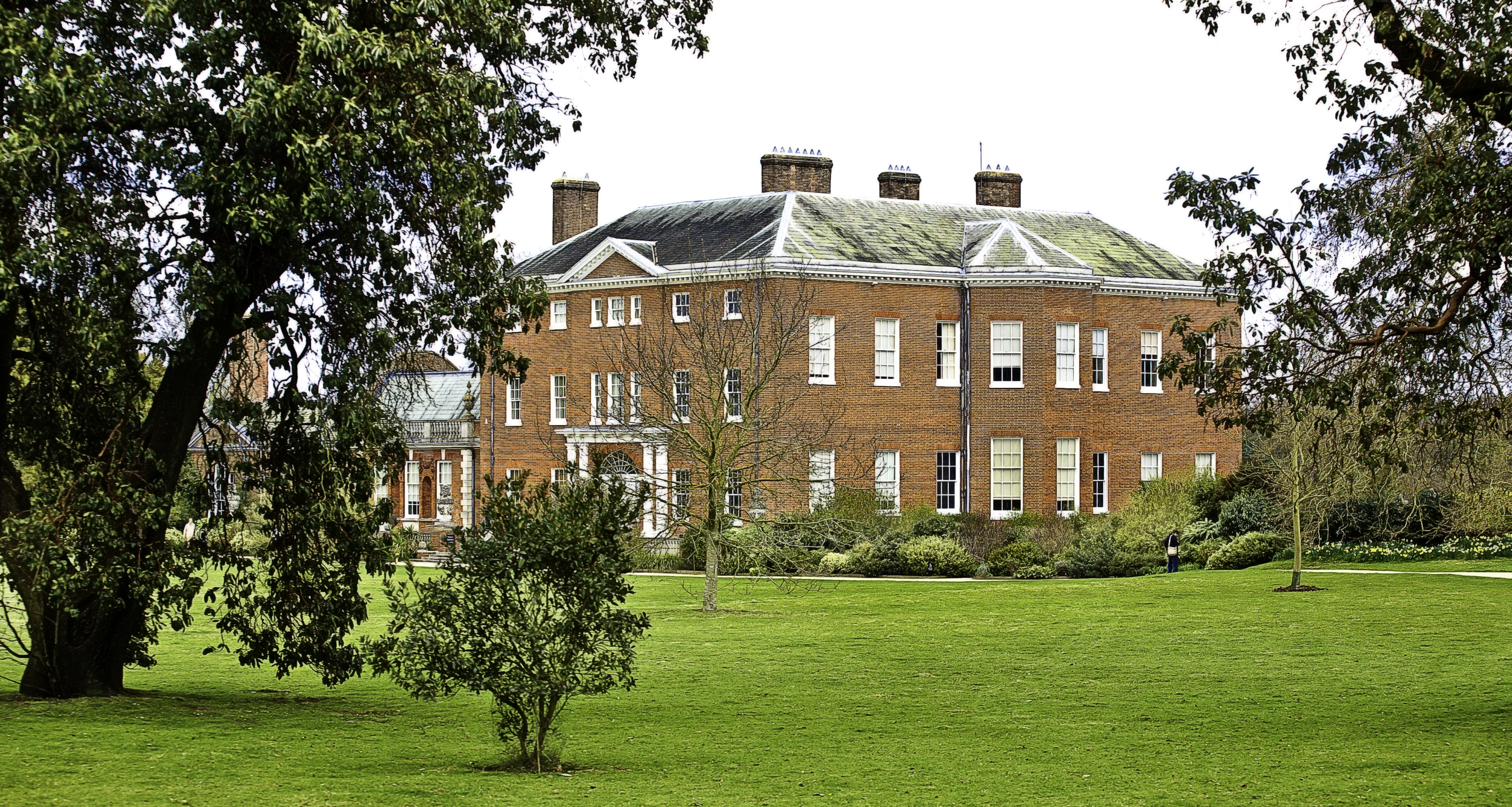
- Hatchlands Park (National Trust)

- Location within Surrey
- Area: 5.86 km^{2} (2.26 sq mi)
- Population: 268 (Civil Parish)
  - Density: 46/km^{2} (120/sq mi)
- OS grid reference: TQ059515
- District: Guildford
- Shire county: Surrey
- Region: South East
- Country: England
- Sovereign state: United Kingdom
- Post town: Guildford
- Postcode district: GU4
- Dialling code: 01483
- Police: Surrey
- Fire: Surrey
- Ambulance: South East Coast
- UK Parliament: Guildford

East Clandon is a village and civil parish in Surrey, England on the A246 between the towns of Guildford to the west and Leatherhead to the east. Neighbouring villages include West Clandon and West Horsley.

In 2011 it had a population of 268 in 109 households clustered around three buildings, the church of St Thomas of Canterbury, The Queen's Head pub and the village hall. Centred 4 miles (6 km) east of Guildford, the parish landscape on the lower slopes of the North Downs includes the 1,836-acre Ryde Farm Estate, Hatchlands Park, a National Trust estate, arable and livestock farmland, woodlands, High Clandon Vineyard and Clandon Regis Golf Club.

== History ==
=== Early history ===
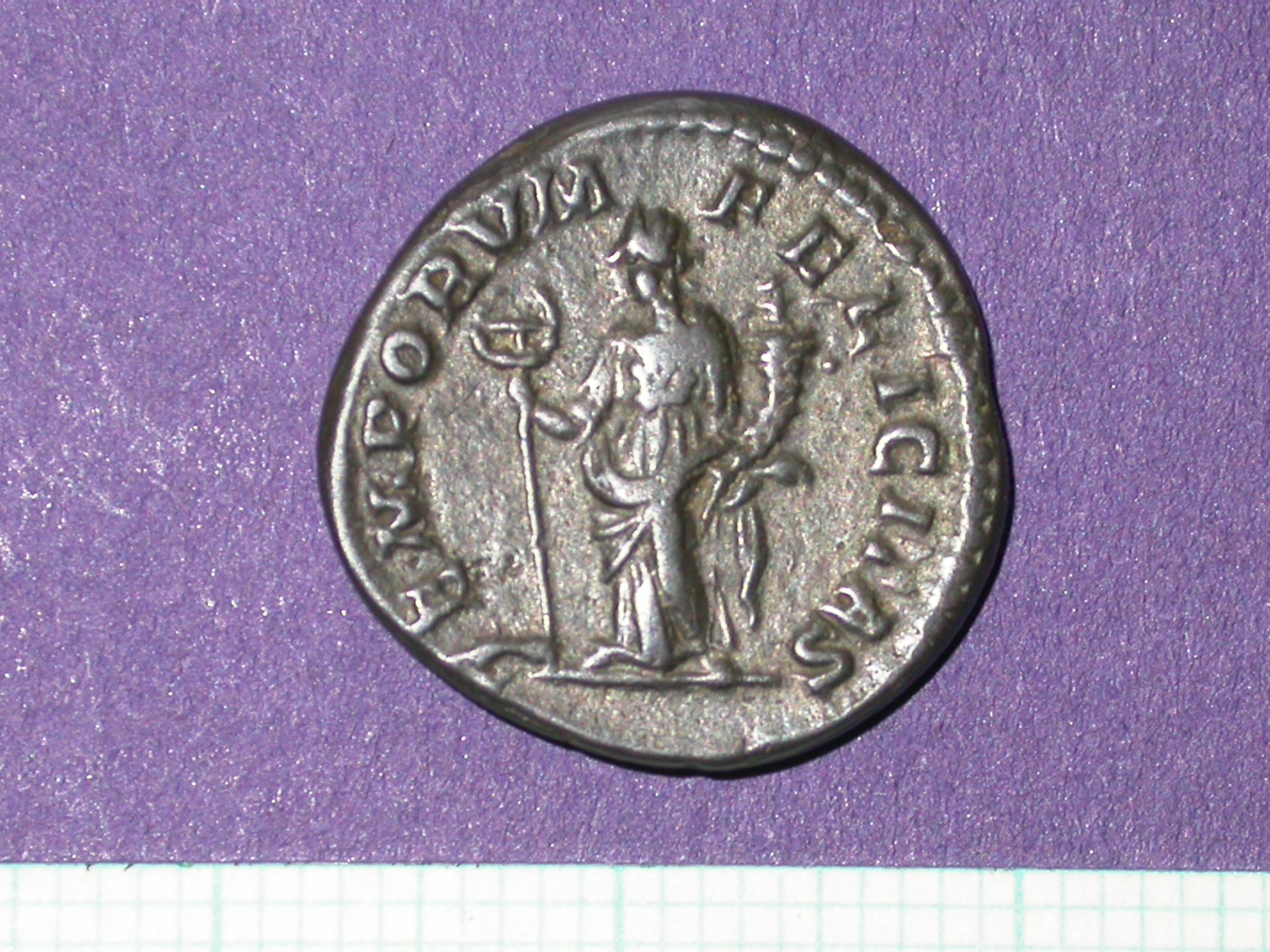
A silver denarius, issued in the reign of Elagabalus (218–222), found in East Clandon in 2002

The word Clandon (first recorded as Clanedune) goes back to Anglo-Saxon times, meaning "clean down" (open downland) from the North Downs hills that rise to the south of the village. People settled here due to the availability of water that emerged where the high chalk downs meet the lower lying clay to the north.

Chertsey Abbey, a Benedictine foundation, was patron of East Clandon from the Norman Conquest of 1066 to the dissolution of the monasteries in 1539. East Clandon appears in Domesday Book as Clanedun. It was held by Chertsey Abbey. Its assets were then: 4 hides; 7 ploughs, woodland for 6 hogs. It rendered £6 per year to its overlords. In ancient documents the village is also often referred to as Clandon Abbatis (Abbot's Clandon). The church was built in the 12th and 13th centuries and is a Grade I listed building (the highest category). The main addition to it has been a bell tower added in 1900.

In 1544 Henry VIII granted East Clandon Manor to Sir Anthony Browne. The manor house, thought to have been close to where Hatchlands Park now is, was moated since times of unrest in the early 14th century. The house, and with it the village, changed hands many times during the next 200 years.

The oldest houses in the village, Frogmore Cottage, Lamp Cottage, Old Manor Farm, Tunmore Cottage among others, had already been built when the London brewer John Raymond sold the Hatchlands Park estate to Admiral Boscawen in 1749. The present Hatchlands House was built for him with the help of prize money from his victory over the French, and it was completed in 1758, only three years before the Admiral died.

=== 1761 to present ===
From 1768 the Sumner family owned the Hatchlands estate until it was bought at auction in 1888 by Lord Rendel. In 1913 his eldest daughter's son Captain Harry Stuart Goodhart-Rendel inherited the estate in trust. The captain was a professional architect and took a great interest in the village and its inhabitants. According to the writings of Maurice Wiggin, Goodhart-Rendel was a tall, spare, upright figure making his daily round in the village dressed in his grey tweed suit and soft brown trilby shouting to his dogs in a real Grenadier's voice. Every Christmas this 'squire' gave a children's tea party at Hatchlands, complete with Christmas tree and gifts for all comers. Christmas carol concerts are still held at Hatchlands for villagers today.

Several houses in the village were built to his drawings, including Antler's Corner, Appletree Cottage, Meadow Cottage and 5 School Lane (1910), Prospect Cottages (1914), Snelgate Cottages (1926) and the St Thomas' Housing Society Cottages (1947).

In 1945 the Hatchlands house, park and some land were given to the National Trust. When Captain Goodhart-Rendel died in 1959 the estate passed into the hands of two relatives, a split he regarded with misgivings. Late 20th century owners, the Dunne-Ritche estate, sold most houses around 1970, but a few still remain in their possession.

The TV series Catweazle was shot in East Clandon (on Home Farm), West Horsley and the surrounding area in summer 1969. Home Farm still hosts the annual Hexwood Summer Fete.

=== Notable residents ===
- Sir Anthony Browne (1500–1548) standard bearer of England, owner of Manor of East Clandon
- Thomas Goffe (1591–1629) A minor Jacobean playwright. Rector of East Clandon
- Admiral Edward Boscawen (1711–1761) Builder of Hatchlands Park
- Stuart Rendel, 1st Baron Rendel (1834–1913) Founder of University College of Wales, Aberystwyth and owner of Hatchlands Park.
- Harry Stuart Goodhart-Rendel (1887–1959) Architect and Slade Professor of Fine Art at Oxford University. President of the Royal Institute of British Architects. Owner of Hatchlands Park.
- Francis Octavius Grenfell (1880–1915) Recipient of the first Victoria Cross of the First World War; born at Hatchlands Park.
- Sir Freddie Laker (1922–2006). Airline pioneer. Lived at New Manor Farm.

== Demography and housing ==
2011 Census Homes
Output area	Detached	Semi-detached	Terraced	Flats and apartments	Caravans/temporary/mobile homes	shared between households
(Civil Parish)	47	49	11	2	0	0

The average proportion of accommodation in the region composed of detached houses was 28%, the average that was apartments was 22.6%.

2011 Census Key Statistics
Output area	Population	Households	% Owned outright	% Owned with a loan	hectares
(Civil Parish)	268	109	46.8%	27.5%	586

The proportion of households in the civil parish who owned their home outright compares to the regional average of 35.1%. The proportion who owned their home with a loan compares to the regional average of 32.5%. The remainder is made up of rented dwellings (plus a negligible % of households living rent-free).

== See also ==
- List of places of worship in Guildford (borough)
