= Jupiter and Antiope =

Theme in western painting

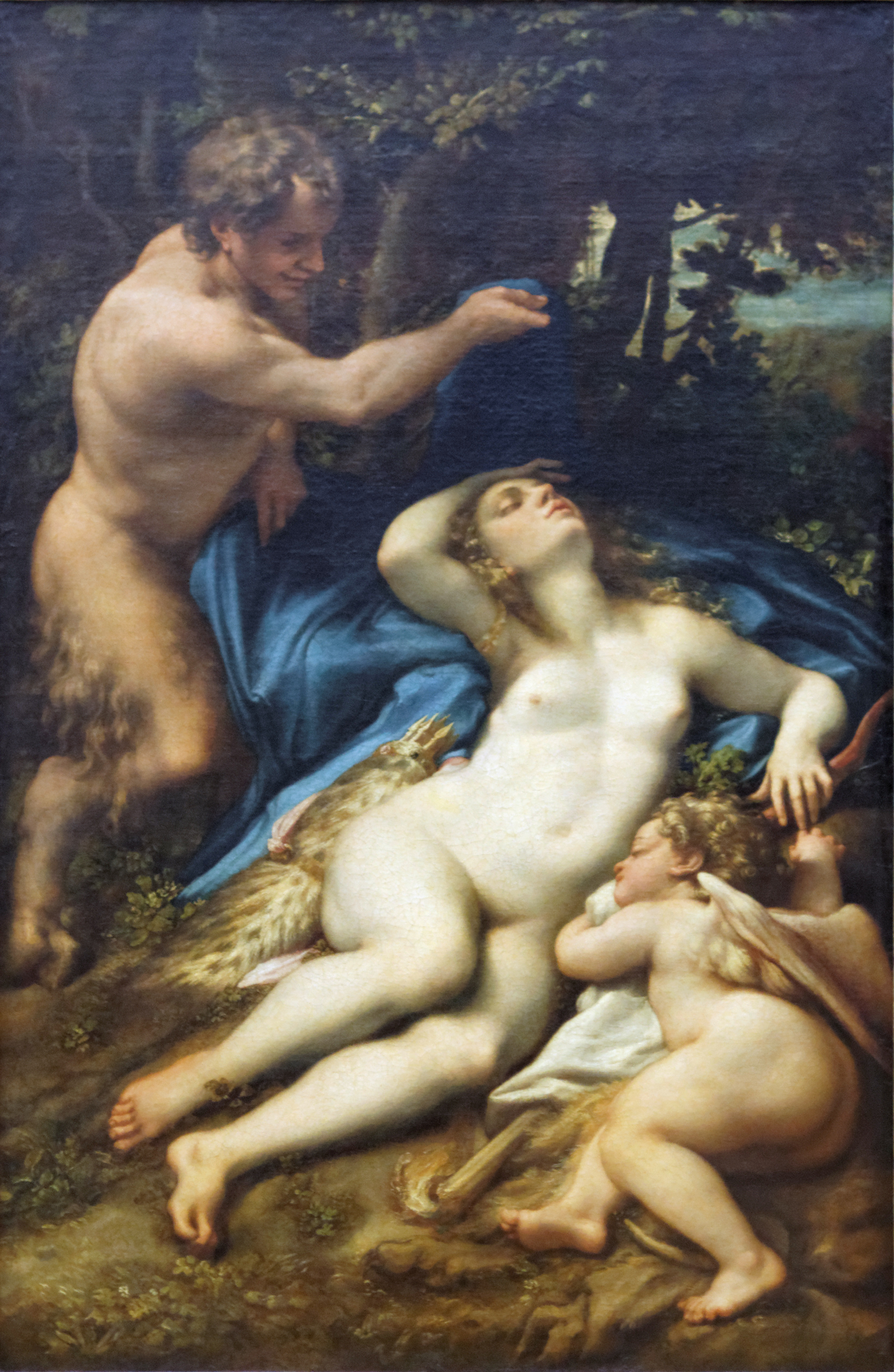
Correggio, Jupiter and Antiope (with Eros), c.1528

Jupiter and Antiope is a frequent theme in western painting and has been treated by Titian, Van Dyck, Watteau and David among others.

They are based on the story of the seduction of Antiope by the god Zeus in Greek mythology, later imported into Roman mythology and told of the god Jupiter. According to this myth, Antiope, the beautiful daughter of King Nycteus of Thebes, was surprised and seduced by Zeus in the form of a satyr. She became pregnant and bore the twins Amphion and Zethus, who later killed Nycteus' brother Lycus in revenge for his treatment of Antiope and took over the city of Thebes.

== Satyr and Nymph ==
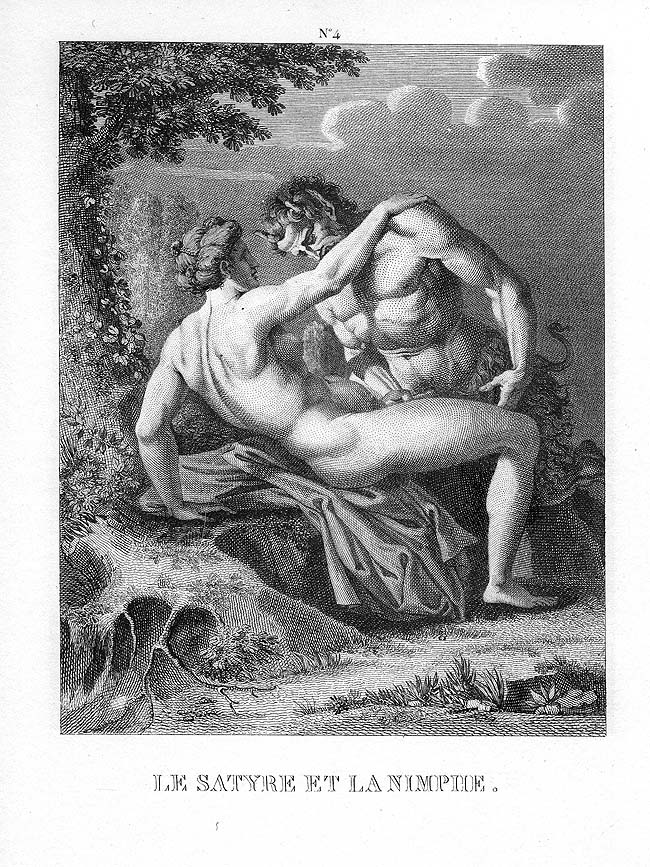
Agostino Carracci: Le Satyre et la Nymphe

Satyrs and nymphs form two extremes in Greek mythology, which are united only by their instinctive natures. While the nymph was the source of the psychological term nymphomania (now hypersexuality), the satyr was the source of the once common but now outdated term satyriasis and can be understood as the nymph's male equivalent.

Accordingly, both nymphs and satyrs are very regularly depicted in mythology - and thence also in their subsequent artistic reception - in erotic contexts and are accordingly favoured topics of art. In addition, there is a clear aesthetic contrast between the two stereotypes. The nymph is, in general, very beautiful and physically perfect. They were mostly depicted with ivory, light, and very delicate colours and an idealised female form, having close similarities with depictions of Venus. On the other hand, the satyrs, who are the followers of Bacchus, are very ugly, with the horns, legs and sometimes the tail of a goat. They are also strong, muscular, and tanned. Thus nymphs and satyrs present an optical contrast, which could hardly be any stronger and which makes them a perfect pair for artistic purposes.
