= Alec Cobbe =

British painter (1945–2026)

Alec Cobbe CVO
- Born: Richard Alexander Charles Cobbe; 9 January 1945; Dublin, Ireland
- Died: 31 March 2026 (aged 81); Surrey, England
- Occupations: Designer, artist and musical instrument collector

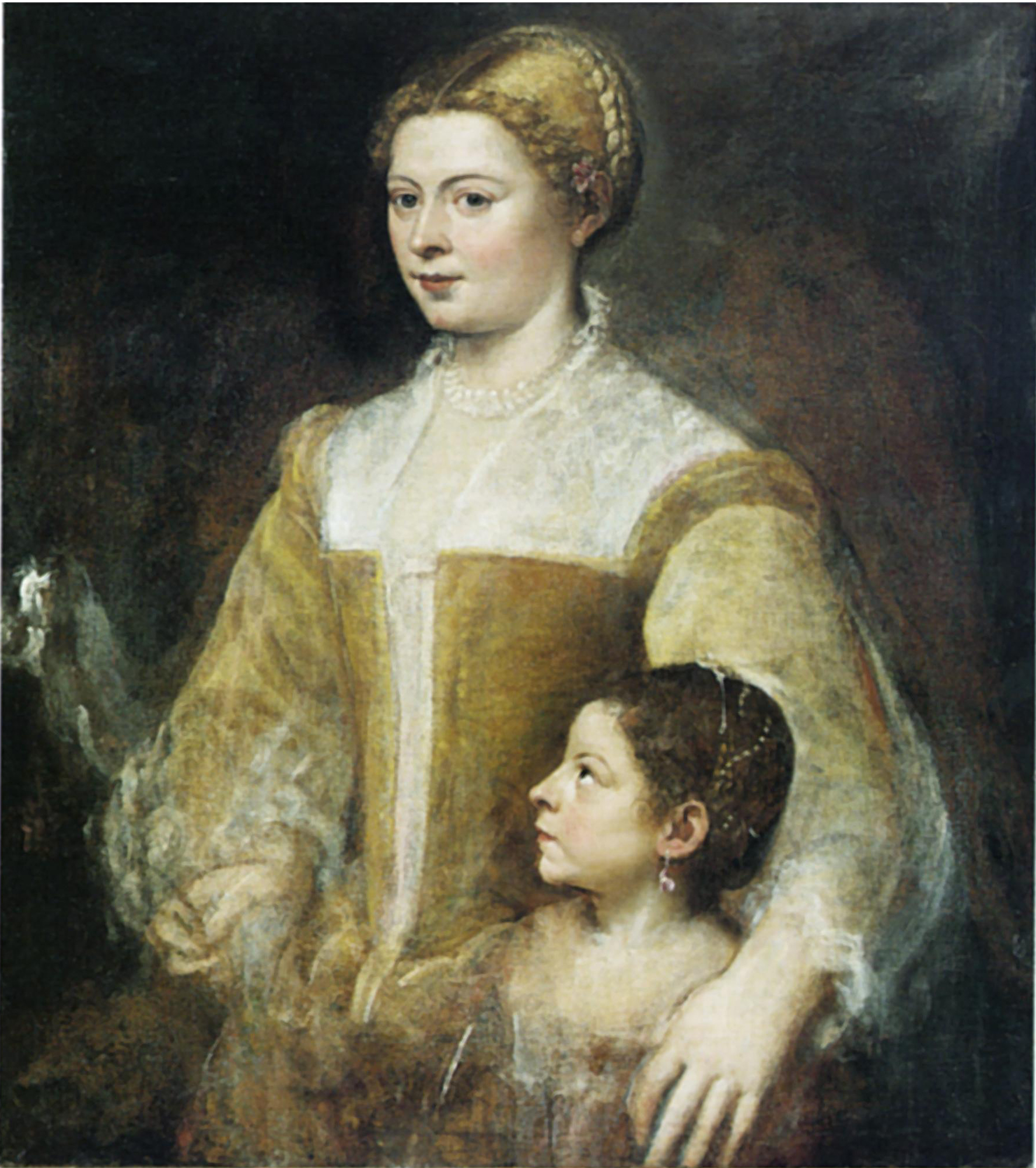
Newly discovered Titian's "Portrait of a Lady and her Daughter" from Cobbe's collection

Richard Alexander Charles Cobbe, CVO (9 January 1945 – 31 March 2026) was an Irish designer, artist, musical instrument collector and decorator.

== Life and career ==
A member of the Cobbe family, Cobbe was born in Dublin on 9 January 1945. He moved to Newbridge House with his family upon the death of his father.

Cobbe studied medicine at Corpus Christi College, Oxford, and underwent his clinical training at the London Hospital. Cobbe gave up his study of medicine to become a painter and trained as an art conservator at the Tate. From the early 1980s Cobbe advised on the redecoration of historic British country houses. Solo exhibitions of his paintings have been held in Paris at the Galerie de Staël, and in London at the Maclean Gallery, the Bury Street Gallery, and the Royal Danish Embassy.

He donated his design archive to the Victoria and Albert Museum (V&A) and an exhibition was held at the V&A of his work in 2013.

The Cobbe Collection, Cobbe's collection of historic musical instruments is kept at Hatchlands Park, a National Trust property that Cobbe leased from 1984.

On 25 July 1970 he married the Honourable Isabel Anne Marie Henrietta Dillon, daughter of the 20th Viscount Dillon. He was uncle to the Olympic gold medal-winning rower Constantine Louloudis.

On 13 February 2026 Cobbe was appointed a Commander of the Royal Victorian Order (CVO).. He died at home on 31 March 2026, at the age of 81.

== Sources ==
- Bryant, Julius (2013). Alec Cobbe: Designs for Historic Interiors. VA. ISBN 978-1-851777-723.
- John, Richard (1996). Creations and Recreations Alec Cobbe: Thirty Years of Design and Painting. PoWIA. ISBN 978-1-898465-13-3.
