= June Schlueter =

June Schlueter is Charles A. Dana Professor Emerita of English at Lafayette College in Easton, Pennsylvania. Her areas of specialty are Shakespeare, Early Modern England, and Modern Drama. She is married to Paul Schlueter, who is a specialist in English literature. Schlueter has taught at Lafayette College since 1977 where she has taught: Modern Drama (American, British, Comparative); Shakespeare; The London Theatre (in London); Drama Survey (Greeks through Shakespeare, Restoration through Modern); Tudor and Stuart Drama; introductory writing and literature courses; British literature survey; Major American Writers; introductory writing and literature courses; interdisciplinary courses on the McCarthy era and on literature, science, and technology; advised student dramatic productions. From 1993 until 2006 she was Provost of Lafayette College. Schlueter has served on the Board of Trustees for Fairleigh Dickinson University.

Schlueter has a B.A (1970). Fairleigh Dickinson University (English, magna cum laude), an M.A. (1973) from Hunter College in English and a Ph.D. from Columbia University in English and Comparative Literature.

== Books written ==
- Metafictional Characters in Modern Drama. New York: Columbia University Press, 1979.
- The Plays and Novels of Peter Handke. Pittsburgh: University of Pittsburgh Press, 1981.
- Arthur Miller. New York: Ungar, 1987 (with James K. Flanagan—Flanagan wrote introductory biographical chapter).
- Reading Shakespeare in Performance: King Lear. Madison: Fairleigh Dickinson UP, 1991 (with James P. Lusardi).
- Dramatic Closure: Reading the End. Madison: Fairleigh Dickinson UP, 1995.
- The Album Amicorum and the London of Shakespeare’s Time. London: The British Library, 2011.

== Books edited ==
- The English Novel: Twentieth Century Criticism, Vol. 2: Twentieth Century Novelists. Athens: Ohio UP, 1982 (with Paul Schlueter).
- Modern American Literature, Supplement II. New York: Ungar, 1985 (with Paul Schlueter).
- An Encyclopedia of British Women Writers. New York: Garland Publishing, 1988 (with Paul Schlueter). Reprinted in substantial part in Wilson, Katharina M. and Paul and June Schlueter, ed. Women Writers of Great Britain and Europe: An Encyclopedia (New York: Garland Publishing, 1997). Second, revised and expanded ed. (New Brunswick: Rutgers UP, 1999) (with Paul Schlueter).
- Feminist Rereadings of Modern American Drama. Madison: Fairleigh Dickinson UP, 1989. ISBN 9780838633595
- Modern American Drama: The Female Canon. Madison: Fairleigh Dickinson UP, 1990. ISBN 9780838633878
- Approaches to Teaching Beckett’s Waiting for Godot. New York: Modern Language Ass’n., 1991 (with Enoch Brater). ISBN 9780873525428
- Critical Essays: The Two Gentlemen of Verona. New York: Garland Publishing, 1996. ISBN 9780815310204
- Francis A. March: Selected Writings of the First Professor of English. Easton, PA: Lafayette College, 2005 (with Paul Schlueter). ISBN 9780976516200
- Acts of Criticism: Performance Matters in Shakespeare and His Contemporaries. Madison: Fairleigh Dickinson UP, 2006 (with Paul Nelsen). ISBN 9781611473025
- (with Dennis McCarthy) Thomas North's 1555 Travel Journal: From Italy to Shakespeare (Fairleigh Dickinson University Press, 2021) ISBN 9781683933052

== Editorships ==
- Editor, Shakespeare Bulletin, 1984‑2003; associate editor, 1982-84 (with James P. Lusardi).
- Editor, Pennsylvania English, journal of The Pennsylvania College English Association, 1981‑86 (with Paul Schlueter).
