= Tarnya Cooper =

Art historian and author

- Education: University of Sussex (PhD)
- Occupations: National Trust Curatorial & Collections Director. Former National Portrait Gallery Chief Curator.
- Years active: 1996–present

Tarnya Cooper is an English art historian and author who is currently the National Trust's Curatorial & Collections Director.

She has previously been the Chief Curator and Curatorial Director at the National Portrait Gallery, London.

== Education and employment ==
Cooper received her MA in art history from the Courtauld Institute of Art in 1996 where she studied Dutch and Flemish art. She obtained a DPhil from the University of Sussex in 2002. The title of her thesis (2001) was: Memento mori portraiture: painting, Protestant culture and the patronage of middle elites in England and Wales, 1540 - 1630.

She was Assistant Curator of the College Art Collections and taught art history at University College London.

She moved to the NPG in 2002 to become the 16th Century Curator. She led the seven-year "Making Art in Tudor Britain" project. This project encompassed a detailed and comprehensive scientific survey of Tudor paintings in the NPG. The NPG received a grant from the Getty Foundation to enable her to write Citizen Portrait based in part on her D Phil dissertation together with her research in her role as curator at the NPG. In 2010 she was awarded a senior research fellowship by the Paul Mellon Centre for Studies in British Art which enabled her to complete the book.

She was appointed Chief Curator at the NPG in 2011 and was elected as a fellow of the Society of Antiquaries of London in June of that year.

In January 2018, she became the National Trust's Curatorial & Collections Director. In this role she will deliver the Trust’s curatorial strategy, including research, engagement, and care for collections and buildings.

== Exhibitions ==
During her time at UCL, she curated two exhibitions from the college's collections. She co-curated (with David Starkey) the exhibition Elizabeth I at the National Maritime Museum in 2003 and was a contributor to the catalogue.

She curated Searching for Shakespeare at the National Portrait Gallery in 2006. She was the curator of the exhibition Elizabeth I & her people which was held at the NPG from October 2013 to January 2014. This exhibition included a miniature portrait of Elizabeth I found in a house clearance in 2012, that Cooper described as "a very high quality image by a 16th-century artist".

She also curated the display The Real Tudors at the National Portrait Gallery (12 September 2014 – 1 March 2015), which includes results from the NPG's "Making Art in Tudor Britain" research project. She is co-editor of Painting in Britain 1500 - 1630: Production, Influences, and Patronage, an interdisciplinary survey published by the British Academy and Oxford University Press in 2015.

== Publications ==
- Cooper, Tarnya, ed. (1997). Refashioning Death; Vanitas and Memento Mori Prints from Northern Europe, 1514-c1640. University College.
- Cooper, Tarnya, ed. (2000). Drawing Practices, Mediums and Methods, 1500–1950. University College.
- Cooper, Tarnya (2003). "The Queen's Visual Presence". In Starkey, David (ed.). Elizabeth I; The Exhibition Catalogue. Chatto & Windus.
- Cooper, Tarnya (2006). Searching for Shakespeare. National Portrait Gallery Publications.
- Cooper, Tarnya (2008). Tudor and Jacobean Portraiture. National Portrait Gallery Publications.
- Cooper, Tarnya (2010). "The enchantment of the familiar face". In Hamling, Tara; Richardson, Catherine (eds.). Everyday Objects: Medieval and Early Modern Material Culture and Its Meanings. Ashgate Publishing. p. 173.
- Cooper, Tarnya (2012). Citizen Portrait. Yale University Press.
- Cooper, Tarnya; Archer, Ian W; Orlin, Lena Cowen (2013). Elizabeth I & Her People. National Portrait Gallery. ISBN 978-1855144651.
- Cooper, Tarnya; Bolland, Charlotte (2014). The Real Tudors : kings and queens rediscovered. London: National Portrait Gallery. ISBN 9781855144927.
- Cooper, Tarnya; Burnstock, Aviva; Howard, Maurice; Town, Edward, eds. (2015). Painting in Britain 1500 - 1630: production, influences and patronage. Oxford: Oxford University Press. ISBN 9780197265840.
