= John Taylor =

John Taylor, Johnny Taylor or similar may refer to:

== Academics ==
- John Taylor (Oxford), Vice-Chancellor of Oxford University, 1486–1487
- John Taylor (classical scholar) (1704–1766), English classical scholar
- John Taylor (English publisher) (1781–1864), British publisher and Egypt scholar
- John B. Taylor (born 1946), American economist, known as the creator of the Taylor rule
- Sir John Michael Taylor, former director general of the UK's Research Councils in the Office of Science and Technology, architect of the UK e-Science programme
- John Taylor, president of Pittsburgh Academy in 1801; see History of the University of Pittsburgh
- John R. Taylor (born 1939), British-born emeritus professor of physics at the University of Colorado, Boulder

== Arts and entertainment ==
=== TV and film ===
- John Taylor (documentary filmmaker) (1914–1992), British documentary filmmaker
- John Taylor (presenter), Australian television presenter
- John Taylor (voice actor), voice of Sal the space octopus in Astroblast!

=== Art ===
- John Taylor (painter) (c. 1585–1651), artist and friend of Shakespeare
- John Taylor (1739–1838), English portrait artist
- John Bigelow Taylor (born c. 1950), New York photographer

=== Writing ===
- John Taylor (poet) (1578–1653), English pamphleteer, poet and waterman
- John Taylor (journalist) (1757–1832), English oculist, drama critic, editor and newspaper publisher
- John Edward Taylor (1791–1844), British journalist, or his son, owners of the Manchester Guardian
- John Ellor Taylor (1837–1895), English popular science writer
- John Russell Taylor (1935–2025), English critic and author
- John Martin Taylor, American food writer, known as Hoppin' John
- John W. R. Taylor (1922–1999), British aviation expert and editor

=== Music ===
- John C. J. Taylor (born 1951), Australian bass player, composer, former member of Little Heroes
- John Lloyd Taylor (born 1982), guitarist with Jonas Brothers
- John Taylor (bass guitarist) (born 1960), British bassist for Duran Duran
- John Taylor, composer of the music for the British musical Charlie Girl
- John Taylor (Geordie songwriter) (1840–1891), songwriter and poet
- John Taylor (guitarist), lead guitarist for British alternative rock band Young Guns
- John Taylor (jazz) (1942–2015), English pianist
- John Taylor (Scottish fiddler), from Buckie, appeared in So I Married an Axe Murderer
- John Taylor (Unitarian hymn writer) (1750–1826), poet and composer from Norwich, England
- John T. Taylor (saxophonist), saxophonist and co-writer of "The Boy from New York City"
- Johnnie Taylor (1934–2000), American singer
- Jonny Taylor, contestant on Australian Idol
- Little Johnny Taylor (1943–2002), American singer
- John Taylor (born 1963), Jamaican dancehall musician better known as Chaka Demus
- John R. Taylor, recording engineer and producer, co-founder of Grosvenor Road Studios

=== Comedy ===
- Johnny Taylor (comedian) (born 1977), American stand-up comedian

=== Fictional characters ===
- John Taylor, protagonist of the Nightside books by Simon Green
- John Taylor, one of the protagonists in Call of Duty: Black Ops III, a 2015 video game
- Johnny Taylor, in the TV series Tracy Beaker Returns

== Business and trade ==
- John Taylor (bookseller) (fl. 1710s), English bookseller and publisher in St. Paul's Churchyard, London
- John Taylor (manufacturer) (1704–1775), English manufacturer and banker of Birmingham
- John Taylor of Ashbourne (1711–1788), English lawyer and cleric
- John Taylor (mining engineer) (1779–1863), English mining engineer and engineer of the Tavistock Canal
- John Taylor (paper manufacturer) (1809–1871), Canadian pioneer in the pulp and paper industry
- John Taylor (settler) (1821–1890), settler to York, Western Australia
- John Taylor (architect) (1833–1912), British architect
- John Taylor (Taylor Ham) (1837–1909), American food inventor and entrepreneur
- John Taylor (trader) (died 1898), Creole trader killed during Sierra Leone's Hut Tax War
- John Taylor (Velocette) (c. 1857–1929), founder of Veloce Ltd. motorcycle firm
- John Taylor (inventor) (born 1936), horologist and inventor of controls for electric kettles
- Johnny C. Taylor Jr., American lawyer, author and public speaker
- John Donnithorne Taylor (1798–1885), English landowner
- John R. Taylor III (born 1957), American computer game designer
- John William Taylor (1827–1906), English philanthropist and bellfounder
- Sir John Taylor, 1st Baronet (1745–1786), dilettante

== Crime ==
- John Taylor (pirate) (fl. 1718–1723), active in the East Indies and Indian Ocean
- John Albert Taylor (1959–1996), American rapist and murderer, executed by firing squad
- John B. Taylor, American multiple murderer, convicted for the Wendy's massacre
- John Taylor (criminal) (born 1956), British convicted murderer and rapist

== Military ==
- John Taylor (Medal of Honor), American Civil War sailor and Medal of Honor recipient
- John Taylor (Royal Navy) (1775–1848), Scottish sailor who served with Nelson then emigrated to Canada
- John Taylor (VC) (1822–1857), English sailor
- John R. M. Taylor (1865–1949), U.S. infantry captain who compiled what became known as the Philippine Insurgent Records
- John Taylor (archivist) (1921–2008), American military archivist at the National Archives
- John Thomas Taylor (1886–1965), American soldier, lawyer, and chief lobbyist for the American Legion from 1919 to 1950
- John Lowther du Plat Taylor (1829–1904), British founder of the Army Post Office Corps and the Post Office Rifles
- John Debenham Taylor (1920–2016), British intelligence officer
- John Taylor, alias of British woman Mary Anne Talbot (1778–1808), who was a sailor and soldier during the French Revolutionary Wars

== Politics and the law ==
=== Australia ===
- John Howard Taylor (1861–1925), Western Australian politician
- John Taylor (Australian politician) (1908–1961), Member of the Queensland Legislative Assembly
- John Taylor (public servant) (1930–2011), senior Australian public servant

=== Canada ===
- John Richard Parish Taylor (1892–1950), politician in Saskatchewan
- John Robeson Taylor (1889–1976), politician in Saskatchewan
- John Russell Taylor (politician) (1917–2002), Canadian MP representing Vancouver-Burrard
- John Taylor (Manitoba politician) (1834–1925), MLA in Manitoba
- John Taylor (Nova Scotia politician) (1816–1881), Liberal MHA for Halifax County
- John Ross Taylor (1913–1994), Canadian neo-Nazi leader

=== New Zealand ===
- John Parkin Taylor (1812–1875), MP for Dunedin Country, Superintendent of Southland Province

=== Nigeria ===
- John Taylor (Nigerian judge) (1917–1973)

=== United Kingdom ===
- John Taylor (floruit 1385–1401), MP for Reigate
- John Taylor (by 1493–1547 or later), MP for Hastings
- John Taylor (by 1533–1568), MP for Lichfield
- John Bladen Taylor (1764–1820), MP for Hythe
- John Taylor (1655–1729), MP for Sandwich
- John Taylor, Baron Ingrow (1917–2002), life peer, brewer and politician, former Lord Lieutenant of West Yorkshire
- John Taylor, Baron Kilclooney (born 1937), Northern Ireland politician
- John Taylor, Baron Taylor of Holbeach (born 1943), Conservative life peer and director of Taylor's Bulbs of Spalding
- John Taylor, Baron Taylor of Warwick (born 1952), Conservative
- John Taylor (Dumbarton Burghs MP) (1857–1936), Liberal MP for Dumbarton Burghs, 1918–1922
- John Taylor (West Lothian MP) (1902–1962), Labour MP 1951–1962
- John Taylor (Solihull MP) (1941–2017)
- John Taylor (diplomat) (1895–1974)
- John Taylor (trade unionist) (1861/2–1942), councillor in Dudley
- John George Taylor (fl. 1850s), official of the Foreign Office, archaeologist
- John Wilkinson Taylor (politician) (1855–1934), Labour MP for Chester-le-Street, 1906–1919
- John Thomas Taylor (British Museum) (1840–1908), English museum official and local politician

=== United States ===
- John Taylor (South Carolina governor) (1770–1832), American politician from South Carolina
- John Taylor (14th Congress) (died 1821), American politician from South Carolina
- John Taylor of Caroline (1753–1824), American politician and scholar from Virginia
- John Taylor (Mississippi judge) (c. 1785–1820), justice of the first Mississippi Supreme Court
- John Taylor (19th-century Iowa politician) (1808–1886), member of the Iowa Territorial Legislature and Iowa House of Representatives
- John Taylor (20th-century Iowa politician) (1870–19??), member of the Iowa House of Representatives and Iowa Senate
- John C. Taylor (1890–1983), U.S. Representative from South Carolina
- John J. Taylor (New York politician) (1808–1892), American politician
- John J. Taylor (Pennsylvania politician) (born 1955), American politician
- John Taylor (Utah politician), American politician
- John L. Taylor (1805–1870), U.S. Representative from Ohio, 1847–55
- John Louis Taylor (1769–1829), chief justice of the North Carolina Supreme Court
- John M. Taylor, on List of justices of the Supreme Court of Alabama
- John May Taylor (1838–1911), U.S. Representative from Tennessee, 1883–87
- John P. Taylor (1874–1934), American District Attorney in New York, 1914–1920
- John Stansel Taylor (1871–1936), American citrus grower and politician from Florida
- John W. Taylor (politician) (1784–1854), New York politician and Speaker of the U.S. House of Representatives from 1820 to 1821 and 1825-1827
- John Wilkinson Taylor (educator) (1906–2001), American educator and international administrator
- John Edwards Taylor (1834–1914), mayor of Morristown, New Jersey
- John Peroutt Taylor (1855–1930), American politician from Mississippi

== Religion ==
- John Taylor (Master of the Rolls) (c. 1480–1534), British religious leader and jurist
- John Taylor (bishop of Lincoln) (c. 1503–1554), British religious leader, Bishop of Lincoln
- John Taylor (dissenting preacher) (1694–1761), English Presbyterian theologian
- John Taylor (archdeacon of Leicester) (1711–1772), English priest
- John Taylor (Baptist preacher) (1752–1833), Baptist preacher in Kentucky
- John Taylor (doctor) (died 1821), missionary in India
- John Taylor (Mormon) (1808–1887), third president of The Church of Jesus Christ of Latter-day Saints, 1880–1887
- John W. Taylor (Mormon) (1858–1916), member of the Quorum of the Twelve Apostles in The Church of Jesus Christ of Latter-day Saints
- John H. Taylor (Mormon) (1875–1946), leader in The Church of Jesus Christ of Latter-day Saints
- John Taylor (bishop of Sodor and Man) (1883–1961), Church of England bishop, and father of the below Bishop of Winchester
- John Taylor (bishop of Sheffield) (1912–1971), Bishop of Sheffield in the Church of England
- John Taylor (bishop of Winchester) (1914–2001), Anglican missionary scholar, and son of the above Bishop of Sodor and Man
- John Edward Taylor (bishop) (1914–1976), Roman Catholic bishop of Stockholm, 1962–76
- John Taylor (bishop of St Albans) (1929–2016), British priest, Bishop of St Albans, 1980–1995
- John Taylor (bishop of Glasgow and Galloway) (1932–2021), British priest, Scottish Episcopal Church, Bishop of Glasgow and Galloway, 1991–1998
- John H. Taylor (bishop) (born 1954), Episcopal bishop and chief of staff to former U.S. President Richard Nixon

== Sports ==
=== Australia ===
- John Taylor (Australian footballer) (born 1963), Australian football player
- Johnny Taylor (sportsman) (1895–1971), dual international cricketer and rugby union footballer for Australia
- John Taylor (rugby union, born 1949) (1949–2019), rugby union footballer for Australia
- John Taylor (cricketer, born 1979), former Western Australia cricketer

=== United States ===
- Jack Taylor (1890s pitcher) (1873–1900), a.k.a. "Brewery Jack", baseball player
- Jack Taylor (1900s pitcher) (1874–1938), baseball player
- John Taylor (relay runner) (1882–1908), runner; first African American Olympic gold medalist
- John Taylor (American football) (born 1962), football player
- John Taylor (baseball) (birth/death dates unknown), Negro leagues baseball player
- John Taylor (volleyball) (born 1944), American former volleyball player
- John Taylor (basketball) (born 1989), American professional basketball player
- John Taylor (sprinter) (born 1926), 3rd in the 400 m at the 1945 USA Outdoor Track and Field Championships
- John Coard Taylor (1901–1946), American sprinter
- John I. Taylor (1875–1938), owner of the Boston Red Sox, 1904–11
- Johnathan Taylor (born 1979), American football player
- Johnny Taylor (American football) (born 1961)
- Johnny Taylor (basketball) (born 1974)
- Schoolboy Johnny Taylor (1916–1987), American Negro leagues baseball player
- Steel Arm Johnny Taylor (1879–1956), American Negro leagues baseball player
- Tarzan Taylor (1895–1971), American football player and coach

=== United Kingdom ===
- Jack Taylor (footballer, born 1872) (1872–1949), Scottish footballer (John Daniel Taylor)
- Jack Taylor (referee) (1930–2012), real name John, English football referee
- Jock Taylor (John Robert Taylor, 1954–1982), British motorcycle sidecar racer
- John Henry Taylor (1871–1963), British golfer
- John Paskin Taylor (1928–2015), British Olympic field hockey player
- John Taylor (cricketer, born 1819) (1819–1911), English cricketer and clergyman
- John Taylor (cricketer, born 1849) (1849–1921), Nottinghamshire cricketer
- John Taylor (cricketer, born 1850) (1850–1924), Yorkshire cricketer
- John Taylor (cricketer, born 1923) (1923–1991), Hampshire cricketer
- John Taylor (cricketer, born 1937), English cricketer
- John Taylor (Welsh footballer) (1874–1913), Wrexham A.F.C. and Wales international footballer
- Jack Taylor (footballer, born 1914) (1914–1978), English footballer
- John Taylor (footballer, born 1924) (1924–1995), English footballer
- Jack Taylor (footballer, born 1924) (1924–1970), English footballer
- John Taylor (footballer, born 1926), English footballer
- John Taylor (footballer, born 1928) (1928–2016), English footballer
- Brian Taylor (footballer, born 1931) (John Brian Taylor), English footballer
- John Taylor (footballer, born 1935), English footballer
- John Taylor (footballer, born 1939) (1939–2016), English footballer
- John Taylor (English footballer, born 1949) (1949–2023), English footballer with Chester City, Rochdale and Stockport County
- John Taylor (Scottish footballer, born 1949), Scottish football goalkeeper
- John Taylor (footballer, born 1964), English footballer with Cambridge United and Bradford City
- John Taylor (racing driver) (1933–1966), British racing driver
- John Taylor (rallycross) (born 1941), Scottish rallycross driver, 1973 European rallycross champion
- John Taylor (rugby league) (c. 1939–2024), rugby league player of the 1950s and 1960s
- John Taylor (rugby union, born 1945) (born 1945), rugby union footballer for British Lions, Wales, Loughborough Colleges, London Welsh, London Counties, and Surrey
- John Taylor (swimmer) (1904–1980), British freestyle swimmer

=== Other countries ===
- John Taylor (cross-country skier) (1908–1989), Canadian Olympic skier
- John Taylor (hurler), Laois and Portlaoise hurler
- John Taylor (All Black), rugby player; see List of All Blacks
- John Taylor (Canadian football) (1925–2005), Canadian Football League player
- John "Pondoro" Taylor (1904–1969), Irishman, game hunter, developer of the "Taylor KO Factor"

== Other ==
- John Taylor (born 1980), fitness coach on the reality television series Too Fat for 15: Fighting Back
- John Taylor (oculist) (1703–1772), British surgeon and medical charlatan

== See also ==
- John Tayler (1742–1829), American politician from New York
- John Tyler (1790–1862), tenth president of the United States
- A. J. P. Taylor (1906–1990), British historian
- Jon Taylor (disambiguation)
- Jack Taylor (disambiguation)
- Jock Taylor (disambiguation)
- Jonathan Taylor (disambiguation)
