= John H. Taylor =

John H. Taylor may refer to:

- John H. Taylor (Mormon) (1875–1946), leader in The Church of Jesus Christ of Latter-day Saints
- John Henry Taylor (1871–1963), English golf pioneer
- John H. Taylor (bishop), Episcopal bishop and chief of staff to former U.S. President Richard Nixon
- John Henry Taylor, along with William John O'Meally, in 1958, became one of the last two people whipped in Australia

== See also ==
- John Taylor (disambiguation)
