= Brian Taylor =

Brian Taylor may refer to:

== Sportsmen ==
=== Football ===
- Brian Taylor (footballer, born 1931), English footballer
- Brian Taylor (footballer, born 1937), English footballer of the 1950s and 1960s whose clubs included Walsall, Birmingham City and Shrewsbury
- Brian Taylor (footballer, born 1942), English footballer
- Brian Taylor (footballer, born 1944), English footballer
- Brian Taylor (footballer, born 1949), English football winger/full-back of the 1970s and 1980s whose clubs included Walsall and Preston North End
- Brian Taylor (footballer, born 1954), English football defender of the 1970s and 1980s who played for Doncaster Rovers and Rochdale
- Bryan Taylor (soccer), sometimes spelled Brian Taylor, American soccer player

=== Other sports ===
- Brian Taylor (Australian footballer) (born 1962), Australian rules footballer
- Brian Taylor (basketball) (born 1951), American basketball player
- Brian Taylor (cricketer) (1932–2017), English cricketer
- Brian Taylor (jockey) (1939–1984), English jockey

== Other disciplines ==
- Brian Taylor (journalist) (born 1955), Scottish journalist
- Brian Taylor (filmmaker), director of Crank: High Voltage
- Brian Taylor (politician), former leader of British Columbia Marijuana Party and mayor of Grand Forks, British Columbia
- Brian Taylor (lecturer), sociology lecturer
- Brian R. Taylor, American politician, member of the New Hampshire House of Representatives

== See also ==
- Bryan Taylor (disambiguation)
- Brien Taylor (born 1971), American baseball player
- Brian Hope-Taylor (1923–2001), British historian and television presenter
- Brian Shawe-Taylor (1915–1999), British racing driver
