= Jack Taylor =

Jack Taylor may refer to:

== Entertainment ==
- Jack Taylor (actor) (1926–2026), American actor
- Jack Taylor (musician) (1965–1997), American musician
- Jack Taylor (TV series), an Irish television drama based on novels

== Sports ==
=== Association football (soccer) ===
- Jack Taylor (footballer, born 1872) (1872–1949), Scottish footballer for Everton FC and Scotland
- Jack Taylor (footballer, born 1914) (1914–1978), English footballer and football manager
- Jack Taylor (footballer, born 1924) (1924–1970), English footballer
- Jack Taylor (referee) (1930–2012), English football referee for the 1974 World Cup Final
- Jack Taylor (footballer, born 1998), English/Irish footballer
- Jack Taylor (footballer, born 2005), English footballer

=== Water sports ===
- Jack Taylor (rower) (1928–2016), Canadian rower
- Jack Taylor (swimmer) (1931–1955), American swimmer

=== Other sports ===
- Jack Taylor (1890s pitcher) (1873–1900), American baseball player
- Jack Taylor (1900s pitcher) (1874–1938), American baseball player with the Chicago Cubs
- Jack Taylor (rugby union, born 1877) (1877–1951), English rugby union footballer for West Hartlepool and England
- Jack Taylor (Canadian wrestler) (1887–1956), Canadian wrestler
- Jack Taylor (golfer) (1897–1971), English professional golfer
- Jack Taylor (rugby union, born 1913) (1913–1979), New Zealand rugby union footballer, coach and administrator
- Jack Taylor (Australian footballer) (born 1924), Australian rules footballer
- Jack Taylor (British wrestler) (1932–2015), British Olympic wrestler
- Jack Taylor (skier) (1948–2008), American freestyle skier
- Jack Taylor (basketball) (born 1990), American basketball player, record holder for highest single-game point total in NCAA men's basketball history
- Jack Taylor (cricketer) (born 1991), English cricketer
- Jack Taylor (rugby union, born 2003), New Zealand rugby union footballer

== Other ==
- Jack Taylor (Arizona politician) (1907–1995), American politician, mayor of Mesa, Arizona, and state legislator
- Jack Hendrick Taylor (1909–1959), United States Navy and OSS officer and Nazi concentration camp survivor
- Jack C. Taylor (1922–2016), American businessman, founder of Enterprise Rent-a-Car
- Jack Taylor (journalist) (1928–2023), American television and radio presenter
- Jack Taylor (Colorado politician) (1935–2020), American politician in Colorado
- Jack Taylor (heavyweight man) (1946–2006), fattest man in Great Britain

== See also ==
- John Taylor (disambiguation)
