= Jon Taylor (disambiguation) =

Jon Taylor (born 1992) is an English footballer.

Jon Taylor may also refer to:

- Jon Taylor (political scientist), American political scientist
- Jon Taylor (sound mixer), American re-recording mixer
- Jon Taylor, musician in Septic Death

== See also ==
- Jonny Taylor (fl. 2008), Australian Idol contestant
- John Taylor (disambiguation)
- Jonathan Taylor (disambiguation)
