= Alice S. Kandell =

American child psychologist, author, photographer

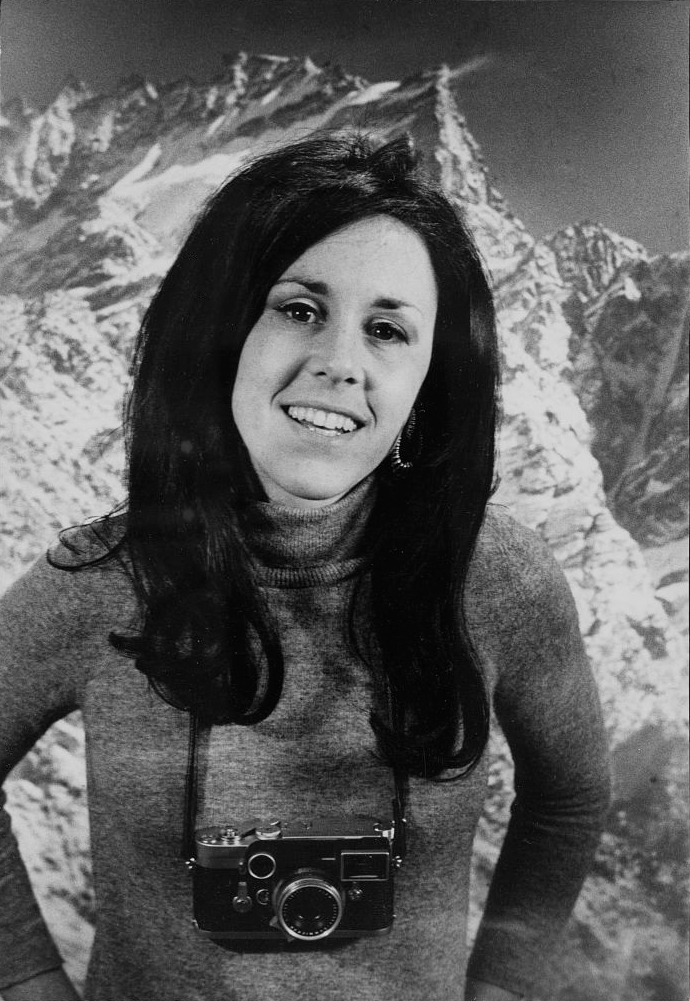
Alice S. Kandell in Sikkim, c. 1960s-1970s

Alice S. Kandell is an American child psychologist, author, photographer and art collector interested in Himalayan culture. She worked extensively in the Indian state of Sikkim as a photographer, capturing approximately 15,000 color slides, as well as black-and-white photographs, between 1965 and 1979.

== Life and career ==
Kandell graduated from Sarah Lawrence College in 1960. She intended on visiting Tibet after her friend Hope Cooke encouraged her but her parents declined. She initially visited Sikkim in 1965 to attend the coronation ceremony of Hope Cooke, an American woman who married Palden Thondup Namgyal, King of Sikkim. At his request, she started a photograph project to illustrate how he and his wife favoured education and local businesses in Sikkim to benefit its culture.

She is the author or co-author of two books, (with text by Charlotte Salisbury), and a book for children, called Sikkim: The Hidden Kingdom.

Her private collection of Tibetan art was covered in A Shrine for Tibet: The Alice S. Kandell Collection of Tibetan Sacred Art, by Marylin Rhie and Robert Thurman, with photographs by John Bigelow Taylor.

In 2011, she donated a collection of Tibetan art to the Arthur M. Sackler Gallery at the Smithsonian, and about 300 pictures to the Library of Congress.

She is the daughter of Leonard S. Kandell, a developer and investor in Manhattan real estate.

== Gallery ==
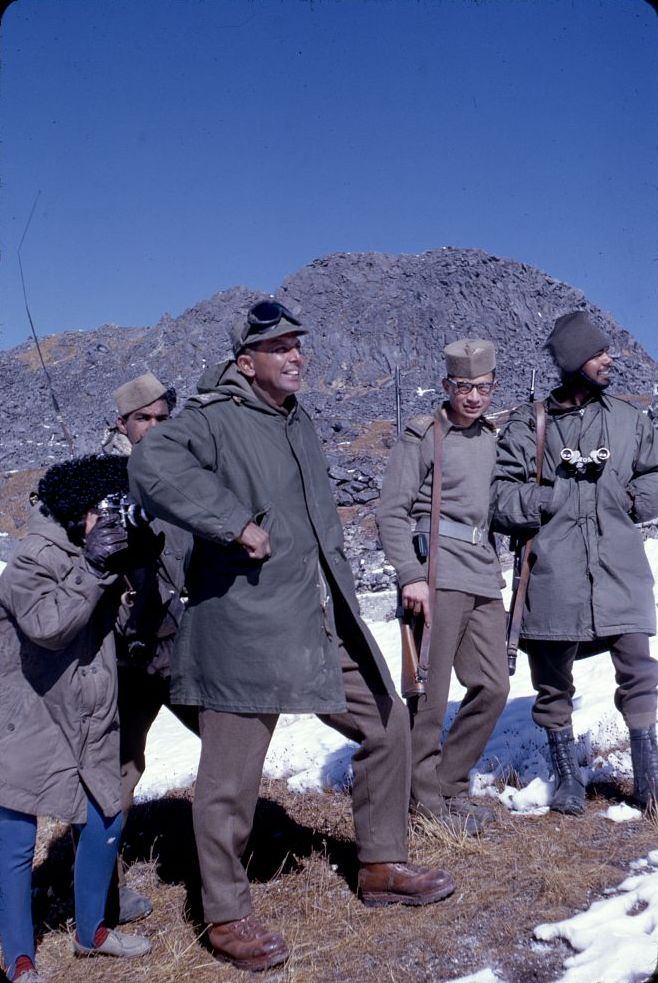
Alice Kandell behind a Sikkimese soldier taking a photograph of a Chinese soldier along the Nathu La Pass, Sikkim

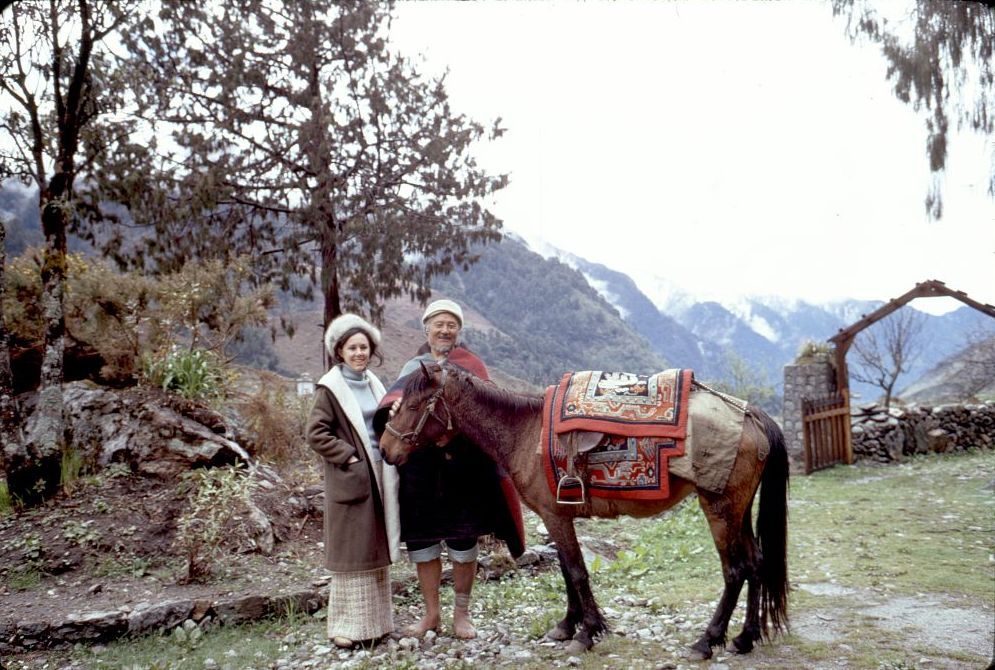
Alice Kandell with villager and horse, Sikkim

=== Images taken by Alice S. Kandell ===
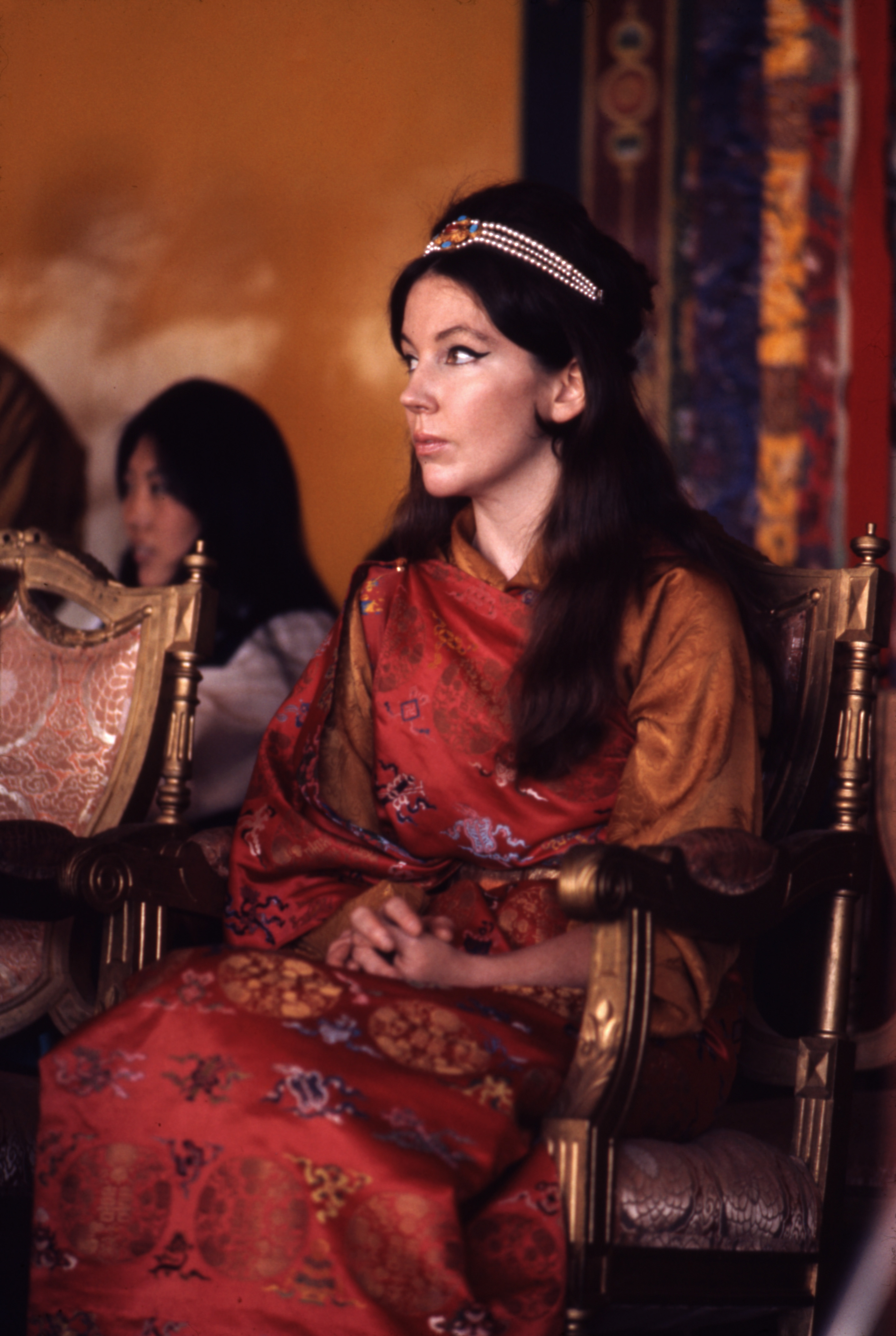
Hope Cooke, Queen of Sikkim

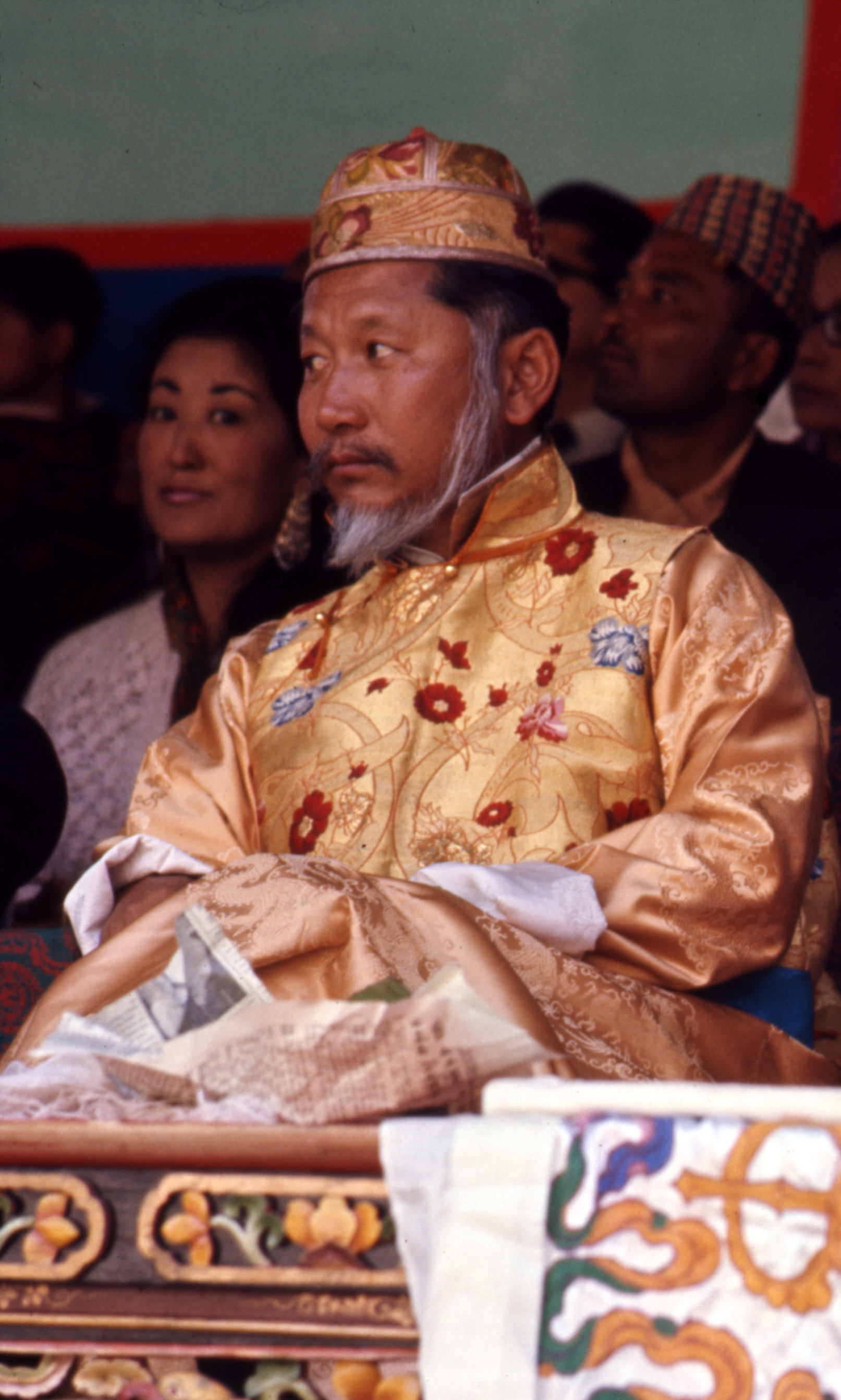
Palden Thondup Namgyal, King of Sikkim

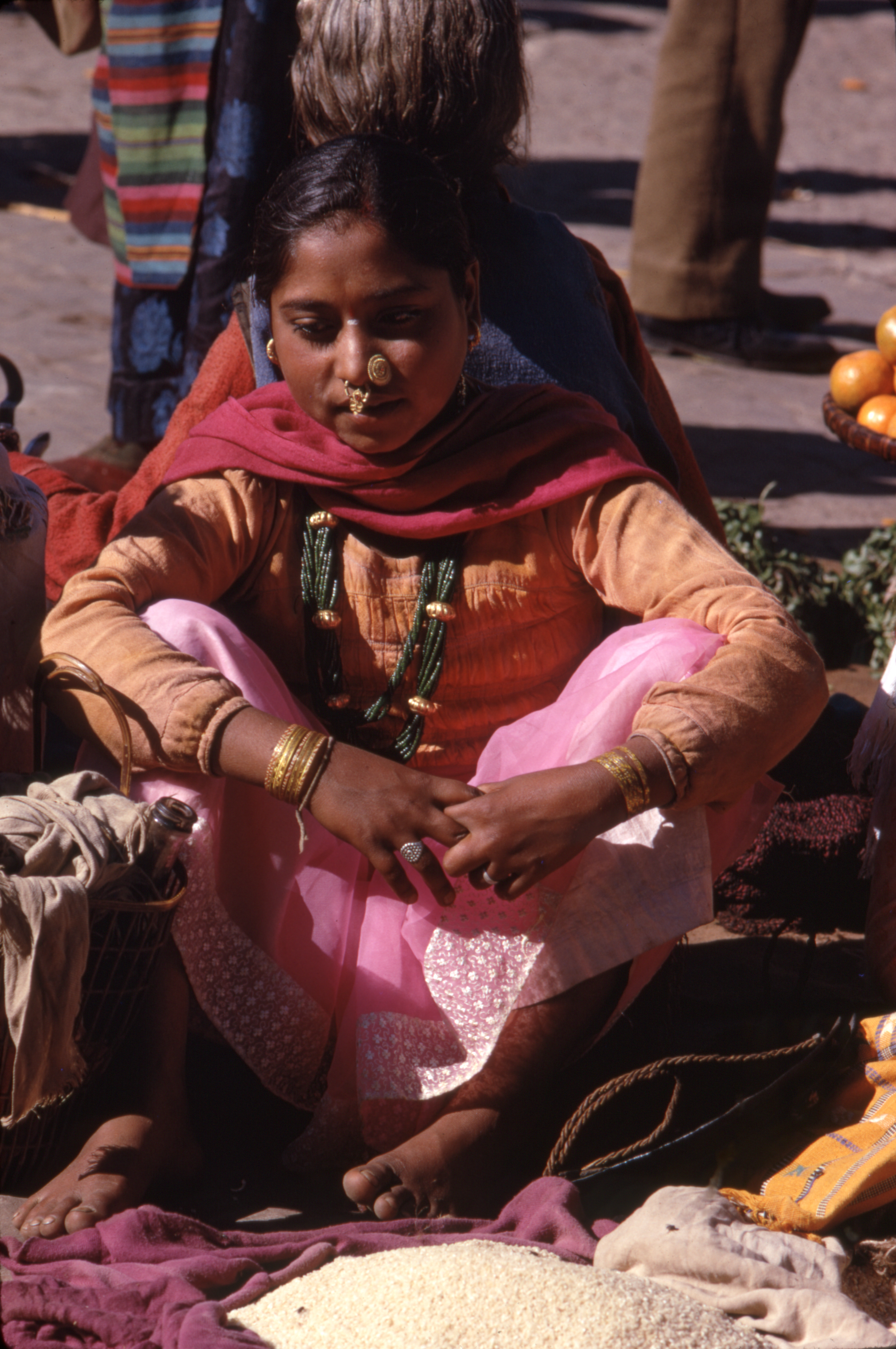
Woman selling rice in Gangtok market, Sikkim

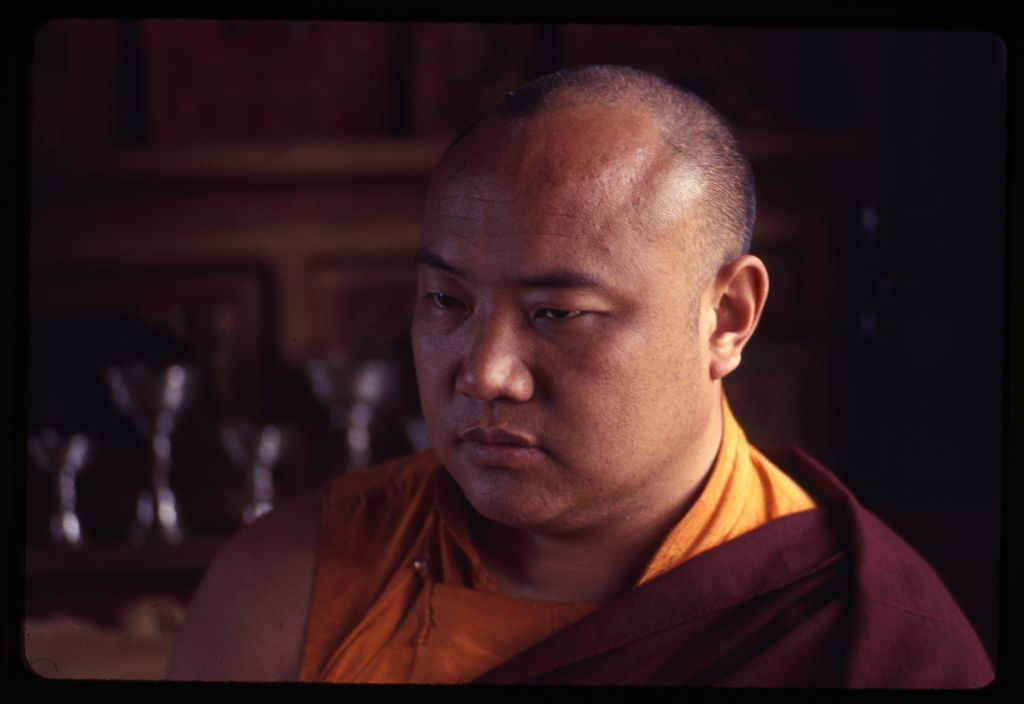
The 16th Karmapa, Rangjung Rigpe Dorje, religious leader of Sikkim

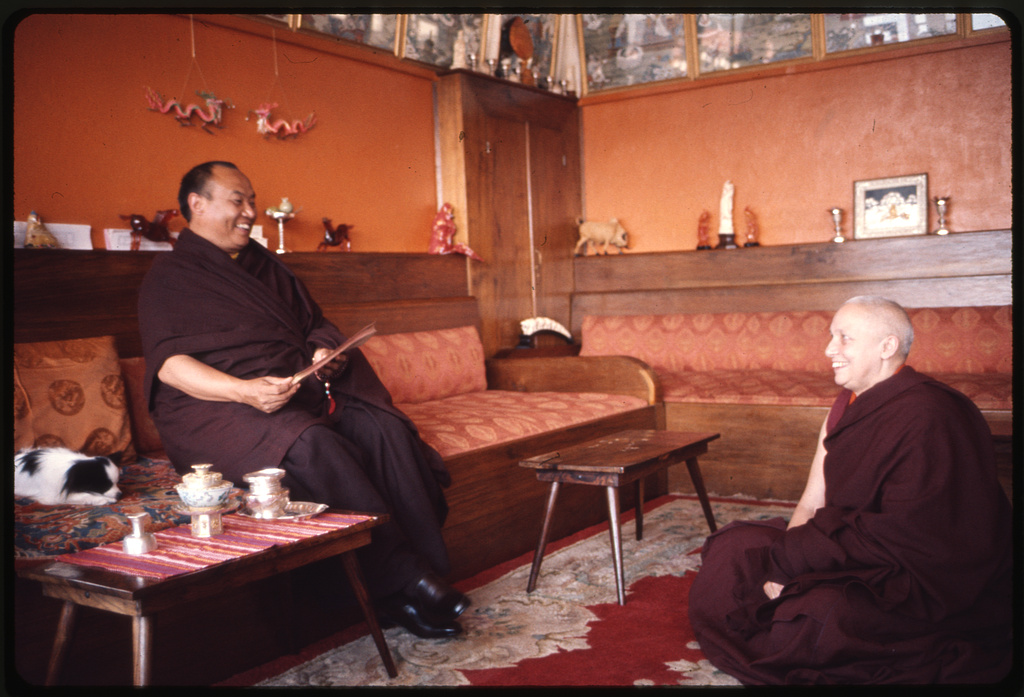
Rangjung Rigpe Dorje, the 16th Karmapa, seated, with a monk, at Rumtek Monastery, Sikkim in 1965.

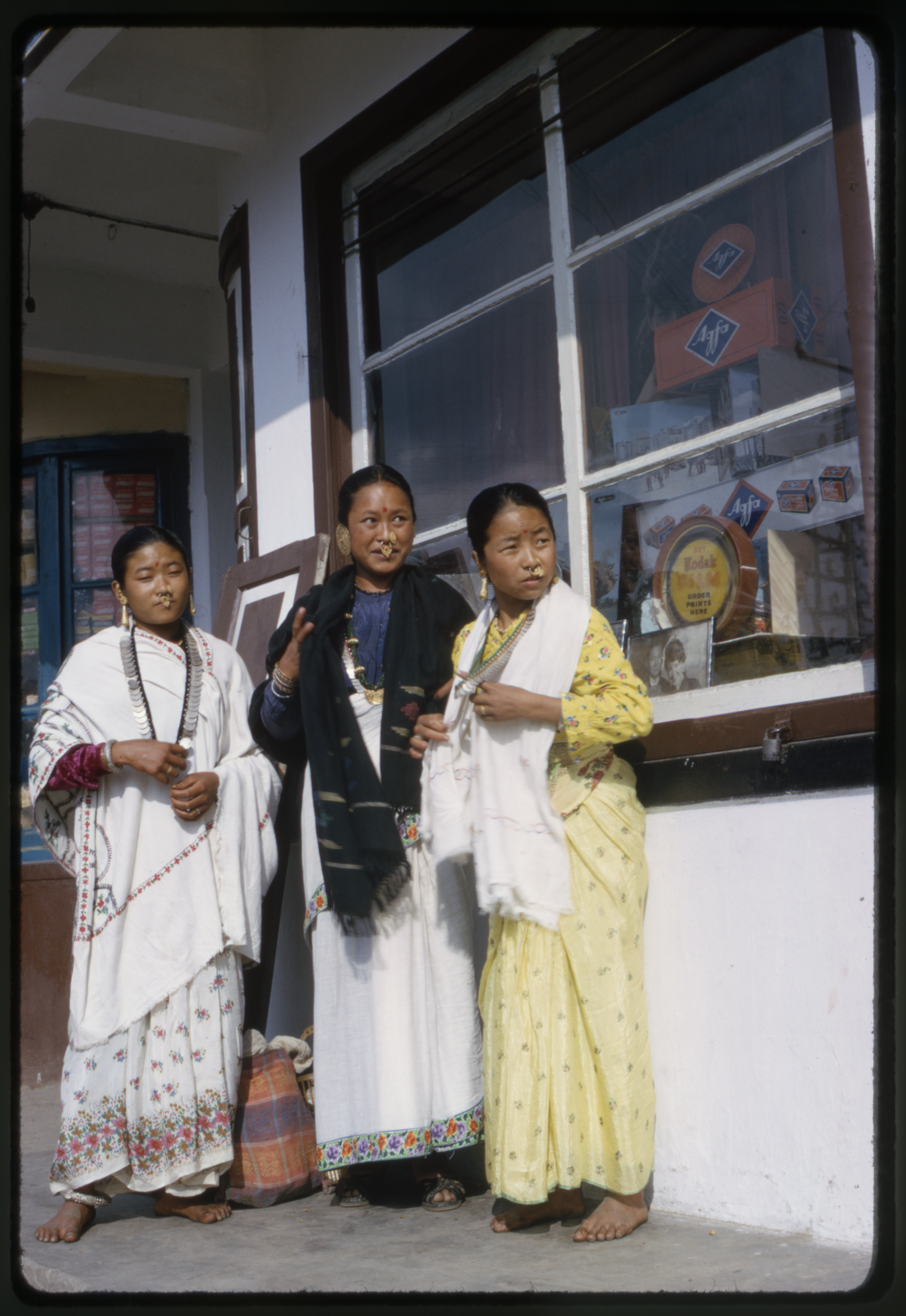
Coronation of King in April 1965. Three Nepalese women standing in front of Tse Ten Tashi's photograph studio, Gangtok, Sikkim.

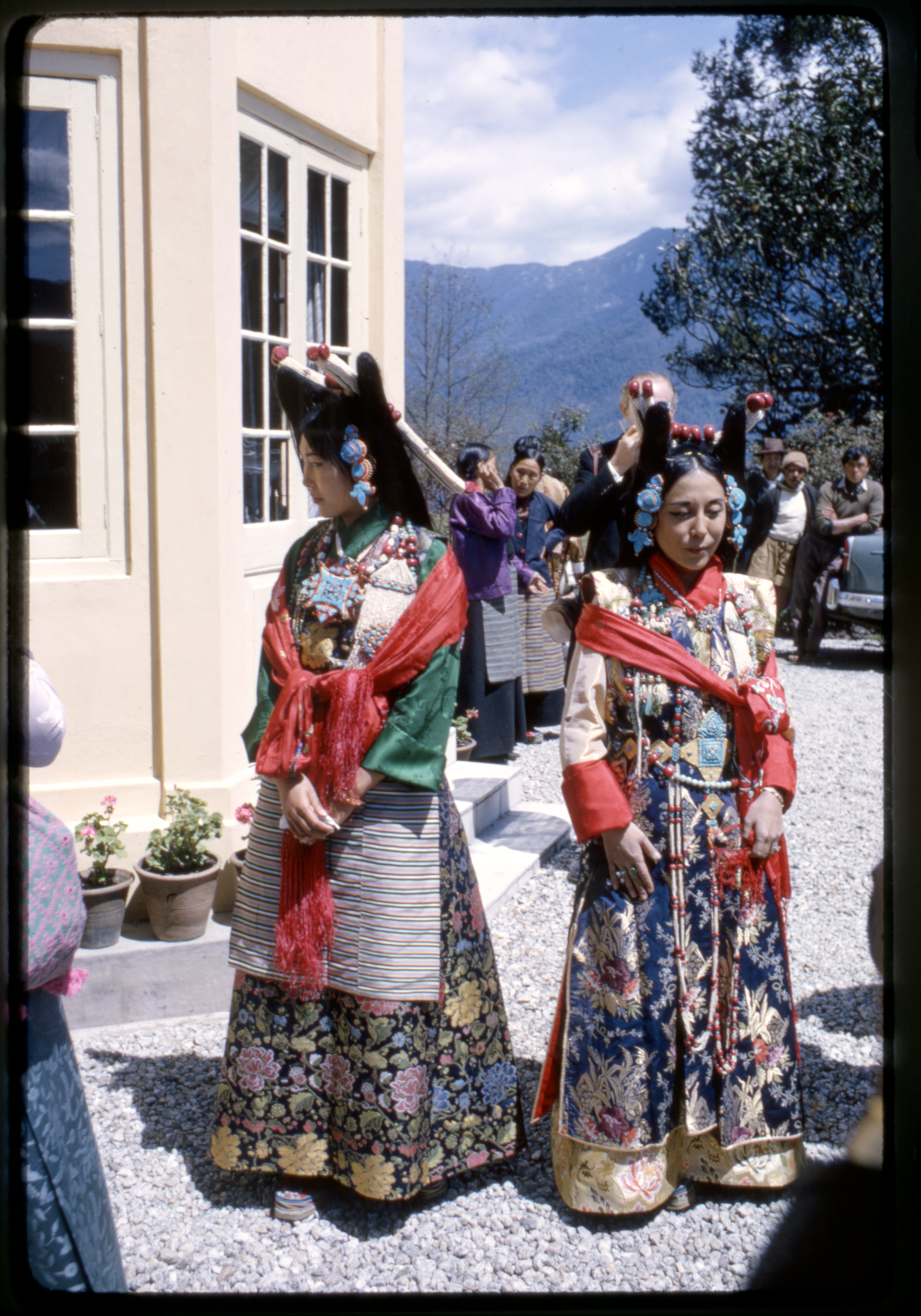
Coronation of King in April 1965. Princess, sister of the King of Sikkim, standing on right, in traditional royal dress, during coronation of King, Gangtok, Sikkim.

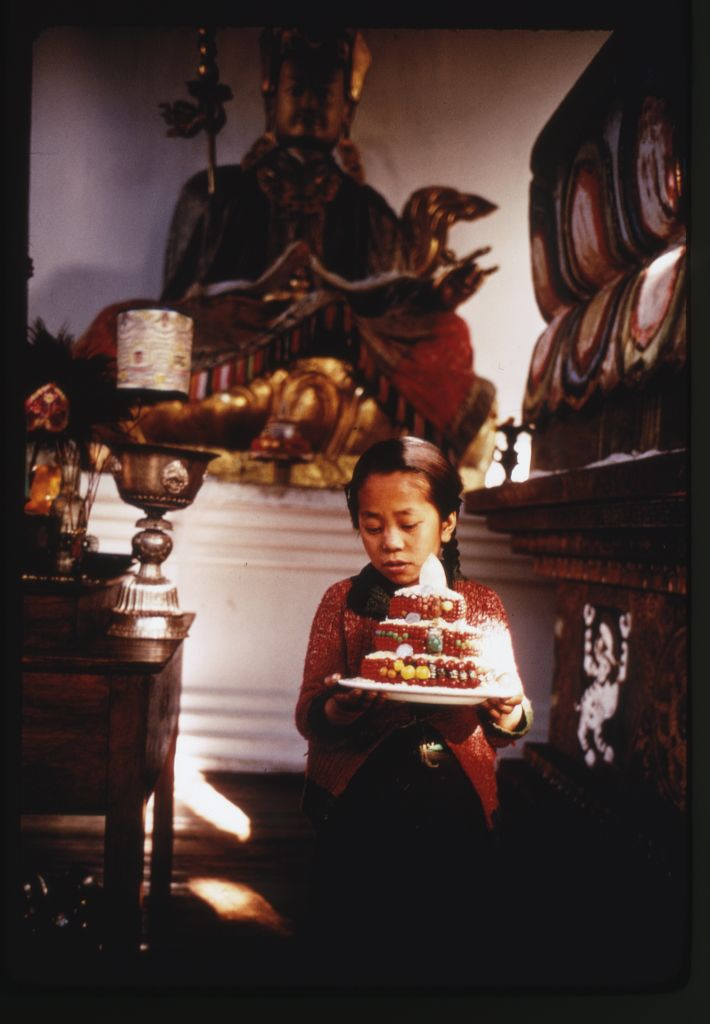
Young girl, Kimu, carrying a birthday cake through the Lachung Monastery, Sikkim February 1969.

=== Collection of Tibetan art ===
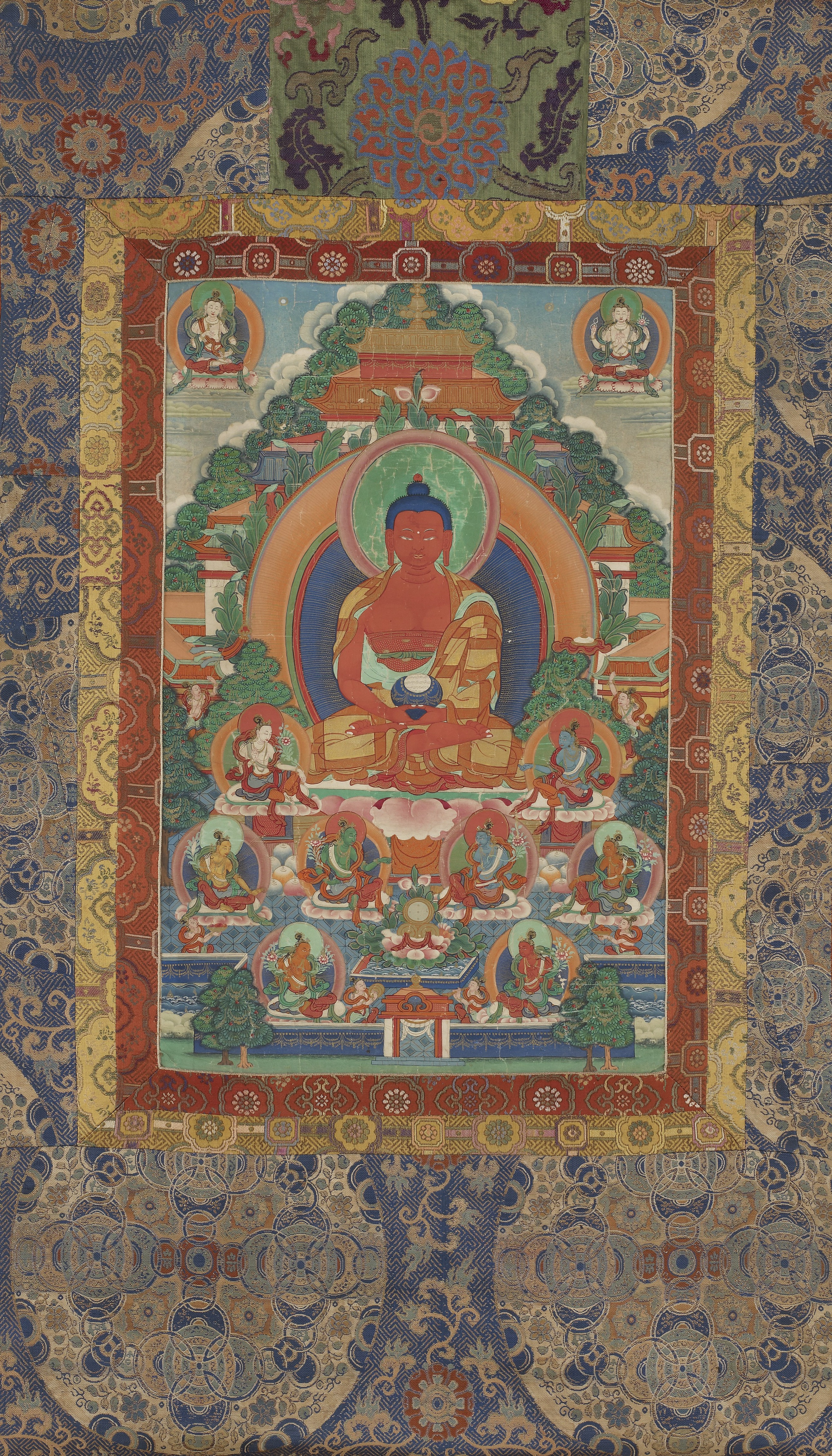
Amitabha in Sukhavati Pure Land

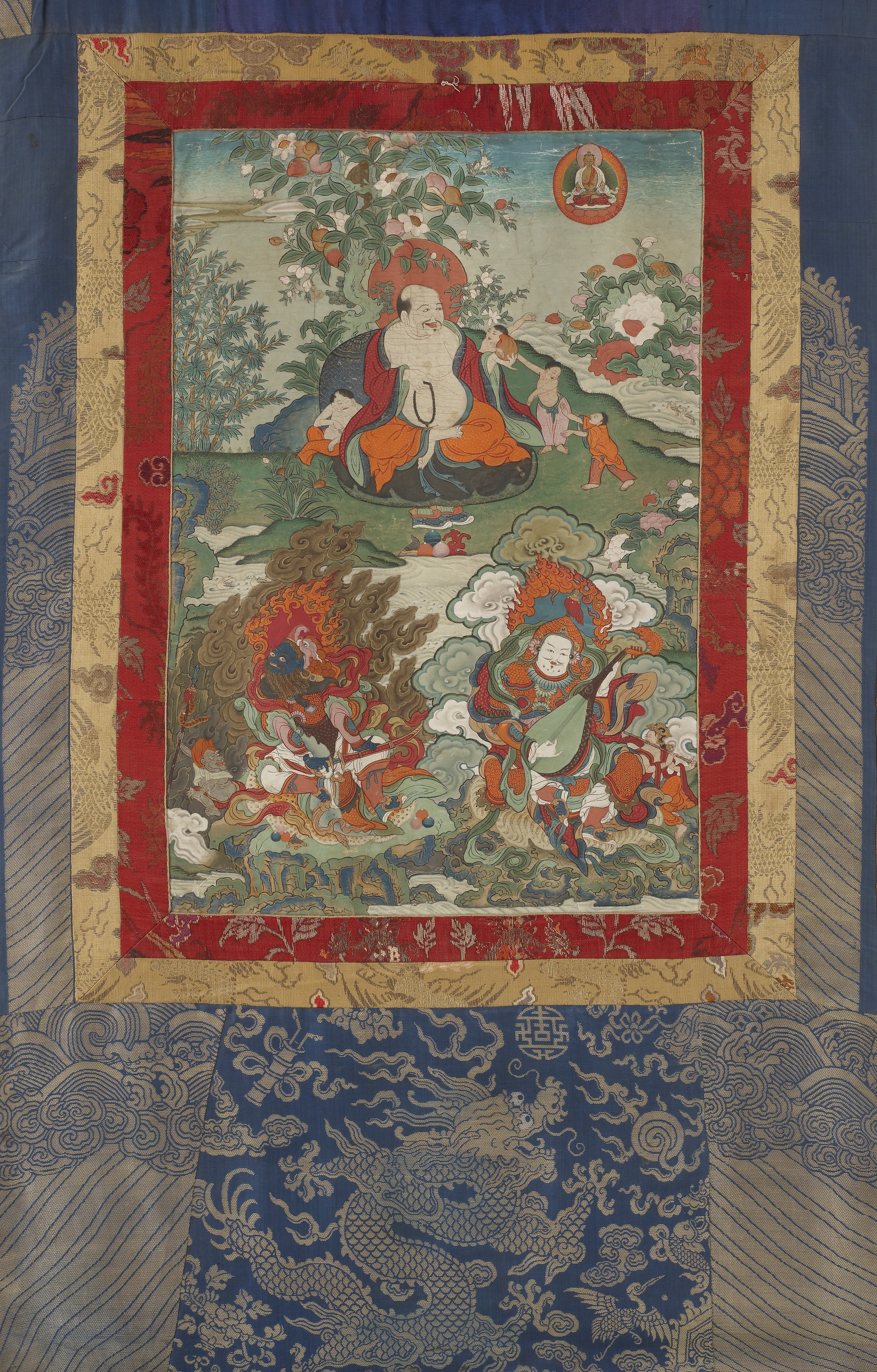
Hva Shang, and Lokapalas Virudhaka and Dhrtarashta

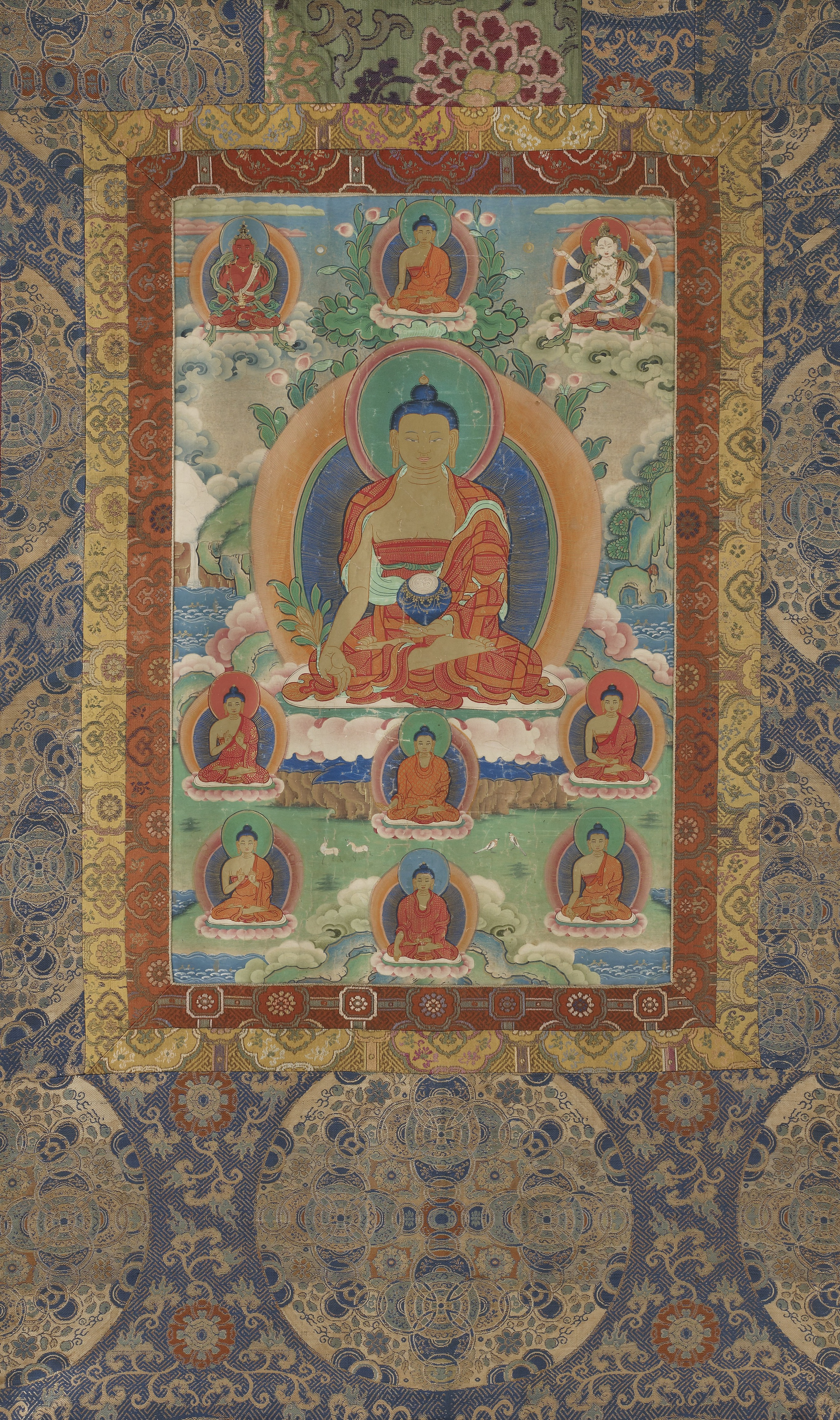
Bhaishajya Guru

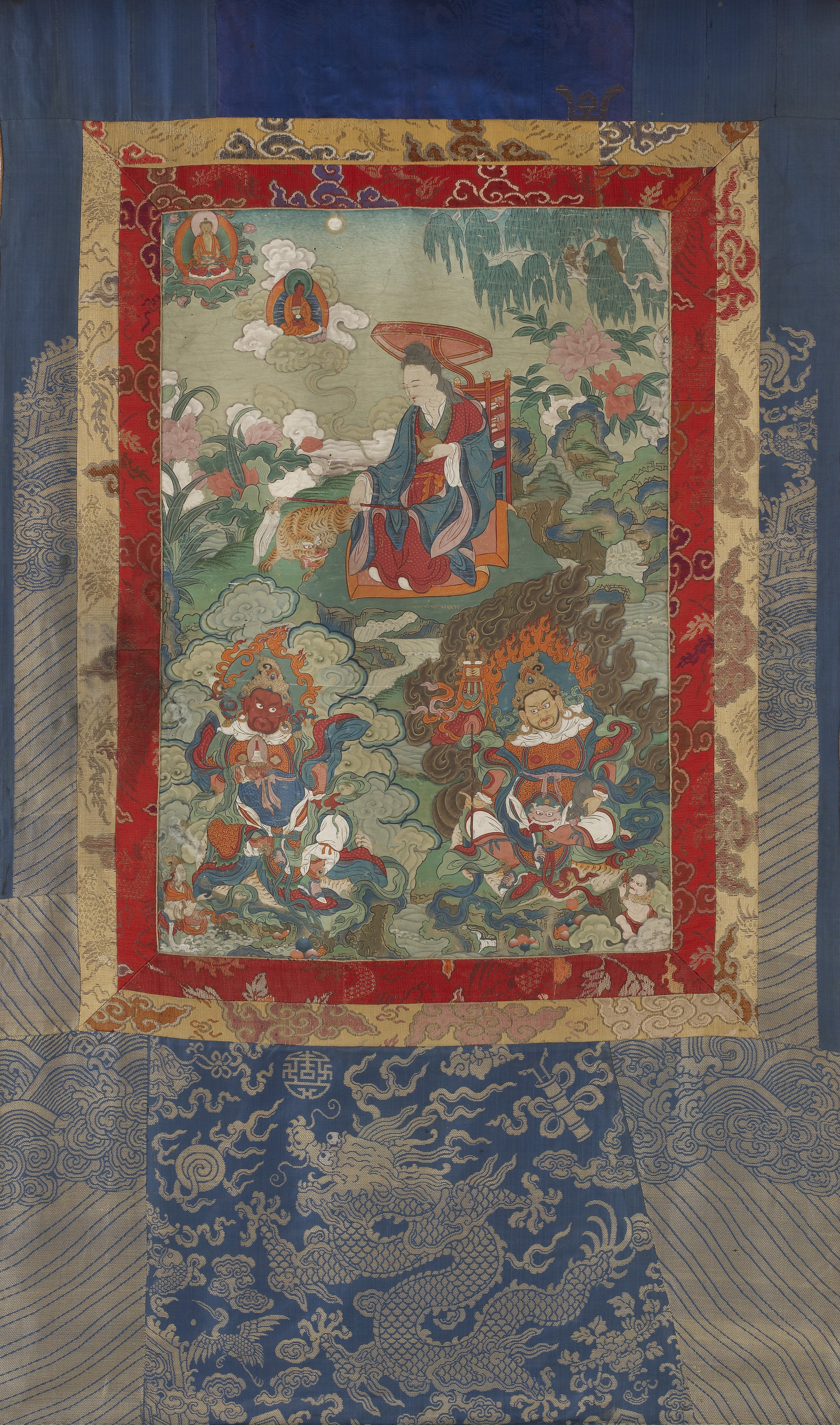
Dharmatala, and Lokapalas Virupaksha and Vaishravana

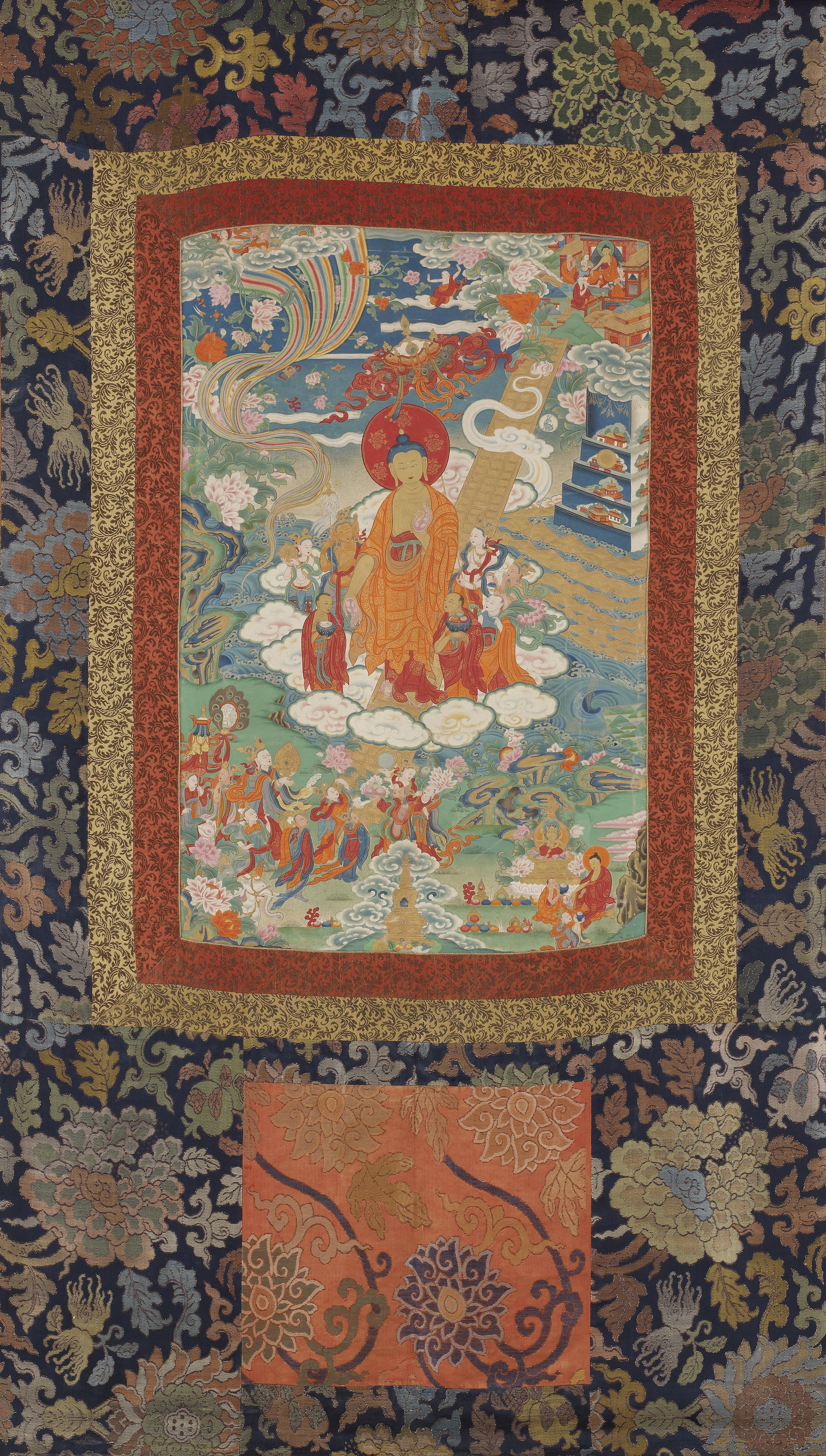
Shakyamuni Descending from the Heaven of the 33 Gods

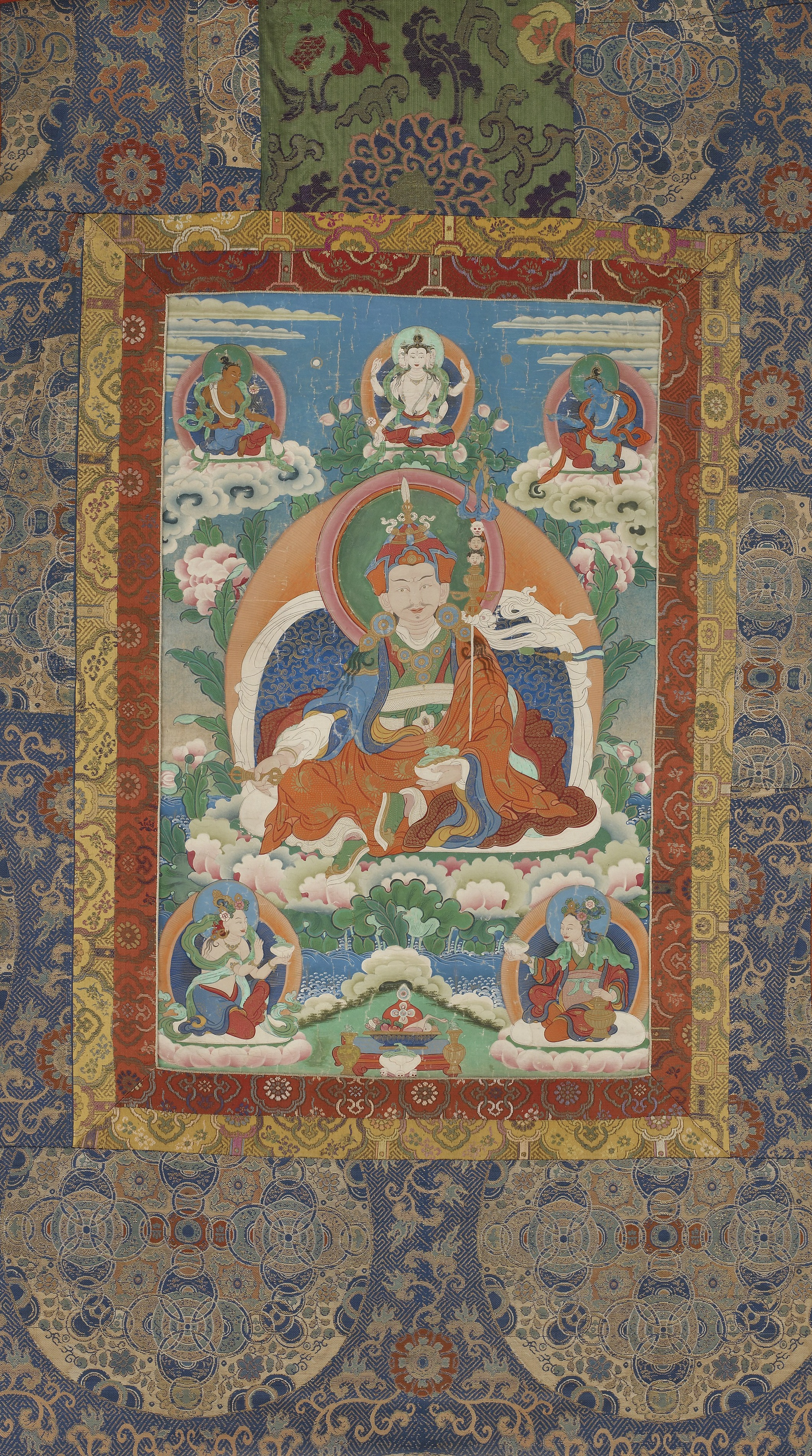
Padma Sambhava

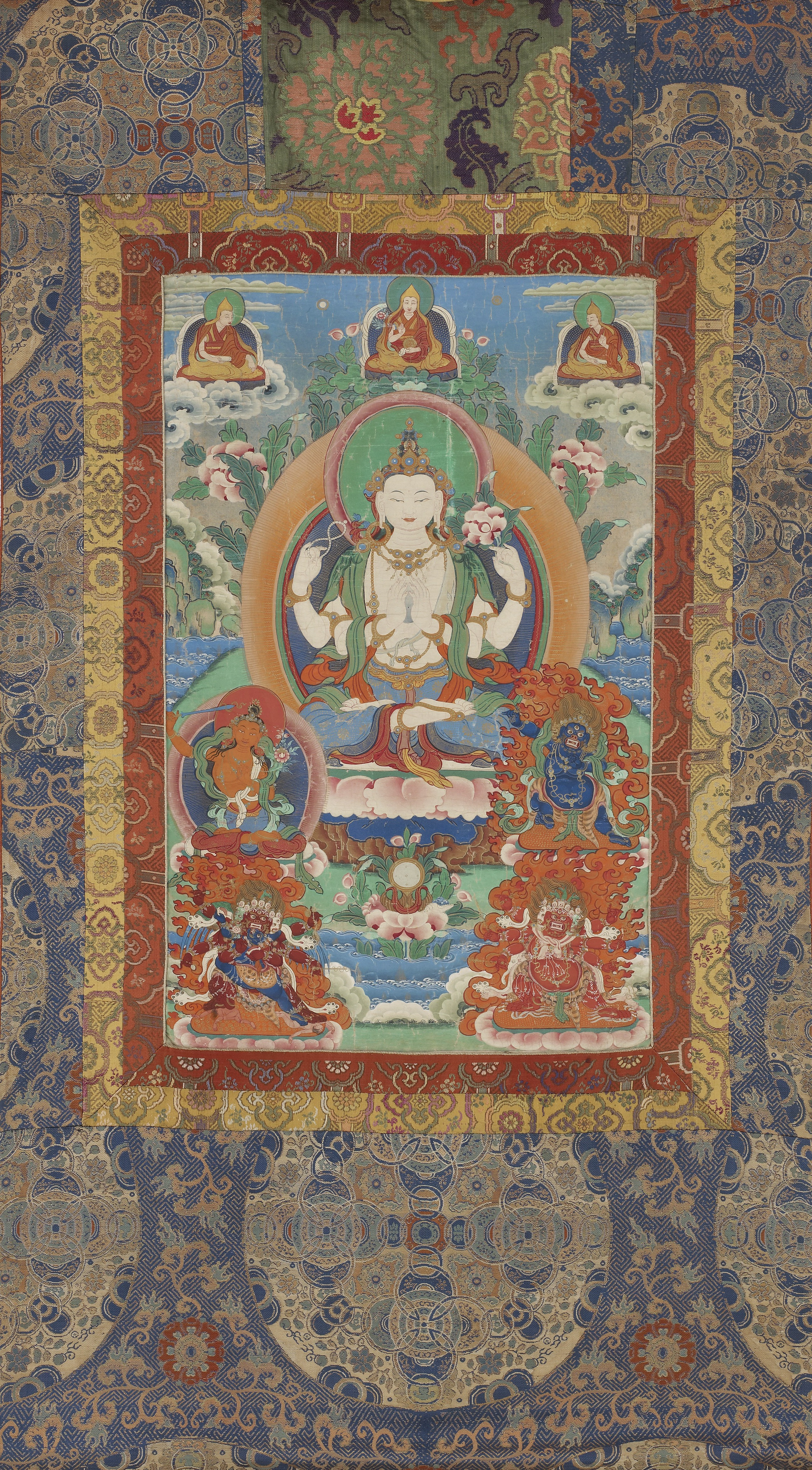
Shadakshari Avalokiteshvara
