= Ed Miller (Scottish folk musician) =

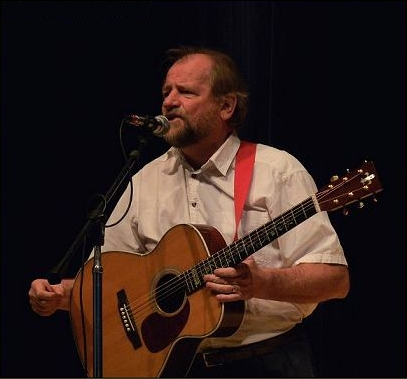
- Miller performing live at Edinboro University of Pennsylvania, July 2009

Background information
- Origin: Edinburgh, Scotland
- Genres: Folk music
- Occupation(s): Musician, songwriter
- Instrument(s): Vocals, guitar
- Years active: 1993-present

Ed Miller is a Scottish folk singer. Born and raised in Edinburgh, Miller attended the University of Edinburgh for his undergraduate degree prior to moving to the United States in 1968 to complete his graduate work in geography and folklore at the University of Texas at Austin. Miller is the host of "Across the Pond" on Austin's Sun Radio. He has worked with Brian McNeill, John Taylor, Scooter Muse, and Jil Chambless, and is a frequent performer at folk music festivals in the United States. Ed lives in Austin with his wife Nora, and has two daughters, Anna and Maggie.

== Discography ==
=== Albums ===
- Scottish Voice (1993)
- Live at the Cactus Cafe (1995)
- At Home with the Exiles (1995)
- The Edinburgh Rambler (1997)
- Lowlander (2000)
- Many's the Fine Tale (2002)
- Generations of Change (2004)
- Never Frae My Mind (2006)
- Lyrics of Gold (2008)
- Come awa wi Me (2011)
- Border Background (2014)
- Follow the Music (2018)
