= Jonathan Taylor (disambiguation) =

Jonathan Taylor (born 1999) is an American football running back.

Jonathan Taylor may also refer to:

== Sports ==
- Jonathan Taylor (alpine skier) (born 1943), British alpine skier

== Others ==
- Jonathan Taylor (Ohio politician) (1796–1848), American lawyer and politician, U.S. Representative from Ohio
- Jonathan Taylor (Wisconsin politician) (fl. 1850), American politician, member of the Wisconsin State Assembly
- Jonathan Taylor (academic administrator) (born 1935), British academic
- Sir Jonathan Taylor (civil servant) (born 1955), former British Treasury official and banker
- Jonathan Taylor (author) (born 1973), British author, poet and academic

== See also ==
- Johnathan Taylor (born 1979), American football defensive end
- Jonathon Taylor (born 1979), New Zealand footballer
- Jonathan Taylor Thomas (born 1981), American actor
- Jonathan Taylor Updegraff (1822–1882), U.S. Representative from Ohio
- Jon Taylor (disambiguation)
- John Taylor (disambiguation)
