= John Taylor (presenter) =

Australian journalist and television presenter

John Taylor began work with the ABC in Queensland in 1996. He is an experienced radio and television journalist with an intimate knowledge of Queensland. John has worked for the ABC in Brisbane, Longreach, Cairns, and the Gold Coast, and has also been based in Sydney and Darwin. He was the ABC's North Australia correspondent, and returned to Australia late last year after four years in Beijing as the ABC's China Correspondent. John has covered all manner of stories including state and national politics, elections, World Trade Organization talks, and droughts, fires, floods, the SARS outbreak in China in 2003, the 2004 Asian tsunami, and the 2005 Kashmir earthquake.

Prior to his appointment in January 2007, he was the ABC's China correspondent. He replaced Lisa Backhouse, who resigned.
