= Bryan Taylor =

Bryan Taylor may refer to:

- John Bryan Taylor (1928–2026), British physicist
- Bryan Taylor (cyclist) (born 1968), English cyclist
- Bryan Taylor (politician) (born 1976), American politician and lawyer from Alabama
- Bryan Taylor (soccer) (born 1975), retired American soccer midfielder

== See also ==
- Brian Taylor (disambiguation)
