= Jock Taylor (disambiguation) =

Jock Taylor (1954–1982) was a Scottish motorcycle sidecar racer.

Jock Taylor may also refer to:

- Jock Taylor (footballer, born 1885) (1885–1916), played for Peterhead, Hull City, New Brompton and Leith Athletic
- Jock Taylor (footballer, born 1909) (1909–1964), played for St Johnstone, Cowdenbeath, Raith Rovers, Bristol City, Halifax Town and Clapton Orient
- Sir Jock Taylor (diplomat) (1924–2002), British diplomat

== See also ==
- John Taylor (disambiguation)
