= Chandos portrait =

Possible portrait of Shakespeare

- Artist: Attributed to John Taylor
- Year: c. 1600–1610
- Medium: Oil on canvas
- Subject: Most probably William Shakespeare
- Dimensions: 55.2 cm × 43.8 cm (21 3/4 in × 17 1/4 in)
- Location: National Portrait Gallery, London
- Accession: NPG 1

The Chandos portrait is an oil painted portrait thought to depict William Shakespeare (1564–1616). Painted between 1600 and 1610, it may have served as the basis for the engraved portrait of Shakespeare used in the First Folio in 1623. It is named after the 3rd Duke of Chandos, who was a former owner. The portrait was given to the National Portrait Gallery, London, on its foundation in 1856, and it was the first portrait to be acquired for its collection.

It has not been determined with certainty which artist painted the portrait, or whether it actually depicts Shakespeare. The attribution and the identification are both conjectures. However, the National Portrait Gallery believes that it is "certainly fairly likely" that the portrait does depict the writer.

== Authorship and provenance ==
The first known reference to the painting is in a note written in 1719 by George Vertue, who stated that it was painted by John Taylor, a respected member of the Painter-Stainers' Company, who may also have been the same John Taylor who acted with the Children of Paul's. Vertue refers to Taylor as an actor and painter and as Shakespeare's "intimate friend". Katherine Duncan-Jones argues that "John Taylor" could have been a misreading of what had originally been "Jo: Taylor"; she suggests that this may refer to the actor Joseph Taylor, who was a protégé of the older Shakespeare.

In 1719, in a note in the margin of a book, George Vertue wrote the name "Richard Burbridge" [sic], then crossed it out. It is thought that Vertue temporarily and mistakenly assigned the painting to Shakespeare's friend Richard Burbage (1567–1619), then crossed it out, and instead wrote that the painting was by "one Taylor".

Vertue also states that before the Duke of Chandos acquired it, the portrait was owned by Shakespeare's possible godson, William Davenant (1606–1668), who, according to the gossip chronicler John Aubrey, claimed to be the playwright's illegitimate son. He also states that it was left to Davenant in Taylor's will and that it was bought by Thomas Betterton from Davenant and then sold to the lawyer Robert Keck, a collector of Shakespeare memorabilia.

After Keck's death in 1719, it passed to his daughter, and was inherited by John Nichol, who married into the Keck family. Nichol's daughter Margaret married James Brydges, 3rd Duke of Chandos. The painting passed through descent within the Chandos title until Richard Temple-Grenville, 2nd Duke of Buckingham and Chandos, sold it to the Earl of Ellesmere in 1848. Ellesmere donated it in 1856 to the National Portrait Gallery.

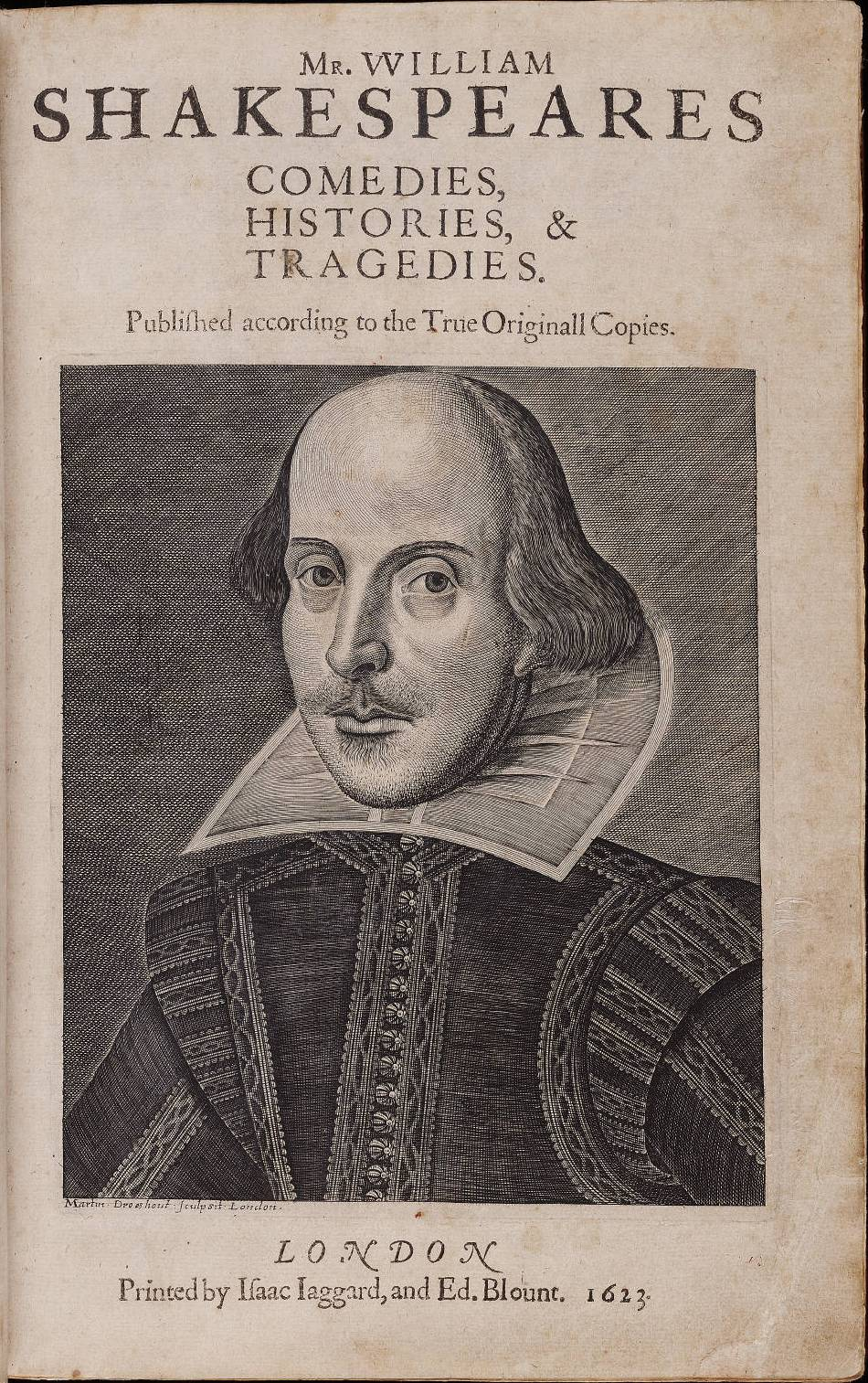
Engraved portrait of Shakespeare by Martin Droeshout, on the title page of the first publication of his works, the First Folio, shows distinct similarities when compared to the oil painting.

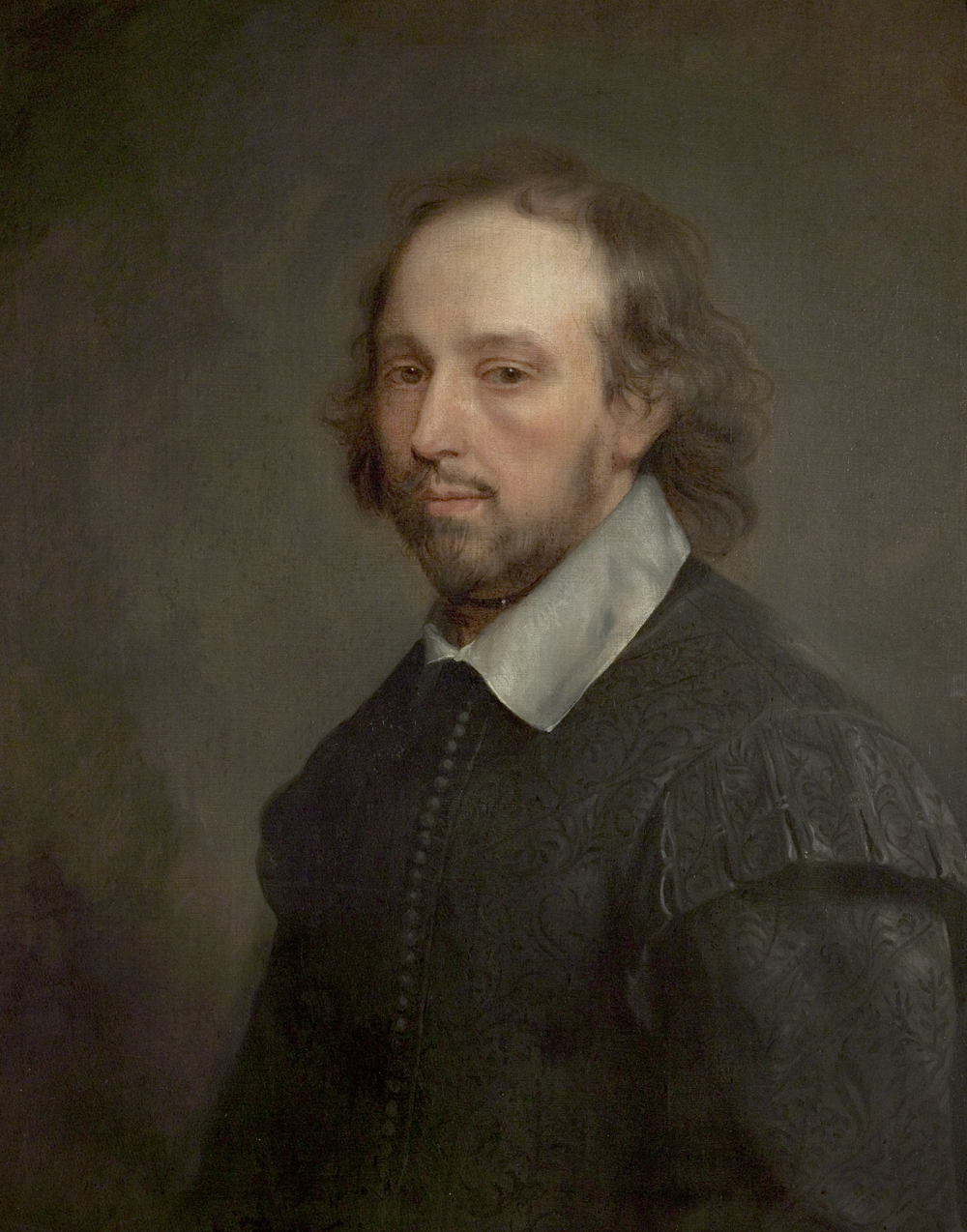
The "Soest Portrait" of Shakespeare, painted c. 1667

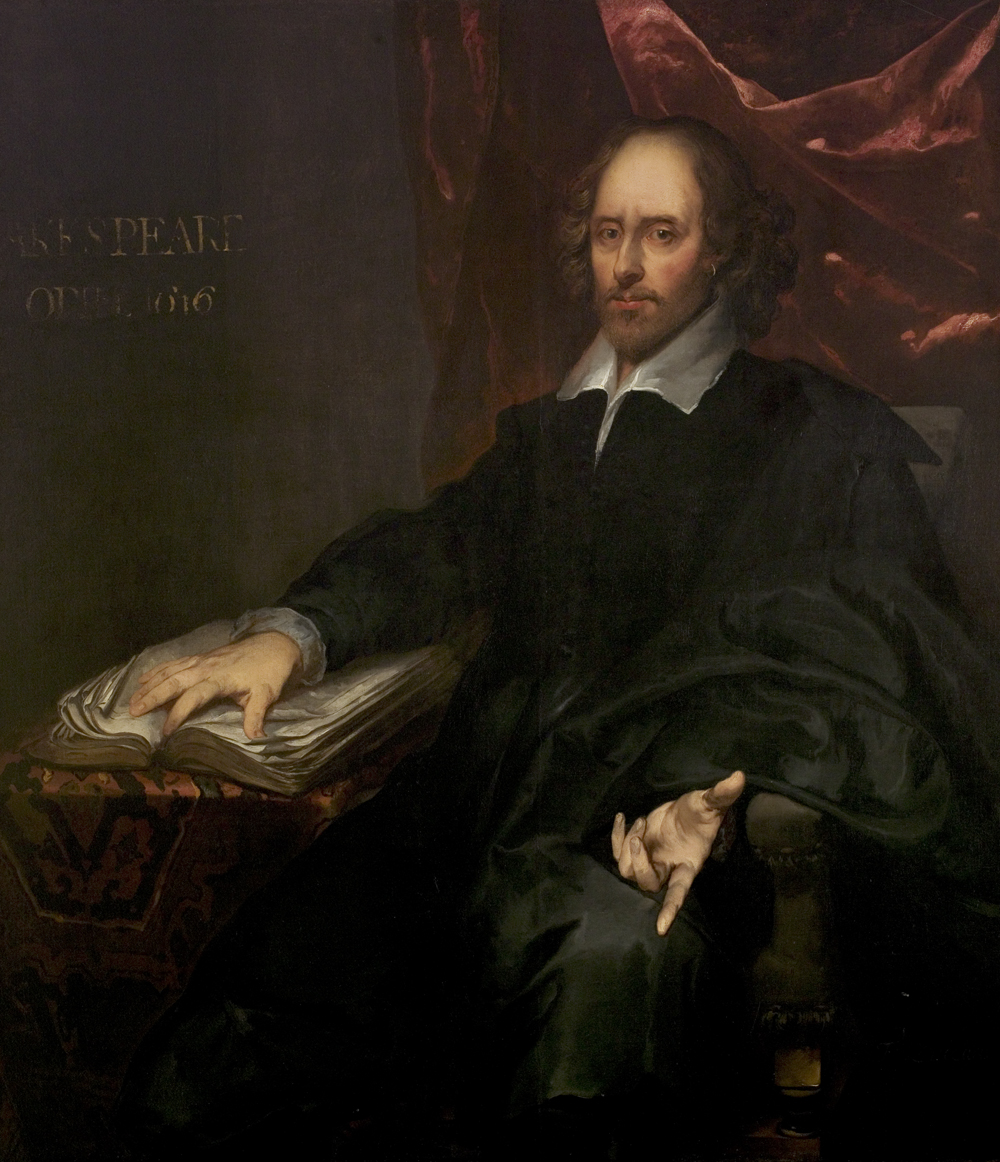
The "Chesterfield Portrait" of Shakespeare, painted c. 1679

== Scholarly views ==
Many purported portraits of Shakespeare exist. An image that is definitively identifiable as a depiction of the playwright is the engraving in the posthumously published First Folio of 1623. It was created by Martin Droeshout and was probably commissioned by Shakespeare's friends and family. It is considered likely that the Droeshout engraving is a reasonably accurate likeness of Shakespeare because of its acceptance by these close associates and because contemporaries such as Ben Jonson praised it at the time of the publication. Since the man in the Chandos portrait resembles the one in the Droeshout engraving, the similarity lends an indirect legitimacy to the oil painting. Further, the Chandos portrait was the inspiration for two posthumous portraits of Shakespeare, one by Gerard Soest and another, grander one, known as the "Chesterfield portrait" after a former owner of that painting. These were probably painted in the 1660s or 1670s, within living memory of Shakespeare. The Chesterfield portrait is held by the Shakespeare Birthplace Trust in Stratford-upon-Avon.

In 2006, art historian Tarnya Cooper of the National Portrait Gallery completed a three-and-a-half-year study of purported portraits of Shakespeare and concluded that the Chandos portrait was most likely a representation of Shakespeare. Cooper points to the earring and the loose shirt-ties of the sitter, which were emblematic of poets (the poet John Donne and Shakespeare's patron the Earl of Pembroke sported similar fashions). However, she readily acknowledges that the painting's authenticity cannot be proven.

Cooper also notes that the painting has been badly damaged by over-cleaning and retouching. Some parts are abraded, while others have been slightly altered. The hair has been extended and the beard is longer and more pointed than when originally painted.

== Copies ==
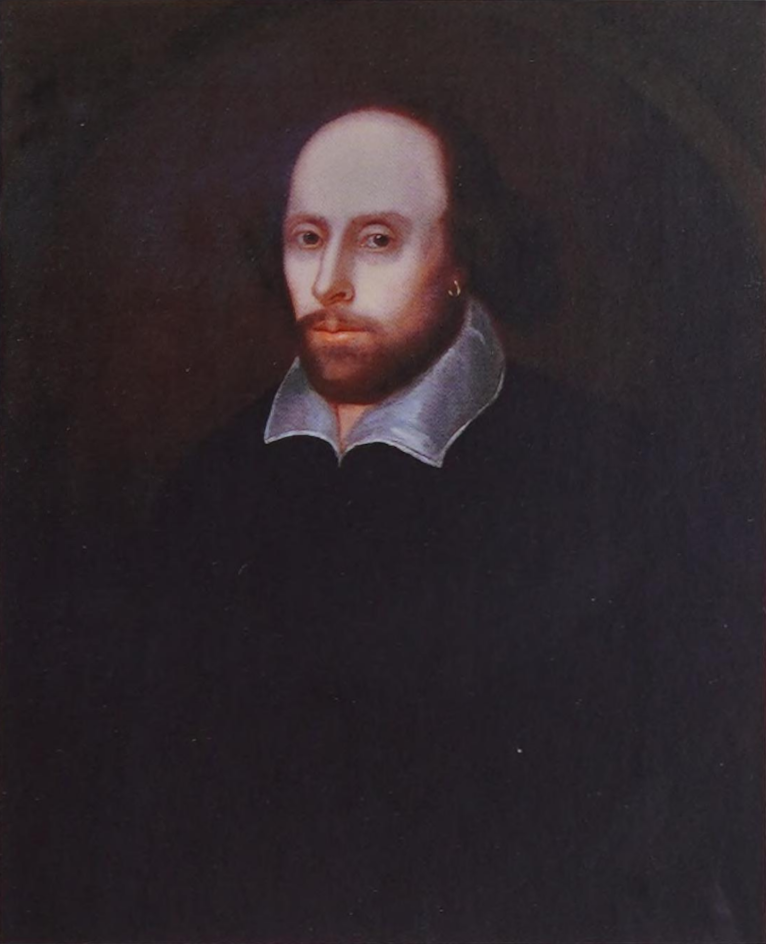
An anonymous copy of the portrait from c. 1670, which may give a clearer idea of the original appearance of the beard

In addition to the Chesterfield portrait, a copy was made at least as early as 1689 by an unknown artist. Many 18th century images used it as a model for portrayals of Shakespeare.

The painting was engraved by Gerard Vandergucht for Nicholas Rowe's 1709 edition of Shakespeare's works. Another print was made by Jacobus Houbraken in 1747.

== Ethnic interpretations ==
Because there are a lack of sources regarding Shakespeare's appearance—no written contemporary descriptions of him are known to exist—scholars have relied on the painting over the centuries to offer conflicting views, some based on phrenology, of Shakespeare's ethnicity. George Steevens said that the picture gave Shakespeare "the complexion of a Jew, or rather that of a chimney sweeper in the jaundice". According to Ben Macintyre, "Some Victorians recoiled at the idea that the Chandos portrait represented Shakespeare. One critic, J. Hain Friswell, insisted 'one cannot readily imagine our essentially English Shakespeare to have been a dark, heavy man, with a foreign expression'." Friswell agreed with Steevens that the portrait had "a decidedly Jewish physiognomy" adding that it displayed "a somewhat lubricious mouth, red-edged eyes" and "wanton lips, with a coarse expression." According to Ernest Jones, the portrait convinced Sigmund Freud that Shakespeare was French: "He insisted that his countenance could not be that of an Anglo-Saxon but must be French, and he suggested that the name was a corruption of Jacques Pierre."
