= John Taylor (volleyball) =

American volleyball player (born 1944)

John Taylor (born May 30, 1944) is an American former volleyball player who competed in the 1964 Summer Olympics.
