= John Taylor (footballer, born 1928) =

English footballer

Personal information
- Full name: John James Taylor
- Date of birth: 12 October 1928
- Place of birth: Manchester, England
- Date of death: February 2016 (aged 87)
- Place of death: Manchester, England
- Position: Right winger

Senior career*
Years	Team	Apps	(Gls)
1949–1952	Blackpool	0	(0)
1952–1953	Accrington Stanley	16	(0)
- Stalybridge Celtic
Total		16	(0)
- * Club domestic league appearances and goals

John James Taylor (12 October 1928 – February 2016) was an English professional footballer who played as a right winger.

== Career ==
Born in Manchester, Taylor played for Blackpool, Accrington Stanley and Stalybridge Celtic.
