= John Taylor (footballer, born 1935) =

English footballer

Personal information
- Full name: John Keith Taylor
- Date of birth: 7 September 1935
- Place of birth: Bradford, England
- Position: Centre forward

Senior career*
Years	Team	Apps	(Gls)
1956	Bradford City	1	(0)
- Bradford (Park Avenue)
Total		1	(0)
- * Club domestic league appearances and goals

John Keith Taylor (born 7 September 1935) was an English footballer who played as a centre forward.

== Career ==
Born in Bradford, Taylor signed for Bradford City from 'minor football' in February 1956. He made 1 league appearance for the club, before being released later in 1956. He later played for Bradford (Park Avenue).

== Sources ==
- Frost, Terry (1988). Bradford City A Complete Record 1903-1988. Breedon Books Sport. ISBN 0-907969-38-0.
