= John Taylor (cricketer, born 1937) =

English cricketer

John Taylor (born 9 June 1937) is an English former cricketer. He was a right-handed batsman and wicket-keeper who played for Essex and Marylebone Cricket Club. He was born in West Ham.

Taylor's first representative cricket match came in a Royal Air Force XI against Yorkshire during the 1957 season, while he played his debut Second XI Championship match against Middlesex Second XI in 1959. A regular in the Second XI side during his first season, his debut first-class match came during 1960, in a match against Oxford University. His debut in the County Championship came just two months later, in a defeat to Derbyshire. He played four further County Championship matches during the season, as the team finished in sixth place in the County Championship.

Taylor featured occasionally during the following season, achieving both of his career half-centuries, including a career-high 86 against Somerset. Taylor's final County Championship appearance came towards the end of July 1961, in a match in which he finished the second innings with a duck. Essex finished seventh in the table, a slight decline on the previous year's performance, but Taylor was out of the team from then on.

Taylor made one further first-class appearance, just a day after his thirtieth birthday, playing for Marylebone Cricket Club against Cambridge University, a full six years after his final County Championship appearance.
