= John Taylor (footballer, born 1926) =

English footballer

Personal information
- Date of birth: 10 July 1926
- Place of birth: Durham, England
- Position: Inside forward

Senior career*
Years	Team	Apps	(Gls)
- Bishop Auckland
- Leytonstone
1948–1949	Crystal Palace	1	(0)
- Dartford
Total		1	(0)
- * Club domestic league appearances and goals

John Taylor (born 10 July 1926) was an English amateur footballer who played as an inside forward.

== Career ==
Born in Durham, Taylor played for Bishop Auckland, Leytonstone, Crystal Palace and Dartford.
