= John Taylor (cricketer, born 1819) =

English cricketer and clergyman

Personal information
- Full name: John Marratt Taylor
- Born: 1819; Sunninghill, Berkshire, England
- Died: 1911 (aged 91/92); High Wycombe, Buckinghamshire, England
- Batting: Unknown
- Bowling: Unknown

Domestic team information
- Years: Team
- 1844: Cambridge University

Career statistics
Competition	First-class
Matches	2
Runs scored	29
Batting average	9.66
100s/50s	–/–
Top score	15*
Balls bowled	154
Wickets	2
Bowling average	?
5 wickets in innings	–
10 wickets in match	–
Best bowling	1/?
Catches/stumpings	1/–
- Source: Cricinfo, 13 January 2022

John Marratt Taylor (1819–1911) was an English first-class cricketer and clergyman.

The son of John Taylor senior, he was born at Sunninghill in 1819. After receiving a private education, he went up to Magdalene College, Cambridge. While studying at Cambridge, he played two first-class cricket matches for Cambridge University Cricket Club at Parker's Piece in 1844, against the Marylebone Cricket Club and Cambridge Town and County Club. He scored 29 runs with a highest score of 15 not out, in addition to taking 2 wickets.

After graduating from Cambridge, he was ordained into the Church of England as a deacon at Chester Cathedral in 1845, before becoming a priest in 1846. He later became an assistant master at Ipswich School, an appointment he held in 1859 and 1860. From there he moved to the West Country, where he became curate of Cannington from 1860 to 1865. From there he was appointed curate at Burton in Dorset until 1868, before becoming curate at Walditch until 1870. Taylor moved to the home counties in 1870, where he spent 30 years as vicar of Seer Green in Buckinghamshire. In retirement he remained in Buckinghamshire at Jordans, later dying at High Wycombe in 1911.
