= John Taylor (19th-century Iowa politician) =

American Democratic Party politician from Iowa

Member of the Iowa House of Representatives
- In office 1852–1854
- Constituency: District 29

Member of the Iowa House of Representatives
- In office 1860–1862
- Constituency: District 38

Probate Judge of Jones County
- In office 1843–1846

Personal details
- Born: February 16, 1808 Rockingham County, New Hampshire, U.S.
- Died: December 3, 1886 (aged 78)
- Party: Democratic Party
- Spouse: Elizabeth Graffort

John Taylor (February 16, 1808 – December 3, 1886) was an American judge and politician.

== Early life ==
John Taylor was born on February 16, 1808, and raised by his parents David Taylor and Martha McNeil in Rockingham County, New Hampshire. Aged 17, Taylor moved to New York, living in Essex County for two years, as well as Greene County and later Albany County. By 1834, Taylor had settled in Cuyahoga County, Ohio, where he remained until 1836. Taylor subsequently lived in Milwaukee for one year, before moving to Louisiana. He traveled north to Iowa in 1838, and lived in Dubuque. In 1841, Taylor acquired land near Cascade.

== Political career ==
Taylor won a three-year term as probate judge of Jones County in October 1843. The next year, he represented Jones County at the Iowa Constitutional Convention. In April 1845, Taylor was elected to the Iowa Territorial Legislature by constituents in Cedar, Linn, and Jones Counties. In 1847, the territorial legislature named Taylor to a commission tasked with locating a permanent seat for the government. After Iowa attained statehood, Taylor served non-consecutive terms as a member of the Iowa House of Representatives for Jones County, from 1852 to 1854 numbered district 29, and from 1860 to 1862 numbered district 38. Throughout his political career, Taylor was affiliated with the Democratic Party, although he lived and repeatedly won elections in an area dominated by the Republican Party.

== Personal life ==
John Taylor married Elizabeth Graffort of Kentucky on December 25, 1844, in Dubuque. He died on December 3, 1886.
