= John Taylor (cricketer, born 1850) =

English cricketer

John Taylor (2 April 1850 – 27 May 1924) was an English first-class cricketer, who played nine first-class matches for Yorkshire County Cricket Club in 1880 and 1881. He had made his first-class debut for the North of England against the South of England in 1875.

Born in Pudsey, Yorkshire, England, Taylor played for Batley Victoria C.C., captaining them in the 1870s. During the 1880s he was engaged by Armley C.C. A right-handed batsman, Taylor scored 110 first-class runs at 7.85, with a best score of 44. He took four catches in the field, but his right arm, round arm medium bowling was not called upon.

Taylor worked as a clerk and travelling salesman, and died in Boston Spa, Yorkshire, in May 1924.
