= Lisa Backhouse =

Australian television journalist

Lisa Backhouse is a female Australian television journalist for the Nine Network.

== Career ==
Backhouse began her television career as a cadet at the Australian Broadcasting Corporation (ABC) in Brisbane in 1988. She soon relocated to Townsville, remaining there for nearly two years. She then moved to Canberra, where she reported on national politics and events.

Backhouse returned to ABC in 1998, relocating to Brisbane to anchor the ABC weekend news. She retained this position until 2006, and in 2004 also began hosting the ABC program Stateline.

Backhouse left ABC in 2006, moving to the position of relief presenter on Nine News Queensland. As of January 2010 she remains in that post. Over the 2009-2010 summer, she filled in as Nine News Queensland Weekend anchor. She regularly fills in on the weekend news for news presenter Heather Foord or on the weather and she is also a senior reporter

== Health issue ==
Backhouse departed the ABC under difficult circumstances. Diagnosed with breast cancer, and upset at what she believed was ABC Management's lack of concern over a possible cancer cluster at the Brisbane studios, she chose her health and departed in late 2006.

The ABC has since abandoned its Brisbane studios as a result of the cancer cases.
