= John Taylor (Scottish fiddler) =

Scottish fiddler and composer

John Taylor is a Scottish fiddler and composer from Buckie in Scotland and a past winner of the Niel Gow award for Scottish fiddling. He lives in California and leads the band Hamewith. He was part of the former band Emerald that was based in Northern California in the 1980s and 1990s. He appears as a musician in the wedding scene from the movie So I Married an Axe Murderer.

Taylor is well known in Scottish country dance circles having appeared in many parts of the world including the US, Canada, New Zealand and various parts of the UK. He has recorded specific country dance music CDs with Andrew Imbrie – Steppin' Out and Live.

He has often appeared with Texas-based folk singer Ed Miller and features on many of Miller's CDs.; in a review of their first collaboration, The Edinburgh Rambler, the Austin American-Statesman called Taylor "brilliant".

His 2001 debut CD, After the Dance, was produced by Brian McNeill. His second album, The Road Ahead, was also produced by McNeill. Taylor is a frequent visitor to folk-music events in Texas where he is highly regarded and known for his large repertoire, and plays at many festivals across America each year.

== Discography ==
=== Albums ===
- After the Dance (2001) Hamilton House
- The Road Ahead (2003)

With Andrew Imbrie

- Steppin' Out (1988)
- Live (1996)

On Ed Miller albums

- Lowlander (2000) Wellfield Music
- Manys The Fine Tale (2002) Wellfield Music
