= John Taylor (by 1533–1568) =

John Taylor (by 1533-1568), of Burton-upon-Trent, Staffordshire, was an English Member of Parliament (MP).

He was a Member of the Parliament of England for Lichfield in April 1554.
