= Jack Taylor (skier) =

American freestyle skier

Jack Taylor (1948–2008) was a pioneer freestyle skier and 3x consecutive world mogul champion, having won in 1975, 1976, and 1977.

== Education ==
Jack was a 1966 graduate of Portsmouth High School in Portsmouth, New Hampshire, and a 1970 graduate of the University of New Hampshire.
