= John Taylor (Welsh footballer) =

Welsh footballer

Personal information
- Date of birth: 26 January 1874
- Place of birth: Shotton, Wales
- Date of death: March 1913 (aged 39)
- Place of death: Queensferry, Wales

Youth career
- 1890-1893: Mancott & Pentre United
- 1893-1896: Queensferry Ironopolis

Senior career*
| Years | Team | Apps | (Gls) |
| 1896-1897 | Wrexham | 9 | (1) |

International career
| 1898 | Wales | 1 | (0) |
- * Club domestic league appearances and goals

John Taylor (born 1874) was a Welsh international footballer. He was part of the Wales national football team, playing 1 match on 28 March 1898 against England. At club level, he played for Wrexham.

== See also ==
- List of Wales international footballers (alphabetical)
