= Jack Taylor (Australian footballer) =

Australian rules footballer (born 1924)

Personal information
- Full name: Jack Taylor
- Born: 9 May 1924
- Original team: Melbourne High School
- Height: 178 cm (5 ft 10 in)
- Weight: 81 kg (179 lb)

Playing career^{1}
Years	Club	Games (Goals)
1945	Hawthorn	2 (0)
- ^{1} Playing statistics correct to the end of 1945.

Jack Taylor (born 9 May 1924) is a former Australian rules footballer who played with Hawthorn in the Victorian Football League (VFL).
