= John Taylor (footballer, born 1924) =

English footballer (1924–1995)

Personal information
- Full name: John Taylor
- Date of birth: 24 June 1924
- Place of birth: Driffield, England
- Date of death: 1995 (aged 70–71)
- Place of death: Beverley, England
- Position: Inside forward

Senior career*
Years	Team	Apps	(Gls)
- Manningham Mills
- Kilmarnock
1946–1947	Bradford City	2	(2)
Total		2	(2)
- * Club domestic league appearances and goals

John Taylor (24 June 1924 – 1995) was an English professional footballer who played as an inside forward.

== Career ==
Born in Driffield on 24 June 1924, Taylor spent his early career with Manningham Mills and Kilmarnock. He signed for Bradford City in September 1946, scoring 2 goals in 2 league appearances for the club, before being released in 1947. He died in Beverley in 1995.

== Sources ==
- Frost, Terry (1988). Bradford City A Complete Record 1903-1988. Breedon Books Sport. ISBN 0-907969-38-0.
