= Jon Taylor (political scientist) =

American political scientist

- Born: Dallas, Texas, United States
- Education: University of Oklahoma
- Scientific career
- Fields: Political science
- Workplaces: Department chair, University of Texas at San Antonio, United States

Jon Raymond Taylor is an American political scientist and author. He holds a PhD in political science from The University of Oklahoma. He is the head of the Department of Political Science and Geography at the University of Texas at San Antonio. His research focuses primarily on Chinese politics, comparative public sector ethics, and urbanization in China and the United States.

== Biography ==
Taylor was born and raised in Dallas, Texas.

He completed his undergraduate studies in political science and history, as well as his graduate studies in political science, at the University of Oklahoma. He went on to serve as a professor at his alma mater from 1990 to 1998. He later served as the Department Chair of Political Science and Director of the Master of Public Policy and Administration Program at the University of St. Thomas in Houston.

Currently he serves as the Department Chair of Political Science and Geography at The University of Texas at San Antonio.

== Research ==
Taylor analyses the Chinese government, including the 21st-century administration's fight against corruption, the contribution of Chinese policy to international approaches to public administration, and comparative studies in public administration.

He has written and spoken about the challenges posed by urbanization and governmental corruption in both the United States and China.

== Political views ==
Taylor has expressed concerns about the fairness of election procedures in Texas and across the United States. Following the Texas government's implementation of changes to election procedures in 2021, Taylor described the state of democracy in America as "dinged." He suggested that the decision of the Supreme Court to overturn Title 5 of the Voting Rights Act opened the door for racism and discrimination to take hold in state legislatures.

In 2021, Texas passed SB 8, banning abortions after the detection of cardiac activity in the fetus. Taylor criticized this legislation from several angles:

To me it’s a bit problematic to try to prove, say, you’re in El Paso to cross the border to New Mexico to get an abortion. It’s like chasing someone for fireworks in Bexar County; can you actually prove it?

... If right to privacy doesn’t exist for abortion, how can it exist for marriage equality? How can it exist for contraception? How can it exist for a variety of personal decisions? That’s where I think we’re headed potentially next.

— KENS 5 News

Taylor has criticized support by certain members of the Texas legislature for secession from the United States. "There is NO constitutional right to secede," quoth the professor in a public Twitter response to Texas HB 3596.

== See also ==
- Urbanization in China
- Corruption in China
