= Brian R. Taylor =

American politician

Member of the New Hampshire House of Representatives from the Carroll 8th district
- Incumbent
- Assumed office December 4, 2024
- Succeeded by: Colin Mitchell (elect)

Personal details
- Party: Republican

Brian R. Taylor is an American politician. He serves as a Republican member for the Carroll 8th district of the New Hampshire House of Representatives.
