= John Taylor (painter) =

English painter (1580–1653)

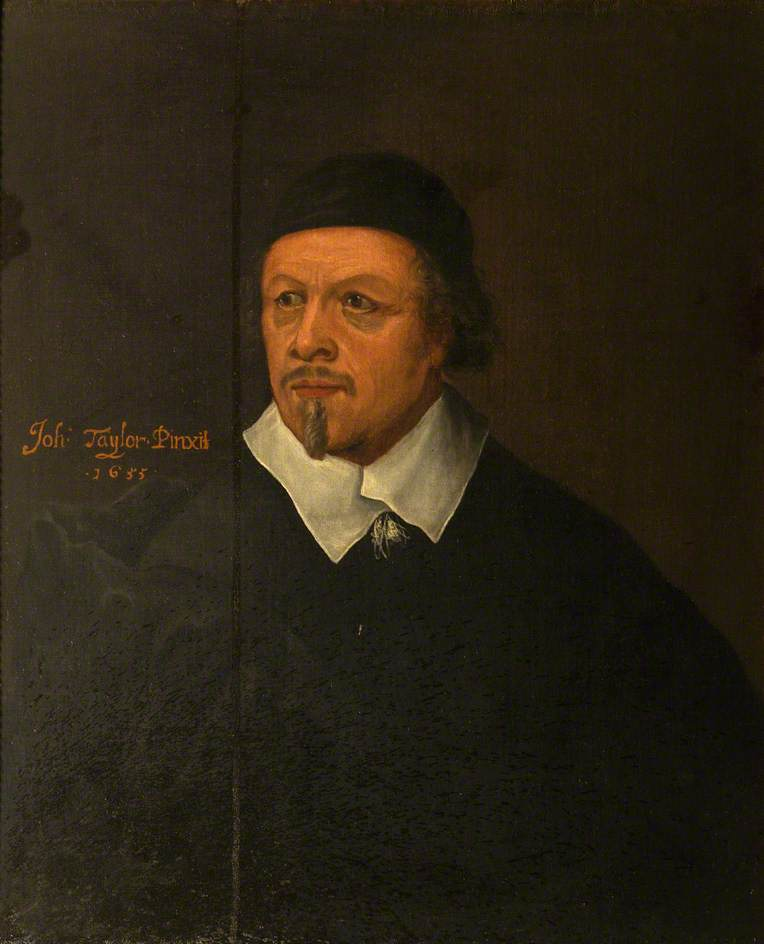
- Portrait of John Taylor (1655)
- Born: c. 1580
- Died: 1653 (aged 72–73)
- Known for: Painting
- Notable work: Chandos portrait (c. 1600–10; attributed)

John Taylor (c. 1580–1653) was an English artist who has been put forth as the most likely painter of the Chandos portrait of William Shakespeare. All of John Taylor's other paintings have since become lost.

== Early life ==
Taylor was born around 1580 and he was probably a child actor with the Children of Paul's in the late 1590s. Though there was certainly a boy actor of that name with the troupe, it cannot be proved that this was the artist. The connection is based on George Vertue's assertion that the artist was also an actor. It is possible that confusion has arisen with the well-known actor Joseph Taylor, who also began his career as a child actor. Vertue also says that Taylor was an "intimate friend" of Shakespeare's.

== Career ==
The Chandos portrait, believed to have been painted by Taylor

Taylor allegedly created the Chandos portrait between 1600 and 1610. It is believed to depict William Shakespeare.

By the 1620s Taylor was a member of the Painter-Stainers' Company, having at least six apprentices between 1626 and 1648. Taylor became a significant figure within the company, rising to the positions of Renter Warden (1632–33), Upper Warden (1635–36) and Master (1643–44).

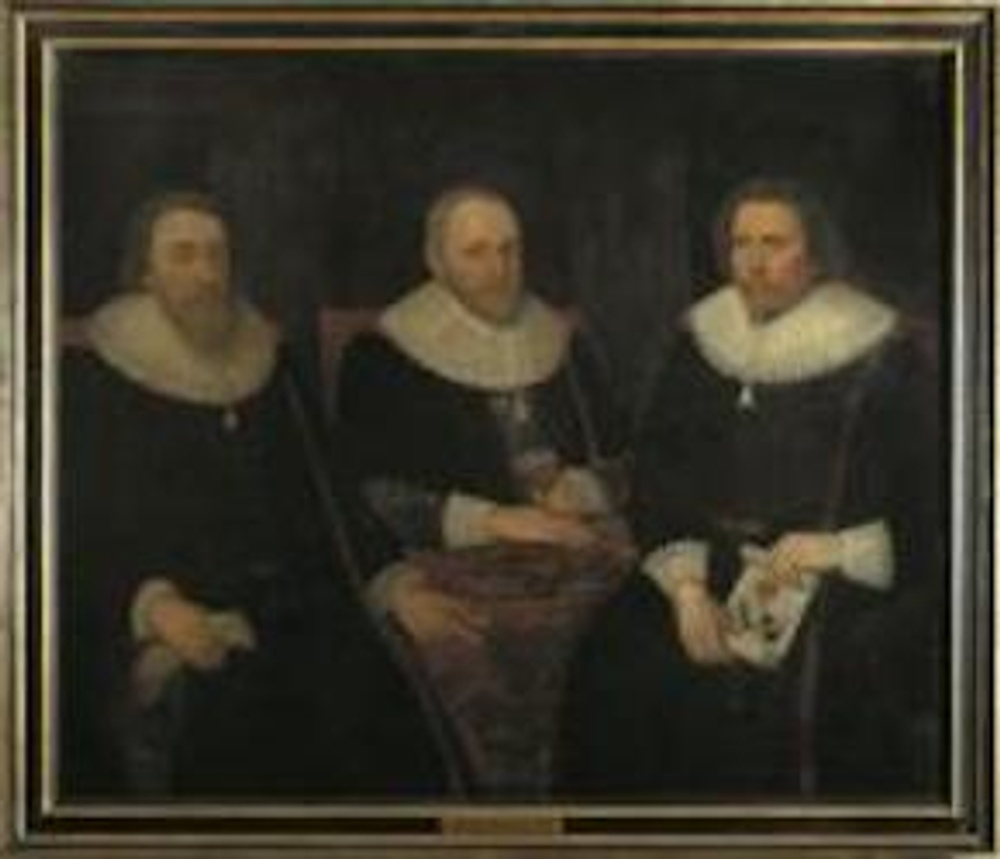
The Potkin Group (1632) depicting Renter Warden John Taylor (left), Master John Potkin (middle), and Upper Warden Thomas Carleton

== Later life and death ==
A portrait of Taylor in his official capacity as Warden (The Potkin Group) was created in 1632 and is in the collection of the company.

He died in 1653.
