= John Taylor (cricketer, born 1923) =

English cricketer

Personal information
- Full name: John Denis Taylor
- Born: 18 February 1923; Ipswich, Suffolk, England
- Died: 14 March 1991 (aged 67); Southampton, Hampshire, England
- Batting: Right-handed
- Bowling: Right-arm medium

Domestic team information
- Years: Team
- 1937–1939: Hampshire

Career statistics
Competition	First-class
Matches	4
Runs scored	76
Batting average	15.20
100s/50s	–/–
Top score	27*
Balls bowled	18
Wickets	0
Bowling average	–
5 wickets in innings	–
10 wickets in match	–
Best bowling	–
Catches/stumpings	–/–
- Source: Cricinfo, 10 January 2010

John Denis Taylor (18 February 1923 — 14 March 1991) was an English first-class cricketer.

Taylor was born at Ipswich in February 1923. He did not play for Hampshire in 1946, due to him not being demobilised in time from his wartime military service. Taylor was able to play for Hampshire the following season, making his debut in first-class cricket during the Bournemouth Cricket Week, making two appearances against Lancashire and Yorkshire. He did not play for Hampshire in 1948, but made two further appearances in 1949 against Nottinghamshire in the County Championship at Southampton, and the Combined Services at Portsmouth. Taylor left Hampshire prior to the beginning of the 1950 season, departing alongside Jim Bailey, Gilbert Dawson, Tom Dean, George Heath, and Lofty Herman. In his four first-class matches, he scored 76 runs at an average of 15.20, with a highest score of 27 not out. Taylor died at Southampton in March 1991.
