= John Bigelow Taylor =

- Born: 1949 or 1950 (age 75–76)
- Occupation: photographer
- Spouse: Dianne Dubler

John Bigelow Taylor (c. 1950) is a photographer of works of art based in New York City. Along with his wife Dianne Dubler, Taylor is known for publishing photographic monographs on a diverse range of subjects including architecture and interior design, as well as collections of jewelry and fine art.

His work has been described as "superb" by John Boardman of The New York Review of Books and "impressive" by Marie Arana-Ward of The Washington Post.

== Career ==
In the early 1970s John Bigelow Taylor and his partner, Dianne Dubler, traveled throughout southern Asia; the couple documented the peoples, cultures and locations they encountered while traveling and living in India, Afghanistan and Nepal.

After their travels in Asia, Taylor and Dubler were advised by their friend, Gillett Griffin, then curator of pre-Columbian art at Princeton University Art Museum. to concentrate on the photography of works of art. Taylor and Dubler have stated that Griffin's encouragement and guidance greatly contributed to Taylor's career as a still life photographer of art, antiquities and architecture.

Taylor later collaborated with publisher Harry N. Abrams on several books including "Wisdom and Compassion : The Sacred Art of Tibet" (1991) featuring photographs of Tibetan sculpture, tapestries and sand mandalas, The Cycladic Spirit (1991) featuring Cycladic art from the Goulandris Collection in Athens, The White House Collection of American Crafts (1995) with Hillary Clinton, Gold Without Boundaries (1998), featuring sculpture and gold work by the artist Daniel Brush and Waddesdon Manor : The Heritage of a Rothschild House (2010), a one-year study of Ferdinand de Rothschild's Waddesdon Manor.

In 1991 Taylor and Dubler established Kubaba books, a publishing company devoted to produce limited-edition photography books. In an interview with the authors of Design Entrepreneur: Turning Graphic Design Into Goods That Sell, when asked about the origin of the company's name, Dubler explained: "Kubaba was the earliest Indo-European name for the great mother-goddess of Anatolia."

Inspired by their work on the book Waddesdon Manor : The Heritage of a Rothschild House produced for Scala Art Publishers, Kubaba's focus since 2010 shifted towards producing books that document their clients' private homes and estates; some of these clients have included Jane Stieren and her husband Bill N. Lacy, a former president of the Cooper Union and former executive director of the Pritzker Architecture Prize, as well as Anne Sidamon-Eristoff, a former chairman of the American Museum of Natural History.

Taylor also specializes in jewelry photography as demonstrated in photographs of Elizabeth Taylor's collection for Simon & Schuster's My Love Affair With Jewelry (2002), as well as Read My Pins: Stories from a Diplomat’s Jewel Box (2009), a catalog of brooches belonging to Secretary of State Madeleine Albright.

== Books ==
- Within the Underworld Sky: Mimbres Ceramic Art in Context, June 1984, 162 pages, ISBN 0-942642-11-2
- Pre-Columbian Art from the Ernest Erickson Collection at the American Museum of Natural History, January 1988, ISBN 0-8109-3169-9
- The Cycladic Spirit: Masterpieces from the Nicholas P. Goulandris Collection, September 1991, 207 pages, ISBN 0-8109-3169-9
- The Inca Empire and Its Andean Origins, October 1993, 251 pages, ISBN 1-55859-556-2
- The Currency of Fame: Portrait Medals of the Renaissance, March 1994, 424 pages, ISBN 0-8109-3191-5
- The Splendor of Ethnic Jewelry, September 1994, 256 pages, ISBN 0-8109-4453-7
- Judith Leiber: The Artful Handbag, March 1995, 159 pages, ISBN 0-8109-3571-6
- Swarovski: The Magic of Crystal, April 1995, 158 pages, ISBN 0-8109-4454-5
- The White House Collection of American Crafts, April 1995, 128 pages, ISBN 0-8109-4035-3
- Masterpieces of American Indian Art: From the Eugene and Clare Thaw Collection, September 1995, 96 pages, ISBN 0-8109-2628-8
- Learning from the Dalai Lama: Secrets of the Wheel of Time, October 1995, 40 pages, ISBN 0-525-45063-7
- Gioielli Etnici: Africa, Asia, Americhe, Oceania dalla Collezione di Colette e Jean-Pierre Ghysels, January 1996, 294 pages, ISBN 88-8118-610-1
- The Olmec World: Ritual and Rulership, March 1996, 344 pages, ISBN 0-8109-6311-6
- Art in the Frick Collection: Paintings, Sculpture, Decorative Arts, September 1996, 208 pages, ISBN 0-8109-1972-9
- Wisdom and Compassion: The Sacred Art of Tibet, September 1996, 488 pages, ISBN 0-8109-3985-1
- Kenneth Jay Lane: Faking It, September 1996, 160 pages, ISBN 0-8109-3579-1
- Paul J. Stankard: Homage to Nature, October 1996, 160 pages, ISBN 0-8109-4473-1
- Recycled Re-Seen: Folk Art from the Global Scrap Heap, October 1996, 208 pages, ISBN 0-8109-2666-0
- Venetian Glass: Confections in Glass 1855-1914, March 1998, 128 pages, ISBN 0-8109-3939-8
- Daniel Brush: Gold Without Boundaries, September 1998, 275 pages, ISBN 0-8109-4018-3
- Schmuck: Kostbarkeiten aus Afrika, Asien, Ozeanien und Amerika aus der Sammlung Ghysels, January 1999, 287 pages, ISBN 3-7757-0867-7
- Crosscurrents: Masterpieces of East Asian Art from New York Private Collections, March 1999, 195 pages, ISBN 0-8109-6386-8
- Evidence: The Art of Candy Jernigan, July 1999, 176 pages, ISBN 0-8118-2307-5
- Masterpieces of American Furniture from the Munson-Williams-Proctor Institute, July 1999, 171 pages, ISBN 0-8156-8127-5
- Meyer Schapiro: His Painting, Drawing, and Sculpture, March 2000, 256 pages, ISBN 0-8109-4392-1
- Wisdom and Compassion: The Sacred Art of Tibet, September 2000, 488 pages, ISBN 0-8109-8204-8
- The Splendor of Ethnic Jewelry: From the Colette and Jean-Pierre Ghysels Collection, March 2001, 256 pages, ISBN 0-8109-2993-7
- Waddesdon Manor: The Heritage of a Rothschild House, May 2002, 320 pages, ISBN 0-8109-3239-3
- Divine Presence: Arts of India and the Himalayas, August 2003, 180 pages, ISBN 88-7439-022-X
- Cincinnati Art-Carved Furniture and Interiors, November 2003, 295 pages, ISBN 0-8214-1511-5
- Elizabeth Taylor: My Love Affair with Jewelry, December 2003, 240 pages, ISBN 0-7432-5438-4
- A Walk through the Ages: Chinese Archaic Art from the Sondra Landy Gross Collection, January 2004, 224 pages, ISBN 0-9745561-0-6
- New Guinea Art: Masterpieces from the Jolika Collection of Marcia and John Friede, January 2005, 629 pages, ISBN 0-88401-118-6
- Ferdinand Richardt: Drawings of America, 1855-1859, February 2007, 80 pages, ISBN 0-913424-12-9
- Read My Pins: Stories from a Diplomat’s Jewel Box, September 2009, 176 pages, ISBN 0-06193-849-1

== Photographic exhibitions ==
- Microcosm: The New York Chinese Scholar's Garden, curated by Christophe W. Mao and Judith Whitbeck, Chinese Scholar's Garden at the Staten Island Botanical Garden, April 26–28, 2002
- The Armory Wall: A Tribute to September 11, ongoing traveling exhibition
