= John H. Taylor (Mormon) =

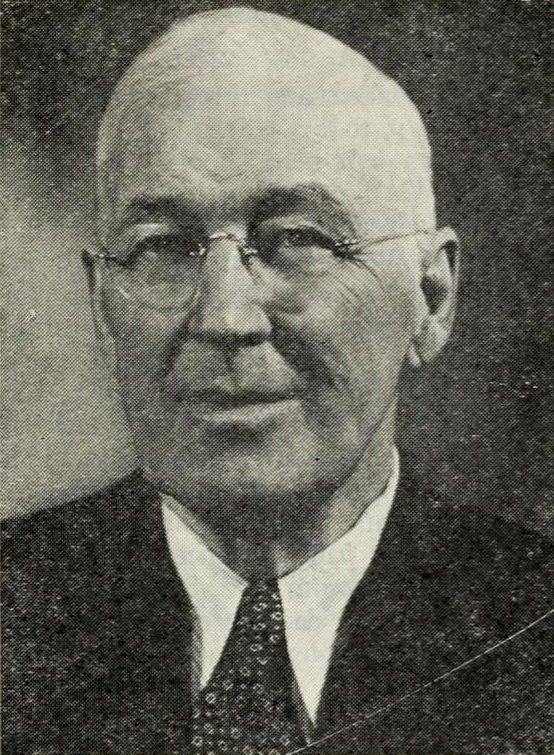
- John H. Taylor in 1946

First Council of the Seventy
- October 6, 1933 – May 28, 1946
- Called by: Heber J. Grant

Personal details
- Born: John Harris Taylor; June 18, 1875; Salt Lake City, Utah Territory
- Died: May 28, 1946 (aged 70); Salt Lake City, Utah

John Harris Taylor (28 June 1875 – 28 May 1946) was one of the seven presidents of The Seventy in the Church of Jesus Christ of Latter-day Saints (LDS Church).

Born in Salt Lake City, Utah Territory, Taylor was the son of Thomas E. Taylor and the paternal grandson of church president John Taylor. Taylor was baptized into the LDS Church at age eight. At age 14, he received the Aaronic priesthood and was ordained a deacon, teacher and priest before he was ordained a seventy in 1896.

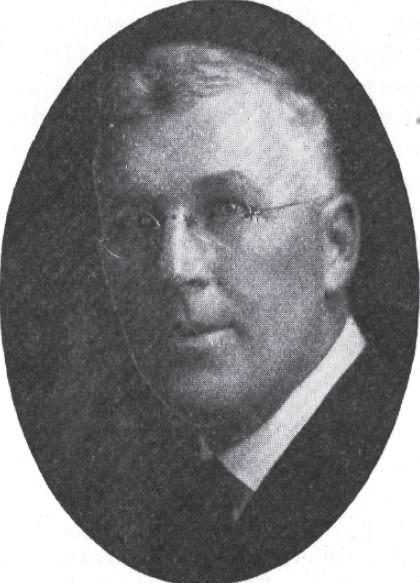
John H. Taylor ca. 1936

From 1896 to 1898 Taylor served as a missionary for the LDS Church in England. Taylor married Susan Rachel Grant, a daughter of future church president Heber J. Grant and his wife Lucy Stringham Grant, in 1900. From 1907 to 1909 Taylor served in the Netherlands Mission of the church, and for much of this time was the president of the Belgium District of the church.

Taylor attended the Chicago College of Dental Surgery (later Loyola University Chicago) and was a dentist by profession. He served as scout commissioner for the church when the church affiliated with the Boy Scouts of America in 1913. He was president of the church's Northern States Mission from 1923 to 1928. In 1925 the mission had slightly over 5000 members and 127 missionaries.

In 1928, Taylor became president of the mission home in Salt Lake City, Utah (predecessor to the Missionary Training Center). He was installed as one of the Seven Presidents of Seventy in 1933, where he served until his death in Salt Lake City from a coronary thrombosis.

His wife Rachel Grant Taylor was for a time a member of the General Board of the LDS Young Women organization.
