= Brian Taylor (footballer, born 1931) =

English footballer (1931–??)

Personal information
- Full name: John Brian Taylor
- Date of birth: 7 October 1931
- Place of birth: Rossington, England
- Position: Goalkeeper

Youth career
- Sheffield Wednesday

Senior career*
Years	Team	Apps	(Gls)
1949–1950	Doncaster Rovers	0	(0)
1950–1951	Worksop Town		
1951–1952	Leeds United	11	(0)
1952–1954	King's Lynn		
1954–1956	Bradford (Park Avenue)	66	(0)
Total		77	(0)
- * Club domestic league appearances and goals

John Brian Taylor (born 7 October 1931) was an English professional footballer who played as a goalkeeper.

== Career ==
Born in Rossington, Taylor played for Sheffield Wednesday, Doncaster Rovers, Worksop Town, Leeds United, King's Lynn and Bradford (Park Avenue).
