= Shakespeare festival =

Theatre festival focusing on William Shakespeare plays

A Shakespeare festival is a theatre organization that stages the works of William Shakespeare continually.

== Origins ==
In 1830, the Mulberry Club (a scholarly group formed in Stratford-upon-Avon, named after the destroyed New Place mulberry tree) began organising annual festivities on Shakespeare's birthday, which they referred to as the "Shakespeare Festival". These continued until at least 1836. From 1886 to 1919, Frank Benson directed 28 spring and six summer "Shakespeare festivals" at the original Shakespeare Memorial Theatre in Stratford.

In 1935 the Oregon Shakespeare Festival, or OSF, was founded in Ashland, Oregon, USA. Originally named the "Oregon Shakespearean Festival"; the name was changed in 1988. Angus L. Bowmer, founder of OSF, wrote in 1954 that Shakespeare Festivals have in common the following attributes: 1) established firmly in one place; 2) repertoire (staging a variety of Shakespeare plays) and 3) a physical stage similar to that used in Shakespeare's lifetime. According to Bowmer, the inspiration for Elizabethan staging of contemporary Shakespeare productions came from William Poel, an English director who organized the Elizabethan Stage Society in London in the early 20th century. His concepts of Elizabethan staging were brought to North America by Ben Iden Payne.

Other early Shakespeare festivals in North America staged on replicas of the Globe Theatre include the Old Globe Theatre in San Diego (1937) and the Hofstra Shakespeare Festival, launched at Hofstra University in 1950. The American Shakespeare Theatre operated on a festival stage in Stratford, Connecticut, United States from 1955 to the 1980s.

Arthur Lithgow, father of actor John Lithgow, founded the "Antioch Shakespeare Festival" (also known as Shakespeare Under the Stars") at Antioch College in Yellow Springs, Ohio in 1952. In its five years of existence, the Festival performed the entire Shakespeare canon. In 1953, the Stratford Shakespeare Festival was founded in the Canadian city of Stratford, Ontario, with Tyrone Guthrie as the festival's first Artistic Director. The New York Shakespeare Festival in New York City (now known as The Public Theater) has produced Free Shakespeare shows since 1955.

== Festivals ==
=== Canada ===
- Bard on the Beach — Vancouver, British Columbia
- Freewill Shakespeare Festival — Edmonton, Alberta
- Repercussion Theatre — Montreal, Quebec
- Shakespeare by the Sea — Halifax, Nova Scotia
- Shakespeare by the Sea — St. John's, Newfoundland and Labrador
- Shakespeare in the Ruff — Toronto, Ontario
- Shakespeare in the Ruins — Winnipeg, Manitoba
- Shakespeare on the Saskatchewan — Saskatoon, Saskatchewan
- Stratford Shakespeare Festival — Stratford, Ontario

=== Europe ===
- Bremer Shakespeare Company — Bremen, Germany
- Craiova International Shakespeare Festival — Craiova, Romania
- Dublin Shakespeare Society — Dublin, Ireland
- Gdańsk Shakespeare Festival — Gdańsk, Poland
- Prague Shakespeare Festival — Prague, Czech Republic

=== United Kingdom ===
- Bard in the Botanics — Glasgow, Scotland
- Cheek by Jowl — London, England
- Creation Theatre Company — Oxford, England
- Dolphin's Back — London, England
- Druid Shakespeare — Galway, Ireland
- Edward's Boys — Stratford-upon-Avon, England
- National Theatre — London, England
- Original Shakespeare Company — London, England
- Oxford Shakespeare Festival — Oxford, England
- Rose Playhouse Bankside — London, England
- Rose Theatre Kingston — Kingston upon Thames, England
- Royal Exchange — Manchester, England
- Royal Shakespeare Company — London, England
- shakespeare.scot — Dundee, Scotland
- Shakespeare's Globe — Stratford-upon-Avon, England
- Sirrah Sisters — London, England
- Smooth Faced Gentlemen — London, England
- York Shakespeare Project — York, England

=== United States ===
- Actors' Shakespeare Project — Boston, Massachusetts
- African-American Shakespeare Company — San Francisco, California
- Alabama Shakespeare Festival — Montgomery, Alabama
- American Players Theatre — Spring Green, Wisconsin
- American Shakespeare Center — Staunton, Virginia
- Annapolis Shakespeare Company — Annapolis, Maryland
- Antioch Shakespeare Festival — Yellow Springs, Ohio
- Arkansas Shakespeare Theatre — Conway, Arkansas
- Atlanta Shakespeare Company — Atlanta, Georgia
- Austin Shakespeare — Austin, Texas
- Bag & Baggage Productions — Hillsboro, Oregon
- Baltimore Shakespeare Factory — Baltimore, Maryland
- Band of Brothers Shakespeare Company — Johnstown, Pennsylvania
- Barefoot Shakespeare Company — New York City, New York
- Bath Shakespeare Festival — Bath, Maine
- Bay Colony Shakespeare Company — Marshfield, Massachusetts
- Brave Spirits Theatre — McLean, Virginia
- California Shakespeare Theater — Orinda, California
- Camden Shakespeare Festival — Camden, Maine
- Chesapeake Shakespeare Company — Baltimore, Maryland
- Chicago Shakespeare Theater — Chicago, Illinois
- Cincinnati Shakespeare Company — Cincinnati, Ohio
- Classical Actors Ensemble — Minneapolis–Saint Paul, Minnesota
- Cleveland Shakespeare Festival - Cleveland, Ohio
- Colonial Theater Shakespeare Festival — Westerly, Rhode Island
- Colorado Shakespeare Festival — Boulder, Colorado
- Connecticut Free Shakespeare — Norwalk, Connecticut
- Commonwealth Shakespeare Company — Boston, Massachusetts
- Coos Bay Shakespeare in the Park — Coos Bay, Oregon
- Cromulent Shakespeare Company — Minneapolis–Saint Paul, Minnesota
- Delaware Shakespeare — Wilmington, Delaware
- Door Shakespeare — Sister Bay, Wisconsin
- Fairbanks Shakespeare Theatre — Fairbanks, Alaska
- Fern Shakespeare Company — Atlanta, Georgia
- First Folio Shakespeare Festival — Oak Brook, Illinois
- Flagstaff Shakespeare Festival — Flagstaff, Arizona
- Flatwater Shakespeare Company — Lincoln, Nebraska
- Flint Hills Shakespeare Festival — St. Marys, Kansas
- Florida Shakespeare Theatre — Miami, Florida
- Folger Shakespeare Theatre — Washington, D.C.
- Foothills Theatre Company — Littleton, Colorado
- Garfield Shakespeare Company — Indianapolis, Indiana
- Georgia Shakespeare Festival — Atlanta, Georgia
- Grand Valley Shakespeare Festival — Allendale, Michigan
- Great River Shakespeare Festival — Winona, Minnesota
- GreenStage — Seattle, Washington
- Hampshire Shakespeare Company — Amherst, Massachusetts
- Hamptons Shakespeare Festival — Long Island, New York
- Harlem Shakespeare Festival — Harlem, New York
- Harrisburg Shakespeare Festival — Harrisburg, Pennsylvania
- Hawai'i Shakespeare Festival — Honolulu, Hawai'i
- Heart of America Shakespeare Festival — Kansas City, Missouri
- Hip to Hip Theatre Company — New York City, New York
- Hofstra Shakespeare Festival — Hempstead, New York
- Hoosier Shakespeare Festival — Marion, Indiana
- Houston Shakespeare Festival — Houston, Texas
- Hudson Shakespeare Company — Stratford, Connecticut
- Hudson Valley Shakespeare Festival — Garrison, New York
- Hudson Warehouse — New York City, New York
- Idaho Shakespeare Festival — Boise, Idaho
- Illinois Shakespeare Festival — Bloomington, Illinois
- Iowa Shakespeare Experience — Des Moines, Iowa
- Kentucky Shakespeare Festival — Louisville, Kentucky
- Lantern Theatre Company — Philadelphia, Pennsylvania
- Lake Tahoe Shakespeare Festival — Lake Tahoe, California
- Lakeside Shakespeare — Benzie County, Michigan
- Lord Denney's Players — Columbus, Ohio
- Madison Shakespeare Company — Waunakee, Wisconsin
- Marin Shakespeare Company — San Rafael, California
- Michigan Shakespeare Festival — Jackson, Michigan
- Missouri Shakespeare Festival — Joplin, Missouri
- Montana Shakespeare in the Parks — Bozeman, Montana
- Montford Park Players — Asheville, North Carolina
- Muse of Fire Theatre Company — Evanston, Illinois
- Nashville Shakespeare Festival — Jackson, Michigan
- Nebraska Shakespeare Festival — Omaha, Nebraska
- New Orleans Shakespeare Festival — New Orleans, Louisiana
- New Swan Shakespeare Festival — Irvine, California
- New York Shakespeare Festival — New York City, New York
- North Carolina Shakespeare Festival — Winston-Salem, North Carolina
- North Dakota Shakespeare Festival — Grand Forks, North Dakota
- Notre Dame Shakespeare Festival — South Bend, Indiana
- Ohio Shakespeare Theatre — Akron, Ohio
- Old Globe Theatre — San Diego, California
- Oregon Shakespeare Festival — Ashland, Oregon
- Original Practice Shakespeare Festival — Portland, Oregon
- Orlando Shakes — Orlando, California
- Pennsylvania Shakespeare Festival — Center Valley, Pennsylvania
- Philadelphia Shakespeare Theatre — Philadelphia, Pennsylvania
- Pigeon Creek Shakespeare Company — Grand Haven, Michigan
- Pittsburgh Shakespeare in the Park — Pittsburgh, Pennsylvania
- Portland Actors Ensemble — Portland, Oregon
- Red Bull Theatre — New York City, New York
- Resurgens Theatre Company — Atlanta, Georgia
- Richmond Shakespeare Festival — Richmond, Virginia
- Riverside Shakespeare Company — New York City, New York
- Robinson Shakespeare Company — South Bend, Indiana
- Rochester Community Players — Rochester, New York
- Rome Shakespeare Festival — Rome, Georgia
- San Francisco Shakespeare Festival — San Francisco, California
- Saint Louis Shakespeare Festival — St. Louis, Missouri
- Santa Clarita Shakespeare — Santa Clarita, California
- Santa Cruz Shakespeare — Santa Cruz, California
- Seattle Shakespeare Festival — Seattle, Washington
- Seven Stages Shakespeare Company — Portsmouth, New Hampshire
- Shakespeare & Company (Minnesota) — White Bear Lake, Minnesota
- Shakespeare & Company (Massachusetts) — Lenox, Massachusetts
- Shakespeare by the Sea — San Pedro, California
- Shakespeare Carolina — Rock Hill, South Carolina
- Shakespeare Festival of Dallas — Dallas, Texas
- Shakespeare in Delaware Park — Buffalo, New York
- Shakespeare in Detroit — Detroit, Michigan
- Shakespeare in Yosemite — Merced, California
- Shakespeare Now! Theatre Company — Brookline, Massachusetts
- Shakespeare Theatre of New Jersey — Madison, New Jersey
- Shakespeare Theatre Company — Washington, D.C.
- Silicon Valley Shakespeare — Washington, D.C.
- South Carolina Shakespeare Company — Columbia, South Carolina
- South Dakota Shakespeare Festival — Vermillion, South Dakota
- Southern Shakespeare Festival — Tallahassee, Florida
- Southwest Shakespeare Company — Mesa, Arizona
- Sweet Tea Shakespeare — Fayetteville, North Carolina
- Syracuse Shakespeare in the Park — Syracuse, New York
- Taffety Punk Theatre Company — Washington, D.C.
- Tennessee Shakespeare Company — Fayetteville, North Carolina
- Texas Shakespeare Festival — Kilgore, Texas
- Theatre at Monmouth — Monmouth, Maine
- Theatre for a New Audience — New York City, New York
- Troupe of Friends — Westfield, New Jersey
- Upstate Shakespeare Festival — Greenville, South Carolina
- Utah Shakespeare Festival — Cedar City, Utah
- Vermont Shakespeare Festival — Greensboro, Vermont
- Virginia Shakespeare Festival — Williamsburg, Virginia
- Viroqua Shakespeare Festival — Viroqua, Wisconsin
- Washington Shakespeare Festival — Mount Vernon, Washington
- West Virginia Shakespeare Festival — Huntington, West Virginia
- What You Will Shakespeare Company — Urbana, Illinois
- Wichita Shakespeare Company — Wichita, Kansas
- Will Geer Theatricum Botanicum — Topanga, California
- Wyoming Shakespeare Festival Company — Lander, Wyoming
- Young Shakespeare Players — Madison, Wisconsin

==== Staged reading series ====
- Alabama Shakespeare Project — Tuscaloosa, Alabama
- Appalachian Shakespeare Project — Athens, West Virginia
- Back Room Shakespeare Project — Chicago, Illinois
- Black Shakespeare Project — Brooklyn, New York
- Manhattan Shakespeare Project — Manhattan, New York
- Play On! Shakespeare Project — Portland, Oregon
- Portland Shakespeare Project — Portland, Oregon
- Shakespeare Project of Chicago — Chicago, Illinois
- The Shakespeare Project — New York City, New York

=== Fictional ===
- New Burbage Shakespeare Festival — New Burbage, Canada (Slings & Arrows)

== See also ==
- Shakespeare Theatre Association
- Shakespeare in the Park festivals
- European Shakespeare Festivals Network (ESFN)
- List of festivals in Glasgow
- List of festivals in the United States
- Repertory theatre
- Shakespeare Club of Stratford-upon-Avon
