= Shakespeare in the Park festivals =

Outdoor festivals featuring productions of William Shakespeare's plays

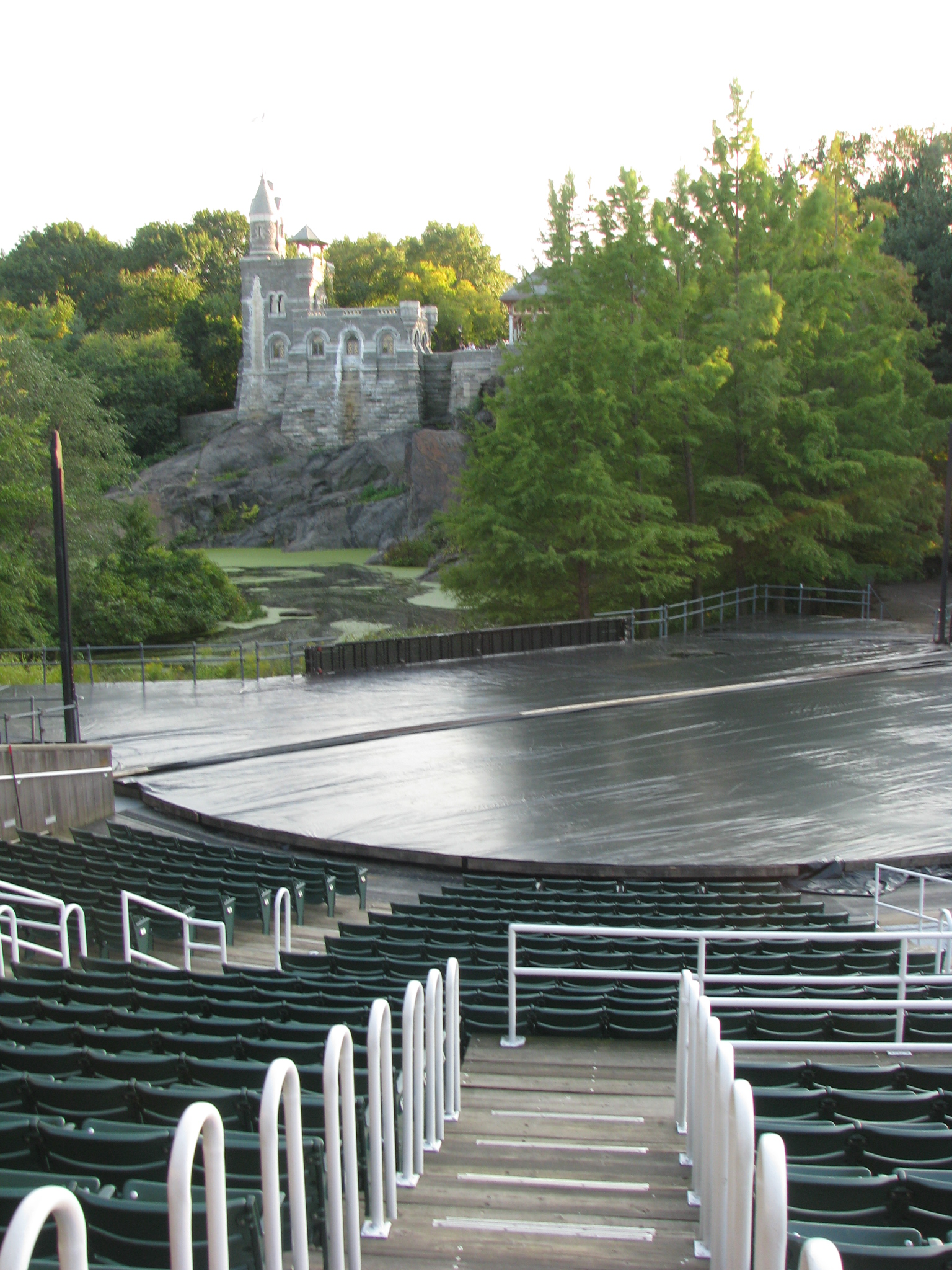
The Delacorte Theater in New York City's Central Park

Shakespeare in the Park is a term for outdoor festivals featuring productions of William Shakespeare's plays. The term originated with the New York Shakespeare Festival in New York City's Central Park, originally created by Joseph Papp. This concept has been adapted by many theatre companies, and over time, this name has expanded to encompass outdoor theatre productions of the playwright's works performed all over the world.

Shakespeare in the Park started as an idea to make theatre available to people of all walks of life, so that it would be as readily available as library books. The performances are often offered with free admission to the general public, usually presented outdoors as a summer event. These types of performances can be seen by audiences around the world, with most festivals adapting the name for their productions, such as Vancouver's Bard on the Beach. Many festivals incorporate workshops, food, and other additions to the performances making this type of theatre experience an interactive community event.

== Asia ==
=== Singapore ===
The Singapore Repertory Theatre (SRT) currently organises annual Shakespeare in the Park performances at Fort Canning Park as Singapore's largest outdoor theatre show. It began with a staging of Hamlet in 1997 and faced several challenges across the years due to the company's lack of funding and grappling with Singapore's wet and tropical climate. The productions often focuses on retellings that introduce Shakespeare to the modern audience and emphasises audience engagement, with unique themes for each production. The event draws a nightly audience of 1,500 and around 30,000 for every production as of 2015, with a S$2 million production cost as of the 2023 production. The temporary stage at Fort Canning Park is arranged such that there are "Premium Picnic", "Picnic" and "Pavilion" seating categories. Each production provides Access Shows with Closed Caption and Audio Described performances. As of 2025, a Creative Captions performance was also designed to cater to patrons who are Deaf or Hard of Hearing.

== Australia ==
One of the earliest recorded instances of an outdoors performance of Shakespeare in Australia occurred in December 1933 when the Perth Repertory Club staged The Merry Wives of Windsor in a corner of the Perth Supreme Court gardens, although this was a fairly unusual event. By the 1980s, the number of outdoor performances in Australia was increasing. Alan Edwards produced performances in Brisbane's Albert Park in 1979; David MacSwan launched Sydney's Shakespeare by the Sea in 1987 and Glenn Elston did likewise with Shakespeare Under the Stars in Melbourne in 1988.

=== Australian Shakespeare Company (Melbourne) ===
The Australian Shakespeare Company (ASC) was co-founded in 1982 by British actor and director Neale Warrington with a number of other actors. It rose to greater prominence in 1987 with Shakespeare Under the Stars, a program through which Glenn Elston pioneered outdoor theatre performances of William Shakespeare's plays in Australia. Elston become the artistic director of the company in 1988, and remains in that position as of August 2025. The company has performed for more than a million people across all the different regions of Australia. They make it a mission to draw audiences of all age groups to their shows. The ASC also co-hosts the Walking with Spirits Indigenous culture festival in Wugularr, Northern Territory.

=== Shakespeare by the Lakes (Canberra) ===
Shakespeare by the Lakes is a summer festival of free Shakespeare plays, produced by theatre company Lakespeare & Co. (established by Founder and Executive Producer Taimus Werner-Gibbings and collaborators Duncan Driver, Lexi Sekuless and Paul Leverenz), and attracting over 5,000 patrons to ACT public parks.

=== Shakespeare in the Park Festival at Toowoomba ===
Originally presented in Toowoomba's Queen's Park (2004–2011), this festival moved in 2012 to the University of Southern Queensland's Toowoomba campus where the casts included Creative Arts students from the University of Southern Queensland. Presentations include The Tempest, Romeo and Juliet, Macbeth, Comedy of Errors, Taming of the Shrew, Hamlet, Twelfth Night and A Midsummer Night's Dream. The final performance was given in 2018.

=== Zootango, Directions & Theatre Royal Performances in the Tasmanian Botanical Gardens (Hobart, Tasmania) ===
In 1980, the Round Earth Theatre Company (which had been founded in Western Australia in 1972) relocated to Hobart, Tasmania where it began staging performances in the Salamanca Arts Centre, initially focused on Australian stories. In 1987, with the backing of public funding through the Australia Council and Arts Tasmania, Round Earth established a professional programme under the name Zootango Theatre Company, and from 1992 to 1996 they put on annual summer performances of Shakespeare in the Royal Tasmanian Botanical Gardens, however the withdrawal of public funding in 1997 forced Zootango to cease operating.

The highly memorable performances were usually held on balmy January summer evenings surrounded by beautiful garden settings, and included A Midsummer Night's Dream (1992, 1995), As You Like It (1993), The Comedy of Errors (1994), and Twelfth Night (1996). Although Zootango was wound up, in 2001 they were succeeded by the Directions Theatre Company who put on a production of The Merry Wives of Windsor in that year as part of the Hobart Summer Festival, and subsequently revisited Shakespeare plays several times across the following 15 years.

In more recent years, Hobart's Theatre Royal Company has run a "Shakespeare in the Gardens" annual performance in the Royal Tasmanian Botanical Gardens, featuring Much Ado About Nothing in 2026.

=== Shakespeare Under the Stars (Townsville) ===
The Annual Shakespeare Under the Stars in North Queensland first began in 1992, spearheaded by world renowned theatrical director Jean-Pierre Voos. The event has been held in various locations over the years but has found a home in the Queens Gardens, Townsville since 2004. The event is currently produced by local independent theatre company, TheatreiNQ and has been directed by Terri Brabon OAM since 2008.

=== Shakespeare WA (Perth) ===
Western Australia also holds a large Shakespeare in the Park festival in Perth at King's Park Botanical Gardens. The plays for this festival are set to be performed by the same company (Shakespeare WA) through 2014. This festival is usually held from mid January to mid February, and is the largest single theatre event in Western Australia.

== Canada ==
=== A Company of Fools (Ottawa) ===
In 1990, Margo MacDonald and Heather Jopling, rooted in the belief that Shakespeare should be seen and not read, recruited almost a dozen young performers and took to the streets. They derived inspiration from the rogue Elizabethan players that once entertained audiences outdoors at the Globe theatre, named themselves A Company of Fools, and began performing for crowds on the streets of Ottawa. In 1998 the Fools began performing in Ottawa City Parks with college shows, and in 2002 the Fools launched the Torchlight Shakespeare series. Besides mounting an average of two productions a year, the Fools hold three annual events (Twelfth Night Celebration, Valentine's Day Sonnet Delivery, and the Ottawa Theatre Challenge) and are active in the Ottawa community.

=== Freewill Shakespeare Festival (Edmonton) ===
The Freewill Shakespeare Festival, formerly known as the River City Shakespeare Festival was founded in 1989. It is produced by the Edmonton, Alberta-based "Free Will Players" every summer from late June to mid July. The Festival includes full-scale professional productions of two plays by William Shakespeare, as well as Camp Shakespeare

=== Repercussion Theatre (Montreal) ===
Repercussion Theatre has been touring parks throughout Montreal for over 30 years, bringing the classics to people where they live, for free (with donations graciously accepted). They are experienced in providing Shakespeare in the Park across the city, entertaining people who may otherwise not be exposed to live theatre. Repercussion Theatre was founded in 1988, when they played four shows in front of 800 people in Westmount and Beaconsfield, Qc. Now, they perform to over 10,000 people each summer across the island of Montreal and beyond – with a commitment to cultural diversity, gender equity, and infusing Shakespeare's plays with a decidedly Montreal flair. They are the only company in Montreal to consistently produce a Shakespeare production each year. The company's first artistic director was Cas Anvar (followed by Kevin Orr, Paul Hopkins and Amanda Kellock) and the current artistic director is Catherine Savoie.

=== Shakespeare on the Saskatchewan ===
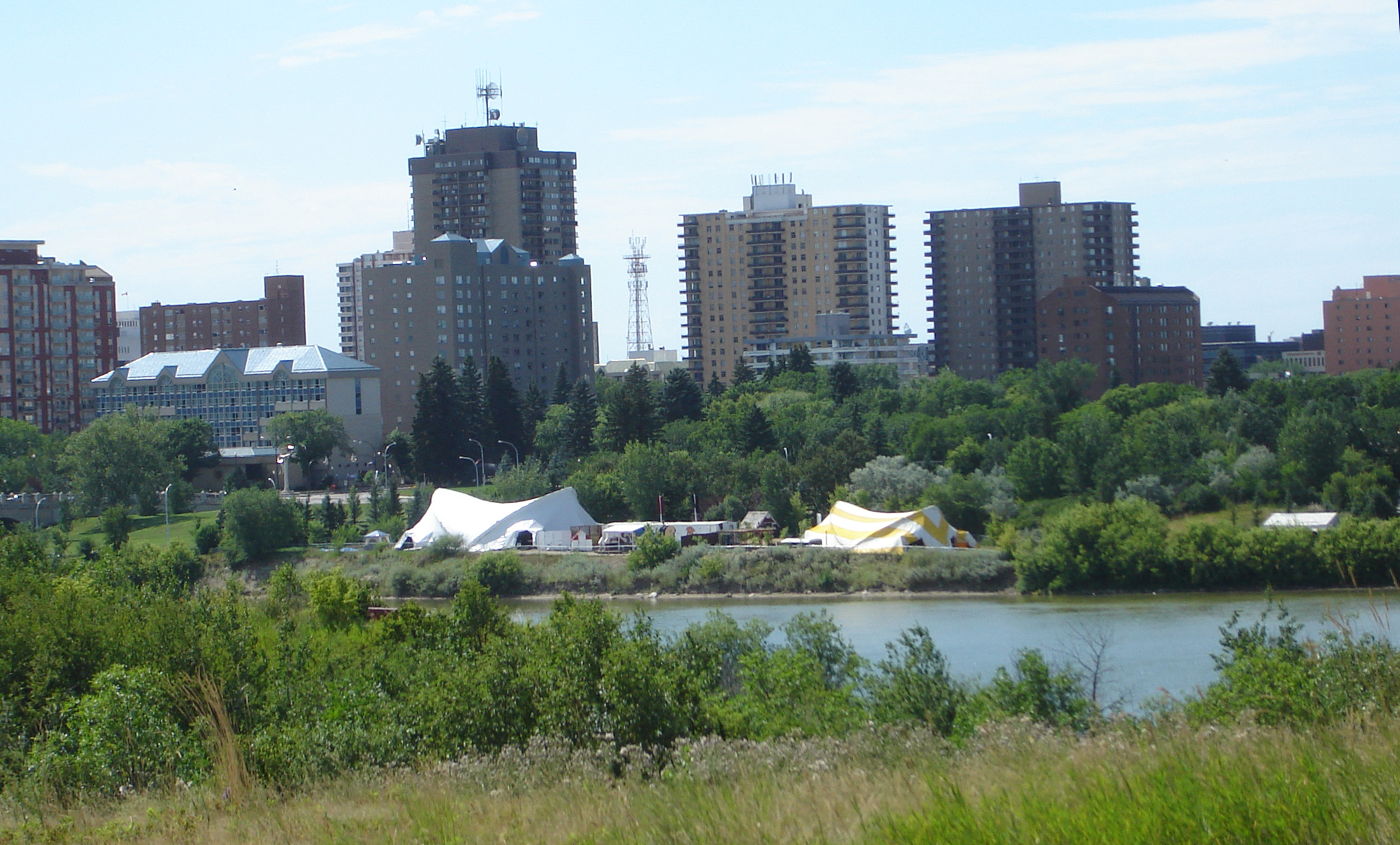
Shakespeare on the Saskatchewan festival tents south of the Mendel Art Gallery on the banks of the South Saskatchewan River

Shakespeare on the Saskatchewan was founded in 1985 in Saskatoon, Saskatchewan. The plays are staged in tents with a seating capacity of approximately 275 on the banks of the Saskatchewan River, and take place from early July to mid-August. The festival traditionally offers two main stage performances and occasionally produces a third offering. The festival sees over 12,000 patrons each year.

=== Shakespeare By The Sea (Halifax) ===
Shakespeare By The Sea (Halifax) is a festival that has been operated in Halifax, Nova Scotia by the Shakespeare by the Sea Theatre Society (SBTS) since 1994. It usually performs in Point Pleasant Park and is regarded as an important part of the cultural scene in Halifax.

=== Shakespeare by the Sea Festival (St. John's) ===
Shakespeare by the Sea (St John's) is a festival operated by Shakespeare by the Sea Festival Inc., a community-based organization that produces and promotes artistic works with a focus on William Shakespeare. It unites seasoned and developing talent and aspires to excel in all aspects. The festival is the longest-running outdoor summer theatre event in the St. John's area. Since 1993, the Shakespeare by the Sea Festival has been performing the works of the famous Bard all around the St. John's area – from the cliff-top meadows of Logy Bay to the historic World War II bunkers at Cape Spear – from the cobblestoned courtyard of the Murray Premises to the lush landscapes of Bowring Park. Since that time, the Festival has grown into a much-anticipated annual event.

=== Shakespeare In The Ruff (Toronto) ===
Shakespeare In The Ruff was born from the ashes from the previous company Shakespeare In The Rough which performed in Toronto's East End neighbourhood of Riverdale between 1994 and 2006. The new company launched in 2012 focuses on creating unique contemporary adaptations of Shakespeare's work and providing opportunities for emerging artists. As part of the company's community work, they run a youth apprenticeship program called the Young Ruffians which pairs up high school students with a member of the professional company for the duration of rehearsals and performances.

=== Shakespeare in the Ruins (Winnipeg) ===
Shakespeare in the Ruins (SIR) is Manitoba's only professional Shakespeare company. The company was founded in 1993 and is noted for its productions at Trappist Monastery Provincial Park.

=== The Bard on the Beach (Vancouver) ===
Bard on the Beach Shakespeare Festival was established in 1990. The plays are staged in Vanier Park on Vancouver's waterfront, in open-ended tents, from the end of May through September. Over the years Bard on the Beach attendance has grown significantly from 6,000 patrons in 1990 to more than 90,000 patrons in 2009. The programming has of course expanded from one play to four, and from 34 performances to 215 two decades later.

=== The Bard's Bus Tour (Ontario) ===
Driftwood Theatre, founded by Jeremy Smith, is Ontario's leading outdoor summer touring theatre company, on the road with The Bard's Bus Tour visiting Ontario communities since 1995. Driftwood Theatre breaks down barriers to experiencing and participating in theatre art by bringing theatre and engagement opportunities to audiences in Ontario who may not have access to professional performance. Over the 28 years that The Bard's Bus Tour ran, productions of Shakespeare plays included: Romeo and Juliet, As you like it, The Tempest, Othello, King Lear, Two Gentlemen of Verona, as well as multiple staging of runs of Macbeth, Much ado about nothing, A Midsummer Night's Dream, and The Twelfth Night. The final Shakespeare play performed by The Bard's Bus Tour was an adapted version of Henry IV Parts 1 & 2 and Henry V, under the name Henry Five in 2022, after a two-year hiatus due to the COVID-19 Pandemic.

Non-Shakespearean offerings

In addition to more traditional Shakespearean fare, Driftwood Theatre also staged a production of The Odyssey in 2013, based on a staging version created by Rick Chafe. The Trafalgar 24 Festival, an event run through the theatre company's Beyond the Bard Initiative to support emerging playwrights with the opportunity to develop short one act plays set for performance in Whitby's historic Trafalgar Castle school. The final performance undertaken by The Bard's Bus Tour was a retrospective of Jeremy Smith's experience as a performer and interpreter of the works of Shakespeare for over 30 years. The one man show made use of several sonnets, songs quotations from the works of Shakespeare. Following the final performance of this show, on August 27, 2023, Driftwood discontinued The Bard's Bus Tour and relocated operations to Prince Edward County, where they shifted to playwright development through the Gillespie House writer retreats.

=== The Dream in High Park (Toronto) ===
The Dream in High Park is the oldest annual outdoor theatre event in Canada, currently entering its 41st season in 2024. Since its inception in 1983, an estimated 1.3 million people have enjoyed the tradition of theatre under the stars. The Canadian Stage Company, who performs the Dream, is nationally and internationally acclaimed, and is Canada's leading not-for-profit contemporary theatre company. It was founded in 1987 with the merger of CentreStage and Toronto Free Theatre, and is dedicated to programming international contemporary theatre, and to developing and producing landmark Canadian works.

== Continental Europe ==
Shakespeare in the Park currently takes place throughout many European countries. In Europe, ever since the Elizabethan period, theatre has been a crucial part of their cultural heritage and history. The Shakespearean performances take place mostly all over Europe from the East to Central Europe.

=== Belgium ===
Brussels Shakespeare Society based in Belgium has been performing "al fresco" productions of Shakespeare's plays since the summer of 1976.

=== France ===
The Footsbarn Theatre Company based in France is a travelling troupe who perform outdoor theatre all over the world.

=== Germany ===
One of the three Globe Theatres is located in Germany and is called "The Globe Neuss". It was founded in 1991 and is famous for its annual International Shakespeare Festival, where companies from all over the world come to perform.

The German city of Bremen hosts The Bremer Shakespeare Company, which features the largest Shakespearean repertoire on a German stage. Performances at Bremen's Bürgerpark are a cultural attraction each year, and the festival also lets guests participate in The Dramatikerwerkstatt – a playwright workshop.

=== Italy ===
In Italy, The Globe Theatre is located within the museum park in Villa Borghese. The stage is a classical "wooden o" structure, reminiscent of the original Globe stage, and is perfect for staging Elizabethan style productions.

=== Poland ===
Theatrum Gedanense Foundation annually organizes the International Shakespeare Festival in Gdańsk, Poland. A week-long festival of outdoor plays and events, the company strives to include not only Polish adaptations of Shakespeare plays, but foreign ones as well.

== New Zealand ==
=== Auckland ===
Shakespeare in the Park has been performed in the outdoor amphitheatre at The PumpHouse Theatre, Lake Pupuke since 1996. incorporating traditional costumes and settings.

=== Wellington ===
Summer Shakespeare has been an annual outdoor theatre event in the capital city, Wellington, since 1983. The large-scale, large-cast productions have taken place in a variety of settings including the Dell in the Wellington Botanic Gardens, Civic Square, Museum of New Zealand Te Papa Tongarewa, onsite at Victoria University and at Gladstone Vineyard in the Wairarapa. Productions have ranged from some of the most popular to some of the most obscure plays in the Shakespeare canon.

== United Kingdom ==
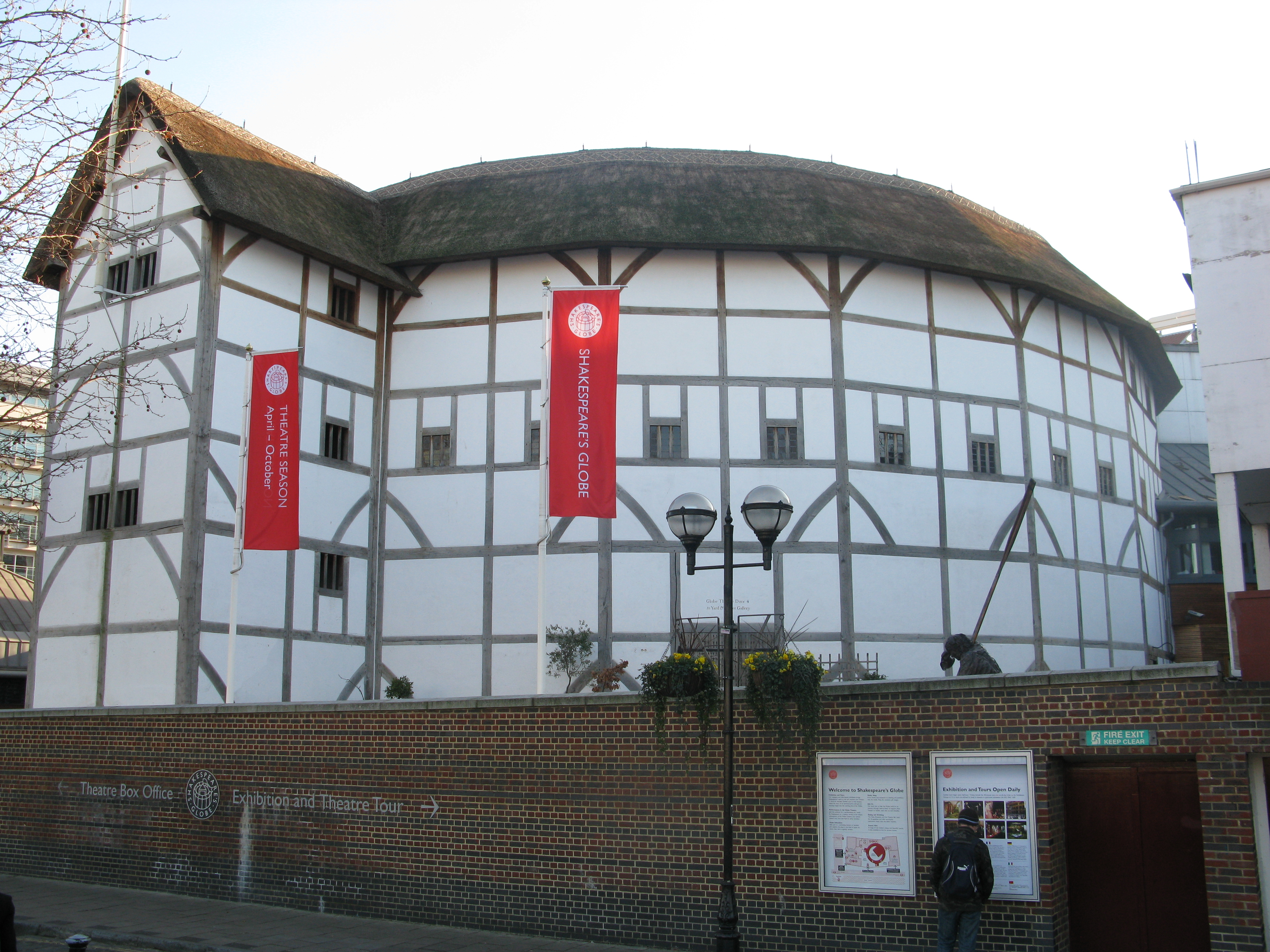
Shakespeare's Globe in London, United Kingdom. The original Globe Theatre, which burnt down in 1613, stood 750ft (230m) from the replica.

The British Shakespeare Company; this Leeds-based festival attracts 15 000 people each summer and is also responsible for helping to initiate a government policy to send "Shakespeare Packs" to school children of all ages and backgrounds, in an effort to introduce Shakespeare at a young age.

London's Regent's Park is a notable location for Shakespeare in the Park due to London being where Shakespeare's plays where originally performed, albeit at the Globe Theatre. The Open Air Theatre was established in 1932 and its first performance was Twelfth Night; the theatre also performs other plays, operas, musicals, and family shows. The theatre is one of the largest auditoria in London and the oldest outdoor theatre in all of Britain, hosting over 130,000 people annually in its sixteen-week season.

The Cambridge Shakespeare Festival; this Festival holds eight plays every summer and is one of the UK's most popular and oldest outdoor Shakespeare companies. Established by David Crilly, it stages authentic Shakespeare in the Cambridge University's college grounds. Audiences can reach up to 1000 people per show, particularly for performances of A Midsummer Night's Dream.

The Willow Globe Theatre; this replica Globe Theatre in Wales is built entirely from living willow trees. It stages productions throughout the summer with an ecological and sustainable focus.

The Minack Theatre; this outdoor amphitheater in Cornwall has views of the sea and stages Shakespeare productions throughout the summer.

== United States ==
=== Albuquerque ===
The New Mexico Shakespeare Festival is a company in Albuquerque, NM that presents professional productions each summer in rep. In its 15th season, the New Mexico Shakespeare Festival is a year-round producing company having split from The Vortex, previously known as "Will Power" in 2010, and "Shakespeare in the Plaza." The New Mexico Shakespeare Festival brings year-round productions of Shakespeare, and his contemporaries to New Mexico.

=== Asheville ===
The Montford Park Players, a community theater company, has been staging free Shakespeare productions in Asheville, North Carolina since 1973. The productions were first staged at a municipal park on Montford Avenue and, in 1993, moved to its current location, the Hazel Robinson Amphitheatre.

=== Boston ===
Commonwealth Shakespeare Company presents professional productions of Shakespeare in Boston Common. The first production was in 1996 at Copley Square; a year later the program was moved to the Common, first at the Parkman Bandstand and more recently at the Parade Ground.

=== Buffalo ===
Shakespeare in Delaware Park was established in 1976 by Saul Elkin. Each summer, Shakespeare in Delaware Park presents two works of William Shakespeare, typically one tragedy or history and one comedy, each running 6 nights per week for 3.5 weeks, for a total of 44 performances. It is held in Buffalo, New York's Delaware Park, on the "Shakespeare Hill".

=== Dallas ===
Inspired by the New York Shakespeare Festival, Robert "Bob" Glenn started The Shakespeare Festival of Dallas in 1971 as a free summer Shakespeare Festival. Renamed Shakespeare Dallas in 2005, the company produces three free Shakespeare productions each summer at the Samuel-Grand Amphitheatre in Lakewood.

=== Denver ===
The Foothills Theatre Company has been staging Shakespeare productions every summer since 2014 in Clement Park, located in Littleton, a suburb SW of Denver.

=== Edmonds ===
Ballinger Shakespeare Company had its inaugural production of free Shakespeare in the Park at Mathay-Ballinger Park in Edmonds, a suburb of Seattle, Washington, in 2025.

=== Johnstown ===
Band of Brothers Shakespeare company has been producing Shakespeare plays every year in Stackhouse Park since 1992, under the direction of Laura Gordon with a rotating cast of community members of all ages.

=== Jersey City ===
The Hudson Shakespeare Company, founded by L. Robert Johnson in 1992, features a summer season where the company stages productions for each month of the summer. Besides Shakespeare standards such as Hamlet and A Midsummer Night's Dream, they often produce one to two lesser done productions a season such as The Two Noble Kinsmen, Cardenio and Henry VIII. Based in Jersey City, NJ, they also tour as part of their summer season to other New Jersey locations such as Fort Lee, Hackensack, Kenilworth, Hoboken, West Milford and also to Stratford, CT.

=== Kansas City ===
The Heart of America Shakespeare Festival was founded by Tony winning Broadway producer Marilyn Strauss in 1993 at the urging of Joe Papp with a production of The Tempest in Southmoreland Park. In 1998, they began to produce two productions per year, with a total of 23 production at the start of the 2011 season.

=== Los Angeles ===
The Independent Shakespeare Co., or Indie Shakes, has produced free summer Shakespeare in Los Angeles area parks since 2003. They performed at Barnsdall Art Park from 2003 to 2009, and have performed at Griffith Park since 2010. In addition, they perform indoors year-round.

=== Louisville ===
Kentucky Shakespeare Festival is a non-profit, professional theatre company in Louisville, Kentucky that produces and performs the works of William Shakespeare. The main productions offered are the annual summer series of plays presented free to the public at Central Park. This series, commonly called "Shakespeare in Central Park", sprung from an initial production in the park by The Carriage House Players in the summer of 1960. They also perform shows in other venues, as well as conduct educational programs related to acting and other theater-related skills.

=== Miami ===
The Florida Shakespeare Theatre is the only Shakespeare company that produces Shakespeare in the Park in mid winter. Every January, since 2005, the Florida Shakespeare Theater presents free Shakespeare in the Park productions in Miami-Dade, Broward and Palm Beach counties. Noted for their educational programming and public outreach, the FST fulfills their mission of providing open and equal access to classical theater.

=== Minneapolis/St. Paul ===
Classical Actors Ensemble has performed free outdoor Shakespeare in metro parks each summer since 2014 as well as touring educational productions into secondary schools each spring.

=== Montana Shakespeare in the Parks ===
Montana Shakespeare in the Parks (MSIP) is a traveling production company affiliate of Montana State University in Bozeman, Montana. MSIP produces the largest and longest-running Shakespeare in the Park production each year, with free shows in more than 65 communities across Montana, Idaho, Washington, North Dakota, and Wyoming. The company produces two shows each year (a comedy and a tragedy), alternating shows between communities. The MSIP season traditionally begins in May and ends in September with shows in Bozeman. MSIP also produces workshops and interactive plays for K-12 students. MSIP celebrated their 50th anniversary in 2022.

=== Nashville ===
The Nashville Shakespeare Festival presents free Summer Shakespeare productions in Nashville, Tennessee and Franklin, Tennessee every year in August and September. Winter Shakespeare takes place in January and February and often focuses on Shakespeare's works that are studied in schools across Tennessee. Founded in 1988, NSF has focused on making Shakespeare accessible to all communities through free and reduced-price tickets and rich educational offerings.

=== New York City ===
The original Shakespeare in the Park was founded in 1954 by Joseph Papp as the New York Shakespeare Festival, which eventually led to free public performances in Central Park. Since 1961 an outdoor amphitheatre, the Delacorte Theatre, has accommodated these productions. Many celebrity actors have worked the Delacorte. People often line up in the morning to assure tickets for the evening performance. Many seasons have featured works by other playwrights, including Bertolt Brecht and Samuel Beckett.

=== Omaha ===
Alan Klem, an assistant professor at Creighton University, and Dr. Cindy Phaneuf, then an Assistant Professor of Dramatic Arts at the University of Nebraska at Omaha, founded Nebraska Shakespeare in 1986. Klem previously helped found Shakespeare in the Park in Ft. Worth, Texas. Nebraska Shakespeare presented free performances each summer; shows were staged in Elmwood Park, which borders University of Nebraska Omaha. In the fall, Nebraska Shakespeare also toured shorter versions of Shakespeare's plays to schools across Nebraska. Nebraska Shakespeare disbanded in November 2022.

=== Philadelphia ===
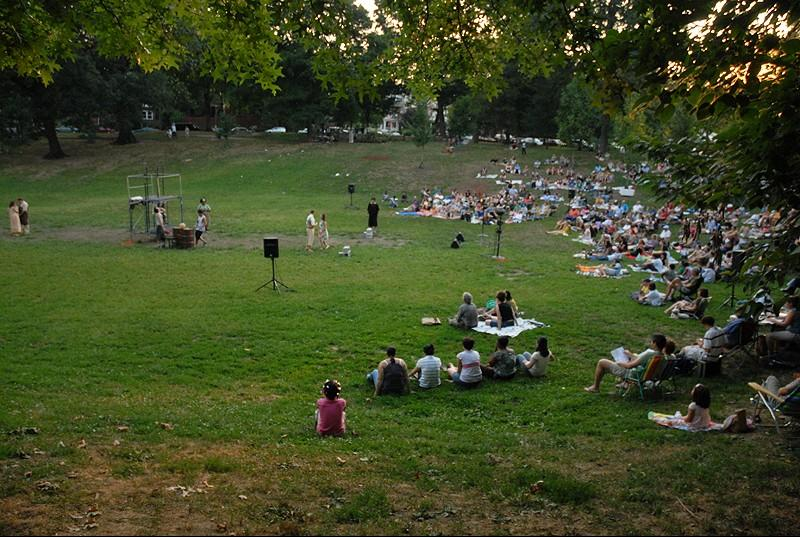
Shakespeare's Romeo and Juliet production in Clark Park

This Philadelphia theatre company offers the largest, free outdoor production of Shakespeare's plays in the greater Philadelphia area. Shakespeare in Clark Park was formed in the fall of 2005 by Marla Burkholder, Maria Möller, Tom Reing and Whitney Estrin. In their inaugural season, Shakespeare in Clark Park presented four performances of Twelfth Night, drawing an audience of over 2,000 people. Those audiences have grown to over 5,000 and the annual show has become a staple of summer in Philly.

=== Pittsburgh ===
Jennifer Tober founded Pittsburgh Shakespeare in the Parks in 2005. Their performances are free and utilize various public parks in the Pittsburgh area.

=== Portland, Oregon ===
The Original Practice Shakespeare Festival (OPSFest) stages free Shakespeare productions across the Portland area in July and August each year: three per week, all different plays. The productions are described as "improv-ish"; there are no formal rehearsals, the actors read their parts off of scrolls they each carry, and audience participation is encouraged.

=== Rochester ===
The Rochester Community Players have staged free Shakespeare productions at the Highland Bowl in Highland Park each July since 1997.

=== Saint Louis ===
St. Louis Shakespeare Festival began in 2001 and produced the first annual free Shakespeare festival in Forest Park with a production of Romeo and Juliet. Since the initial two-week run that attracted 33,000 audience members, the Festival has grown into a year-round institution producing over 250 public performances annually for nearly 100,000 patrons and students.

=== San Francisco ===
Free Shakespeare in the Park began in San Francisco in 1983, with its debut production of The Tempest in Golden Gate Park. Produced every year in San Francisco, Pleasanton, Cupertino, Redwood City, and, beginning in 2023, Orinda from July through September, this program stages professional theater free of charge throughout the San Francisco Bay Area.

=== San Pedro ===
Shakespeare by the Sea was launched in 1998 by Producing Artistic Director Lisa Coffi. It presents free Shakespeare productions in San Pedro, Los Angeles and throughout Los Angeles, Orange and Ventura Counties.

=== Seattle ===
Since 1989, GreenStage has been producing free Shakespeare in major parks in and around Seattle. In 2014, they completed the entire Shakespeare canon.

In 1994, a theater company called the Wooden O started annual summer Shakespeare performances at the Luther Burbank Amphitheater on Mercer Island, Washington. In later years park venues including Lynnwood, Washington and Auburn, Washington were added. In the spring of 2008 the Seattle Shakespeare Company merged with Wooden O and continues to present free Shakespeare productions throughout the Puget Sound region.

=== South Dakota ===
The South Dakota Shakespeare Festival (SDSF) was formed in 2011 and launched its inaugural season in Vermillion, South Dakota, in June 2012. Since the summer of 2012 the SDSF has been offering fully produced professional Shakespeare performances in Vermillion's Prentis Park and daytime arts educational offerings for youth and adults.

=== Saint Mary's, KS ===
The The Flint Hills Shakespeare Festival was formed in 2010 and launched its inaugural season in Saint Mary's Kansas, in September 2010. Each fall the festival transforms a wood affectionately known as Sir William Hollow into an outdoor Shakespearean Amphitheater and Festival. The festival is located on the historic grounds of St. Mary's College in St. Marys, Kansas.

=== Tallahassee ===
The Southern Shakespeare Festival occurs annually in Tallahassee, Florida. The festival's first incarnation existed from 1995 to 2000. In 2012 a group of scholars saw an opportunity to revive the free outdoor festival at the award-winning Cascades Park.

=== Westfield, NJ ===
Troupe of Friends offers free outdoor Shakespearean performances in Westfield, New Jersey. The shows are typical staged at Mindowaskin Park on Labor Day weekend. The company was formed in 2006 by Artistic Director Joseph Penczak. Among the shows they have produced are The Comedy of Errors, Twelfth Night, Henry IV Part One, Julius Caesar, The Merry Wives of Windsor, Richard 2, The Taming of the Shrew, King Lear, Waiting For Godot, and Endgame.

=== Others ===
- The Hudson Warehouse present free Shakespeare and other productions at the Soldiers' and Sailors' Monument in Riverside Park.
- New York Classical Theatre present free Off Broadway Shakespeare productions in New York City's Central Park, Battery Park, Brooklyn Bridge Park, and Carl Schurz Park among other locations. At the end of each scene, audience members participate by following the actors to a new space in the venue.
- Coos Bay Shakespeare in the Park presents a free Shakespeare production in Coos Bay, Oregon's Mingus Park each year.
- The Mississippi Shakespeare Festival presents free Shakespeare performances in downtown Jackson and contemporary productions in venues throughout the state.

== See also ==
- Kentucky Shakespeare Festival
- Oklahoma Shakespeare in the Park
- Hudson Warehouse
- Nashville Shakespeare Festival
