= Jennifer Wynne Webber =

Canadian writer, actor, producer

Jennifer Wynne Webber (born in Ottawa, Ontario) is a Canadian writer, actor, dramaturge, journalist, and television producer currently living and working on Vancouver Island, British Columbia.

== Career ==
Webber has a Master of Fine Arts (MFA) in Creative Writing from the University of British Columbia and a degree in history from the University of Saskatchewan.

Her most well-known work to date is her play With Glowing Hearts: How Ordinary Women Worked Together to Change the World (And Did) about Canadian miners' wives in Kirkland Lake, Ontario who were galvanized into becoming labour activists. Their role in the labour strike of 1941–1942 was crucial in changing Canadian labour laws to require employers to recognize and bargain with unions. Originally, the play was commissioned in 2016 by Elizabeth Quinlan at the University of Saskatchewan to create an original work based on the role of women in Canada's labour movement, which was one of Quinlan's areas of research.

An early one-act version of the play was named "Best of the Fest" at the Saskatoon Fringe Theatre Festival in 2016. A new full length version was named "Outstanding Original Script" at the 2019 Saskatoon and Area Theatre Awards (SATAs). Webber is a member of the Playwrights Guild of Canada.

Barb Byers, Member of the Order of Canada, former Secretary-Treasurer of the Canadian Labour Congress praised Webber for With Glowing Hearts: How Ordinary Women Worked Together to Change the World (And Did): “Your heart will glow with pride in our history and fill with hope for our future... Go celebrate this true story and leave inspired and challenged.” A reading of With Glowing Hearts was held on March 5, 2020 at the University of Saskatchewan as part of an advance celebration of International Women's Day organized by the University of Saskatchewan Faculty Association (USFA).

A staged reading of her play Wild Geese, directed by David Mann and presented by TheatreOne, was held at the Port Theatre lobby in Nanaimo, British Columbia in June 2019. The play is based upon her experience caring for her mother.

Webber's first book was a novel entitled, Defying Gravity, published in 2000 by Coteau Books. It tells the story of Miranda, a television news producer from Edmonton, who ends up on a life-changing road trip with a young East Indian who is planning to enter the priesthood, and the story also features a refugee from the Rwandan genocide. In her review of the novel for the Quill & Quire, Barbra Leslie wrote, "It recounts a cynical woman's search for spiritual or religious meaning, and it's good: a dry, quiet Canadian Beat tale." Defying Gravity was nominated for three Saskatchewan Book Awards, including Book of the Year.

Webber has also worked extensively in broadcast journalism and video production. For 13 years she worked for The Canadian Broadcast Company (CBC). Webber co-hosted "Alberta Express," a popular, award-winning provincial CBC television program, and in the mid 1990s she worked for CBC Television in Calgary, covering the arts.

== Works ==
=== Plays ===
- Beside Myself, 2001
- Peaches & Cream, 2005
- White Lies, 2014 (Formerly titled "Whistling at the Northern Lights" and "Memento Mori")
- With Glowing Hearts: How Ordinary Women Worked Together to Change the World (And Did), 2019

=== Fiction ===
- Defying Gravity, (novel) 2000
- Criatura (short story), The Fieldstone Review, Number 2 (April 2007)

== Theatre Acting Roles ==
- Lily in Danceland, Garry Theatre, Calgary, 1996
- Jacquenetta and Katherine in Love's Labour Lost, Shakespeare on the Saskatchewan, Saskatoon, 2001
- Mistress Page in The Merry Wives of Windsor, Shakespeare on the Saskatchewan, Saskatoon, 2001
- Valerie in The Weir, Arts Club Theatre Company, Vancouver, 2002
- Gertrude in Hamlet, Shakespeare on the Saskatchewan, Saskatoon, 2002
- Dol Common in The Alchemist, Shakespeare on the Saskatchewan, Saskatoon, 2002
- Emma in Real Estate, Centaur Theatre, Montreal, 2005

== Awards ==
- "One of Canada's Top Five New Plays" Neue Theaterstücke aus Kanada (playwrighting competition in Berlin, Germany), 2007
- SATAward for "Outstanding Original Script" (Saskatoon and Area Theatre Awards), Winner, 2019
- SATAward for "Outstanding Production," Winner, 2019
- "Best of the Fest," Saskatoon Fringe Theatre Festival, 2019
- Saskatchewan Book Awards, "Book of the Year," Nominee, 2000
- Saskatchewan Book Awards, "First Book," Nominee, 2000
