= Sacramento Shakespeare Festival =

Theatre festival in Sacramento, California

The Sacramento Shakespeare Festival is an annual Shakespeare festival produced by City Theatre at Sacramento City College in Sacramento, California, United States. The Sacramento Shakespeare Festival was established in 1966 with performances outdoors at the William A Carroll Amphitheatre at William Land Park, a Works Progress Administration project.
