= The Parent Zone =

1989 American television special

The Parent Zone is a TV special on WSMV-TV in Nashville, Tennessee, based on the characters created by David Van Hooser for his TV series The Steve Spots.

Starring actors Chambers Stevens and Betsy Sullenger the special dealt with the breakup of a teenage romance. The character of Steve was originally a thirty six episode television show that aired on WSMV. After the cancellation of the show the television station received many complaints. Eventually WSMV brought back the characters and The Parent Zone aired in July 1989.
