= Darkhorse Theater =

Coordinates: 36.15245°N 86.84329°W

Darkhorse Theater is a performing arts venue in Nashville, Tennessee, which hosts performances across different disciplines, including theater, music, and dance. Formerly a Presbyterian church, the facility seats 136 people.

== History ==
Darkhorse Theater was established in 1989 by three couples: Shannon Wood and Peter Kurland, Myke Mueller and Mary Jane Harvill, and Denice Hicks and Bruce Arntson. Darkhorse Theater combines professional, incubator, and community theaters with eight member companies: ACT I, Sista Style, Destiny Theatre Experience, Actor's Bridge, KB Productions, Tennessee Playwrights Studio, Music City Theatre, and Humanity Theatre Project.

It merged with the Nashville Shakespeare Festival and produced the main stage season at Darkhorse Theater, and Shakespeare in Centennial Park. When Darkhorse Theater and the Nashville Shakespeare Festival restructured in 1995, Shannon and Peter continued to run the Theater.

=== Production history ===
2015 Broken Boys, Destiny Theatre Experience
2015 Daddy's Dying, Act 1
2015 For Colored Girls, SistaStyle
2015, Cultural Millennium, Dream 7
2015 Fifth of July, Act 1
2015 Extremities, KB Productions
2015 GRRRL's Night Out, Actors Bridge
2015 Cupidlicious, Real Life Players
2015 Take Me Out, Act 1
2015 Starlite Waltz, Groundworks
2015 Dog Sees God, Act 1
2015 2 South, Dream 7
2015 Ten Minute Plays, Rebekah Durham
2015 Trailer Trash Housewife, KB Productions
2015 Del Shores, Del Shores Productions
2015 Umbrella, New Modern Songs
2015 Husted Dance, Husted Dance
2015 Last Five Years, VWA Theatricals
2015 Face of Emmett Till, SistaStyle
2015 Music City Burlesque, Music City Burlesque
2015 Dreams Within a Dream 2, Dream 7
2015 Mandela, Darryl Van Leer
2015 Deathtrap, Act 1
2015 Stereo-type, Destiny Theatre Experience
2015 August: Osage County, Act 1
2016 The Flu Season, Act I
2016 Lysistrata, Act I
2016 Ten Minute Playground, TMPG
2016 4000 Miles, Music City Theatre Company
2016 Go From Here
2016 Coffeehouse, Darkhorse
2016 Come Back to the Five and Dime, Act I
2016 Trapped, Planned Parenthood
2016 Psycho Beach Party, Music City Theatre Company
2016 The Complete Word of God, Distraction Theater
2016 November, KB Productions
2016 Husted Dance, Husted Dance
2016 143, Destiny Theatre Experience
2016, Fringe Festival, Actors Bridge
2016 The World's a Stage, Jim Manning
2016 HUEmanity, Destiny Theatre Experience
2016, Shades of Black Festival, Shades of Black
2016 Arsenic and Old Lace, Act I
2016 PG13 Players
2016 Failure: A Love Story, Actors Bridge
2016 A Lie of the Mind, Act I
2016 Christmas Carol, SistaStyle
2017 Month of Outrage, Darkhorse and Actors Bridge
2017 Ten Minute Playground, TMPG
2017 Detroit 67, Actors Bridge
2017 Angels in America, Act I
2017 Yellow Man, Destiny Theatre Experience
2017 Crazy All These Years, Woodland
2017 Noises Off, Act I
2017 Goblin Market, Cabus/Jewell
2017 Reefer Madness, Act I
2017 Waters Edge, KB Productions
2017 Husted Dance, Husted Dance
2017 Motherfucker With The Hat, Destiny Theatre Experience
2017 Fringe Festival, Actors Bridge
2017 The Drowning Girls, Distraction
2017 Louie and Ophelia, SistaStyle
2017 Come Go With Me, Michael McClendon
2017 Sunset Baby, Kennie Playhouse Theatre
2017 Chasing Jeremy, SistaStyle
2017 Essays, Dream 7
2017 No Child, Destiny Theatre Experience
2017 Battered Not Broken, Berg and Rawlings
2017 Love Loss and What I Wore, Act I
2017 Snatched, Loree Gold and Darkhorse
2017 The Curious Picnic, Theatre Craft
2017 Laughter on the 23rd Floor, Act I
2017 Dolly's Wrap O Rama, Theatre Craft
2017 Christmas Bae, SistaStyle
2018 Sunset Baby, Kennie Playhouse Theatre
2018 Stick Fly, Destiny Theatre Experience
2018 Chasing Jeremy, SistaStyle
2018 Pillowman, Act I
2018 Pill Hill, Destiny Theatre Experience
2018 Almost Maine, Chaffins Barn
2018 Little Foxes, Act I
2018 Six Characters in Search of a Play, KB Productions and Darkhorse
2018 Measure For Measure, Act I
2018 The D, Destiny Theatre Experience
2018 Cry It Out, SistaStyle
2018 Shades of Black Festival, Shades of Black
2018 A Bella Noir, Patriq James
2018 Comedy Showcase, Renard Hirsch
2018 Shackled Feet, Shades of Black
2018 Terence Cirvant French, Shades of Black
2018 Hidden Voice, Shades of Black
2018 Stupid Fucking Bird, Act I
2018 Building The Wall, Darkhorse
2018 PG13 Players
2018 It Cant Happen Here, Humanity Theatre Project
2018 Fan Me With a Brick, Tennessee Playwrights Studio
2018 The Odd Evangelical, Tennessee Playwrights Studio
2018 NEC COMPUNCTI, Tennessee Playwrights Studio
2018 Black and Blue, Tennessee Playwrights Studio
2018 The Wolves, Actors Bridge
2018 Kingdom, Tennessee Playwrights Studio
2018 Holiday Bae, SistaStyle
2019 The Romancers, Act I
2019 Steal Away, SistaStyle
2019 Bomb-itty of Errors, Act I
2019 Sweat, Humanity Theatre Project
2019 Nowhere Next to Normal, Destiny Theatre Experience
2019 Jack and the Giant, Act I
2019 Writers in Conversation, Andrew McFadyen-Ketchum
2019 A Million Breaths, Sarkaut Taro
2019 Violent Delights, Act I
2019 Roe, Humanity Theatre Project
2019 Act Like a GRRRL, Actors Bridge
2019 Maidens, Tennessee Playwrights Studio
2019 23/1, Destiny Theatre Experience
2019 Papa Was, Destiny Theatre Experience
2019 Writers in Conversation, Andrew McFadyen-Ketchum
2019 Fringe Festival, Actors Bridge
2019 Holding The Man, KB Productions
2019 Writers in Conversation, Andrew McFadyen-Ketchum
2019 Shades of Black Festival, Shades of Black
2019 Anthology, Dream 7
2019 SistaSpeak, SistaStyle
2019 Shackled Feet, Shades of Black
2019 Papa Was, Destiny Theatre Experience
2019 Nightmarium Incident, Act I
2019 PG13 Players
2019 Writers in Conversation, Andrew McFadyen-Ketchum
2019 Distracted, Act I
2019 The Last Season, Kennie Playhouse Theatre
2019 One Last Song for Christmas, SistaStyle
2020 24 Hour Theater Project, Music City Theatre Company
2020 O The Lies We've Told, Act I
2020 Rosa and Leo, Act I
2020 The Ties That Bind, Act I
2020 The Interview, Act I
2020 Strumento, Act I
2020 The Waiting Room, Act I
2020 Thump in the Night, Act I
2020 Untethered, Act I
2020 The Dictators Daughter, Act I
2020 Boos Black History Blues, SistaStyle
2020 Six Triple-Eight, SistaStyle
2020 Who Will Sing For Lena, SistaStyle
2020 Keely and Due, Act I

== Resident Theaters ==
Darkhorse resident performing groups include ACT I, Sista Style, Destiny Theatre Experience, Actor's Bridge, KB Productions, Tennessee Playwrights Studio, Music City Theater, Humanity Theatre Project, Dream 7 and Kennie Playhouse Theatre.

== Additional Theater Companies ==
Many theater companies have performed at Darkhorse Theater:

- The Nashville Shakespeare Festival
- Groundworks
- Mockingbird Public Theatre
- The Eggplant Fairy Players
- The Real Life Players
- Tennessee Repertory Theatre
- Bad Egg Productions
- Theatre of Dreams
- Willful Women
- Carpetbag Theatre
- Wood and Strings Puppet Theater
- PG13 Player
- Spontaneous Combustion
- Western Eyes Productions
- Blue Moves
- Global Education Center
- Theatre Craft
- Green Room
- People's Branch Theatre
- Rhubarb Theatre
- Circle Players
- John Holleman
- Music City Burlesque
- Minton Sparks
- Shining Light
- Collards and Caviar
- Village Cultural Arts
- USN Theatre Guild
- Husted Dance
- Del Shores Productions
- Distraction
- Chaffins Barn
