= Union Theatre (Peterborough, Ontario) =

Coordinates: 44°18′21″N 78°19′18″W

Union Theatre (Peterborough)
- Interactive map of Union Theatre (Peterborough)
- Address: Peterborough, Ontario; Canada
- Current use: Professional and amateur theatre

Construction
- Opened: 1989
- Closed: 1996
- Years active: 1989 to 1996

The Union Theatre was a theatre in Peterborough, Ontario, Canada that existed from 1989 to 1996.

The theatre was established by local theatre artists in 1989. It served as an arts collective serving local and regional theatre, visual arts and musical artists with a focus on helping emerging artists find a place to showcase their talents. The space was primarily a performance space "black box" style theatre but often played host to a variety of performance and installation works.

As a "collective" the space was run by a revolving membership of artists, some of whom have gone on to open larger, more mainstream theatres in Canada, including Robert Winslow, one of the space's founding members who in 1991 started Fourth Line Theatre in Millbrook, Ontario.

== History ==
The Union Theatre was located at 188½ Hunter Street West in a space rumoured to have been an old undertakers facility (this was the inspiration for the weekly semi-improvised show The Coffin Factory). A group of local theatre artists, including Robert Winslow, Trent University professor Ian McLachlan and members of Theatre Trent, along with other performance artists banded together to continue the work they had done in various Peterborough performance endeavors. One stated aim was finding a permanent home for Winslow's company East City Productions which originally made its home in Peterborough's Market Hall Theatre, the home of the Artspace art gallery. In a Peterborough Examiner article in July 2005, Winslow reminisced about the Union Theatre calling it "poverty theatre". Winslow went on to state, "Nobody was making anything, everyone was poor," he says. "We made all the decisions collectively, which was a real challenge, and basically ran the space." In the same article McLachlan said about the Union Theatre: "It may have been a constant struggle to survive, but the productions that came out of the Union were some of the most innovative this community has seen. "There were very exciting productions done on a minuscule budget."

The space closed its doors on Hunter Street in 1995 and moved to a new home in Peterborough in 1996 where they only remained for one year. In 2006 a group of local artists from the Union Collective began work on opening a new theatre space with the same artist-run focus. The Theatre Users Group formed in the summer of 2006 under the acronym "T.H.U.G." and later in 2007 finding a new space called The New Theatre, hoping to emulate much of the spirit and ideal of the Union Theatre in its heyday.

In 2000 independent film-maker, An Kosurko, a past collective member, created a 27-minute documentary about the Union Theatre called "Re:UNION" which featured interviews with past collective members, space users, and local arts activists. The film also included footage of the space, images of past show posters, and music recorded by bands who had played at the Union Theatre in its heyday. The film takes a non-apologetic look at the ups and downs of working as a collective, paying bills, working with creative spirits and the space's meaning to the Peterborough Arts community.

== Music at The Union ==
The space could also be booked as a space for bands to perform. For a time these were about once a month, but in the last year they were more frequent. Some bands were from local highschools. Others were part of the underground network of DIY punk rock shows. Bands that played included Shotmaker, Antischism, and a local pop punk band, Candywheel.

== Interesting facts ==
- Peterborough New Dance staged some of its early shows, including early runs of its Emergency new dance shows.
- Space's first show Can You See Me Yet by Canadian playwright, Timothy Findley was staged in November 1989 and was attended by Findley himself as he was at the time living in Cannington, Ontario, about 30 minutes East of Peterborough. The show was directed by John Barclay.
- The space ran monthly "Writers in the Round" songwriter shows where Canadian songwriters would share their newest works "in the round" with four or five other artists in front of a live audience.
- Weekly "Improv Soaps" were developed using serial-style episodic story lines featuring recurring characters. The series The Coffin Factory was inspired by the (supposed) history of the space while the series "Hurricane Ridge" was loosely based on the Twin Peaks television show. Other series included a noir detective series called One Red Shoe, a series called The Seven Deadly Sins where the characters each embodied one of the biblical seven deadly sins or four cardinal virtues, Biosphere 2013 a dystopian, near future science fiction black comedy, as well as Masquerade and Ascension, a fantasy horror series and a mini-series based on the roleplaying game worlds of Vampire: The Masquerade and Mage: The Ascension. During the summer of 1991 a development series called "The Cactus Hotel" was run for new improvisers.
- Shows sought funding through a number of sources including government grants and student-based funding from Theatre Trent (Trent University).
- The space ran a soup kitchen run by a number of the artists as well as a late night coffee house.
- The Union Theatre was noted in Anne Russell's edition of Aphra Behn's The Rover as one of a selection of small theatres in the 20th century to produce the rarely produced Restoration comedy script.

== Collective space ==
Collective members met bi-weekly to decide issues of space use, booking of shows, space upkeep and funding. Since the space was a not-for-profit organization it relied completely on the 50% of its door proceeds for its success. The Union Theatre received ongoing funding from a number of individuals and Theatre Trent. Different shows received funding from the City of Peterborough's Arts and Culture committee as well as from The Canada Council and The Ontario Arts Council. Funding also came from private donors, fund raising shows and dances, as well as lucrative all-ages dance shows that were based on the Rave movement with all-night dancing and music. Despite an always-full schedule of events, the space still struggled for survival and was often on the verge of closure - see "Union Theatre Losing its Home" below in Selected Posters and Articles.

Following the tenets of Consensus decision-making, collective meetings often took well over three hours to cover items ranging from general upkeep of the space to which funding bodies to canvass for funding. Each meeting had a revolving "facilitator" who was expected to organize the flow of ideas, encourage respectful interaction, manage the meeting's timeline, summarize ideas, move towards consensus and follow the agenda.

To be a member of the Union Theatre, artists need only to have attended meetings. One could attend meetings regularly or sporadically, but were required to attend each meeting during pre-production and the show's run if one was the producer or director of a specific piece. While there were certain members who "held the keys" to the space at all times and who had signing rights on the group's bank account, each member of the collective was provided access to the space at any time, provided bookings were pre-set at a collective meeting.

== Season brochures ==
Starting in the summer of 1990, The Union Theatre published 3 season brochures per year: Summer, Fall and Winter/Spring. These brochures were produced by collective member Fredrik Graver until his departure from Peterborough in the spring of 1993.

- Brochure 1: Summer 1990

With the second season brochure, the collective began naming the seasons. The Fall 1990 season was named "The Only Season", both as a reference to the lack of other theatre in Peterborough and a nod to the nearby Only Café where performers and audiences often ended their nights.

- Brochure 2: The Only Season (fall 1990)
- Brochure 3: The Winter of Our Discontent (winter/spring 1991)
- Brochure 4: Hard Times (summer 1991)
- Brochure 5: fall 1991 (fall 1991)
- Brochure 6: Thumbs Up!(winter/spring 1992)
- Brochure 7: The Canadian Season(summer 1992)
- Brochure 8: The Naked Season (fall 1992)
- Brochure 9: Survival? Season (winter/spring 1993) This brochure marked a departure from the tri-fold single-sheet style to a multi-page booklet.

== Selected posters and articles ==
Poster from Union Theatre's first show, Can You See Me Yet by Canadian playwright Timothy Findley (November 1989)

Poster from Union Theatre's production of The Rover (play) by Aphra Behn (1994), later noted in Ann Russell's edition of the script.

Poster from Union Theatre's 1st Playwright's Competition (September 1992)
- Poster for "The Unconnected Trilogy", a series of one-act plays performed at the Union Theatre in March 1992
- Programme for "The Unconnected Trilogy", performed at The Union Theatre in March 1992
- Poster for theatrical performance of "A Night of One Act Plays" at the Union Theatre, March 13 to 17, 1991 (low-resolution video capture).

== See also ==
- The Rover (play)
