= Twain and Shaw Do Lunch =

Comedic play by Chambers Stevens

Twain and Shaw Do Lunch, formerly known as Shaw and Twain Do Lunch, was written by Chambers Stevens and made its world premiere at Miami's New Theatre in December 2011. It is based on a real meeting between Mark Twain and George Bernard Shaw. The full-length comedic play has won the Fourteenth Annual Long Beach Playhouse New Works Festival in Long Beach, CA, the 2005 Palm Springs International Playwriting Festival for Best Comedy, and has also appeared in the Futurefest at the Dayton Playhouse.
