= Chambers Stevens =

- Born: June 10, 1964; Hendersonville, Tennessee

Chambers Stevens (born June 10, 1964) is an American actor, playwright, author and acting coach. Stevens was the co-founder in 1988 of the Nashville Shakespeare Festival.

== Actor ==
Stevens played the title character in The Steve Spots as well as The Parent Zone.

For PBS he also played the title character in the children’s series Funnybones, as well as the spin-off series Geo-Scout, for which he received an Emmy nomination.,

== Playwright ==
In 1994 Chambers won the Back Stage Garland Award for his play Desperate for Magic a one-man show in which Stevens also starred. In 2019 Chambers wrote four original plays which all premiered at the Hollywood Fringe Festival.

=== Plays ===
- 1989: Desperate for Magic
- 2001: Travels with Jack Lemmon's Dog
- 2005: Twain and Shaw Do Lunch
- 2016 & 2019: It's Who You Know
- 2019: Pho Girl
- 2019: Acid Wash Love
- 2019: ExtraOrdinary
- 2019: Naked Man Rising

== Author ==
- Magnificent Monologues for Kids: Kids’ Monologues for Every Occasion Sandcastle Publishing 1999 ISBN 1-883995-08-6
- 24 Carat Commercials for Kids: Everything Kids Need to Know Sensational Sandcastle Publishing 1999 ISBN 1-883995-09-4
- Sensational Scenes for Teens: The Scene Study-guide for Teen Actors Sandcastle Publishing 2001 ISBN 1-883995-10-8
- Magnificent Monologues For Teens: The Teens’ Monologue Source For Every Occasion! Sandcastle Publishing 2002 ISBN 1-883995-11-6
- Sensational Scenes for Kids: The Scene Study-Guide for Young Actors Sandcastle Publishing 2003 ISBN 1-883995-12-4
- The Ultimate Commercial Book for Kids and Teens: The Young Actors’ Commercial Study-guide Sandcastle Publishing 2005 ISBN 1-883995-13-2
- Magnificent Monologues for Kids 2: More Kids’ Monologues for Every Occasion Sandcastle Publishing 2009 ISBN 1-883995-14-0

== Acting coach ==
Stevens has been an audition coach for young actors since 1990. His clients have appeared on television, film and the Broadway stage.
