= Ian McLachlan (writer) =

Canadian writer and academic

- Education: St Edmund Hall, University of Oxford.
- Occupations: Playwright, novelist, academic, art collector.
- Writing career
- Period: 1960 - present
- Notable work: The Seventh Hexagram

Ian McLachlan is a Canadian writer and academic from Peterborough, Ontario. He is best known for his novel The Seventh Hexagram, which was co-winner with Michael Ondaatje's Coming Through Slaughter of the inaugural Books in Canada First Novel Award in 1976 and a finalist for the Governor General's Award for English-language fiction at the 1976 Governor General's Awards.

After earning a Master of Arts at Oxford University in 1960, McLachlan established the department of comparative literature at the University of Hong Kong before joining the faculty of Trent University in 1970. Before his retirement, McLachlan served as the chair of Cultural Studies department for over 14 years. After The Seventh Hexagram, he published a second novel, Helen in Exile, in 1980.

He has been a prominent figure in the arts and culture of Peterborough, Ontario. His activities have included founding the local publishing company Ordinary Press, serving on the boards of the city's Artspace and Union Theatre, and founding and programming for the Canadian Images Film Festival. With the film festival, he was fined in 1983 for screening A Message from Our Sponsor, a documentary film about subliminal advertising, without approval from the Ontario Censor Board.

As a playwright, his works have included Pioneer Chainsaw Massacre, Postscript, Lear One/One, Frankenstein Meets the Recession, The Orchard, Doctor Barnardo's Children and Wounded Soldiers. His non-fiction works have included Shanghai 1949 and In the Margins of the Empire: Reading Cambodia.

== Works ==
- The Seventh Hexagram (1976)
- Helen in Exile (1980)
- Shanghai 1949 (1989), with Sam Tata
- Lear One/One (1990)
- In the Margins of the Empire: Reading Cambodia (1993)
- The General and the Mother (1995)
- Crow Hill (1997), with Robert Winslow
- The Orchard (1998), with Robert Winslow
- Dr Barnardo's Children (2005), with Robert Winslow
- Ho Chi Minh in Prison (2010)
- Wounded Soldiers (2013), with Robert Winslow
