= The Rover (play) =

1677 play by Aphra Behn

The Rover or The Banish'd Cavaliers
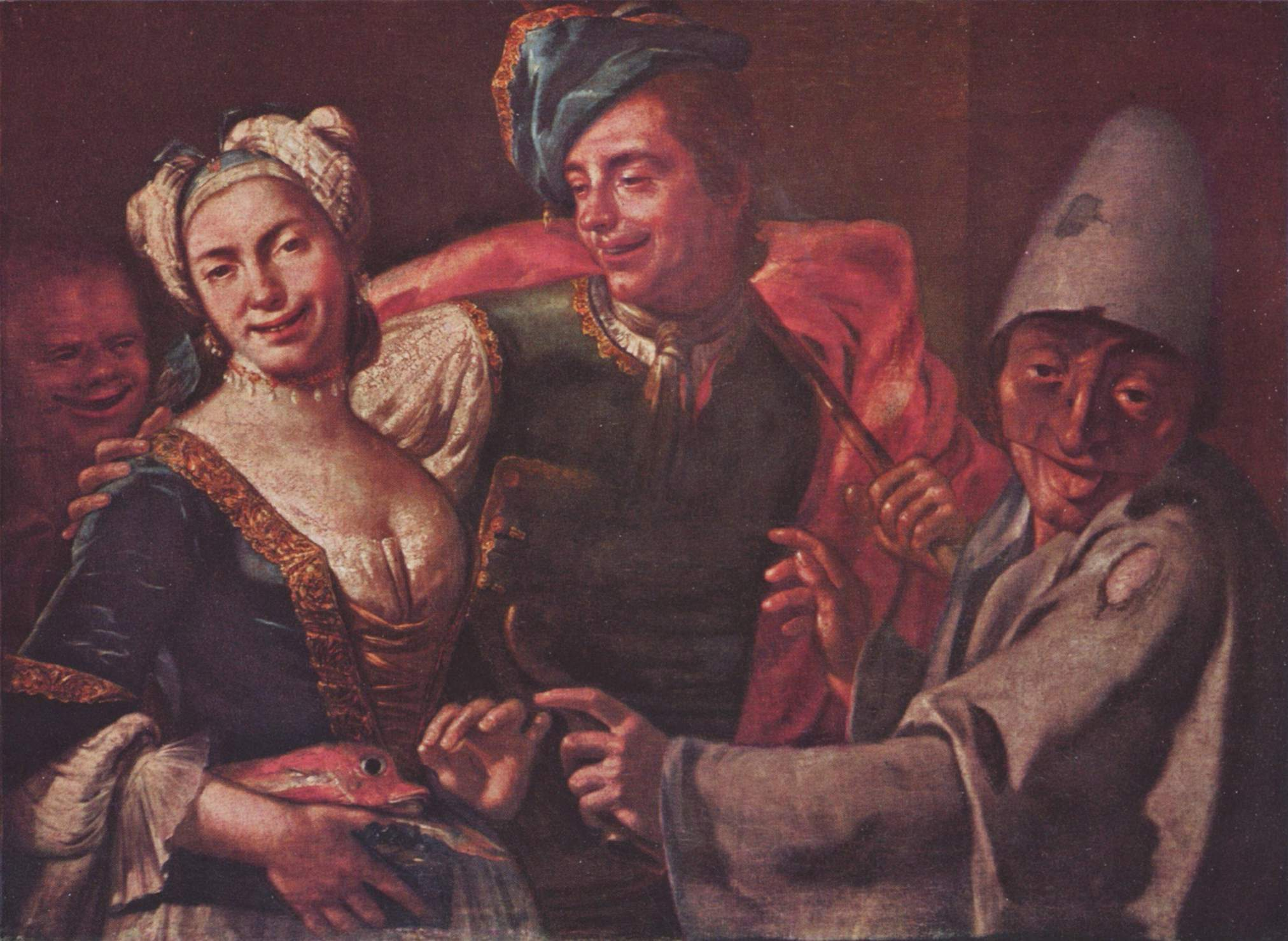
- Masked Revellers by Giuseppe Bonito
- Written by: Aphra Behn
- Genre: Restoration Comedy
- Setting: Carnival time in Naples, Italy during the English Interregnum

Premiere
- Date: 24 March 1677
- Place: Duke's Theatre, Dorset Gardens, London

The Rover or The Banish'd Cavaliers is a play in two parts, written in mixed prose, song lyric, and verse by the English author Aphra Behn. It is a revision of Thomas Killigrew's play Thomaso, or The Wanderer (1664), and features multiple plot lines, dealing with the amorous adventures of a group of Englishmen and women in Naples at Carnival time. According to Restoration poet John Dryden, it "lacks the manly vitality of Killigrew's play, but shows greater refinement of expression." The play stood for three centuries as "Behn's most popular and most respected play."

== Characters ==
=== Women ===
- FLORINDA, Sister to Don Pedro, and Hellena. A very determined woman, Florinda refuses suitors due to her devoted love for Colonel Belville.
- HELLENA, a young Woman designed for a Nun, and Sister to Florinda. A confident, and brave woman like her sister, she questions religion and convinces Willmore to marry her.
- VALERIA, a Kinswoman to Florinda who helps Florinda scheme and hide from Pedro.
- ANGELLICA BIANCA, a famous Courtesan in Spain who returns to Naples to put herself up for sale. Don Pedro and Don Antonio attempt to pay the fee for Angellica, but she falls in love with Willmore, whom she attempts to kill later on in the play.
- MORETTA, the "lady in waiting," or personal assistant, of Angellica Bianca.
- CALLIS, Governess to Florinda and Hellena in charge of overseeing the girls and making sure they stay out of trouble. However, she is easily convinced and is later trapped in a chest so that she can't interrupt the marriage of Florinda.
- LUCETTA, a "jilting wench" who steals the clothes and belongings from Blunt.

¤ In the original 1677 production, Anne Marshall played Angellica Bianca and Elizabeth Barry was Hellena.

=== Men ===
- DON ANTONIO, the King's Son, The Viceroy's Son, who is good friends with Don Pedro.
- DON PEDRO, Florinda and Hellena's brother, a Noble Spaniard, Antonio's Friend.
- BELVILE, an English Colonel deeply in love with Florinda despite the disapproval of her brother, Pedro.
- WILLMORE, the "rover" to whom the title refers; a naval captain who spends most of his days roaming around.
- FREDERICK, English Gentleman, Friend to Belville and Blunt
- BLUNT, a foolish English Country Gentleman who gets duped out of all his possessions by Lucetta.
- STEPHANO, Servant to Don Pedro
- PHILLIPO, Lucetta's Gallant
- SANCHO, Pimp to Lucetta
- BISKEY and SEBASTIAN, two Bravoes to Angelica
- DIEGO, Page to Don Antonio
- PAGE to Hellena
- OFFICERS and SOLDIERS
- SERVANTS, MASQUERADERS, Off-stage VOICES

== Plot ==
=== Act I ===
Sisters Hellena and Florinda's fates have been decided for them by the men in their life, mainly their brother and father. Hellena is to enter the convent after Carnival has ended. Florinda's father wants her to marry elderly Don Vincentio and her brother, Don Pedro, wants her to marry Don Antonio. However, she has feelings for Belville, an English colonel. The women, not approving of these plans, dress up for Carnival in an attempt to avoid their chosen fates.

Belville, Blunt, Frederick, and Willmore are also enjoying Carnival when they run into Florinda, Hellena, and Valeria (their cousin). Willmore and Hellena flirt with one another; Hellena agrees to meet Willmore again later. Meanwhile, Lucetta begins to seduce Blunt. Florinda begins to set up a meeting with Belville when she sees her brother approaching. She hastily gives him a letter and runs off with Hellena and Valeria. Florinda's letter contains instructions for Belville to come to her garden at ten that night and carry her off. Blunt sneaks off with Lucetta.

=== Act II ===
Willmore, Belville, and Frederick go to see Angellica, a famous courtesan. Angellica's servants hang up a portrait of her outside of her house. The Englishmen are astounded by her beauty, but leave when they realise they do not have the money to buy her—one thousand crowns a month. Don Pedro enters and sees the picture and the price. He has the money and runs to fetch it.

Angellica laments that no one has taken her up because of the high price, but when she learns of Don Pedro and Don Antonio, both of whom are rich, she decides to pursue them, then goes back inside. Pedro soon enters from one side of the stage, and Antonio enters from the other; both men are masked. Antonio is also struck by Angellica's portrait and wonders out loud if he could get away with sleeping with Angellica and still marry Florinda. At the mention of Florinda, Pedro recognizes Antonio. They fight. Willmore and Blunt enter and break them up. Pedro challenges Antonio to a duel the next day over Angellica. Antonio accepts.

Meanwhile, Willmore sees a smaller picture of Angellica and tries to steal it. Antonio tells him to put it back. Willmore refuses and says that Antonio has the money to pay for the real thing. Angellica enters just in time to see another fight break out. Angellica asks Willmore to speak with her inside as she was initially very excited and impressed by him. Willmore goes, despite Belville and Frederick's fears that Angellica is angry with him. Willmore tries to persuade Angellica to sleep with him for free. Normally Angellica would not agree to this, but she has fallen in love with Willmore, with his wits and his way. She agrees, despite the warnings from her maidservant Moretta.

=== Act III ===
Hellena says that she is not in love, but she cannot stop thinking about Willmore. The women see Belville, Blunt, and Frederick approach, and eavesdrop on the men. Belville, Blunt and Frederick have come to retrieve Willmore from Angellica because he has been inside with her for two hours. Willmore comes out and brags about having enjoyed Angellica's charms for free.

Hellena, who has seen and heard everything Willmore said, comes out of hiding and pretends as if nothing has transpired. As Willmore begins to flirt with her again, Angellica enters, masked, and sees Willmore betraying the vows he made to her. Hellena finally reveals her face to Willmore, who praises her beauty. This is the last straw for Angellica. She orders one of her servants to find out who Hellena is and storms out. Hellena asks what Willmore was doing in Angellica's house; he denies that anything transpired. Hellena then attacks him, quoting to him what he had just said about Angellica. She makes Willmore promise never to see Angellica again. Meanwhile, Florinda and Valeria are testing Belville's loyalty to Florinda by trying to seduce him while he doesn't know who they are. He stands firm. The women exit, but Florinda leaves Belville with a locket. Belville recognizes Florinda's picture in the locket and resolves to rescue her that night, with Willmore and Frederick's help. Meanwhile, Blunt is tricked out of his money and clothes by Lucetta.

Florinda waits in her garden for Belville wearing a nightgown. Willmore enters, drunk, mistakes Florinda for a prostitute, and tries to persuade her to sleep with him. When she resists he attempts to rape her, but when Belville and Frederick enter, Florinda runs off. Willmore and Belville almost fight, but Frederick intervenes. The noise however, brings Pedro and his servants to the garden. A fight breaks out and the English are driven off.

Willmore tries to explain to a furious Belville that he didn't know who Florinda was and mistook her for a whore. Belville and Frederick leave to find Florinda.

Antonio enters, hoping that his page has paid Angellica so he can sleep with her. Willmore sees this and starts a fight with Antonio. Antonio falls, wounded. Willmore believes he has killed Antonio and runs off. Belville runs in, fearing that it is Willmore who has been hurt. Soldiers enter and arrest Belville, believing him to be the attacker. Antonio finds his strength and orders Belville taken to his house.

=== Act IV ===
Don Antonio does not believe that Belville is innocent of having injured him; however, he offers Belville an alternative to imprisonment. Since Antonio is wounded and cannot duel Pedro, Belville could dress up as Antonio and go instead. Belville agrees, believing the fight to be over Florinda.

Florinda frets that Belville did not come to her window as planned, and fears that the impending duel is between Belville and Pedro. Pedro enters, masked, and reveals that he will be fighting Antonio, relieving some of Florinda's fears. Belville enters, disguised as Antonio. Florinda runs in to stop them. Belville is confused as to why Florinda would defend his rival but they push her away and fight. Florinda stops them again just as Belville disarms Pedro. She begs him spare Pedro. Belville lays his sword at Florinda's feet and swears his love to her. The action redeems him in Pedro's eyes, so he gives his sister to the man he believes to be Antonio, demanding that they get married at once. Florinda protests, but Belville secretly lifts his mask to show her who he is.

Just then, Willmore and Frederick enter. Wilmore greets him by embrace. The embrace makes Belville drop his mask. Pedro now refuses to allow the wedding, since it was Antonio's fight, not Belville's. He drags Florinda away, accusing her of trying to trick him. Belville, furious at being thwarted yet again, turns on Willmore and chases him away. Angellica enters with her servants Moretta and Sebastian, furious that Willmore loves Hellena. Sebastian runs after Willmore to bring him back. Angellica accuses Willmore of having another woman. Willmore, as usual, attempts to charm her back.

Hellena enters disguised as a man. She decides to interfere and approaches Angellica pretending to be one of Hellena's servants. She tells a story about a young girl who fell in love and was left standing at the altar because her lover came to Angellica. Then she reveals the lover to be Willmore. Angellica is moved by the story, Willmore is only excited and impatient to find out who the woman in question is. Suddenly, Willmore recognizes Hellena and figures out what's going on. He turns to Angellica and starts describing Hellena as a Gypsy, ugly, a monkey, etc. He tells Hellena to go back to her mistress. Angellica is outraged with Willmore and vows to take revenge and sends Willmore away. Willmore exits with an aside in which he says he plans to try to win Hellena back.

Florinda and Valeria enter, disguised in different costumes, having momentarily escaped Pedro. Then Don Pedro, Belville, and Willmore enter. Pedro and Belville seem to be having a serious conversation. Willmore follows Florinda when she walks past, again thinking she is a courtesan. Frederick comes in and relates Blunt's misadventures to Belville and Pedro. They all go off to find him. Florinda reenters, still being chased by Willmore. Then Hellena arrives and sees Willmore pursuing this "unknown" woman. She sends a page to find out where they go. Florinda ducks into a door to avoid Willmore; it turns out to be Belville's house. The page Hellena sent goes off to relay the information.

Blunt is staying in Belville's house. Florinda enters, sees Blunt and asks him for help. Blunt then attempts to rape her based on his new contempt for women. Frederick enters, also convinced that Florinda is a prostitute, and joins Blunt. Florinda gives them a diamond ring and asks them to consult Belville. Frederick fears that she might be a lady of some worth and asks Blunt to wait. Blunt is still skeptical but agrees. Frederick locks Florinda in a room.

=== Act V ===
Belville, Willmore, Frederick, and Pedro break into Blunt's room and laugh at him. Blunt says that just a moment before there was a wench in his chamber and shows them the ring Florinda gave him. Belville recognizes the ring as the one he gave Florinda when they exchanged vows. The other men, unaware that the girl is Florinda, decide to let her out and have their way with her. They draw swords to see who has the longest. Don Pedro wins and unlocks Florinda's door.

Florinda runs in, still masked and pursued by Pedro. She is saved when Valeria arrives and persuades Pedro to leave by telling him that Callis knows where Florinda is hiding. Once he is gone, Florinda removes her mask. Valeria tells Belville and Florinda to get married quickly, before Pedro returns. Frederick and Valeria decide to get married as well. Belville sends a boy to fetch a priest. Frederick and Blunt realise that they almost raped Florinda and apologise, returning the ring. Florinda forgives them. Belville, Florinda, Valeria, and Frederick exit to get married; Blunt goes off to see a tailor. Willmore stays behind to guard against Pedro's return.

Angellica enters, pointing a pistol at Willmore; she rages at him while threatening him with the gun. Willmore offers to pay her for her services; she refuses. As she prepares to kill him, Don Antonio enters with his arm in a sling. He takes the gun from Angellica, then recognises Willmore as the man who stole Angellica's picture. He offers to shoot Willmore. Pedro enters. Angellica decides to let Willmore live, and leaves. Don Pedro asks why Don Antonio missed the duel; Antonio tells him what happened, and leaves in a huff. Pedro decides to give Florinda to Belville in revenge. Willmore informs him that the marriage has already occurred. Pedro exits.

Hellena enters, still in boy's clothes, and banters with Willmore, who wants to sleep with her but doesn't want to marry her. Hellena finally convinces him for marriage. Pedro, Belville, Florinda, Frederick, and Valeria enter. They learn of Willmore and Hellena's engagement and Pedro approves, tired of fearing for his sister's honour (virginity). Blunt enters in a Spanish habit, looking ridiculous. Music plays and masquers from Carnival come in dancing. The play ends with vows of love between Hellena and Willmore.

== Background ==
Having famously worked as a spy for Charles II against the Dutch, Behn lost her meagre income when the king refused to pay her expenses. She turned to writing for an income.

Behn was a Royalist, and her works frequently portray Puritans negatively. The subtitle "Banish'd Cavaliers" is a reference to the exile that the Cavalier forces experienced during the English Interregnum.

== Reception ==
The Rover premiered in 1677 to such success that Behn wrote a sequel that was produced in 1681. A popular example of Restoration comedy, the play earned an extended run, enabling Behn to make a fair income from it, receiving the proceeds from the box office every third night.

Willmore (who may have been a parallel to Charles II or John Wilmot, 2nd Earl of Rochester) proved to be an extremely popular character, and four years later Behn wrote a sequel to the play. King Charles II was himself a fan of The Rover, and received a private showing of the play.

Critic Susan Carlson argues that despite much of Behn's work facing harsh criticism, The Rover was "perhaps the least tarnished by critical contention over the originality of her work".

The play was later adapted by Mr. John Phillip Kemble in 1790 in a production called Love in Many Masks. Kemble's version featured three acts instead of the normal five. This was not the only abbreviation applied to Behn's original work. The final cut of Kemble's piece saw most of the plot that was pertaining to sex, removed. Hellena's speech on rape and unwanted marriage was left out, and the part of the plot relating to the near rape of Florinda by Willmore is only implied. Even though this version of Aphra Behn's The Rover was much more polite and politically correct, it still received criticism that "the ideas are constantly indelicate, and the language frequently gross." This resembled the reception that Behn's Rover received as well, and resulted in The Rover disappearing from the stage until the late 1970s.

== Literary criticism ==
Behn has been credited with an improvement in Killigrew's "indulgent and inert" dialogue in the third act of the play.

Derek Hughes and Janet Todd critiqued the play in The Cambridge Companion to Aphra Behn.

== Selected modern performances ==
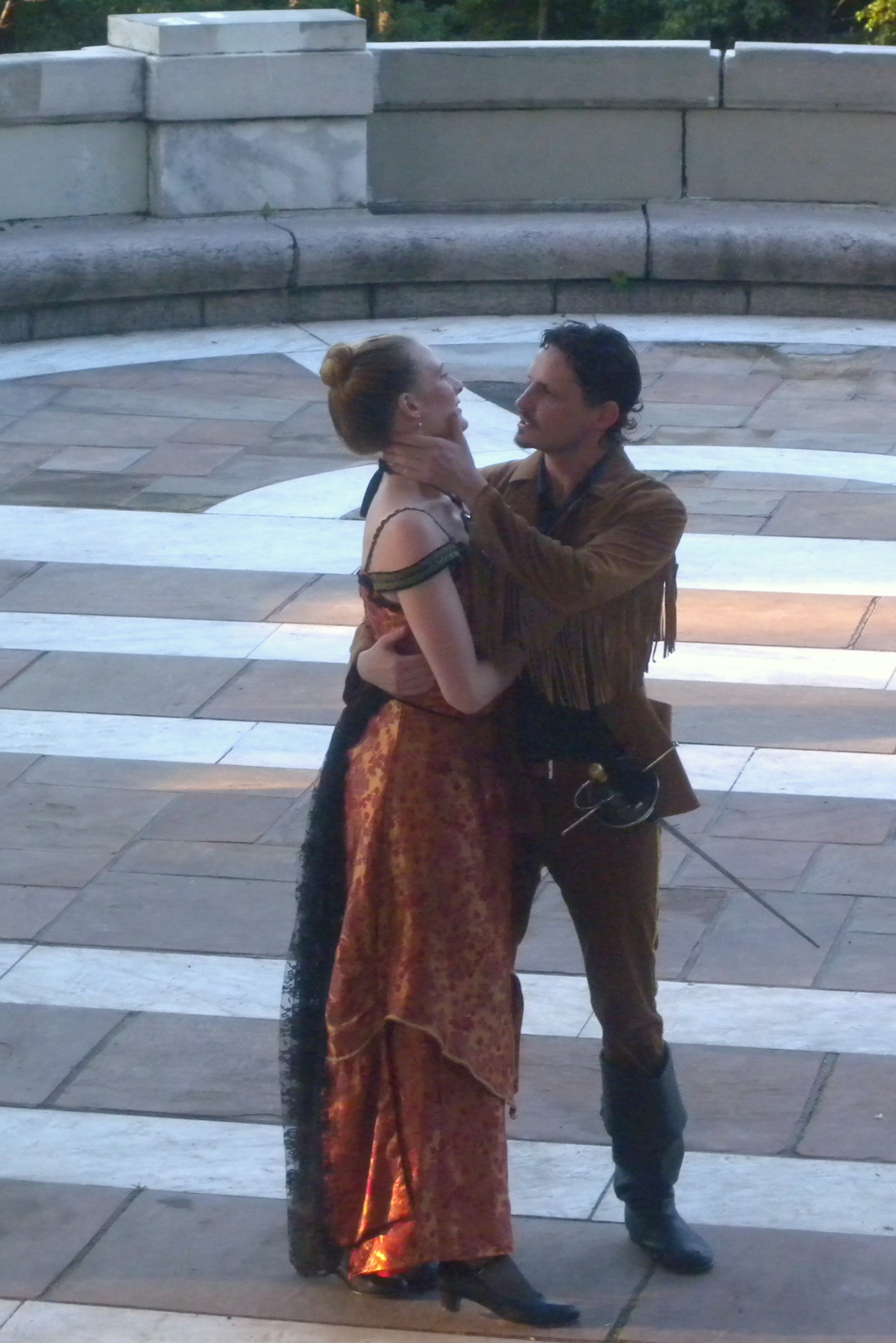
2012 performance of The Rovers at Hudson Warehouse

Despite adaptations by the Royal Shakespeare Company in 1986 (Swan Theatre) and 1987 (Mermaid Theatre in London), where the play's setting was altered to take place in the West Indies, most performances of the script in the past 25 years have been by experimental or smaller troupes. Other noted productions include:

- University of Illinois at Chicago Circle, Circle Theatre Company (1979). Directed by Michael Diamond.
- Folger Theatre Group, Washington (1982).
- Upstream Theatre, London (1984).
- Williamstown Theatre Festival (1987).
- Revel Players, University of Illinois Urbana-Champaign (1990).
- The Union Theatre, Peterborough, Ontario (1994).
- Queen's University Department of Drama, Kingston, Ontario, Canada (2000).
- Festival Playhouse, Kalamazoo College, Kalamazoo, Michigan (2005) Directed by Karen Berthel.
- Griffith University, Gold Coast Campus Stagecraft Production, Australia (2005) Directed by Patrick Mitchell
- Jewell Theatre Company, William Jewell College, Liberty, MO (2006)
- University of New Brunswick, Fredericton, New Brunswick, Canada (2008).
- Weitzenhoffer Theatre, University of Oklahoma (2008).
- Fordham Theatre Company, Fordham College at Lincoln Center (2008) Edited and directed by Michael Goldfried.
- Bank Street Theatre, New School, NYC (2008) Directed by Erica Gould.
- Chinese Culture University, Taipei (2008).
- Bing Theatre, University of Southern California (2009) Directed by Stefan Novinski.
- Center for the Performing Arts, Illinois State University (2009) Directed by Chris Garcia Peak.
- Department of Theater, Dance & Film, Franklin & Marshall College, Lancaster, Pennsylvania (2009) Directed by Gian Giacomo Colli.
- Department of Theatre, Randolph College, Lynchburg, Virginia (2010) Directed by Grant Mudge.
- Department of Theatre, Film and Television Studies, Aberystwyth University, Wales (2010) Directed by Richard Cheshire.
- Brown/Trinity Rep MFA Programs, Providence, Rhode Island (2011) Adapted and Directed by Talya Klein.
- Theater Arts at the California Institute of Technology, Pasadena, California (2012) Directed by Brian Brophy, Adapted by Ann Lindsey.
- University of Minnesota/Guthrie Theater BFA Actor Training Program (2012) Adapted/Directed by Joel Sass, performed by the graduating class of 2013.
- Thinking Cap Theatre, Fort Lauderdale. Directed by Nicole Stodard (8 February – 3 March 2013).
- Shotgun Players, Berkeley, California (2015).
- Royal Shakespeare Company, Swan Theatre, Directed by LoveBday Ingram, Stratford-upon-Avon, UK (2016)
- Department of English, McGill University, Montréal, Canada, Directed by Sean Carney (2016)
- Carnegie Mellon University School of Drama, Pittsburgh, Pennsylvania, Directed by David Bond, Adapted by John Barton (2016)
- University of Manitoba/Blackhole Theatre Company, Directed by Magret Groome (2017)
- Ithaca College, Directed by Greg Bostwick (2017)
- Belvoir Street Theatre, Sydney, Australia, Directed by Eamon Flack (2017)
- The Workshop Youth Theatre Group, Halifax, West Yorkshire (2018)
- The Michigan Shakespeare Festival, Jackson & Canton, MI (2018) Adapted and Directed by Janice L Blixt
- Torn Out Theater (Aug 2018) outdoors in NYC's Prospect Park. The "gender-bending production will make selective use of nudity"
- University of Central Florida (2020)
- Mary Baldwin University's Shakespeare and Performance Program (2023)
- Victoria University of Wellington, THEA301 Company, Directed by Nicola Hyland (2024). Set in a 1970s nightclub akin to Studio 54, with "escapist dreams [becoming] tangled nightmares."
- Chapman University, Directed by Erin O'Neill (2024)
