= Travels with Jack Lemmon's Dog =

Travels with Jack Lemmon's Dog is a play by Chambers Stevens. The comedy follows the real life account of two men taking actor Jack Lemmon's black poodle from California to Vancouver, British Columbia, Canada, where the owner of the dog, Jack Lemmon, is working. With workshops in North Hollywood, California, it premiered at the North Star Theatre in New Orleans in October 2001. The original cast includes Dan Burkarth, Ladson Deyne, and Linda DiLeo, with Lori Bennett as director.
