= Shakespeare Club of Stratford-upon-Avon =

- Named after: William Shakespeare
- Formation: 23 April 1824; 202 years ago
- Purpose: Celebrates the life and literary works of William Shakespeare
- Headquarters: Stratford-upon-Avon
- Location: Varies

The Shakespeare Club of Stratford-upon-Avon is a society based in Stratford-upon-Avon, England, that celebrates the life and literary works of William Shakespeare. It is the oldest Shakespeare society in the world, having been in existence since 1824. It now meets monthly between October and May at the Shakespeare Institute, for a series of lectures on a wide range of Shakespeare-related subjects.

== History ==
On 23 April 1824, Mr Thomas Hyde held a dinner at the Falcon Inn to commemorate Shakespeare's Birthday. This event, attended by a dozen or so local gentlemen, is usually taken to mark the foundation of the Shakespeare Club. "The first object of the Club was the annual celebration of the poet's birthday as well as the carrying out of a triennial commemoration on a larger scale" This was not however the first occasion on which Stratfordians had independently come together to honour the memory of Shakespeare. 1816 had marked the bicentenary of his death and "was commemorated by public banquets, a ball and firework display", and other celebrations were held between 1816 and 1823. The 1824 Club though proved so successful that by 1826 the annual dinner had to be held in the Town Hall rather than the Falcon Inn. By 1827, when the first triennial commemoration was held the club's membership numbered 400, a procession of Shakespeare's characters walked around the town before proceeding to New Place to lay the foundation stone of the town's first permanent theatre. In the same year a rival Shakespeare Club, the True Blue Club, was also founded, and for several years the two were in direct competition. In 1830 the original club was honoured as "King George IV...became the patron of the Club. ..henceforward ... to be known as the Royal Shakespearean Club". The Club continued under royal patronage until its refounding in 1874.

In 1835 the Club set up the Shakespearean Monumental Committee to raise money to restore Shakespeare's monument and the graves of his family in Holy Trinity Church. Then in 1837 it was announced that "The object of the members of the Royal Shakespearean Club is not to convene an assembly...merely to enjoy the festive board. They desire to add, if possible, honour to the memory ... to preserve every relic... to render his works more universally read... and to hand down his writings to posterity". The Club extended the range of its involvement "to the preservation of the house in which Shakespeare's father resided, in Henley Street, the presumed Birthplace of Shakespeare; and to Anne Hathaway's Cottage, and even to the purchase of the site of New Place". It was a committee formed by the Shakespeare Club that took on the responsibility of organising the purchase of the Birthplace which eventually led to the creation of the Shakespeare Birthplace Trust.

In the second half of the nineteenth century the Club that had once initiated all Shakespeare-related activity in the town found itself without an over-riding purpose as first the Shakespeare Birthplace Trust, then the Shakespeare Memorial Theatre, were founded in order to preserve the memory of Shakespeare, the buildings associated with him, and the promotion of his works. These organisations also took on the responsibility of organising annual festivities.

The Club reinvented itself in the 1870s, and was formally refounded in 1874, becoming largely a social club offering lectures during the year. Now its main role is as a meeting-place for Shakespeare-lovers in the town at its meetings and at the Shakespeare Birthday Celebrations.

Social events are occasionally held and the Club takes part in the Shakespeare Birthday Celebrations, when a laurel wreath is carried to the church to be hung directly below Shakespeare's Monument in recognition of the Club's historic importance. (The wreath-laying tradition was first instituted in 1895.)

The Club's president changes annually and each year one meeting is the presidential evening. Presidents are usually academics or theatre professionals: in recent years presidents have included Professor Stanley Wells, Emma Rice, Professor Lena Orlin and Dame Harriet Walter. Distinguished past presidents have included John Gielgud, Peggy Ashcroft and Sir Richard Eyre.

In November 2016 a full history of the Club was published, written by two long-serving members of the committee, Susan Brock and Sylvia Morris.

== See also ==
- Shakespeare festival
