= Desperate for Magic =

Play by Chambers Stevens

Desperate for Magic is a one-man multi-character play written and performed by American playwright Chambers Stevens. Written with a grant from The Tennessee Commission and the Ingram Industries Theater Fellowship Ingram Content Group, Desperate for Magic debuted in Nashville in 1989. Billed as a magical mystery tour through Generation X, Stevens performed as seventeen characters all looking for something magical in their lives. Dubbed "a male Lily Tomlin" by Los Angeles Magazine, the play, directed by Betsy Sullenger, went on a national tour. In 1994, it was awarded a Garland (Critic's Pick) by Backstage West. In 2001, Desperate for Magic was published by the Eldridge Publishing Company.
