= Elizabeth Quinlan (sociologist) =

American academic

- Other name: Liz Quinlan
- Awards: Canadian Association of University Teachers (CAUT) Equity Award

Academic background
- Education: University of Saskatchewan, Ontario Institute for Studies in Education, University of Toronto
- Website: https://www.elizabethquinlan.net/

Elizabeth Quinlan is an associate professor of sociology at the University of Saskatchewan and an associate member of its Women's and Gender Studies Program. In 2017 she received a national award for equity and justice from the Canadian Association of University Teachers (CAUT) in recognition of her work supporting fair hiring practices and combating sexual violence.

== Education ==
Elizabeth Quinlan received her B.Sc. in mathematics from the University of Saskatchewan in 1993. She received her M.A. in Curriculum Studies from the Ontario Institute for Studies in Education and University of Toronto in 1997, with a thesis on Women’s Participation in Canadian University Mathematics Programs. She received her Ph.D. in Interdisciplinary Studies from the University of Saskatchewan in 2004. Her dissertation, Gendered Determinants of Job-related Training Participation in Canada, won a UofS Graduate Thesis Award in the Professional and Applied Social Sciences.

== Contributions ==
Quinlan is a founding member of the Coalition Against Sexual Assault at the University of Saskatchewan (CASA-UofS) and serves on the Saskatoon & District Labour Council and the Saskatchewan Federation of Labour Executive Council. She has served on the board of the Saskatoon Sexual Assault and Information Centre (SSAIC) the Women's Reference Group of the Saskatchewan Labour Force Development Board, and the Saskatchewan chapter of the Canadian Research Institute for the Advancement of Women.

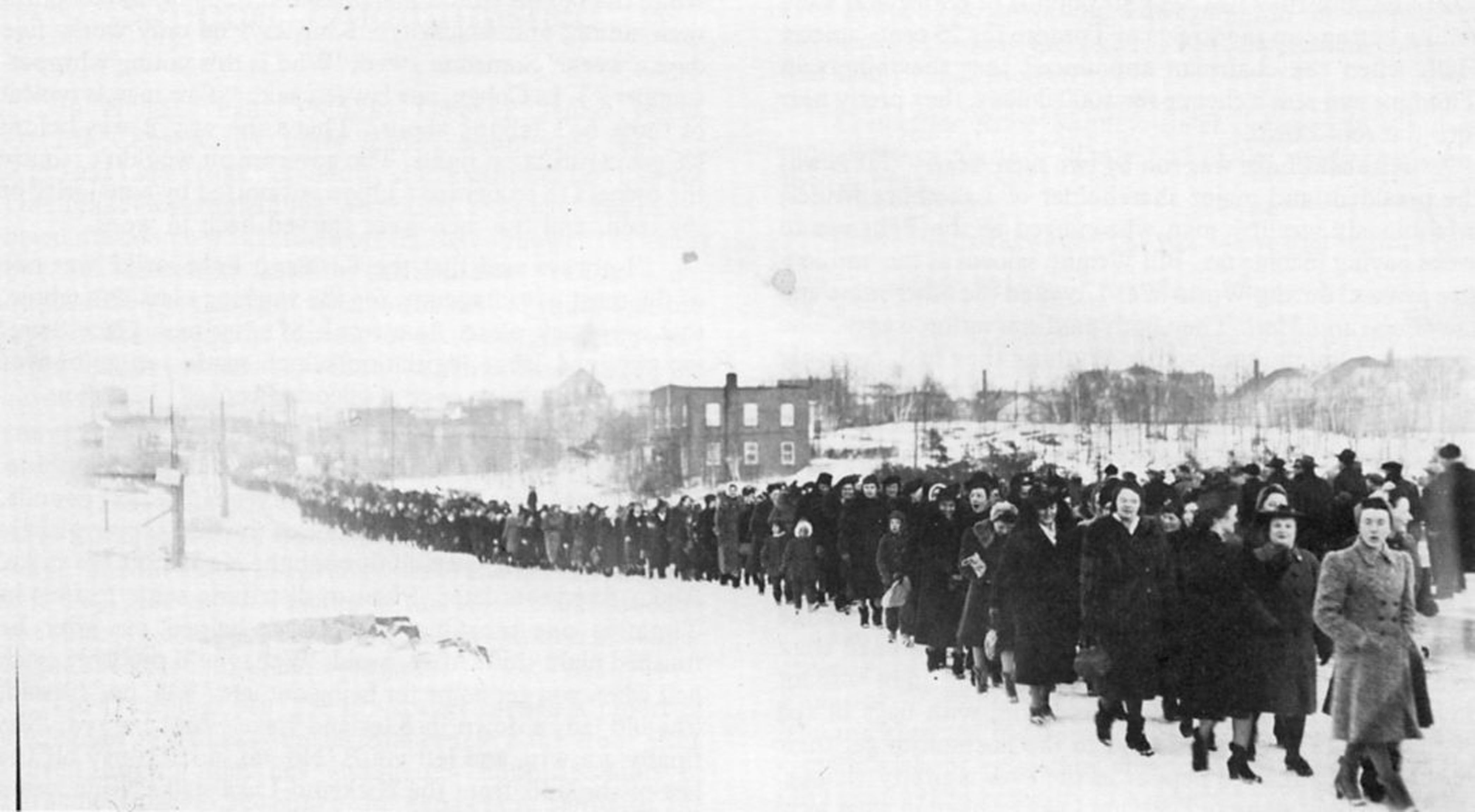
A 2-mile picket line of women and children in the 1941 Kirkland Lake strike

In 2016, Elizabeth Quinlan commissioned playwright Jennifer Wynne Webber to create an original play based on one of Quinlan's areas of research: the role of women in Canada's labour movement. Webber's play, With Glowing Hearts: How Ordinary Women Worked Together to Change the World (and Did) won the Best of the Fest Award at the 2016 Saskatoon Fringe Theatre Festival. Women's auxiliaries of the International Union of Mine, Mill and Smelter Workers (IUMMSW) were active as labour advocates and social organizers in their communities in the 1940s, 50's and 60's. Their role in the Kirkland Lake strike of 1941-1942 was pivotal, and led to Canadian labour legislation that requires employers to recognize and bargain with unions.

Quinlan has used participatory theatre as a tool for exploring and addressing workplace harassment in health care settings. The research focuses on the working conditions of front-line, direct care providers whose labour is indispensable to the health and well-being of ever greater numbers of Canadian families. Some of these care providers are the foot soldiers of end-of-life care, who feed, toilet, walk, dress, and comfort the residents of nursing homes. When workplace harassment is superimposed onto such challenging work, the stress adds to health risks for these care providers, and therefore the recipients of their care. Funding from the Canadian Institutes of Health Research has enabled Quinlan to work with aides, registered nurses (RNs) and licensed practical nurses (LPNs). Quinlan has also co-led a project focused on improving quality of life for cancer survivors through creative practice.

Quinlan co-edited Sexual Violence at Canadian Universities: Activism, Institutional Responses, and Strategies for Change, from Wilfrid Laurier University Press (2017). The collection comprehensively reviews and analyzes sexual assault on Canadian campuses.
