= The Steve Spots =

American television program

The Steve Spots is a thirty-six episode television show that aired on WSMV-TV in Nashville, Tennessee. Created by director David Van Hooser, each episode dealt with the “trials and tribulations” of Steve played by actor Chambers Stevens. The show aired during the 1987-88 television season. Originally conceived as a twelve part series Van Hooser wrote thirty-six episodes. When the show was cancelled an out pouring of community support forced the station to create The Parent Zone. Zone was a TV special with the same characters as The Steve Spots.
