= Shakespeare Festival of Dallas =

American theatre festival

Shakespeare Dallas (formerly known as Shakespeare Festival of Dallas) is Shakespeare festival in Dallas. The festival was started by Robert Glenn in 1972 as a free summer Shakespeare festival. Since 2002 the organization has been led by Executive and Artistic Director Raphael Parry. It is the second oldest company in the county that still provides a portion of its programming free of charge. Summer programs are presented in Dallas, Texas, and Addison, Texas. The education program is offered throughout the entire North Texas region. The majority of performances are at the Samuel-Grand Amphitheatre in Lakewood.
