= Oklahoma Shakespeare in the Park =

Theatre festival in Oklahoma City

Oklahoma Shakespeare in the Park (OSP) was founded in 1985 in Edmond, Oklahoma, USA by current executive director and Artistic Director Kathryn McGill (née Huey) and Jack J. O'Meara. With two different performing venues, the organization produces a range of classic plays. Oklahoma Shakespeare in the Park is a non-profit organization overseen by a board of directors. Jason Foreman serves as board president. Jon Haque serves as Managing Director, and Michelle Swink as PR/Marketing Associate. In 2007, it relocated to downtown Oklahoma City.

== History ==
OSP was founded in 1985 by Kathryn McGill and Jack J. O'Meara as an outdoor summer Shakespeare festival. McGill, a native of Edmond, Oklahoma, met O'Meara—a local television promotions director—on a visit home from her Master of Fine Arts training in New York City. Their shared interest in Shakespeare and the opportunity presented by the small stage in E.C. Hafer Park, which was available for use by community groups, led to the formation of Oklahoma Shakespeare in the Park as an outdoor summer Shakespeare festival. McGill and O'Meara found interested local actors and generated enthusiasm for the project. In July and August 1985, with a $500 grant from the Oklahoma Arts Council and their own money, they staged their first productions: Twelfth Night and A Midsummer Night's Dream. Each play ran for 5 weeks, for a 10-week season, drawing a total attendance of 6,000 people.

Since the project turned out to be so popular, McGill and O'Meara decided to pursue the project further and formally incorporated Oklahoma Shakespeare in the Park in 1986 with O'Meara acting as managing director and McGill as artistic director. Office and storage space was rented at the Edmond Community Center, along with an all purpose room used for a winter season of performances. The winter performances ran for 3 seasons, but since the space was shared with "…dog shows, cotillions, and other rental uses … which necessitated striking the set after almost every performance" they were eventually put on hold until a more suitable space could be found.

The summer productions fared better, expanding from two to three productions in 1988 and briefly switching to a rotating repertory format in 1989. In 1990 budget limitations forced a return to stock performances of four plays in 59 performances, but the company's goal was still to return to a rotating repertory format. They began charging admissions in 1988, but still set an attendance record with 12.000 visitors for three shows.

In 1989 the City of Edmond's parks department created a new performance site for the company and in 1991 funded the construction of permanent toilet facilities. OSP also built its own semi-permanent two-story wooden thrust stage in 1990. By 1991 OSP had grown to the point where its 25-member board could arrange two benefits each year, raising $15-20.000, and the company received fairly large grants from companies like Phillips Petroleum and Target Stores.

In 2001, OSP's stage was destroyed by fire. The company rebuilt on the same location, but in 2005 fire again struck and the company relocated to the University of Central Oklahoma as a temporary home. In December 2006, under the leadership of then-Board President David Holt (politician), OSP announced that it was relocating to downtown Oklahoma City, and the Myriad Botanical Gardens Water Stage and from June 14 through September 1, 2007 it presented its inaugural summer season in downtown Oklahoma City with performances in repertory of A Midsummer Night's Dream, Cyrano de Bergerac, and Macbeth.

Oklahoma Shakespeare in the Park is a non-profit organization overseen by a board of directors.
