= York Shakespeare Project =

The York Shakespeare Project (YSP) was set up in 2001 to perform all of Shakespeare's plays within a twenty-year period in the city of York. The project is a registered charity, with a stated aim of providing "a long-term cultural, educational and community resource for the people of York and beyond by involving the wider York community in the production of the whole cycle of Shakespearean drama."

== Productions ==
In October 2022 the plays in the initial list were brought to a successful conclusion. The plays performed included all those in the First Folio, together with Pericles, Prince of Tyre and The Two Noble Kinsmen. Productions proceeded in approximate chronological order of writing. Productions on the initial list were:

- Richard III, directed by John White, October–November 2002.
- The Taming of the Shrew, directed by Paul Toy, June 2003.
- The Comedy of Errors, directed by Ali Borthwick, December 2003.
- Titus Andronicus, directed by Paul Toy, April 2004.
- Love's Labour's Lost, directed by Chris Rawson, December 2004.
- Romeo & Juliet, directed by Sarah Punshon, July 2005.
  - The Project's first outdoor production.
- The Two Gentlemen of Verona, directed by Ali Borthwick, November–December 2005.
- A Midsummer Night's Dream, directed by Mark France, July 2006.
  - The audition and rehearsal process for this production was filmed for local Public-access television station York@54, who also broadcast the completed production.
- The Life and Death of King John, directed by Jeremy Muldowney, December 2006.
- Henry VI, directed by Mark France, June 2007.
  - A two part adaptation combining Henry VI, Part 1, Henry VI, Part 2 and Henry VI, Part 3 into parts named Henry VI: The Occupation and Henry VI: Civil War and performed in alternation in the York Guildhall.
- As You Like It, directed by Roger Calvert, July 2008.
  - This production was performed in the Gardens of York Minster.
- The Merchant of Venice, directed by Cecily Boys, November 2008.
- Julius Caesar, directed by Mark Smith, June 2009.
- Richard II, directed by Hugh Allison, November 2009.
- Henry IV, directed by Tom Cooper, July–August 2010.
  - The two plays Henry IV, Part 1 and Henry IV, Part 2 performed in alternation in the disused medieval church of St Martin-cum-Gregory, Micklegate.
- Much Ado about Nothing, directed by Paul Taylor-Mills, June–July 2011.
- Troilus and Cressida, directed by Paul Toy, November 2011.
- The Merry Wives of Windsor. directed by Tom Straszewski, May–June 2012.
- Othello, directed by Mark France October 2012.
- Hamlet, directed by John Topping, again in St Martin-cum-Gregory Church, Micklegate, July–August 2013.
- Measure for Measure, directed by Matt Simpson, December 2013.
- Twelfth Night, directed by Mark Smith, April 2014.
- All's Well That Ends Well, directed by Maurice Crichton, November 2014.
- Timon of Athens, directed by Ruby Clarke, May 2015.
- An all-female production of Henry V, directed by Maggie Smales, October 2015.
- Pericles, Prince of Tyre, directed by Sophie Paterson, April 2016.
- King Lear, directed by Ben Prusiner, November–December 2016.
- Henry VIII, performed in King's Manor, directed by Ben Prusiner, March–April 2017.
- The Winter's Tale, directed by Natalie Quatermass, October 2017.
- The Two Noble Kinsmen, directed by Tom Straszewski, May 2018.
- An all-female production of Coriolanus, directed by Madeleine O’Reilly, November–December 2018.
- Cymbeline, performed in Merchant Taylors' Hall, directed by Ben Prusiner, March 2019.
- Antony and Cleopatra, directed by Leo Doulton, October–November 2019.
- Macbeth, directed by Leo Doulton, prepared for March–April 2020 but postponed due to the COVID-19 pandemic Finally staged October 2021.
- The Tempest, directed by Philip Parr, September-October 2022. Performed as a touring production in seven locations in North and East Yorkshire. This production marked the successful completion of the project's initial aim.

== Second series ==
A decision was taken to launch a further series of productions, to include works related to Shakespeare and with a somewhat longer time-table. This series has so far included:

- Lucrece: an adaptation of Shakespeare's long poem The Rape of Lucrece: edited and directed by Elizabeth Elsworth, April 2023
- Richard III, directed by Daniel Roy Connelly, April 2023
- Edward II by Christopher Marlowe, directed by Tom Straszewski, October 2023
- The Taming of the Shrew, directed by Maggie Smales, April 2024
- The Two Gentlemen of Verona, directed by Tempest Wisdom, October 2024
- Henry VI (play). The three Shakespeare plays covering the life of Henry VI, King of England, have been condensed down into a single play, edited and directed by Irwin Appel, April 2025
- The Spanish Tragedy by Thomas Kyd, directed by Paul Toy, October 2025
- Love's Labour's Lost, directed by Anna Gallon, April 2026
- The Comedy of Errors, directed by Katie Lecky and Emily Carhart, October 2026
- Titus Andronicus, to be directed by Connie Peel, April 2027

== Patrons ==
Patrons include Dame Judi Dench, Adrian Noble and the late Sir Antony Sher.
