= Nashville Shakespeare Festival =

Theater festival in Nashville, Tennessee

- Formation: 1988
- Type: Theatre group
- Purpose: Educate and entertain through Shakespearean experiences
- Artistic director: Denice Hicks
- Website: http://www.nashvilleshakes.org

The Nashville Shakespeare Festival is a Shakespeare festival in Nashville, Tennessee.

== History ==
The Nashville Shakespeare Festival (NSF) originated as the political theatre group Theatrevolution. Theatrevolution was started by theatre director Chambers Stevens, community organizer Ty Brown, Brenda Fowinkle, and Donald Capparella (who is still on the board today), as a way to raise awareness of current political issues. After their first production of The Normal Heart by Larry Kramer, which dealt with the AIDS crisis, the company started to work with the State of Tennessee, dramatizing social issues for the judicial system.

Anxious to get back to their theatrical roots, in 1988 Theatrevolution decided to produce a free Shakespeare play in Centennial Park in Nashville. Chambers Stevens, Chuck Guy, Ty Brown and Brenda Fowinkle founded and incorporated the Nashville Shakespeare Festival, whose first production was As You Like It by William Shakespeare and opened in the rain on August 5, 1988. Clara Hieronymus, the critic for The Tennessean, gave the production a rave review after watching the entire show holding an umbrella. That summer, more than 1,000 audience members attended the six performances. Each summer 10,000 to 15,000 audience members now attend. Since 1988, 200,000 people have attended Shakespeare in the Park. These fully staged, professional productions are presented free of charge to the public.

In 1992, The Festival began offering short Shakespeare productions to Nashville public schools. Over 150,000 students have seen these performances. These tours have led to partnerships with the Nashville Institute for the Arts and the Tennessee Performing Arts Center's Humanities Outreach in Tennessee, which assisted the Festival in producing other classics such as The Belle of Amherst, The Little Prince, and Rip Van Winkle to supplement the company's Shakespearean offerings.

In 2006, the Festival performed Macbeth for 23,000 people through Shakespeare in the Park, TPAC's HOT program, and in rural Tennessee with the help of a grant from the National Endowment for the Arts. In the 2006–2007 school year, the Festival reached an additional 3,000 students and community members through arts-in-education workshops and in-residence programs, including a professionally directed student production of Julius Caesar, performed by a diverse group of high school students from across Middle Tennessee.

The Nashville Shakespeare Festival hosted the 2007 Conference of the Shakespeare Theatre Association, which brought over one hundred professional Shakespeare producers from around the world to Nashville.

In 2008, the Bill & Carole Troutt Theater at Belmont University began to house the winter productions; here it offers school matinees and public performances of its annual Winter Shakespeare production. The Festival also offers workshops for businesses and adult groups, including certified CLE workshops for lawyers. With the goal of reading every one of Shakespeare's plays out loud in a public forum, NSF partnered with the Nashville Public Library for the "Shakespeare Allowed!" program. The readings happen on the first Saturday of each month and the complete canon was initially read by November 2011. In January 2012, NSF started at the beginning and read them all again, one play a month, until February 2015. The program is now in its 4th cycle through the canon.

In 2019, after over 30 years in Centennial Park, Summer Shakespeare moved to oneC1TY, a new, multi-use development in Nashville. The Festival planned to return in the summer of 2020 with a production of What You Will (Twelfth Night), directed by Jim Warren, the Founding Artistic Director of the American Shakespeare Center, but this was cancelled due to COVID-19.

Denice Hicks is the current Executive Artistic Director. She has been a staple of the organization for over 30 years.

== Offerings ==
- Summer Shakespeare production
- Winter Shakespeare at the Troutt Theater at Belmont University, with additional performances in Franklin, Murfreesboro, Clarksville, and Tullahoma
- Apprentice company
- Pop-UpRight Shakespeare
- Performances, educational programs and workshops in schools
- Workshops and classes for adults and children
- Statewide production and workshop tours
- Shakespeare Allowed!
- Touring Shakespeare (Romeo and Juliet in 2019–2020)

== Productions ==
=== Shakespeare in the Park ===
- 1988 – As You Like It
- 1989 – Pericles
- 1990 – The Merry Wives of Windsor (also at Shelby Park)
- 1991 – Othello (also at Shelby Park)
- 1992 – Much Ado About Nothing
- 1993 – The Comedy of Errors
- 1994 – A Midsummer Night's Dream
- 1995 – Macbeth
- 1996 – Julius Caesar
- 1997 – The Taming of the Shrew and The Little Prince
- 1998 – Twelfth Night
- 1999 – The Tempest
- 2000 – As You Like It
- 2001 – A Midsummer Night's Dream (also in TPAC's Johnson Theatre)
- 2002 – All's Well That Ends Well
- 2003 – Romeo and Juliet
- 2004 – The Comedy of Errors
- 2005 – The Winter's Tale
- 2006 – Macbeth (also in TPAC's Johnson Theatre)
- 2007 – The Merry Wives of Windsor and The Two Gentlemen of Verona
- 2008 – Coriolanus
- 2009 – The Taming of the Shrew and The Complete Works of William Shakespeare (Abridged)
- 2010 – Love's Labor's Lost
- 2011 – Romeo and Juliet
- 2012 – Much Ado About Nothing
- 2013 – A Midsummer Night's Dream
- 2014 – As You Like It
- 2015 – Henry V
- 2016 – The Comedy of Errors
- 2017 – Antony and Cleopatra and The Winter's Tale
- 2018 – A Midsummer Night's Dream
- 2019 – The Tempest and Pericles

=== Winter Shakespeare at Troutt Theater ===
- 2008 – Hamlet
- 2009 – Richard the Third
- 2010 – The Tempest
- 2011 – Shakespeare's Case (an original work)
- 2012 – Julius Caesar
- 2013 – Macbeth
- 2014 – Othello
- 2015 – Twelfth Night
- 2016 – King Lear
- 2017 – Romeo and Juliet
- 2018 – Hamlet
- 2019 – Julius Caesar
- 2020 – Macbeth
