= Shakespeare on the Saskatchewan =

Annual theatre festival in Saskatoon, Saskatchewan

Coordinates: 52.13145°N 106.6677076°W

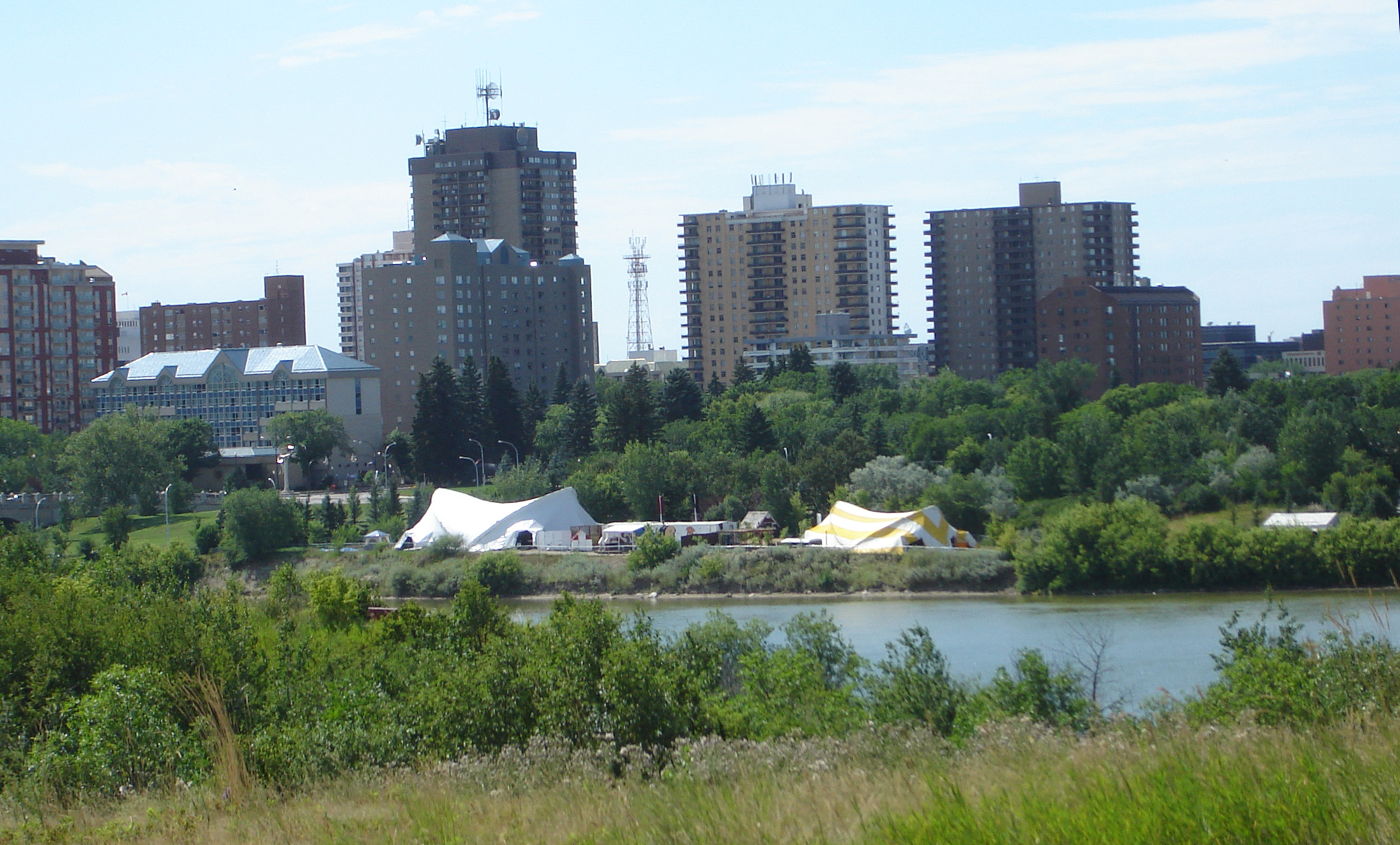
- Shakespeare on the Saskatchewan tents by the Remai Modern museum
- Genre: Shakespeare in the park theatre two full-length Shakespeare plays
- Dates: first week in July until mid August.
- Locations: Saskatoon, Saskatchewan; Canada
- Years active: 1985 – present
- Website: Shakespeare on the Saskatchewan

Shakespeare on the Saskatchewan (Shakespeare on the Saskatchewan Festival) is a yearly summer Shakespeare theatre festival founded in 1985 in Saskatoon, Saskatchewan, Canada. In addition to productions of plays by William Shakespeare and his contemporaries, the festival's activities include medieval feasts, workshops, tours, art displays, special matinees, and a free community stage.

== History ==
The festival was founded in part by Gordon McCall in 1985, launching with a production of A Midsummer Night's Dream staged on a golf course. McCall remained artistic director until 1991, when the role was assumed by Henry Woolf, a British-born actor/playwright/director. Between the years 1991 and 2000, Woolf is credited as director on 16 of the festival’s productions. Among these are several productions of non-Shakespeare plays, including Harold Pinter's Ashes to Ashes.

Woolf retired as artistic director in 2001, and the role was subsequently filled by Mark von Eschen. Having previously been involved in the festival in a number of roles, including associate artistic director, von Eschen remained in his post until 2014. Von Eschen is credited as having directed roughly 24 productions during this period. Will Brooks took up the position of Artistic Producer following von Eschen's departure, and remained in the position until the festival's 2021 season.

On August 1, 2020, construction was completed on a permanent amphitheater for the festival, containing 250 seats and three additional buildings for use as a dressing room, bar, and box office.

== Production history ==
The following production history is sourced from the Shakespeare on the Saskatchewan website.

Year	Play	Director(s)	Theme or Setting
2002	Hamlet	Mark von Eschen	Elizabethan Era
2002	The Alchemist	Mark von Eschen	Traditional
2003	As You Like It	Mark von Eschen	Elizabethan Comic Book
2003	Measure for Measure	Mark von Eschen	1603/2003 crossover
2004	Macbeth	Mark von Eschen	11th Century Scotland
2004	Much Ado About Nothing	Mark von Eschen	1875 Canadian Northwest
2005	The Comedy of Errors	Mark von Eschen	1970s Disco
2005	Romeo and Juliet	Mark von Eschen	Early Renaissance
2006	The Taming of the Shrew	Mark von Eschen	Renaissance Era
2006	The Two Gentlemen of Verona	Mark von Eschen	Pre-World War I
2007	Julius Caesar	Mark von Eschen	Rome, 42 B.C.
2007	Twelfth Night	Mark von Eschen	Age of Rock'n'Roll
2008	The Tempest	Mark von Eschen	Mythical "Age of Dragons"
2008	Henry IV	Mark von Eschen	England, 1492
2009	Antony & Cleopatra	Mark von Eschen	Ancient Rome/Egypt
2009	A Midsummer Night's Dream	Mark von Eschen	WWII Military Base
2010	The Merry Wives of Windsor	Mark von Eschen	1930s Saskatchewan
2010	The Merchant of Venice	Mark von Eschen	1940s Venice
2011	The Winter's Tale	Mark von Eschen	Viking Era
2011	Love's Labour's Lost	Mark von Eschen	Modern-Day University of Saskatchewan Campus
2012	Hamlet	Mark von Eschen	Dream World
2012	As You Like It	Mark von Eschen	Steampunk
2013	The Comedy of Errors	Mark von Eschen	Indiana Jones Inspired
2013	Macbeth	Mark von Eschen	11th Century Scotland
2014	Romeo and Juliet	Will Brooks	
2014	The Taming of the Shrew	Johnna Wright	1960s Doo Wop
2015	Much Ado About Nothing	Pamela Haig Bartley	Post-WWII
2015	Othello	Will Brooks	Modern Business Day World
2016	J. Caesar (Written by Tracey Power)	Anita Smith	Post-apocalyptic 2416 All Female society
2016	A Midsummer Night's Dream	Will Brooks	Circus Themed
2016	The Roving Show	Joshua Beadury	Devised piece based on The Tempest
2017	Richard III	Skye Brandon	Set in the actual time of Richard III
2017	Twelfth Night	Will Brooks	Bluegrass music inspired
2018	Hamlet	Kelli Fox	A futuristic world
2018	The Merry Wives of Windsor	Greg Ochitwa	Set in a present-day holiday resort
2018	Titus A. Puppet revenge	Will Brooks	A bloody Titus with puppets on a second stage
2019	The Comedy of Errors	Joshua Beaudry	Southern Floridian trailer park
2019	As You Like It	Anita Smith	
2019	pimohtewak		Multidisciplinary outdoor piece
2020	Macbeth	Will Brooks	Cancelled due to COVID-19 pandemic
2020	The Tempest	Yvette Nolan	Cancelled due to pandemic
2020	The Tempest - An Online Reading Event		Translated into modern English and performed on Zoom
2020	Fireside Stories		Stories of Ukrainian immigrants and Canadian Indigenous people
2020	Staging the Future		Livestreamed opening night of new amphitheater
2021	Macbeth		
2021	Cosmos	Micah Jane & Peace Akintade-Oluwagbeye	a collaboration between poet Peace Akintade-Oluwagbeye and musician Micah Jane
2021	Macbeth: On Film!		Filmed version of aforementioned 2021 performance
2022	Cymbeline	Jennifer Brewin	
2022	Shakespeare's Will	Roxanne Dicke	A one-woman show depicting Shakespeare's wife Anne Hathaway reading his will
2022	Iago Speaks	Daniel Macdonald	A play depicting events post-Shakespeare's Othello
