= Hudson Classical Theater Company =

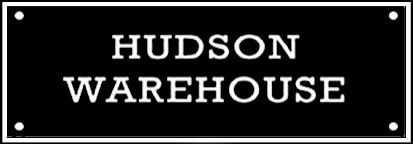

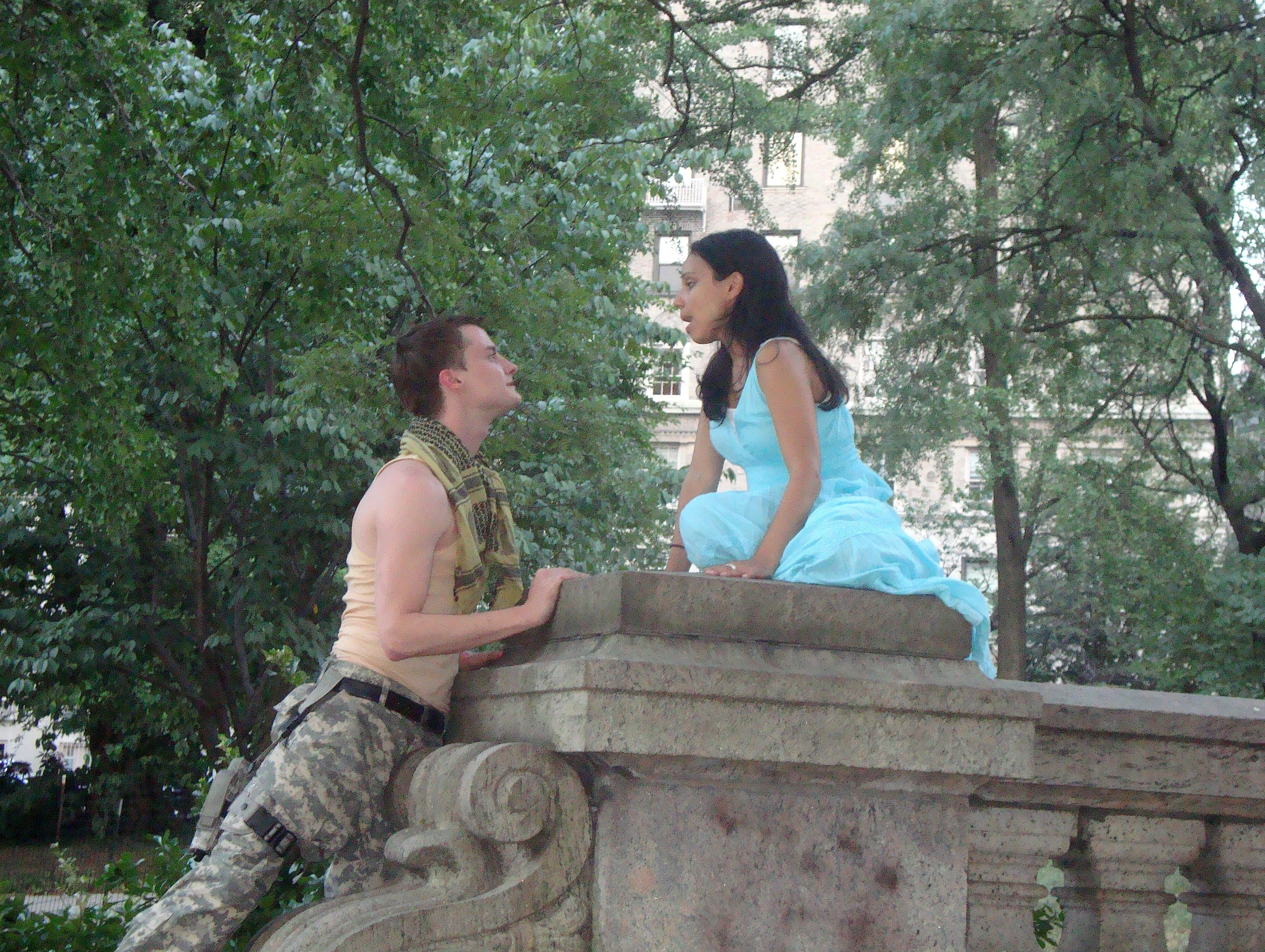
George K. Wells as Romeo and Amanda Ochoa as Juliet, 2010 Season.

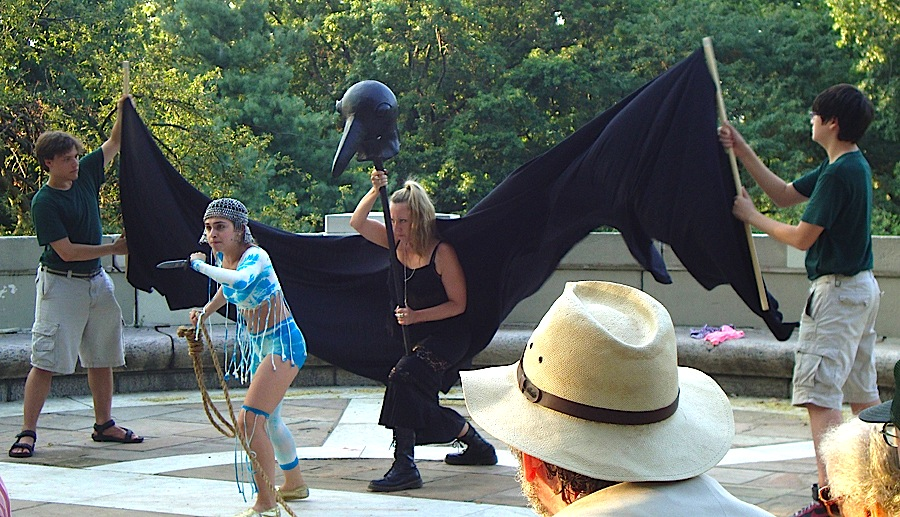
Alex Viola and Amanda Renee Baker in The Seagull, 2011 Season.

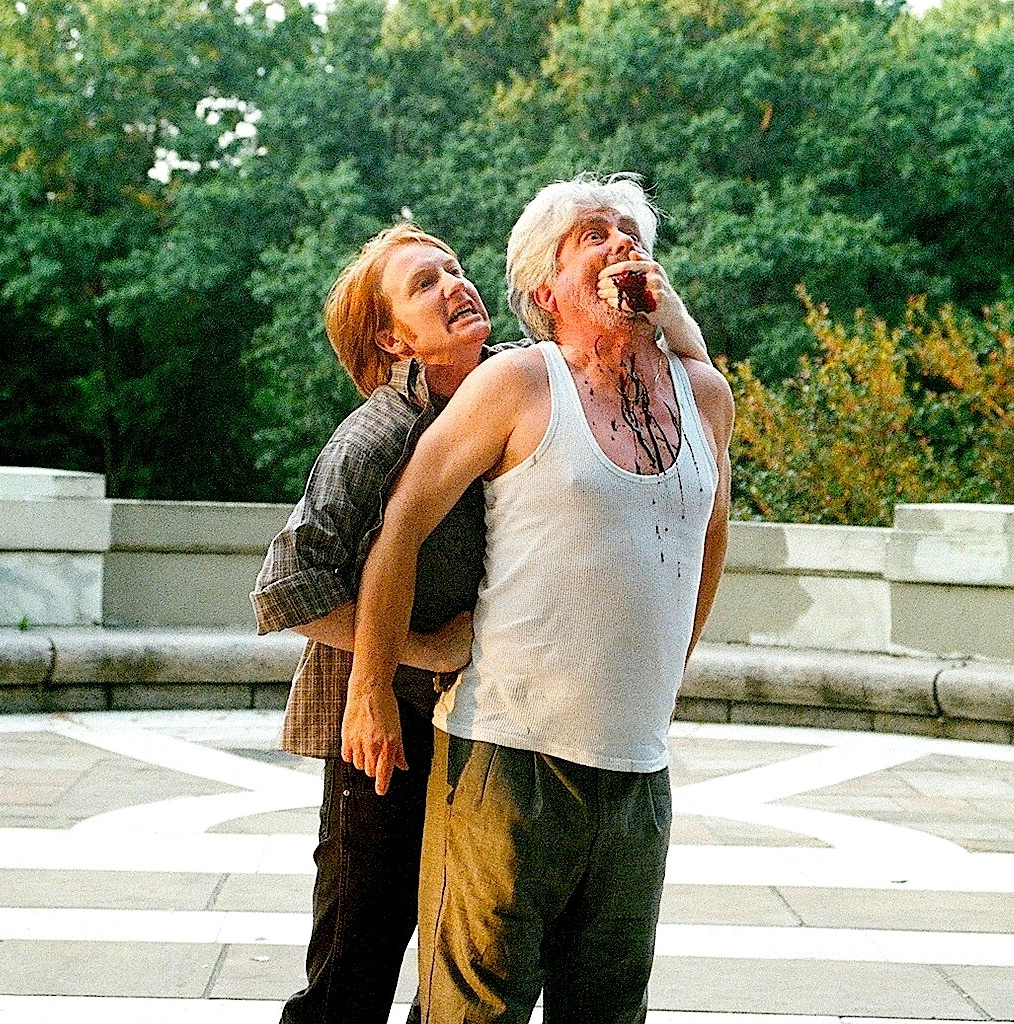
Myles Rowland as James Tyrrel and R. Scott Williams as George, Duke of Clarence, Richard III, 2012 Season.

The Hudson Classical Theater Company, formerly known as Hudson Warehouse is known for presenting outdoor theatre, including Shakespeare. They perform three outdoor plays in the summer months in Riverside Park and fall/winter productions at Goddard Riverside's Bernie Wohl Center. Known as "The Other Shakespeare in the Park," the company was founded in 2004 by Nicholas Martin-Smith, who serves as its artistic director. In 2021 it was renamed as Hudson Classical Theater Company.

Summer performances take place at the Soldiers' and Sailors' Monument in Riverside Park, at West 89th Street and Riverside Drive in New York City, along the Hudson River. Hudson Warehouse is the resident theater company of Goddard Riverside Bernie Wohl Center and their fall/winter season consists of two productions.

Summer productions of 2025 are:

- The Tragedy of Julius Caesar by William Shakespeare, May 1-June 22
- Sense and Sensibility by Jane Austen, May 26-July 20
- The Lady from the Sea by Henik Ibsen, June 23-August 17

== History ==
Hudson Warehouse's first season in 2004 consisted of a single modest production of The Tempest, performed over two weeks that July. The season has since extended to the whole summer, with three productions that each have a month-long run. Past productions include Hamlet, Midsummer Night's Dream, The Taming of the Shrew, Pericles, Prince of Tyre, MacBeth, Romeo and Juliet, Merry Wives of Windsor, Cyrano and Trojan Women, adapted from the tragedy by Euripides. Hudson Warehouse productions in 2012 were The Comedy of Errors, The Rover, and Richard III. The company also holds readings and workshops throughout the year, including its 'Shakespeare in the Bar' series and the 'Writers-a-Go-Go' (WAGG) contemporary play reading series.

In May 2013 Hudson Warehouse was honored as the recipient of Goddard Riverside's 'Good Neighbor Award' "In Recognition of Your Extraordinary Deeds in Helping Build a Better Community." In the autumn of that year Hudson Warehouse became the Resident Theater Company at Goddard Riverside's Bernie Wohl Arts Center at 647 Columbus Avenue on the Upper West Side of Manhattan. In November 2013 they continued their 11th season with a remounting of their June 2013 production of The Complete Works of William Shakespeare (abridged), by Adam Long, Daniel Singer and Jess Winfield, at the Bernie Wohl Center Directed by Susane Lee. The cast included Ian Harkins, Rafe Terrizzi and Nicholas Martin-Smith. This was followed by a production of Julius Caesar in March 2014.

== Shakespeare in the Bar and Writers-a-Go-Go reading series ==
The company's 'Writers A Go-Go' was created by executive director Susane Lee in 2012 to promote the work of contemporary playwrights. It features readings of plays by new and emerging writers in an informal barroom setting. It also co-produces with Goddard Riverside's Community Arts Programs both the Valentines Day Monologue Festival:'The Many Faces of Love,' as well as the annual Veteran's Day commemoration. The series is run by Hudson Warehouse artist in residence Roger Dale Stude.

Since 2010 Hudson Warehouse has also brought its work into the barroom in its Shakespeare in the Bar series, where the acting troupe sit among the bar patrons as if customers themselves as they perform the readings. Regarding the series, John Marshall of the Huffington Post has written, "A natural outgrowth of the Warehouse's critically acclaimed summer productions at the Sailors and Soldiers' Monument, Shakespeare in the Bar seeks to create the same intimate, accessible atmosphere, not just for Shakespeare, but for other classics as well." The 2012/2013 'Shakespeare in the Bar' season included Richard II, Lysistrata by Aristophanes, Othello, The Winter's Tale and Hedda Gabler by Henrik Ibsen. Earlier seasons included productions of The Taming of the Shrew, The Seagull by Anton Chekhov to mark Chekhov's 151st birthday, Henry V, The Merry Wives of Windsor, Richard II, Macbeth, and Tartuffe by Molière.
