= Emotion classification =

Contrast of one emotion from another

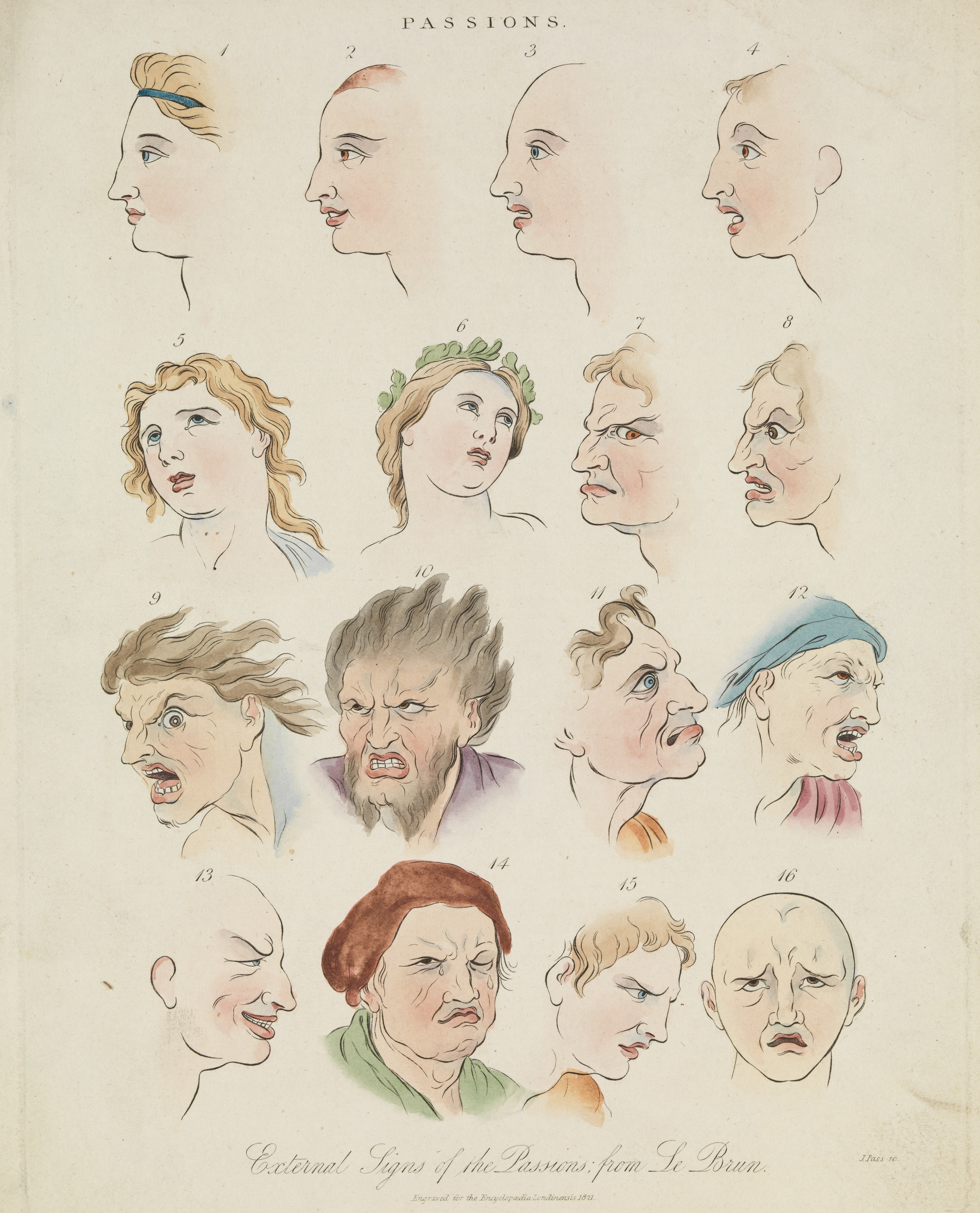
Colored intaglio prints by Charles Le Brun and J. Pass depicting the facial expressions of sixteen emotions

Emotion classification is the means by which one may distinguish or contrast one emotion from another. It is a contested issue in emotion research and in affective science.

== Emotions as discrete categories ==
In discrete emotion theory, all humans are thought to have an innate set of basic emotions that are cross-culturally recognizable. These basic emotions are described as "discrete" because they are believed to be distinguishable by an individual's facial expression and biological processes. Theorists have conducted studies to determine which emotions are basic. A popular example is Paul Ekman and his colleagues' cross-cultural study of 1992, in which they concluded that the six basic emotions are anger, disgust, fear, happiness, sadness, and surprise. Ekman explains that there are particular characteristics attached to each of these emotions, allowing them to be expressed to varying degrees in a non-verbal manner. Each emotion acts as a discrete category rather than an individual emotional state.

=== Simplicity debate ===
Humans' subjective experience is that emotions are clearly recognizable in ourselves and others. This apparent ease of recognition has led to the identification of a number of emotions that are said to be basic, and universal among all people. However, a debate among experts has questioned this understanding of what emotions are. There has been recent discussion of the progression on the different views of emotion over the years.

On "basic emotion" accounts, activation of an emotion, such as anger, sadness, or fear, is "triggered" by the brain's appraisal of a stimulus or event with respect to the perceiver's goals or survival. In particular, the function, expression, and meaning of different emotions are hypothesized to be biologically distinct from one another. A theme common to many basic emotions theories is that there should be functional signatures that distinguish different emotions: we should be able to tell what emotion a person is feeling by looking at their brain activity and/or physiology. Furthermore, knowledge of what the person is seeing or the larger context of the eliciting event should not be necessary to deduce what the person is feeling from observing the biological signatures.

On "constructionist" accounts, the emotion a person feels in response to a stimulus or event is "constructed" from more elemental biological and psychological ingredients. Two hypothesized ingredients are "core affect" (characterized by, e.g., hedonic valence and physiological arousal) and conceptual knowledge (such as the semantic meaning of the emotion labels themselves, e.g., the word "anger"). A theme common to many constructionist theories is that different emotions do not have specific locations in the nervous system or distinct physiological signatures, and that context is central to the emotion a person feels because of the accessibility of different concepts afforded by different contexts.

== Dimensional models of emotion ==
For both theoretical and practical reasons, researchers define emotions according to one or more dimensions. In his 1649 philosophical treatise, The Passions of the Soul, Descartes defines and investigates the six primary passions (Wonder, love, hate, desire, joy, and sadness). In 1897, Wilhelm Max Wundt, the father of modern psychology, proposed that emotions can be described by three dimensions: "pleasurable versus unpleasurable", "arousing or subduing", and "strain or relaxation". In 1954, Harold Schlosberg named three dimensions of emotion: "pleasantness–unpleasantness", "attention–rejection" and "level of activation".

Dimensional models of emotion attempt to conceptualize human emotions by defining where they lie in two or three dimensions. Most dimensional models incorporate valence and arousal or intensity dimensions. Dimensional models of emotion suggest that a common and interconnected neurophysiological system is responsible for all affective states. These models contrast theories of basic emotion, which propose that different emotions arise from separate neural systems. Several dimensional models of emotion have been developed, though there are just a few that remain as the dominant models currently accepted by most. The two-dimensional models that are most prominent are the circumplex model, the vector model, and the Positive Activation – Negative Activation (PANA) model.

=== Circumplex model ===
Circumplex model of emotion has two axes: Valence and Arousal

The circumplex model of emotion was developed by James Russell. This model suggests that emotions are distributed in a two-dimensional circular space, containing arousal and valence dimensions. Arousal represents the vertical axis and valence represents the horizontal axis, while the center of the circle represents a neutral valence and a medium level of arousal. In this model, emotional states can be represented at any level of valence and arousal, or at a neutral level of one or both of these factors. Circumplex models have been used most commonly to test stimuli of emotion words, emotional facial expressions, and affective states.

Russell and Lisa Feldman Barrett describe their modified circumplex model as representative of core affect, or the most elementary feelings that are not necessarily directed toward anything. Different prototypical emotional episodes, or clear emotions that are evoked or directed by specific objects, can be plotted on the circumplex, according to their levels of arousal and pleasure.

=== Vector model ===
The vector model of emotion suggests that emotions are structured in terms of arousal and valence. A positive valence represents appetitive motivation and negative valence represents defensive motivation.

The vector model of emotion appeared in 1992. This two-dimensional model consists of vectors that point in two directions, representing a "boomerang" shape. The model assumes that there is always an underlying arousal dimension, and that valence determines the direction in which a particular emotion lies. For example, a positive valence would shift the emotion up the top vector and a negative valence would shift the emotion down the bottom vector. In this model, high arousal states are differentiated by their valence, whereas low arousal states are more neutral and are represented near the meeting point of the vectors. Vector models have been most widely used in the testing of word and picture stimuli.

=== Positive activation – negative activation (P.A.N.A.) model ===
The positive activation – negative activation (P.A.N.A.) or "consensual" model of emotion, originally created by Watson and Tellegen in 1985, suggests that positive affect and negative affect are two separate systems. Similar to the vector model, states of higher arousal tend to be defined by their valence, and states of lower arousal tend to be more neutral in terms of valence. In the P.A.N.A. model, the vertical axis represents low to high positive affect and the horizontal axis represents low to high negative affect. The dimensions of valence and arousal lay at a 45-degree rotation over these axes.

=== Plutchik's model ===
Robert Plutchik offers a three-dimensional model that is a hybrid of both basic-complex categories and dimensional theories. It arranges emotions in concentric circles where inner circles are more basic and outer circles more complex. Notably, outer circles are also formed by blending the inner circle emotions. Plutchik's model, as Russell's, emanates from a circumplex representation, where emotional words were plotted based on similarity. There are numerous emotions, which appear in several intensities and can be combined in various ways to form emotional "dyads".

=== PAD emotional state model ===
The PAD emotional state model is a psychological model developed by Albert Mehrabian and James A. Russell to describe and measure emotional states. PAD uses three numerical dimensions to represent all emotions. The PAD dimensions are Pleasure, Arousal and Dominance.

- The Pleasure-Displeasure Scale measures how pleasant an emotion may be. For instance, both anger and fear are unpleasant emotions, and score high on the displeasure scale. However, joy is a pleasant emotion.
- The Arousal-Nonarousal Scale measures how energized or soporific one feels. It is not the intensity of the emotion—for grief and depression can be low arousal intense feelings. While both anger and rage are unpleasant emotions, rage has a higher intensity or a higher arousal state. However boredom, which is also an unpleasant state, has a low arousal value.
- The Dominance-Submissiveness Scale represents the controlling and dominant nature of the emotion. For instance, while both fear and anger are unpleasant emotions, anger is a dominant emotion, while fear is a submissive emotion.

== Criticisms ==
=== Cultural considerations ===
Ethnographic and cross-cultural studies of emotions have shown the variety of ways in which emotions differ with cultures. Because of these differences, many cross-cultural psychologists and anthropologists challenge the idea of universal classifications of emotions altogether. Cultural differences have been observed in the way in which emotions are valued, expressed, and regulated. The social norms for emotions, such as the frequency with or circumstances in which they are expressed, also vary drastically. For example, the demonstration of anger is encouraged by Kaluli people, but condemned by Utku Inuit.

The largest piece of evidence that disputes the universality of emotions is language. Differences within languages directly correlate to differences in emotion taxonomy. Languages differ in that they categorize emotions based on different components. Some may categorize by event types, whereas others categorize by action readiness. Furthermore, emotion taxonomies vary due to the differing implications emotions have in different languages. That being said, not all English words have equivalents in all other languages and vice versa, indicating that there are words for emotions present in some languages but not in others. Emotions such as the schadenfreude in German and saudade in Portuguese are commonly expressed in emotions in their respective languages, but lack an English equivalent. That said, "schadenfreude" exists in English corpora as a loan-word and the noun form is used as it would be in German.

Some languages do not differentiate between emotions that are considered to be the basic emotions in English. For instance, certain African languages have one word for both anger and sadness, and others for shame and fear. There is ethnographic evidence that even challenges the universality of the category "emotions" because certain cultures lack a specific word relating to the English word "emotions".

== Lists of emotions ==
Emotions are categorized into various affects, which correspond to the current situation. An affect is the range of feeling experienced. Both positive and negative emotions are needed in our daily lives. Many theories of emotion have been proposed, with contrasting views.

=== Basic emotions ===
- William James in 1890 proposed four basic emotions: fear, grief, love, and rage, based on bodily involvement.
- Paul Ekman identified six basic emotions: anger, disgust, fear, happiness, sadness and surprise. Wallace V. Friesen and Phoebe C. Ellsworth worked with him on the same basic structure. The emotions can be linked to facial expressions. In the 1990s, Ekman proposed an expanded list of basic emotions, including a range of positive and negative emotions that are not all encoded in facial muscles. The newly included emotions are: amusement, contempt, contentment, embarrassment, excitement, guilt, pride in achievement, relief, satisfaction, sensory pleasure, and shame.
- Richard and Bernice Lazarus in 1996 expanded the list to 15 emotions: aesthetic experience, anger, anxiety, compassion, depression, envy, fright, gratitude, guilt, happiness, hope, jealousy, love, pride, relief, sadness, and shame, in the book Passion and Reason.
- Researchers at University of California, Berkeley identified 27 categories of emotion: admiration, adoration, aesthetic appreciation, amusement, anger, anxiety, awe, awkwardness, boredom, calmness, confusion, craving, disgust, empathic pain, entrancement, excitement, fear, horror, interest, joy, nostalgia, relief, romance, sadness, satisfaction, sexual desire and surprise. This was based on 2185 short videos intended to elicit a certain emotion. These were then modeled onto a "map" of emotions.

=== Contrasting basic emotions ===
A 2009 review of theories of emotion identifies and contrasts fundamental emotions according to three key criteria for mental experiences that:

1. have a strongly motivating subjective quality like pleasure or pain;
2. are a response to some event or object that is either real or imagined;
3. motivate particular kinds of behavior.

The combination of these attributes distinguishes emotions from sensations, feelings and moods.

Kind of emotion	Positive emotions	Negative emotions
Related to object properties	Interest, curiosity, enthusiasm	Alarm, panic
Related to object properties	Attraction, desire, admiration	Aversion, disgust, revulsion
Related to object properties	Surprise, amusement	Indifference, habituation, boredom
Future appraisal	Hope, excitement	Fear, anxiety, dread
Event-related	Gratitude, thankfulness	Anger, rage
Event-related	Joy, elation, triumph, jubilation	Sorrow, grief
Event-related	Patience	Frustration, restlessness
Event-related	Contentment	Discontentment, disappointment Depression
Self-appraisal	Humility, modesty, confidence	Pride, arrogance
Social	Charity	Avarice, greed, miserliness, envy, jealousy
Social	Sympathy	Cruelty
Cathected	Love	Hate

=== Emotion dynamics ===
Researchers distinguish several emotion dynamics, most commonly how intense (mean level), variable (fluctuations), inert (temporal dependency), unstable (magnitude of moment-to-moment fluctuations), or differentiated someone's emotions are (the specificity of granularity of emotions), and whether and how an emotion augments or blunts other emotions. Meta-analytic reviews show systematic developmental changes in emotion dynamics throughout childhood and adolescence and substantial inter-personal differences.

=== HUMAINE's proposal for EARL ===
The emotion annotation and representation language (EARL) proposed by the Human-Machine Interaction Network on Emotion (HUMAINE) classifies 49 emotions.

- Negative and forceful
  - Anger
  - Annoyance
  - Contempt
  - Disgust
  - Irritation
- Negative and not in control
  - Anxiety
  - Embarrassment
  - Fear
  - Helplessness
  - Powerlessness
  - Worry
- Negative thoughts
  - Doubt
  - Envy
  - Frustration
  - Guilt
  - Shame
- Negative and passive
  - Boredom
  - Despair
  - Disappointment
  - Hurt
  - Sadness
- Agitation
  - Stress
  - Shock
  - Tension
- Positive and lively
  - Amusement
  - Delight
  - Elation
  - Excitement
  - Happiness
  - Joy
  - Pleasure
- Caring
  - Affection
  - Empathy
  - Friendliness
  - Love
- Positive thoughts
  - Pride
  - Courage
  - Hope
  - Humility
  - Satisfaction
  - Trust
- Quiet positive
  - Calmness
  - Contentment
  - Relaxation
  - Relief
  - Serenity
- Reactive
  - Interest
  - Politeness
  - Surprise

=== Parrott's emotions by groups ===
A tree-structured list of emotions was described in Shaver et al. (1987), and also featured in Parrott (2001).

Primary emotion	Secondary emotion	Tertiary emotion
Love	Affection	Adoration · Fondness · Liking · Attraction · Caring · Tenderness · Compassion · Sentimentality
Love	Lust/Sexual desire	Desire · Passion · Infatuation
Love	Longing	Longing
Joy	Cheerfulness	Amusement · Bliss · Gaiety · Glee · Jolliness · Joviality · Joy · Delight · Enjoyment · Gladness · Happiness · Jubilation · Elation · Satisfaction · Ecstasy · Euphoria
Joy	Zest	Enthusiasm · Zeal · Excitement · Thrill · Exhilaration
Joy	Contentment	Pleasure
Joy	Pride	Triumph
Joy	Optimism	Eagerness · Hope
Joy	Enthrallment	Enthrallment · Rapture
Joy	Relief	Relief
Surprise	Surprise	Amazement · Astonishment
Anger	Irritability	Aggravation · Agitation · Annoyance · Grouchy · Grumpy · Crosspatch
Anger	Exasperation	Frustration
Anger	Rage	Anger · Outrage · Fury · Wrath · Hostility · Ferocity · Bitterness · Hatred · Scorn · Spite · Vengefulness · Dislike · Resentment
Anger	Disgust	Revulsion · Contempt · Loathing
Anger	Envy	Jealousy
Anger	Torment	Torment
Sadness	Suffering	Agony · Anguish · Hurt
Sadness	Sadness	Depression · Despair · Gloom · Glumness · Unhappiness · Grief · Sorrow · Woe · Misery · Melancholy
Sadness	Disappointment	Dismay · Displeasure
Sadness	Shame	Guilt · Regret · Remorse
Sadness	Neglect	Alienation · Defeatism · Dejection · Embarrassment · Homesickness · Humiliation · Insecurity · Insult · Isolation · Loneliness · Rejection
Sadness	Sympathy	Pity · Mono no aware · Sympathy
Fear	Horror	Alarm · Shock · Fear · Fright · Horror · Terror · Panic · Hysteria · Mortification
Fear	Nervousness	Anxiety · Suspense · Uneasiness · Apprehension (fear) · Worry · Distress · Dread

=== Plutchik's wheel of emotions ===
Plutchik's original emotion wheel

A diagram depicting the primary, secondary, and tertiary dyads

In 1980, Robert Plutchik diagrammed a wheel of eight emotions: joy, trust, fear, surprise, sadness, disgust, anger and anticipation, inspired by his Ten Postulates. Plutchik also theorized twenty-four "Primary", "Secondary", and "Tertiary" dyads (feelings composed of two emotions). The wheel emotions can be paired in four groups:

Primary dyad = one petal apart = Love = Joy + Trust
Secondary dyad = two petals apart = Envy = Sadness + Anger
Tertiary dyad = three petals apart = Shame = Fear + Disgust
Opposite emotions = four petals apart = Anticipation ∉ Surprise

There are also triads, emotions formed from 3 primary emotions, though Plutchik never describes in any detail what the triads might be. This leads to a combination of 24 dyads and 32 triads, making 56 emotions at 1 intensity level. Emotions can be mild or intense; for example, distraction is a mild form of surprise, and rage is an intense form of anger. The kinds of relation between each pair of emotions are:

Emotions and opposites
Mild emotion	Mild opposite	Basic emotion	Basic opposite	Intense emotion	Intense opposite
Serenity	Pensiveness, Gloominess	Joy, Cheerfulness	Sadness, Dejection	Ecstasy, Elation	Grief, Sorrow
Acceptance, Tolerance	Boredom, Dislike	Trust	Disgust, Aversion	Admiration, Adoration	Loathing, Revulsion
Apprehension, Dismay	Annoyance, Irritation	Fear, Fright	Anger, Hostility	Terror, Panic	Rage, Fury
Distraction, Uncertainty	Interest, Attentiveness	Surprise	Anticipation, Expectancy	Amazement, Astonishment	Vigilance

Dyads (Combinations)
Human feelings	Emotions	Opposite feelings	Emotions
Optimism, Courage	Anticipation + Joy	Disapproval, Disappointment	Surprise + Sadness
Hope, Fatalism	Anticipation + Trust	Unbelief, Shock	Surprise + Disgust
Anxiety, Dread	Anticipation + Fear	Outrage, Hate	Surprise + Anger
Love, Friendliness	Joy + Trust	Remorse, Misery	Sadness + Disgust
Guilt, Excitement	Joy + Fear	Envy, Sullenness	Sadness + Anger
Delight, Doom	Joy + Surprise	Pessimism	Sadness + Anticipation
Submission, Modesty	Trust + Fear	Contempt, Scorn	Disgust + Anger
Curiosity	Trust + Surprise	Cynicism	Disgust + Anticipation
Sentimentality, Resignation	Trust + Sadness	Morbidness, Derisiveness	Disgust + Joy
Awe, Alarm	Fear + Surprise	Aggressiveness, Vengeance	Anger + Anticipation
Despair	Fear + Sadness	Pride, Victory	Anger + Joy
Shame, Prudishness	Fear + Disgust	Dominance	Anger + Trust

Opposite combinations
Human feelings	Emotions
Bittersweetness	Joy + Sadness
Ambivalence	Trust + Disgust
Frozenness	Fear + Anger
Confusion	Surprise + Anticipation

Similar emotions in the wheel are adjacent to each other. Anger, Anticipation, Joy, and Trust are positive in valence, while Fear, Surprise, Sadness, and Disgust are negative in valence. Anger is classified as a "positive" emotion because it involves "moving toward" a goal, while surprise is negative because it is a violation of someone's territory. The emotion dyads each have half-opposites and exact opposites:

Anticipation, Joy, Surprise, Sadness
+	Sadness	Joy
Anticipation	Pessimism	Optimism
Surprise	Disapproval	Delight

Joy, Trust, Sadness, Disgust
+	Disgust	Trust
Joy	Morbidness	Love
Sadness	Remorse	Sentimentality

Trust, Fear, Disgust, Anger
+	Fear	Anger
Trust	Submission	Dominance
Disgust	Shame	Contempt

Fear, Surprise, Anger, Anticipation
+	Surprise	Anticipation
Anger	Outrage	Aggressiveness
Fear	Awe	Anxiety

Trust, Surprise, Disgust, Anticipation
+	Surprise	Anticipation
Trust	Curiosity	Hope
Disgust	Unbelief	Cynicism

Joy, Fear, Sadness, Anger
+	Fear	Anger
Joy	Guilt	Pride
Sadness	Despair	Envy

=== Six emotion axes ===
MIT researchers published a paper titled "An Affective Model of Interplay Between Emotions and Learning: Reengineering Educational Pedagogy—Building a Learning Companion" that lists six axes of emotions with different opposite emotions, and different emotions coming from ranges.

Emotional flow
Axis	-1.0	-0.5	0	0	+0.5	+1.0
Anxiety – Confidence	Anxiety	Worry	Discomfort	Comfort	Hopeful	Confident
Boredom – Fascination	Ennui	Boredom	Indifference	Interest	Curiosity	Intrigue
Frustration – Euphoria	Frustration	Puzzlement	Confusion	Insight	Enlightenment	Epiphany
Dispirited – Encouraged	Dispirited	Disappointed	Dissatisfied	Satisfied	Thrilled	Enthusiastic
Terror – Enchantment	Terror	Dread	Apprehension	Calm	Anticipatory	Excited
Humiliation – Pride	Humiliated	Embarrassed	Self-conscious	Pleased	Satisfied	Proud

They also made a model labeling phases of learning emotions.

	Negative Affect	Positive Affect
Constructive Learning	Disappointment, Puzzlement, Confusion	Awe, Satisfaction, Curiosity
Un-learning	Frustration, Discard, Misconceptions	Hopefulness, Fresh research

=== The Book of Human Emotions ===
Tiffany Watt Smith listed 154 different worldwide emotions and feelings.

- A
  - Abhiman
  - Acedia
  - Amae
  - Ambiguphobia
  - Anger
  - Anticipation
  - Anxiety
  - Apathy
  - L'appel du vide
  - Awumbuk
- B
  - Bafflement
  - Basorexia
  - Befuddlement
  - Bewilderment
  - Boredom
  - Brabant
  - Broodiness
- C
  - Calm
  - Carefree
  - Cheerfulness
  - Cheesed (off)
  - Claustrophobia
  - Collywobbles, the
  - Comfort
  - Compassion
  - Compersion
  - Confidence
  - Contempt
  - Contentment
  - Courage
  - Curiosity
  - Cyberchondria
- D
  - Delight
  - Dépaysement
  - Desire
  - Despair
  - Depression
  - Disappear, the desire to
  - Disappointment
  - Disgruntlement
  - Disgust
  - Dismay
  - Dolce far niente
  - Dread
- E
  - Ecstasy
  - Embarrassment
  - Empathy
  - Envy
  - Euphoria
  - Exasperation
  - Excitement
- F
  - Fago
  - Fear
  - Feeling good (about yourself)
  - (a) Formal feeling
  - (feeling like a) Fraud
  - Frustration
- G
  - Gezelligheid
  - Gladsomeness
  - Glee
  - Gratitude
  - Greng jai
  - Grief
  - Guilt
- H
  - Han
  - Happiness
  - Hatred
  - Heebie-Jeebies, the
  - Hiraeth
  - Hoard, the urge to
  - Homefulness
  - Homesickness
  - Hopefulness
  - Huff, in a
  - Humble, feeling
  - Humiliation
  - Hunger
  - Hwyl
- I
  - Ijirashi
  - Ikstuarpok
  - Ilinx
  - Impatience
  - Indignation
  - Inhabitiveness
  - Insulted, feeling
  - Irritation
- J
  - Jealousy
  - Joy
- K
  - Kaukokaipuu
- L
  - Liget
  - Litost
  - Loneliness
  - Love
- M
  - Malu
  - Man
  - Matutolypea
  - Mehameha
  - Melancholy
  - Miffed, a bit
  - Mono no aware
  - Morbid curiosity
  - Mudita
- N
  - Nakhes
  - Nginyiwarrarringu
  - Nostalgia
- O
  - Oime
  - Overwhelmed, feeling
- P
  - Panic
  - Paranoia
  - Perversity
  - Peur des espaces
  - Philoprogenitiveness
  - Pique, a fit of
  - Pity
  - Postal, going
  - Pride
  - Pronoia
- R
  - Rage
  - Regret
  - Relief
  - Reluctance
  - Remorse
  - Reproachfulness
  - Resentment
  - Ringxiety
  - Rivalry
  - Road rage
  - Ruinenlust
- S
  - Sadness
  - Satisfaction
  - Saudade
  - Schadenfreude
  - Self-pity
  - Shame
  - Shock
  - Smugness
  - Song
  - Surprise
  - Suspicion
- T
  - Technostress
  - Terror
  - Torschlusspanik
  - Toska
  - Triumph
- U
  - Umpty
  - Uncertainty
- V
  - Vengefulness
  - Vergüenza ajena
  - Viraha
  - Vulnerability
- W
  - Wanderlust
  - Warm glow
  - Wonder
  - Worry
- Z
  - Żal

== Mapping facial expressions ==
Scientists map twenty-one different facial emotions expanded from Paul Ekman's six basic emotions of anger, disgust, fear, happiness, sadness, and surprise:

	Fearful	Angry	Surprised	Disgusted
Happy			Happily Surprised	Happily Disgusted
Sad	Sadly Fearful	Sadly Angry	Sadly Surprised	Sadly Disgusted
Appalled		Fearfully Angry	Fearfully Surprised	Fearfully Disgusted
Awed			Angrily Surprised	Angrily Disgusted
Hatred				Disgustedly Surprised

== See also ==
- Aesthetic emotions
- Affect measures
- Affective neuroscience
- Alexithymia
- Emotion and memory
- Emotional granularity
- List of virtues
- Mood (psychology)
- Moral emotions
- Social emotions
- Unipolar emotions

== Bibliography ==
- Ekman, P. (1972). Universals and cultural differences in facial expression of emotion. In J. Cole (Ed.), Nebraska Symposium on Motivation. Lincoln, Nebraska: University of Nebraska Press: pp. 207–283.
- Ekman, P. (1992). "An argument for basic emotions". Cognition and Emotion. 6 (3): 169–200. doi:10.1080/02699939208411068.
- Ekman, P. (1999). Basic Emotions. In T. Dalgleish and T. Power (Eds.) The Handbook of Cognition and Emotion Pp. 45–60. Sussex, U.K.: John Wiley & Sons, Ltd.
- Fontaine, J.; Scherer, KR; Roesch, EB; Ellsworth, PC (2007). "The world of emotions is not two-dimensional". Psychological Science. 18 (12): 1050–1057. doi:10.1111/j.1467-9280.2007.02024.x. PMID 18031411. S2CID 1779061.
- Koelsch, S.; Jacobs, AM.; Menninghaus, W.; Liebal, K.; Klann-Delius, G.; von Scheve, C.; Gebauer, G. (2015). "The quartet theory of human emotions: An integrative and neurofunctional model". Phys Life Rev. 13: 1–27. Bibcode:2015PhLRv..13....1K. doi:10.1016/j.plrev.2015.03.001. PMID 25891321.
- Prinz, J. (2004). Gut Reactions: A Perceptual Theory of Emotions. Oxford: Oxford University Press. ISBN 9780195309362
- Sugu, Dana; Chaterjee, Amita (2010). "Flashback: Reshuffling Emotions". International Journal on Humanistic Ideology. 3 (1). Archived from the original on 2011-04-30.
- Russell, J.A. (1979). "Affective space is bipolar". Journal of Personality and Social Psychology. 37 (3): 345–356. doi:10.1037/0022-3514.37.3.345. S2CID 17557962.
- Russell, J.A. (1991). "Culture and the categorization of emotions" (PDF). Psychological Bulletin. 110 (3): 426–50. doi:10.1037/0033-2909.110.3.426. PMID 1758918. Archived from the original (PDF) on 2016-03-04.
