= Ryan L. Boyd =

American computational social scientist

Ryan Lee Boyd
- Born: January 24, 1984 (age 42); Lafayette, Indiana, U.S.
- Occupation: Assistant professor of psychology at Vanderbilt University
- Known for: Stylometry; Computational social science Digital humanities Psycholinguistics

Ryan L. Boyd (born January 24, 1984) is an American social psychologist, personality psychologist, and computational social scientist whose work focuses on language-based psychological analysis. He is a faculty member of the College of Connected Computing at Vanderbilt University and a co-developer of the Linguistic Inquiry and Word Count (LIWC) text analysis software, having served as a co-author of LIWC2015 and the lead author of LIWC-22. His research examines psychological aspects of language, including stylometric methods to assess authorship and personality in texts.

== Education and career ==
Boyd earned a B.A. in psychology from Purdue University Fort Wayne in 2010, an M.Sc. in social/health psychology from North Dakota State University in 2012, and a Ph.D. in social/personality psychology from the University of Texas at Austin in 2017 under the supervision of James W. Pennebaker. Boyd has held academic and research positions as a postdoctoral fellow in psychology at the University of Texas at Austin (2017–2019), Assistant Professor of Behavioral Analytics at Lancaster University (2019–2022), computational social scientist at the Behavioral Science Lab and Threat Research Lab at ByteDance/TikTok (2022–2023), and Associate Research Professor and principal research scientist in the Department of Computer Science at Stony Brook University (2023–2024). In 2024 he joined the University of Texas at Dallas as an assistant professor in the Department of Psychology, where he directed the REALM (Research on Experience and Action with Language Models) Computational Social Science Lab. He has also served as affiliated faculty at the Texas Artificial Intelligence Research Institute at UT Dallas and is currently a faculty member of the College of Connected Computing at Vanderbilt University.

== Research ==
=== Psychological stylometry ===
Boyd's work in psychological stylometry applies computational methods to investigate authorship and personality in texts. In a 2015 study, Boyd and Pennebaker analyzed the play Double Falsehood, concluding that William Shakespeare and John Fletcher were the most likely co-authors. He has conducted additional disputed authorship studies by early English playwrights, including those of Aphra Behn, providing psychological evidence for the inclusion and exclusion of disputed canon. In related lines of work, Boyd and Hannah J. Dean conducted a forensic psychological analysis of Edgar Allan Poe through text analysis of the author's works and personal writings to determine whether suicide could be ruled out as a cause of death. The research concluded that Poe exhibited signs of psychological distress but found no consistent evidence of suicide.

=== Political psychology ===
Boyd has examined psychological markers in public language by political leaders, including an analysis of long-term trends in the psychological profile of politicians across several Western nations. The research documented long-term shifts in the language of democratically elected leaders, with public communication becoming increasingly "confident" but declining in analytic thinking over time. Boyd's related work on misinformation and strategic communication has explored the sociological and linguistic signatures of Russian troll accounts during the 2016 U.S. presidential election. In 2022, Boyd and Pennebaker analyzed changes in the language of Vladimir Putin in the lead-up to the Russian invasion of Ukraine, identifying patterns consistent with heightened psychological distancing and aggression. In related work, Boyd has applied language analysis to questions of security and political extremism. An article for the Centre for Research and Evidence on Security Threats (CREST) described work using computational language analysis for psychological profiling and event forecasting in security settings. Boyd's later work proposed a cross-ideological model of online extremism based on verbal behavioral signatures across multiple extremist and non-extremist communities, identifying eleven psychosocial dimensions—termed the "Extremist Eleven"—that distinguish online extremist discourse from general social media discourse, and demonstrating that these traits could predict subsequent membership in incel forums up to ten months in advance.

=== Psychological aspects of language use ===
Boyd's research program more broadly examines how everyday language reflects underlying cognitive, social and emotional processes. In review and theory articles, he and collaborators have argued that computerized language analysis in the social sciences has historically operated under an implicit "words-as-attention" framework, and have proposed that "verbal behavior" be theorized as a subclass of behavior more broadly, integrating natural language processing methods with established behavioral and psychological theory to provide a richer account of how language reflects mental life. With Morteza Dehghani, he co-edited the Handbook of Language Analysis in Psychology (Guilford Press, 2022), a reference volume surveying methods and applications of language analysis across psychological science. In subsequent work extending his verbal behavior framework, Boyd and Markowitz proposed the Machine-Integrated Relational Adaptation (MIRA) model, a theoretical framework distinguishing two roles of artificial intelligence in human social life—relational partner (direct-interaction companion) and relational mediator (shaping human-to-human communication)—and integrating attachment theory, social exchange theory and other psychosocial frameworks to account for how adaptive AI shapes interpersonal experience. Building on this framework, Boyd has argued that generative AI represents an opportunity for psychological science comparable to the dynamic models and simulations used in other model-driven sciences, but with a distinction unique to psychology: whereas other fields use models to simulate the phenomena they study, large language models actively produce real psychological change in real people in everyday settings, allowing researchers to test theories of complex psychosocial processes as they unfold in the real world. Boyd has used large-scale text analysis to study story structure, showing that narratives in novels, films and other media follow common psychological trajectories. In a 2020 study, he and co-authors identified a characteristic "narrative arc" in thousands of texts, providing computational evidence for story structures consistent with Freytag's Pyramid. In studies of emotional processes, his work on how people describe their emotions challenged assumptions about emotional granularity, showing that natural emotion vocabularies in everyday language show links to increased distress and reduced well-being. In related work on relationship conflict, Boyd has used language from online relationship-help forums to identify linguistic markers of emotional pain and coping strategies, reporting that men's posts about breakups often show at least as much emotional distress as women's. A substantial portion of Boyd's later work focuses on mental health as reflected in online language. He has co-authored research showing that patterns of social media discussion can be used to predict demand for campus mental health services, with increases in mental-health-related language on public platforms preceding increases in counseling center consultations. Subsequent collaborative work combined theory-driven "archetype" representations of suicidality—drawn from Joiner's Interpersonal Theory of Suicide—with relative-entropy language modeling to extract explanatory evidence of suicide risk from social media posts. Boyd has also examined self-harm and suicidality within online support communities. In a 2025 study of Reddit forums for people with borderline personality disorder, he and his co-authors used large-scale language analysis to track posts before and after disclosures of self-harm, finding that decreases in socially oriented language and increases in hostile or negative emotion words were associated with elevated risk of imminent self-harm behaviours. The study additionally reported that online "likes" and upvotes can inadvertently reinforce more extreme and negative posts in these communities, with implications for moderation and digital mental health interventions. In related work, Boyd co-authored an analysis of nearly 45 million Reddit comments and hundreds of thousands of news headlines showing how three major upheavals (the COVID-19 pandemic, the 2020 Black Lives Matter protests, and the overturning of Roe v. Wade) jointly shaped shifts in self-focused versus collective language, anger, anxiety and engagement in public discourse.

== Selected publications ==
- Boyd, R. L., & Pennebaker, J. W. (2015). Did Shakespeare Write Double Falsehood? Identifying Individuals by Creating Psychological Signatures With Text Analysis. Psychological Science, 26(5), 570–582. https://doi.org/10.1177/0956797614566658
- Dean, H. J., & Boyd, R. L. (2020). Deep into that darkness peering: A computational analysis of the role of depression in Edgar Allan Poe's life and death. Journal of Affective Disorders, 266, 482–491. https://doi.org/10.1016/j.jad.2020.01.098
- Boyd, R. L., Blackburn, K. G., & Pennebaker, J. W. (2020). The narrative arc: Revealing core narrative structures through text analysis. Science Advances, 6(32). https://doi.org/10.1126/sciadv.aba2196
- Entwistle, C., Horn, A. B., Meier, T., & Boyd, R. L. (2021). Dirty laundry: The nature and substance of seeking relationship help from strangers online. Journal of Social and Personal Relationships, 38(12), 3472–3496. https://doi.org/10.1177/02654075211046635
- Dehghani, M., & Boyd, R. L. (Eds.). (2022). Handbook of Language Analysis in Psychology. Guilford Press.
- Boyd, R. L., & Markowitz, D. M. (2026). Artificial Intelligence and the Psychology of Human Connection. Perspectives on Psychological Science, 21(2), 192–220. https://doi.org/10.1177/17456916251404394
