= List of Shakespearean scenes =

The scene descriptions and line counts below are taken from the open content PlayShakespeare.com edition of Shakespeare's plays.

== All's Well That Ends Well ==
Act	Scene	Location	Appr. # lines	Synopsis
I	1	Roussillon. A room in the Count's palace.	214	
I	2	Paris. The King's palace.	86	
I	3	Roussillon. A room in the Count's palace.	249	
II	1	Paris. The King's palace.	223	
II	2	Roussillon. The Count's palace.	60	
II	3	Paris. The King's palace.	293	
II	4	Another room in the King's palace.	55	
II	5	Another room in the King's palace.	93	
III	1	Florence. The Duke's palace.	27	
III	2	Rossillon. The Count's palace.	128	
III	3	Florence. Before the Duke's palace.	14	
III	4	Roussillon. The Count's palace.	45	
III	5	Without the walls of Florence.	97	
III	6	Camp before Florence.	102	
III	7	Florence. The Widow's house.	54	
IV	1	Without the Florentine camp.	88	
IV	2	Florence. The Widow's house.	86	
IV	3	The Florentine camp.	294	
IV	4	Florence. The Widow's house.	40	
IV	5	Roussillon. The Count's palace.	92	
V	1	Marseilles. A street.	45	
V	2	Roussillon. Before the Count's palace.	46	
V	3	Roussillon. The Count's palace.	366	
Ep.	–	–	6	

== Antony and Cleopatra ==
Act	Scene	Location	Appr. # lines	Synopsis
I	1	Alexandria. A room in Cleopatra's palace.	71	
I	2	Alexandria. Another room in Cleopatra's palace.	198	
I	3	Alexandria. Another room in Cleopatra's palace.	125	
I	4	Rome. Octavius Caesar's house.	93	
I	5	Alexandria. Cleopatra's palace.	91	
II	1	Messina. Pompey's house.	61	
II	2	Rome. The house of Lepidus.	289	
II	3	Rome. Octavius Caesar's house.	47	
II	4	Rome. A street.	14	
II	5	Alexandria. Cleopatra's palace.	146	
II	6	Near Misenum.	156	
II	7	On board Pompey's galley, off Misenum.	151	
III	1	A plain in Syria.	41	
III	2	Rome. An ante-chamber in Octavius Caesar's house.	80	
III	3	Alexandria. Cleopatra's palace.	65	
III	4	Athens. A room in Antony's house.	41	
III	5	Athens. Another room in Antony's house.	25	
III	6	Rome. Octavius Caesar's house.	112	
III	7	Near Actium. Mark Antony's camp.	100	
III	8	A plain near Actium.	6	
III	9	Another part of the plain near Actium.	4	
III	10	Another part of the plain near Actium.	45	
III	11	Alexandria. Cleopatra's palace.	81	
III	12	Egypt. Octavius Caesar's camp.	43	
III	13	Alexandria. Cleopatra's palace.	236	
IV	1	Before Alexandria. Octavius Caesar's camp.	18	
IV	2	Alexandria. Cleopatra's palace.	56	
IV	3	Alexandria. Before Cleopatra's palace.	34	
IV	4	Alexandria. Before Cleopatra's palace.	48	
IV	5	Alexandria. Mark Antony's camp.	25	
IV	6	Alexandria. Octavius Caesar's camp.	43	
IV	7	Field of battle between the camps.	21	
IV	8	Under the walls of Alexandria.	44	
IV	9	Alexandria. Octavius Caesar's camp.	43	
IV	10	The field of battle between the camps.	10	
IV	11	Another part of the field of battle between the camps.	4	
IV	12	Another part of the field of battle between the camps.	53	
IV	13	Alexandria. Cleopatra's palace.	12	
IV	14	Alexandria. Another room in Cleopatra's palace.	170	
IV	15	Alexandria. Another room in a monument in Cleopatra's palace.	105	
V	1	Alexandria. Octavius Caesar's camp.	91	
V	2	Alexandria. Another room in a monument in Cleopatra's palace.	427	

== As You Like It ==
Act	Scene	Location	Appr. # lines	Synopsis
I	1	An orchard of Oliver's house.	145	Orlando complains that he has not been given the money, education, or respect that he is due from being the younger son of his wealthy, deceased father. He complains to Adam, an elderly servant, that Oliver, the eldest son, refuses to follow the instructions in the will to leave Orlando money. Oliver appears and there is a brief scuffle between Orlando and Oliver. After Orlando and Adam exit, Oliver plots to kill Orlando by allowing him to be injured in a wrestling match.
I	2	A lawn before the Duke's palace.	249	
I	3	A room in the Duke's palace.	136	
II	1	The Forest of Arden.	72	
II	2	The Duke's palace.	21	
II	3	Before Oliver's house.	77	Adam praises Orlando for being virtuous, but says that Oliver plans to kill Orlando. Orlando decides to leave home immediately. Adam goes with him.
II	4	The Forest of Arden.	95	
II	5	Another part of the Forest of Arden.	56	
II	6	Another part of the Forest of Arden.	15	Orlando and Adam travel through the forest, exhausted and starving. Adam collapses, insisting he will now die. Orlando leaves Adam, promising to return with food.
II	7	Another part of the Forest of Arden.	205	
III	1	The Duke's palace.	18	
III	2	The Forest of Arden.	378	
III	3	Another part of the Forest of Arden.	86	Touchstone convinces Audrey, a young goat keeper, to marry him. A priest arrives to perform the ceremony immediately, but Jaques intervenes, persuading Touchstone to hold the ceremony in a real church.
III	4	Another part of the Forest of Arden.	54	
III	5	Another part of the Forest of Arden.	143	
IV	1	The Forest of Arden.	188	Jaques describes his personal type of melancholy to Rosalind (still pretending to be Ganymede) and Celia (still pretending to be Aliena). Orlando shows up for the schedules meeting and Jaques exits. "Ganymede" tries to counsel Orlando out of being in love. "Ganymede" pretends to be Rosalind and urges Orlando to woo her. They pretend to get married, with Celia acting as priest.
IV	2	Another part of the Forest of Arden.	19	
IV	3	Another part of the Forest of Arden.	183	
V	1	The Forest of Arden.	56	
V	2	Another part of the Forest of Arden.	114	
V	3	Another part of the Forest of Arden.	37	
V	4	Another part of the Forest of Arden.	188	
Ep.	–	–	19	

== The Comedy of Errors ==
Act	Scene	Location	Appr. # lines	Synopsis
I	1	A hall in Duke Solinus's Palace.	158	
I	2	The mart.	105	
II	1	The house of Antipholus of Ephesus.	116	
II	2	A public place.	214	
III	1	Before the house of Antipholus of Ephesus.	131	
III	2	Before the house of Antipholus of Ephesus.	175	
IV	1	A public place.	113	
IV	2	A room in the house of Antipholus of Ephesus.	70	
IV	3	A public place.	89	
IV	4	A street.	155	
V	1	A street before an abbey.	430	

== Coriolanus ==
Act	Scene	Location	Appr. # lines	Synopsis
I	1	Rome. A street.	292	
I	2	Corioli. The Senate-house.	46	
I	3	Rome. A room in Martius Coriolanus' house.	106	
I	4	Before Corioli.	75	
I	5	Corioli. A street.	32	
I	6	Near Cominius' camp.	104	
I	7	The gates of Corioli.	8	
I	8	A field of battle.	19	
I	9	The Roman camp.	106	
I	10	The Volscian camp.	36	
II	1	Rome. A public place.	274	
II	2	Rome. The capitol.	182	
II	3	Rome. The forum.	271	
III	1	Rome. A street.	417	
III	2	Rome. A room in Martius Coriolanus' house.	172	
III	3	Rome. The forum.	170	
IV	1	Rome. Before a gate of the city.	65	
IV	2	Rome. A street near the gate of the city.	70	
IV	3	A highway between Rome and Antium.	45	
IV	4	Antium. Before Aufidius' house.	30	
IV	5	Antium. A hall in Aufidius' house.	227	
IV	6	Rome. A public place.	194	
IV	7	A camp near Rome.	59	
V	1	Rome. A public place.	86	
V	2	Entrance of the Volscian camp before Rome.	108	
V	3	The tent of Coriolanus.	228	
V	4	Rome. A public place.	64	
V	5	Rome. A street near the city gate.	8	
V	6	Antium. A public place.	181	

== Cymbeline ==
Act	Scene	Location	Appr. # lines	Synopsis
I	1	Britain. The garden of Cymbeline's palace.	218	
I	2	Britain. A public place.	32	
I	3	Britain. A room in Cymbeline's palace.	48	
I	4	Rome. A room in Pilario's house.	149	
I	5	Britain. A room in Cymbeline's palace.	99	
I	6	Britain. Another room in Cymbeline's palace.	240	
II	1	Britain. Before Cymbeline's palace.	60	
II	2	Britain. Imogen's bedchamber in Cymbeline's palace.	53	
II	3	Britain. An antechamber adjoining Imogen's apartment in Cymbeline's palace.	174	
II	4	Rome. Philario's house.	193	
II	5	Rome. Another room in Philario's house.	35	
III	1	Britain. A hall in Cymbeline's palace.	89	
III	2	Britain. A room in Cymbeline's palace.	86	
III	3	Wales. A mountainous country with a cave.	112	
III	4	The country near Milford-Haven.	216	
III	5	Britain. A room in Cymbeline's palace.	180	
III	6	Wales. Before Belarius' cave.	110	
III	7	Rome. A public place.	19	
IV	1	Wales. The forest near Belarius' cave.	22	
IV	2	Before Belarius' cave.	479	
IV	3	Britain. A room in Cymbeline's palace.	52	
IV	4	Wales. The forest near Belarius' cave.	65	
V	1	Britain. The Roman camp.	33	
V	2	Field of battle between the British and Roman camps.	20	
V	3	Another part of the field of battle between the British and Roman camps.	102	
V	4	Britain. A prison.	201	
V	5	Cymbeline's tent.	576	

== Double Falsehood ==
Act	Scene	Location	Appr. # lines	Synopsis
I	1	The province of Andalusia in Spain. A royal palace.	50	
I	2	Prospect of a village at a distance.	222	
I	3	Outside an apartment.	84	
II	1	The prospect of a village.	56	
II	2	An apartment.	48	
II	3	Prospect of a village. Before Don Bernard's house.	206	
II	4	Another prospect of Don Bernard's house.	40	
III	1	The prospect of a village.	48	
III	2	Don Bernard's house.	191	
III	3	Prospect of a village at a distance.	181	
IV	1	A wide plain, with a prospect of mountains in the distance.	267	
IV	2	The prospect of the mountains.	129	
V	1	Another part of the prospect of the mountains.	90	
V	2	An apartment in the lodge.	330	

== Edward III ==
Act	Scene	Location	Appr. # lines	Synopsis
I	1	London. A room of state in the palace.	169	
I	2	Roxborough. Before the castle.	165	
II	1	Roxborough. The gardens of the castle.	463	
II	2	Roxborough. Another part of the castle.	212	
III	1	Flanders. The French camp.	189	
III	2	Picardy. The fields near Cressy.	76	
III	3	Picardy. The fields near Cressy.	228	
III	4	Picardy. The fields near Cressy.	13	
III	5	Picardy. The fields near Cressy.	115	
IV	1	Bretagne. The camp of the English.	43	
IV	2	Picardy. The English camp before Calais.	85	
IV	3	Poitou. Fields near Poitiers. The French camp; tent of the Duke of Normandy.	85	
IV	4	Poitou. Fields near Poitiers. The English camp.	162	
IV	5	Poitou. Fields near Poitiers. The French camp.	128	
IV	6	Poitou. Fields near Poitiers. A part of the field of battle.	17	
IV	7	Poitou. Fields near Poitiers. Another part of the field of battle.	36	
IV	8	Poitou. Fields near Poitiers. Another part of the field of battle.	11	
IV	9	Poitou. Fields near Poitiers. The English camp.	64	
V	1	Picardy. The English camp before Calais.	243	

== Hamlet ==
Act	Scene	Location	Appr. # lines	Synopsis
I	1	Elsinore. A platform before the castle.	191	
I	2	Elsinore. A room of state in the castle.	277	
I	3	Elsinore. A room in Polonius' house.	142	
I	4	Elsinore. A platform before Elsinore castle.	101	
I	5	Elsinore. Another part of the platform before Elsinore castle.	209	
II	1	Elsinore. A room in Polonius' house.	131	
II	2	Elsinore. A room in Elsinore castle.	588	
III	1	Elsinore. A room in Elsinore castle.	197	
III	2	Elsinore. A hall in Elsinore castle.	373	
III	3	Elsinore. A room in Elsinore castle.	101	
III	4	Elsinore. The Queen's room in Elsinore castle.	234	
IV	1	Elsinore. A room in Elsinore castle.	46	
IV	2	Elsinore. Another room in Elsinore castle.	28	
IV	3	Elsinore. Another room in Elsinore castle.	71	
IV	4	Near Elsinore. A plain in Denmark.	68	
IV	5	Elsinore. A room in Elsinore castle.	230	
IV	6	Elsinore. Another room in Elsinore castle.	29	
IV	7	Elsinore. Another room in Elsinore castle.	211	
V	1	Elsinore. A churchyard.	289	
V	2	Elsinore. A hall in Elsinore castle.	417	

== Henry IV, Part 1 ==
Act	Scene	Location	Appr. # lines	Synopsis
I	1	London. The palace.	108	
I	2	London. An apartment of the Prince's.	192	
I	3	London. The palace.	313	
II	1	Rochester. An inn yard.	85	
II	2	A highway near Gadshill.	100	
II	3	Warkworth castle.	118	
II	4	Eastcheap. The Boar's Head Tavern.	493	
III	1	Wales. Glendower's castle.	271	
III	2	London. The palace.	181	
III	3	Eastcheap. The Boar's Head Tavern.	186	
IV	1	The rebel camp near Shrewsbury.	143	
IV	2	A public road near Coventry.	73	
IV	3	The rebel camp near Shrewsbury.	121	
IV	4	York. The Archbishop's palace.	42	
V	1	King Henry IV's camp near Shrewsbury.	140	
V	2	The rebel camp.	102	
V	3	The plain between the camps.	59	
V	4	Another part of the field.	163	
V	5	Another part of the field.	45	

== Henry IV, Part 2 ==
Act	Scene	Location	Appr. # lines	Synopsis
I	Pr.		40	
I	1	Warkworth. Before Northumberland's castle.	226	
I	2	London. A street.	220	
I	3	York. A room in the Archbishop's palace.	113	
II	1	London. A street.	164	
II	2	London. Another street.	151	
II	3	Warkworth. Before Northumberland's castle.	70	
II	4	London. The Boar's Head Tavern in Eastcheap.	341	
III	1	Westminster. A palace room.	111	
III	2	Gloucestershire. Court before Shallow's house.	292	
IV	1	Yorkshire. Within the Forest of Gaultree.	233	
IV	2	Yorkshire. Another part of the Forest of Gaultree.	129	
IV	3	Yorkshire. Another part of the Forest of Gaultree.	118	
IV	4	Jerusalem Chamber in Westminster.	137	
IV	5	Westminster. The Jerusalem Chamber.	244	
V	1	Gloucestershire. Shallow's house.	76	
V	2	Westminster. A palace room.	146	
V	3	Gloucestershire. Shallow's orchard.	128	
V	4	London. A street.	29	
V	5	Westminster. Near the Abbey.	102	
Ep.	–	–	17	

== Henry V ==
Act	Scene	Location	Appr. # lines	Synopsis
I	Pr.		34	
I	1	London. Antechamber in the King's Palace.	102	
I	2	London. Presence Chamber in the King's Palace.	315	
II	Pr.		42	
II	1	London. A street in Eastcheap.	116	
II	2	Southampton. A council-chamber.	191	
II	3	London. Before a tavern in Eastcheap.	53	
II	4	France. An apartment in the King's palace.	151	
III	Pr.		35	
III	1	France. Before Harfleur.	34	
III	2	France. Before Harfleur.	125	
III	3	France. Before the Harfleur Gates.	58	
III	4	Rouen. A room in the French King's palace.	55	
III	5	Rouen. Another room in the French King's palace.	69	
III	6	Picardy. The English camp.	160	
III	7	Agincourt. The French camp.	134	
IV	Pr.		53	
IV	1	Agincourt. The English camp.	292	
IV	2	The French camp.	63	
IV	3	Agincourt. The English camp.	135	
IV	4	The field of battle.	69	
IV	5	Another part of the battlefield.	25	
IV	6	Another part of the battlefield.	39	
IV	7	Another part of the battlefield.	173	
IV	8	Before King Henry's pavilion.	119	
V	Pr.		45	
V	1	France. The English Court of Guard.	80	
V	2	France. The French King's apartment in Troyes.	345	
Ep.	–	–	14	

== Henry VI, Part 1 ==
Act	Scene	Location	Appr. # lines	Synopsis
I	1	Westminster Abbey.	177	
I	2	France. Before Orléans.	151	
I	3	London. Before the Tower.	86	
I	4	France. Before Orléans.	111	
I	5	France. Before Orléans.	39	
I	6	France. Before Orléans.	31	
II	1	France. Before Orléans.	85	
II	2	Orléans. Within the town.	61	
II	3	Auvergne. Court of the Countess's castle.	85	
II	4	London. The temple garden.	135	
II	5	London. A room in the Tower of London.	129	
III	1	London. The Parliament House.	207	
III	2	France. Before Rouen.	138	
III	3	France. The plains near Rouen.	91	
III	4	Paris. A room in the palace.	45	
IV	1	Paris. A hall of state.	195	
IV	2	France. Before Bourdeaux.	56	
IV	3	France. Plains in Gascony.	53	
IV	4	France. Other plains in Gascony.	46	
IV	5	English camp near Bourdeaux.	55	
IV	6	A field of battle.	57	
IV	7	Another part of the battlefield.	96	
V	1	London. A room in the palace.	62	
V	2	France. Plains in Anjou.	21	
V	3	France. Before Angiers.	201	
V	4	Anjou. Camp of the Duke of York.	175	
V	5	London. A room in the palace.	108	

== Henry VI, Part 2 ==
Act	Scene	Location	Appr. # lines	Synopsis
I	1	London. A room of state in the palace.	259	
I	2	London. A room in Gloucester's house.	107	
I	3	London. A room in the palace.	216	
I	4	London. Gloucester's Garden.	79	
II	1	St. Albans.	208	
II	2	London. York's garden.	83	
II	3	A hall of justice.	98	
II	4	London. A street.	111	
III	1	The Abbey at Bury St. Edmund's.	383	
III	2	Bury St. Edmund's. A palace room of state.	416	
III	3	London. The Cardinal's bedchamber.	33	
IV	1	Coast of Kent. Seashore near Dover.	150	
IV	2	Blackheath.	167	
IV	3	Another part of Blackheath.	17	
IV	4	London. A room in the palace.	59	
IV	5	London. The Tower.	12	
IV	6	London. Cannon Street.	13	
IV	7	London. Smithfield.	120	
IV	8	Southwark.	64	
IV	9	Kenilworth Castle.	49	
IV	10	Kent. Iden's Garden.	80	
V	1	Fields Between Dartford and Blackheath.	217	
V	2	Battlefield at Saint Albans.	91	
V	3	Field nearby Saint Albans.	34	

== Henry VI, Part 3 ==
Act	Scene	Location	Appr. # lines	Synopsis
I	1	London. The Parliament House.	277	
I	2	Yorkshire. A room in Sandal Castle.	75	
I	3	Field of battle between Sandal Castle and Wakefield.	53	
I	4	Another part of the field of battle between Sandal Castle and Wakefield.	180	
II	1	Hertfordshire. A plain near Mortimer's Cross.	209	
II	2	Before York.	177	
II	3	Yorkshire. A battlefield between Towton and Saxton.	56	
II	4	Yorkshire. Another part of the battlefield between Towton and Saxton.	13	
II	5	Yorkshire. Another part of the battlefield between Towton and Saxton.	139	
II	6	Yorkshire. Another part of the battlefield between Towton and Saxton.	111	
III	1	A forest in the North of England.	101	
III	2	London. A palace room.	196	
III	3	France. A room in King Lewis XI's palace.	270	
IV	1	London. A palace room.	149	
IV	2	A plain in Warwickshire.	29	
IV	3	Edward's camp near Warwick.	65	
IV	4	London. A palace room.	35	
IV	5	Yorkshire. A park near Middleham Castle.	30	
IV	6	London. The Tower.	103	
IV	7	Before York.	86	
IV	8	London. A palace room.	65	
V	1	Coventry.	113	
V	2	A battlefield near Barnet.	50	
V	3	Another part of the battlefield near Barnet.	24	
V	4	Plains near Tewksbury.	82	
V	5	Another part of the battlefield near Barnet.	90	
V	6	London. The Tower.	93	
V	7	London. A room in the palace.	46	

== Henry VIII ==
Act	Scene	Location	Appr. # lines	Synopsis
I	Pr.		32	
I	1	London. An ante-chamber in the palace.	268	
I	2	London. The council chamber.	244	
I	3	London. An ante-chamber in the palace.	83	
I	4	A hall in York Place.	138	
II	1	Westminster. A street.	195	
II	2	London. An ante-chamber in the palace.	158	
II	3	London. An ante-chamber in the Queen's apartment.	128	
II	4	A hall in Black-Friars.	258	
III	1	London. Queen Katherine's apartment.	199	
III	2	London. Antechamber to King Henry VIII's apartment.	533	
IV	1	Westminster. A street.	141	
IV	2	Kimbolton.	194	
V	1	London. A gallery in the palace.	209	
V	2	The lobby before the council chamber.	250	
V	3	The council chamber.	87	
V	4	The palace-yard.	80	
Ep.	–	–	14	

== King John ==
Act	Scene	Location	Appr. # lines	Synopsis
I	1	A room in King John's palace.	278	
II	1	France. Before the town of Angiers.	609	
III	1	The French King's tent.	357	
III	2	The plains near Angiers.	11	
III	3	The plains near Angiers.	82	
III	4	The plains near Angiers. King Philip's tent.	185	
IV	1	Northampton. A room in the castle.	145	
IV	2	A room in King John's castle.	276	
IV	3	Before King John's castle.	167	
V	1	King John's Palace.	81	
V	2	The French camp at St. Edmundsbury.	183	
V	3	The battlefield.	17	
V	4	Another part of the battlefield.	62	
V	5	The French camp.	23	
V	6	An open place in the neighborhood of Swinstead Abbey.	48	
V	7	The orchard at Swinstead Abbey.	122	

== Julius Caesar ==
Act	Scene	Location	Appr. # lines	Synopsis
I	1	Rome. A street.	74	
I	2	Rome. A public place.	323	
I	3	Rome. A street.	170	
II	1	Rome. Brutus's orchard.	351	
II	2	Rome. Caesar's house.	137	
II	3	Rome. A street near the capitol.	13	
II	4	Rome. A street before the house of Brutus.	50	
III	1	Rome. Before the capitol; the Senate sitting above.	316	
III	2	The Forum.	277	
III	3	Rome. A street.	35	
IV	1	A house in Rome.	54	
IV	2	A camp near Sardis. Before Brutus's tent.	57	
IV	3	Inside Brutus's tent.	347	
V	1	The plains of Philippi.	136	
V	2	The plains of Philippi. The battlefield.	6	
V	3	The plains of Philippi. Another part of the battlefield.	118	
V	4	The plains of Philippi. Another part of the battlefield.	33	
V	5	The plains of Philippi. Another part of the battlefield.	87	

== King Lear ==
Act	Scene	Location	Appr. # lines	Synopsis
I	1	King Lear's palace.	325	
I	2	The Earl of Gloucester's castle.	169	
I	3	The Duke of Albany's palace.	27	
I	4	A hall in the Duke of Albany's palace.	335	
I	5	Court before the palace.	45	
II	1	The Earl of Gloucester's castle.	141	
II	2	Before Gloucester's castle.	174	
II	3	A wood.	21	
II	4	Before Gloucester's castle.	341	
III	1	A heath.	58	
III	2	Another part of the heath.	97	
III	3	Gloucester's castle.	22	
III	4	The heath. Before a hovel.	177	
III	5	Gloucester's castle.	22	
III	6	A chamber in a farmhouse adjoining the castle.	114	
III	7	Gloucester's castle.	119	
IV	1	A heath.	89	
IV	2	Before the Duke of Albany's palace.	111	
IV	3	The French camp near Dover.	61	
IV	4	The French camp near Dover. A tent.	32	
IV	5	Gloucester's Castle.	45	
IV	6	Fields near Dover.	304	
IV	7	The French camp near Dover. A tent.	108	
V	1	The British camp near Dover.	78	
V	2	The battlefield between the two camps.	13	
V	3	The British camp near Dover.	385	

== Love's Labour's Lost ==
Act	Scene	Location	Appr. # lines	Synopsis
I	1	The King of Navarre's park.	293	
I	2	The King of Navarre's park.	160	
II	1	The King of Navarre's park.	268	
III	1	The King of Navarre's park.	174	
IV	1	The King of Navarre's park.	149	
IV	2	The King of Navarre's park.	159	
IV	3	The King of Navarre's park.	395	
V	1	The King of Navarre's park.	130	
V	2	The King of Navarre's park.	947	

== Macbeth ==
Act	Scene	Location	Appr. # lines	Synopsis
I	1	A desert place.	13	
I	2	A camp near Forres.	76	
I	3	A heath near Forres.	169	
I	4	Forres. A room in the palace.	65	
I	5	Inverness. Macbeth's castle.	80	
I	6	Before Macbeth's castle.	37	
I	7	A room in Macbeth's castle.	92	
II	1	The court of Macbeth's castle.	72	
II	2	The court of Macbeth's castle.	87	
II	3	The court of Macbeth's castle.	167	
II	4	Outside Macbeth's castle.	52	
III	1	Forres. The palace.	156	
III	2	Forres. The palace.	61	
III	3	Forres. A park near the palace.	32	
III	4	A room of state in the palace.	168	
III	5	A heath.	37	
III	6	Forres. The palace.	53	
IV	1	A cavern.	172	
IV	2	Fife. Macduff's castle.	91	
IV	3	England. Before the King's palace.	278	
V	1	Dunsinane. An anteroom in the castle.	69	
V	2	The country near Dunsinane.	37	
V	3	Dunsinane. A room in the castle.	71	
V	4	Country near Birnam wood.	27	
V	5	Dunsinane. Within the castle.	58	
V	6	Dunsinane. Before the castle.	11	
V	7	A part of the field.	35	
V	8	Another part of the field.	39	
V	9	Dunsinane. Within Macbeth's castle.	47	

== Measure for Measure ==
Act	Scene	Location	Appr. # lines	Synopsis
I	1	Vienna. An apartment in the Duke's palace.	89	
I	2	Vienna. A street.	175	
I	3	Vienna. A monastery.	57	
I	4	Vienna. A nunnery.	99	
II	1	A hall in Angelo's house.	259	
II	2	Another room in Angelo's house.	218	
II	3	A room in a prison.	47	
II	4	A room in Angelo's house.	199	
III	1	A room in the prison.	268	
III	2	The street before the prison.	249	
IV	1	The moated grange at St. Luke's.	79	
IV	2	A room in the prison.	202	
IV	3	Another room in the prison.	172	
IV	4	A room in Angelo's house.	32	
IV	5	Fields without the town.	14	
IV	6	A street near the city gate.	17	
V	1	At the city gate.	578	

== The Merchant of Venice ==
Act	Scene	Location	Appr. # lines	Synopsis
I	1	Venice. A street.	188	Bassanio, a young Venetian of noble rank, wishes to woo the beautiful and wealthy heiress Portia of Belmont. Having squandered his estate, he needs money to properly present himself as a suitor. Bassanio approaches his friend Antonio, a wealthy merchant of Venice, for a loan. Although Bassanio is already in debt to Antonio, Antonio agrees to loan the money to Bassanio. However, Antonio is cash poor – all of his money is invested in shipping enterprises – so Antonio gives Bassanio permission to borrow money on Antonio's credit.
I	2	Belmont. A room in Portia's house.	114	In Belmont, Portia is awash with suitors. Her father left a will stipulating each of her suitors must choose correctly from one of three caskets – one each of gold, silver and lead. If he picks the right casket, he gets Portia. Portia and her servant Nerissa discuss the various suitors, but Portia is not happy with any of them.
I	3	Venice. A public place.	184	
II	1	Belmont. A room in Portia's house.	49	The Prince of Morocco arrives to try to win Portia's hand.
II	2	Venice. A street.	188	
II	3	Venice. A room in Shylock's house.	20	
II	4	Venice. A street.	42	
II	5	Venice. Before Shylock's house.	56	
II	6	Venice. Before Shylock's house.	70	
II	7	Belmont. A room in Portia's house.	80	The Prince of Morocco chooses the gold casket. The casket contains a skull with a note of warning about being fooled by appearances. The prince leaves disappointed.
II	8	Venice. A street.	55	
II	9	Belmont. A room in Portia's house.	103	
III	1	Venice. A street.	106	
III	2	Belmont. A room in Portia's house.	334	
III	3	Venice. A street.	39	
III	4	Belmont. A room in Portia's house.	87	
III	5	Belmont. A garden at Portia's house.	82	
IV	1	Venice. A court of justice.	471	
IV	2	Venice. A street.	21	
V	1	Belmont. Outside Portia's house.	325	

== The Merry Wives of Windsor ==
Act	Scene	Location	Appr. # lines	Synopsis
I	1	Windsor. A street in front of Page's house.	266	
I	2	Windsor. A street in front of Page's house.	11	
I	3	A room in the Garter Inn.	88	
I	4	A room in Dr. Caius's house.	140	
II	1	Windsor. A street in front of Page's house.	196	
II	2	A room in the Garter Inn.	265	
II	3	A field near Windsor.	82	
III	1	A field near Frogmore.	101	
III	2	Windsor. A street.	74	
III	3	A room in Ford's house.	193	
III	4	A room in Page's house.	104	
III	5	A room in the Garter Inn.	128	
IV	1	Windsor. A street.	70	
IV	2	A room in Ford's house.	186	
IV	3	A room in the Garter Inn.	11	
IV	4	A room in Ford's house.	91	
IV	5	A room in the Garter Inn.	104	
IV	6	Another room in the Garter Inn.	55	
V	1	A room in the Garter Inn.	26	
V	2	Windsor Park.	11	
V	3	A street leading to the Windsor Park.	22	
V	4	Windsor Park.	3	
V	5	Another part of Windsor Park.	221	

== A Midsummer Night's Dream ==
Act	Scene	Location	Appr. # lines	Synopsis
I	1	Athens. A room in the palace of Theseus.	255	
I	2	Athens. A room in Quince's house.	91	
II	1	In the woods near Athens.	273	
II	2	Another part of the woods near Athens.	156	
III	1	In the woods.	181	
III	2	Another part of the woods.	482	
IV	1	Another part of the woods.	200	
IV	2	Athens. A room in Quince's house.	36	
V	1	Athens. A room in the palace of Theseus.	423	

== Much Ado About Nothing ==
Act	Scene	Location	Appr. # lines	Synopsis
I	1	Messina. Before Leonato's house.	267	
I	2	A room in Leonato's house.	23	
I	3	A hall in Leonato's house.	58	
II	1	A hall in Leonato's house.	326	
II	2	Another room in Leonato's house.	46	
II	3	Leonato's orchard.	230	
III	1	Leonato's garden.	119	
III	2	A room in Leonato's house.	108	
III	3	Messina. A street.	153	
III	4	Hero's apartment.	80	
III	5	Another room in Leonato's house.	56	
IV	1	Messina. Inside a church.	333	
IV	2	Messina. A prison.	75	
V	1	Before Leonato's house.	319	
V	2	Leonato's garden.	83	
V	3	Messina. Inside a church.	33	
V	4	A room in Leonato's house.	128	

== Othello ==
Act	Scene	Location	Appr. # lines	Synopsis
I	1	Venice. A street.	194	
I	2	Venice. Another street.	116	
I	3	Venice. A council chamber.	419	
II	1	A sea port in Cyprus.	313	
II	2	Cyprus. A street.	10	
II	3	Cyprus. A castle hall.	379	
III	1	Cyprus. Before the castle.	59	
III	2	Cyprus. A room in the castle.	7	
III	3	Cyprus. The garden of the castle.	531	
III	4	Cyprus. Before the castle.	221	
IV	1	Cyprus. Before the castle.	305	
IV	2	Cyprus. A room in the castle.	262	
IV	3	Cyprus. Another room in the castle.	111	
V	1	Cyprus. A street.	143	
V	2	A bedchamber in the castle.	426	

== Pericles, Prince of Tyre ==
Act	Scene	Location	Appr. # lines	Synopsis
I	Pr.		42	
I	1	Antioch (Syria). A room in the palace.	174	
I	2	Tyre. A room in the palace.	129	
I	3	Tyre. An antechamber in the palace.	39	
I	4	Tarsus. A room in the Governor's house.	109	
II	Pr.		40	
II	1	Pentapolis. An open place by the seaside.	151	
II	2	Pentapolis. A public way, or platform leading to the lists. A pavilion by the side of it for the reception of the King, Princess, Lords, etc.	60	
II	3	Pentapolis. A hall of state and a banquet.	123	
II	4	Tyre. A room in the Governor's house.	59	
II	5	Pentapolis. A room in the palace.	98	
III	Pr.		60	
III	1	On a ship at sea.	85	
III	2	Ephesus. A room in Cerimon's house.	127	
III	3	Tarsus. A room in Cleon's house.	48	
III	4	Ephesus. A room in Cerimon's house.	18	
IV	Pr.		52	
IV	1	Tarsus. An open place near the seashore.	111	
IV	2	Mytilene. A room in a brothel.	130	
IV	3	Tarsus. A room in Cleon's house.	57	
IV	4	Tarsus. Before the tomb of Marina.	51	
IV	5	Mytilene. A street before the brothel.	9	
IV	6	Mytilene. A room in a brothel.	182	
V	Pr.		24	
V	1	On board Pericles's ship, off Mytilene.	297	
V	2	Ephesus. Before the temple of Diana.	20	
V	3	The temple of Diana at Ephesus.	98	
Ep.	–	–	18	

== King Richard II ==
Act	Scene	Location	Appr. # lines	Synopsis
I	1	London. King Richard's palace.	207	
I	2	The Duke of Lancaster's palace.	74	
I	3	The lists at Coventry.	310	
I	4	The court.	65	
II	1	Ely House.	303	
II	2	Windsor Castle.	152	
II	3	Wilds in Gloucestershire.	172	
II	4	A camp in Wales.	24	
III	1	Bristol. Before the castle.	44	
III	2	The coast of Wales. A castle in view.	220	
III	3	Wales. Before Flint Castle.	214	
III	4	Langley. The Duke of York's garden.	111	
IV	1	Westminster Hall.	340	
V	1	London. A street leading to the Tower.	102	
V	2	The Duke of York's palace.	127	
V	3	A royal palace.	151	
V	4	A royal palace.	12	
V	5	The dungeon of Pomfret Castle.	120	
V	6	Windsor Castle.	52	

== Richard III ==
Act	Scene	Location	Appr. # lines	Synopsis
I	1	London. A street.	165	
I	2	London. Another street.	275	
I	3	London. The palace.	359	
I	4	London. The Tower.	272	
II	1	London. The palace.	142	
II	2	London. The palace.	155	
II	3	London. A street.	49	
II	4	London. The palace.	78	
III	1	London. A street.	201	
III	2	Before Lord Hastings' house.	124	
III	3	Pomfret Castle.	26	
III	4	The Tower of London.	107	
III	5	The Tower-walls.	109	
III	6	London. A street.	14	
III	7	Baynard's castle.	248	
IV	1	Outside the Tower.	105	
IV	2	London. The palace.	128	
IV	3	London. The palace.	60	
IV	4	London. Before the palace.	557	
IV	5	Lord Stanley's house.	21	
V	1	Salisbury. An open place.	29	
V	2	The camp near Tamworth.	24	
V	3	Bosworth Field.	361	
V	4	Another part of Bosworth Field.	13	
V	5	Another part of Bosworth Field.	41	

== Romeo and Juliet ==
Act	Scene	Location	Appr. # lines	Synopsis
I	Pr.		14	
I	1	Verona. A public place.	238	
I	2	Verona. A street.	102	
I	3	Verona. A room in Capulet's house.	109	
I	4	Verona. A street.	120	
I	5	Verona. A hall in Capulet's house.	153	
II	Pr.		14	
II	1	A lane by the wall of Capulet's orchard.	45	
II	2	Capulet's orchard.	202	
II	3	Friar Lawrence's cell.	97	
II	4	Verona. A street.	194	
II	5	Capulet's orchard.	78	
II	6	Friar Lawrence's cell.	37	
III	1	Verona. A street.	198	
III	2	Capulet's orchard.	147	
III	3	Friar Lawrence's cell.	179	
III	4	A room in Capulet's house.	36	
III	5	Capulet's orchard and Juliet's chamber.	252	
IV	1	Friar Lawrence's cell.	127	
IV	2	A hall in Capulet's house.	49	
IV	3	Juliet's chamber.	59	
IV	4	A hall in Capulet's house.	32	
IV	5	Juliet's chamber.	140	
V	1	Mantua. A street.	89	
V	2	Friar Lawrence's cell.	30	
V	3	A churchyard; before a tomb belonging to the Capulets.	320	

== The Taming of the Shrew ==
Act	Scene	Location	Appr. # lines	Synopsis
I	Pr.	Before an alehouse on a heath.	135	
I	Pr.2	A bedchamber in the Lord's house.	140	
I	1	Padua. A public square.	253	
I	2	Padua. Before Hortensio's house.	280	
II	1	Padua. A room in Baptista Minola's house.	414	
III	1	Padua. Baptista's house.	83	
III	2	Padua. Before Baptista's house.	250	
IV	1	Petruchio's country house.	190	
IV	2	Padua. Before Baptista's house.	125	
IV	3	A room in Petruchio's house.	195	
IV	4	Padua. Before Baptista's house.	103	
IV	5	A public road.	80	
V	1	Padua. Before Lucentio's house.	127	
V	2	Padua. Lucentio's house.	201	

== The Tempest ==
Some of these synopses, in edited form, are from The Annotated Shakespeare for Colleges and Schools by Rev. David Bain, 1892.

Act	Scene	Location	Appr. # lines	Synopsis
I	1	On a ship at sea.	63	The play opens on board a ship having as passengers a king and his courtiers. The resources of the crew are taxed to the utmost in trying to cope with a storm which, evidently arising suddenly, eventually drives the vessel on a lee shore, apparently wrecked with loss of all hands. Alonso speaks to the boatswain kindly, Antonio and Sebastian with scorn and abuse, and Lord Gonzalo' is cheerful and witty to the last.
I	2	The island. Before Prospero's cell.	596	Prospero and his daughter Miranda are standing in front of their home on an island. Miranda has just witnessed the shipwreck, and, overwhelmed with grief at the suffering of those on board, she pleadingly entreats her father, who by his art has raised the storm, to quell its ravages. In justification, the old man narrates his own history antecedent to this shipwreck. Twelve years ago Prospero was Duke of Milan. Passionately devoted to his studies, he neglected dukedom and placed its management in the hands of his jealous brother Antonio. The latter confederated with Alonso, the King of Naples, to hold Milan as the fief of his crown, obtaining in return the aid of a Neapolitan army. With the help thus furnished, Antonio made himself master of Milan and ruthlessly turned the lawful duke and his infant daughter adrift in an open and worthless boat. Fortunately, Gonzalo, who reluctantly carried out his master's orders, provided the castaways with the necessaries of life and a bundle of books from Prospero's library. They were cast upon this island — their home ever since. Miranda is soothed to sleep. Prospero's summons Ariel, his spirit servant. From a conversation between the two, we learn that Sycorax, a witch and mother of the monster Caliban, was in former days banished from Argiers, and turned loose upon this island. For a dozen years this witch imprisoned Ariel in the trunk of a tree. Prospero, on arriving on the island, freed Ariel. In gratitude, Ariel has served Propero since then, who has further promised Ariel complete freedom on the accomplishment of certain tasks. Ariel recounts his management of the storm, and how he had provided that nobody died. All, safely landed, were dispersed in groups throughout the island. Ferdinand, King Alonso's son, almost frantic in despair, was sitting alone in an out-of-the- way creek, imagining that he alone was saved. When Ariel has fully reported his exploits, Miranda awakens. Her father suggests a visit to Caliban, his slave. This monster had, on the death of his mother, become lord of the island, where he was found by Prospero. Prospero says he at first treated Caliban kindness, teaching him language and astronomy, but soon perceived that the monster was only fit for serfdom. Suddenly reappearing, Ariel leads Prince Ferdinand into the scene. The prince and Miranda fall in love at first sight. Prospero, however, treats the prince harshly, accusing him of being a spy. Miranda endeavors to mitigate her father's harshness.
II	1	Another part of the island.	359	On another part of the island are King Alonso, Antonio, Gonzalo, Sebastian, Adrian, Francisco, and others. Alonso grieves because he believes his only son, Ferdinand, is drowned. Gonzalo tries to comfort him with little success. Antonio, Sebastian, and Adrian discuss the recent marriage of Alonso's only daughter Claribel and the Prince of Tunis, from whose wedding they were traveling home. Ariel enters and magically puts to sleep everyone except Antonio and Sebastian. Antonio suggests that Sebastian should murder his brother, King Alonso, and thus himself become King of Naples. They almost do so when the others awake.
II	2	Another part of the island.	170	Caliban is at work on his daily chores when Trinculo, the court jester, arrives. Caliban thinks Trinculo is one of Prospero's spirits. Stephano, the King's drunken butler, arrives. Caliban takes the butler for a god and swears loyalty to him. The three decide to be sole owners of the island.
III	1	Before Prospero's cell.	114	Ferdinand is hauling logs, a chore assigned him by Prospero. Miranda arrives to cheer and comfort him in his task. She is overjoyed to find that her love is reciprocated.
III	2	Another part of the island.	146	Stephano, Trinculo, and Caliban plot to kill Prospero. Stephano is to marry Miranda and become sole monarch. Ariel enters, and entices the three to follow him. They yield to Ariel's charms, having first consented to delay the execution of the plot.
III	3	Another part of the island.	126	Alonso and his courtiers continue to search for Ferdinand. They are almost overcome by exhaustion, but Sebastian and Antonio are glad that another opportunity will soon be afforded them of carrying out their plot upon Alonso. Invisible to all, Prospero and Ariel enter. A sumptuous banquet is provided before the eyes of the starving courtiers, who are invited to eat, and as they are about to partake, the feast is snatched away by an unseen hand. Ariel now upbraids them for their former crimes, especially the 'three men of sin,' Alonso, Sebastian, and Antonio. Believing Ariel's voice to be their own evil conscience, they rush off in frantic despair. Gonzalo urges the other members of the company to follow in haste to prevent, if possible, any disaster.
IV	1	Before Prospero's cell.	285	Prospero agrees to the betrothal of Ferdinand and Miranda. Following some fatherly advice to Miranda, he furnishes, for their entertainment, a masque, enacted by Ariel and Ariel's fellows. Ariel enters to say that Stephano, Trinculo, and Caliban are now on their way, still intent on their murderous project. At Prospero's command, Ariel places upon a line some 'trumpery' taken from Prospero's wardrobe, to catch, as he says, these thieves. Having entered, the drunken three now load themselves with the trumpery. Prospero sends after them his servant sprites, disguised as hounds, eventually driving the thieves into a stagnant pool.
V	1	Before Prospero's cell.	361	Ariel brings Alonso and his followers to Prospero to hear the sentence which Prospero is about to pronounce. Prospero reveals himself to his brother and to Alonso. Alonso, smitten with remorse, offers to resign the dukedom of Milan and bewails the loss of his son. Prospero remarks that he, too, has lost a daughter, and then, withdrawing a curtain, Ferdinand and Miranda are disclosed, playing at chess. Ariel brings in the master and the boatswain, from whom we learn that the ship has been refitted, that the crew are all safe, and that nobody has died. The wandering plotters, Sebastian and Trinculo, are also brought before Prospero to receive sentence. It is a light one, merely to trim and arrange Prospero's cell for the company's reception. Caliban is and Ariel are discharged from servitude.
Ep.	–	–	20	Prospero asks the audience for permission to leave the island and return to Naples.

== Sir Thomas More ==
Act	Scene	Location	Appr. # lines	Synopsis
I	1	London. A street.	131	
I	2	London. The Sessions House.	210	
I	3	London. A state apartment.	94	
II	1	Cheapside.	23	
II	2	Saint Martin's-le-Grand.	76	
II	3	The Guildhall.	50	
II	4	St. Martin's Gate.	248	
II	5	Cheapside.	177	
III	1	Chelsea. A room in More's house.	280	
III	2	Chelsea. Antechamber in More's house.	22	
III	3	Chelsea. A room in More's house.	342	
IV	1	Whitehall. The council chamber.	119	
IV	2	Chelsea.	96	
IV	3	The Tower.	29	
IV	4	Chelsea. A room in More's house.	190	
V	1	The Tower Gate.	69	
V	2	More's house.	57	
V	3	The Tower.	133	
V	4	Tower Hill.	124	

== Timon of Athens ==
Act	Scene	Location	Appr. # lines	Synopsis
I	1	Athens. A hall in Timon's house.	308	
I	2	A banqueting-room in Timon's house.	253	
II	1	Athens. A room in a Senator's house.	38	
II	2	Athens. A hall in Timon's house.	247	
III	1	Athens. A room in Lucullus' house.	57	
III	2	Athens. A public place.	83	
III	3	Athens. A room in Sempronius's house.	42	
III	4	Athens. A hall in Timon's house.	125	
III	5	Athens. The Senate House.	123	
III	6	Athens. A banqueting-room in Timon's house.	111	
IV	1	Outside the walls of Athens.	41	
IV	2	Athens. A room in Timon's house.	53	
IV	3	Woods and cave near the seashore.	560	
V	1	The woods. Before Timon's cave.	260	
V	2	Before the walls of Athens.	19	
V	3	The woods. A rude tomb near Timon's cave.	10	
V	4	Before the walls of Athens.	95	

== Titus Andronicus ==
Act	Scene	Location	Appr. # lines	Synopsis
I	1	Rome. Before the Capitol.	500	
II	1	Rome. Before the Palace.	142	
II	2	A forest near Rome.	29	
II	3	A lonely part of the forest.	306	
II	4	Another part of the forest.	57	
III	1	Rome. A street.	303	
III	2	A room in Titus' house.	85	
IV	1	Rome. Titus' garden.	130	
IV	2	Rome. A room in the palace.	184	
IV	3	Rome. A public place.	119	
IV	4	Rome. Before the Palace.	113	
V	1	Plains near Rome.	166	
V	2	Rome. Before Titus' house.	205	
V	3	Court of Titus's house.	200	

== Troilus and Cressida ==
Act	Scene	Location	Appr. # lines	Synopsis
I	Pr.		31	
I	1	Troy. Before Priam's palace.	114	
I	2	Troy. A street.	268	
I	3	The Grecian camp. Before Agamemnon's tent.	397	
II	1	A part of the Grecian camp.	117	
II	2	Troy. A room in Priam's palace.	219	
II	3	The Grecian camp. Before Achilles' tent.	257	
III	1	Troy. Priam's palace.	141	
III	2	Troy. Pandarus' orchard.	197	
III	3	The Grecian camp. Before Achilles' tent.	314	
IV	1	Troy. A street.	84	
IV	2	Troy. A court before Pandarus's house.	111	
IV	3	Troy. A street before Pandarus's house.	13	
IV	4	Troy. Pandarus's House.	154	
IV	5	The Grecian camp.	322	
V	1	The Grecian camp. Before Achilles' tent.	99	
V	2	The Grecian camp. Before Calchas's tent.	218	
V	3	Troy. Before Priam's palace.	122	
V	4	The plains between Troy and the Grecian camp.	34	
V	5	Another part of the plains.	50	
V	6	Another part of the plains.	34	
V	7	Another part of the plains.	21	
V	8	Another part of the plains.	22	
V	9	Another part of the plains.	10	
V	10	Another part of the plains.	57	

== Twelfth Night ==
Act	Scene	Location	Appr. # lines	Synopsis
I	1	Illyria. A room in Duke Orsino's palace.	43	
I	2	The sea coast.	66	
I	3	A room in Olivia's house.	121	
I	4	A room in Duke Orsino's palace.	45	
I	5	A room in Olivia's house.	285	
II	1	The sea coast.	41	
II	2	Illyria. A street.	38	
II	3	A room in Olivia's house.	169	
II	4	A room in Duke Orsino's palace.	131	
II	5	Olivia's garden.	178	
III	1	Olivia's garden.	160	
III	2	A room in Olivia's house.	73	
III	3	Illyria. A street.	53	
III	4	Olivia's garden.	363	
IV	1	Illyria, A street adjoining Olivia's house.	62	
IV	2	A room in Olivia's house.	119	
IV	3	Olivia's garden.	35	
V	1	A street before Olivia's house.	407	

== The Two Gentlemen of Verona ==
Act	Scene	Location	Appr. # lines	Synopsis
I	1	Verona. An open place.	143	
I	2	Verona. The garden of Julia's house.	147	
I	3	Verona. A room in Antonio's house.	92	
II	1	Milan. A room in the Duke's palace.	157	
II	2	Verona. A room in Julia's house.	22	
II	3	Verona. A street.	52	
II	4	Milan. A room in the Duke's palace.	214	Valentine, Sylvia, Thurio (a competitor to Valentine for Sylvia's love), and Speed await Proteus' arrival in Milan. Valentine and Thurio exchange verbal barbs, with Sylvia keeping the peace. Sylvia's father, the Duke, enters, commends Valentine to give Proteus a hearty welcome, then exits. Proteus arrives and is warmly greeted by all. Thurio and Sylvia exit, leaving Proteus and Valentine to talk. Valentine explains that he and Sylvia have plans to elope. Proteus reveals in a soliloquy that he has fallen in love with Sylvia and plans to have her for his own.
II	5	Milan. A street.	48	
II	6	Milan. A room in the Duke's palace.	43	
II	7	Verona. A room in Julia's house.	90	
III	1	Milan. An anteroom in the Duke's palace.	365	
III	2	Milan. A room in the Duke's palace.	97	
IV	1	The frontiers of Mantua. A forest between Milan and Verona.	76	
IV	2	Milan. Outside the Duke's palace.	139	
IV	3	Milan. Outside the Duke's palace.	51	
IV	4	Milan. Outside the Duke's palace.	201	
V	1	Milan. An abbey.	13	
V	2	Milan. A room in the Duke's palace.	59	
V	3	The frontiers of Mantua. A forest between Milan and Verona.	15	
V	4	The frontiers of Mantua. Another part of the forest between Milan and Verona.	179	

== The Two Noble Kinsmen ==
Act	Scene	Location	Appr. # lines	Synopsis
I	Pr.		32	
I	1	Athens. Before a temple.	267	
I	2	Thebes. The palace.	133	
I	3	Before the gates of Athens.	110	
I	4	A field before Thebes.	55	
I	5	Another part of a field before Thebes.	17	
II	1	Athens. A garden, with a prison in the background.	51	
II	2	The prison.	345	
II	3	The country near Athens.	99	
II	4	Athens. A room in the prison.	33	
II	5	Athens. An open place.	85	
II	6	Athens. Before the prison.	39	
III	1	A forest near Athens.	142	
III	2	Another part of the forest near Athens.	38	
III	3	Another part of the forest near Athens.	83	
III	4	Another part of the forest near Athens.	26	
III	5	Another part of the forest near Athens.	179	
III	6	Another part of the forest near Athens.	376	
IV	1	Athens. A room in the prison.	202	
IV	2	A room in the palace.	177	
IV	3	A room in the prison.	89	
V	1	Before the Temples of Mars, Venus, and Diana.	179	
V	2	A darkened room in the prison.	163	
V	3	A place near the Lists.	171	
V	4	A place near the Lists. A block prepared.	155	
Ep.	–	–	18	

== The Winter's Tale ==
Act	Scene	Location	Appr. # lines	Synopsis
I	1	Sicilia. An antechamber in Leontes' palace.	41	
I	2	Sicilia. A room of state in Leontes' palace.	536	
II	1	Sicilia. A room in Leontes' palace.	234	
II	2	Sicilia. The outer room of a prison.	80	
II	3	Sicilia. A room in Leontes' palace.	245	
III	1	Sicilia. A sea port.	27	
III	2	Sicilia. A court of justice.	264	
III	3	Bohemia. A desert country near the sea.	128	
IV	1		32	
IV	2	Bohemia. A room in the palace of Polixenes.	48	
IV	3	Bohemia. A road near the shepherd's cottage.	115	
IV	4	Bohemia. A shepherd's cottage.	895	
V	1	Sicilia. A room in the palace of Leontes.	281	
V	2	Sicilia. Before Leontes' palace.	155	
V	3	A chapel in Paulina's house.	184	
