= The History of Cardenio =

Lost Shakespearean play

The History of Cardenio, often referred to as simply Cardenio, is a lost play, known to have been performed by the King's Men, a London theatre company, in 1613. The play was attributed to William Shakespeare and John Fletcher in a Stationers' Register entry of 1653. The content of the play is not known, but it was likely to have been based on an episode in Miguel de Cervantes's Don Quixote involving the character Cardenio, a young man who has been driven mad and lives in the Sierra Morena. Thomas Shelton's translation of the First Part of Don Quixote was published in 1612 and would thus have been available to the presumed authors of the play.

Two existing plays have been put forward as being related to the lost play. A song, "Woods, Rocks and Mountains", set to music by Robert Johnson, has also been linked to it.

== Attribution ==
Although there are records of the play having been performed, there is no information about its authorship earlier than a 1653 entry in the Stationers' Register. The entry was made by Humphrey Moseley, a bookseller and publisher, who was thereby asserting his right to publish the work. Moseley is not necessarily to be trusted on the question of authorship, as he is known to have falsely used Shakespeare's name in other such entries. It may be that he was using Shakespeare's name to increase interest in the play. However, some modern scholarship accepts Moseley's attribution, placing the lost work in the same category of collaboration between Fletcher and Shakespeare as The Two Noble Kinsmen. Fletcher based several of his later plays on works by Cervantes, so his involvement is plausible.

== Synopsis of "Cardenio", the episode in the novel Don Quixote ==
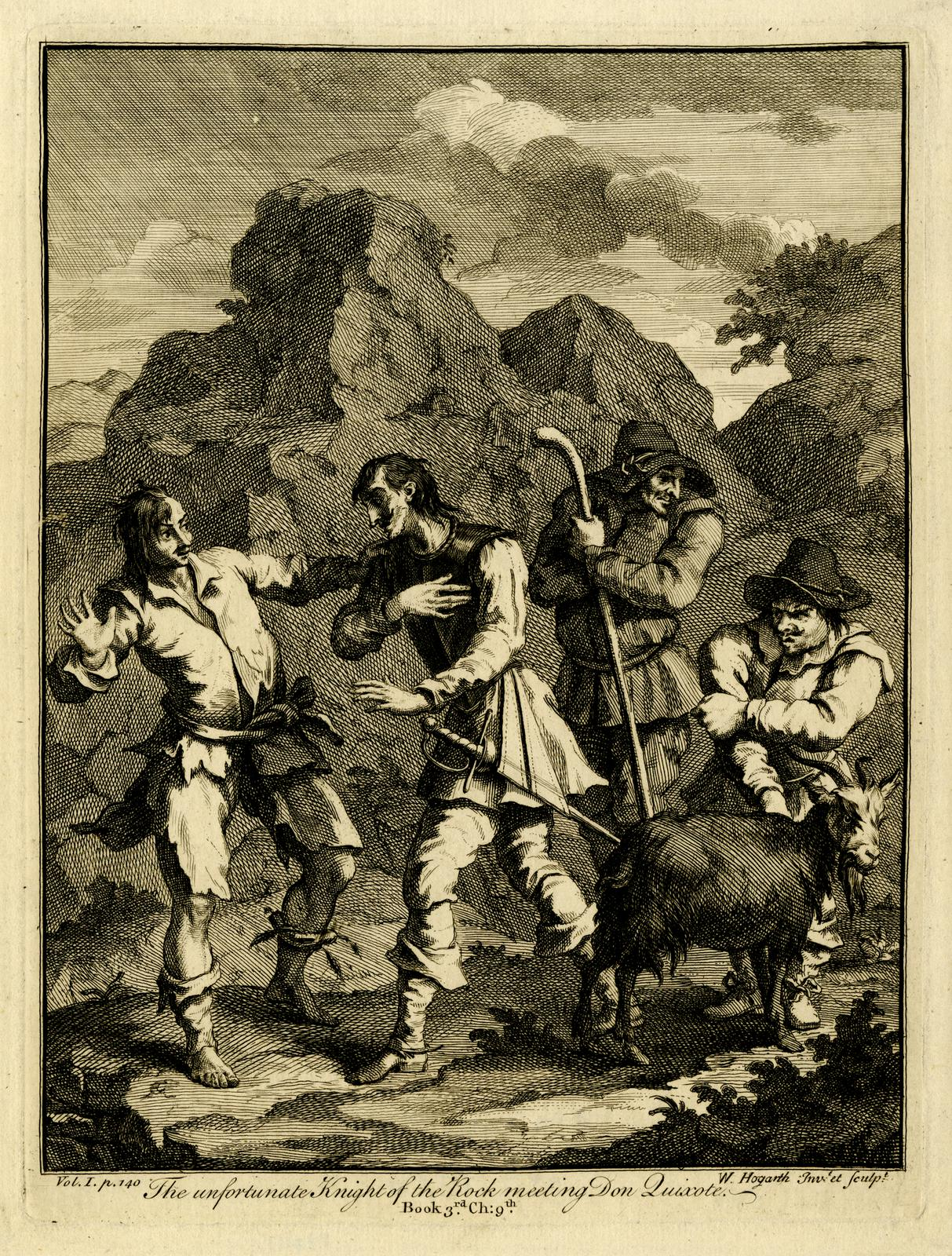
Illustration of c. 1726; Don Quixote (with sword) greets Cardenio (far left).

After a few adventures together, Don Quixote and Sancho Panza discover a bag full of gold coins along with some papers, which include a sonnet describing the poet's romantic troubles. Quixote and Sancho search for the person to whom the gold and the papers belong. They identify the owner as Cardenio, a madman living in the mountains.

Cardenio begins to tell his story to Quixote and Sancho: Cardenio had been deeply in love with Luscinda, but her father refused to let the two marry. Cardenio had then been called to service by Duke Ricardo, and befriended the duke's son, Don Fernando. Fernando had coerced a young woman named Dorotea into agreeing to marry him, but when he met Luscinda, he decided to steal her from Cardenio. At this point in Cardenio's narration, however, Quixote interrupts, prompting Cardenio to leave in a fit of violent madness. Quixote, inspired by Cardenio, decides to imitate the madness of various chivalric knights, and so sends Sancho away.

Coming to an inn, Sancho encounters the barber and the priest, who have been following Quixote with intentions to bring him back home. Following Sancho into the mountains, the barber and priest encounter Cardenio for themselves. Cardenio, back to his wits, relates his complete story to them: after sending Cardenio away on an errand, Fernando convinced Luscinda's father to let him marry Luscinda instead. Luscinda then wrote to Cardenio, telling him of the planned wedding, and of her intentions to commit suicide rather than marry Fernando. Cardenio arrived at the wedding and, hidden, saw Luscinda agree to the exchange of vows, then promptly faint. Feeling betrayed, Cardenio left for the mountains.

After concluding his story, Cardenio and the two other men stumble upon a woman, who is revealed as being Dorotea. Having been scorned by Fernando, she had traveled to confront him, only to learn the events of the wedding, including the discovery of a dagger on Luscinda's person after her fainting, and how she later ran away to flee Fernando and find Cardenio. Dorotea had then been driven into the mountains after her accompanying servant tried to force himself on her.

Reinvigorated by their meeting, Cardenio and Dorotea resolve to help each other regain their respective lovers. After helping the barber, the priest, and Sancho lure Quixote out of the mountains, Cardenio and Dorotea return to the inn with the others. At the inn, Cardenio and Dorotea find themselves suddenly reunited with Fernando and Luscinda. Cardenio and Luscinda redeclare their love for each other, while Fernando repents and apologizes to them all.

== Lewis Theobald and Double Falsehood ==
In 1727, Lewis Theobald claimed to have obtained three Restoration-era manuscripts of an unnamed play by Shakespeare, which he edited, "improved", and released under the name Double Falshood, or the Distrest Lovers. Double Falshood has the plot of the "Cardenio" episode in Don Quixote.

It has been suggested that Theobald was unable to publish the original script, because of Jacob Tonson's exclusive copyright on Shakespeare's plays. But that contention has been discounted, as the Tonson copyright applied only to the plays he had already published, not to any newly discovered play by Shakespeare; and Theobald edited an edition of the complete works for Tonson, whose commercial interests would have been substantially bettered if he had been able to advertise the edition as containing a hitherto "lost" play. (A prior instance of commercially "enhancing" an edition of Shakespeare's plays by adding new ones was the second reprint of the Third Folio of 1664, which added seven plays, only one of which (Pericles) has been accepted as at least partly by Shakespeare.)

The fate of Theobald's three alleged manuscripts is unknown. The very existence of three genuine manuscripts of that age is problematical, and Theobald was said to have invited interested persons to view the alleged manuscript, but he then avoided actually displaying them. These facts have led many scholars to conclude that Theobald's play was a hoax written by himself. However, more recent stylometric analysis may lead to the conclusion that Double Falsehood was based on one or more manuscripts written in part by Fletcher and in part by another playwright. The open question is whether that second playwright was Shakespeare. The text does not appear to contain many passages that may be even tentatively attributed to Shakespeare, but it is possible that Theobald so heavily edited the text that Shakespeare's style was entirely submerged.

In the late period represented by Shakespeare's known collaborations with Fletcher in Henry VIII and The Two Noble Kinsmen, his style had become so involved that it is difficult for a listener or even a reader to catch the meanings of many passages on a quick hearing or a first read, so Theobald might have found it necessary to alter the text in a way that made Shakespeare's voice unrecognisable. However historian Michael Wood has found an "idiosyncratic" verse in the Theobald adaptation which he believes could only have been written by Shakespeare. Wood also asserts that the lyrics of at least one song by Shakespeare's regular collaborator, composer Robert Johnson, are related to Double Falsehood, indicating that Theobald had access to a genuine original text. As "Double Falsehood" is substantially shorter than any other play of Shakespeare's and is completely lacking in a subplot, which all other Shakespearean plays have, it is likely that one of Theobald's revisions was to remove a subplot from his manuscript version. The removed subplot likely would have included the characters of Don Quixote and Sancho, who are conspicuously absent from Double Falsehood.

In 2010, the Arden Shakespeare published Double Falsehood in its series of scholarly editions of Shakespeare's collected works. The editor, Professor Brean Hammond, made a case for the Shakespearean origins of Theobald's play. In 2011 the Royal Shakespeare Company presented an adaptation of Double Falsehood as "Cardenio, Shakespeare's 'lost play' re-imagined," directed by Gregory Doran. The critic Michael Billington believes that this version is more suggestive of Fletcher than Shakespeare. In 2012 Terri Bourus directed a production of Gary Taylor's "unadaptation" of Cardenio, an attempt to reverse Theobald's alterations of the original. Taylor's text, along with detailed evidence supporting the view that Theobald had used the original playscript, was published in a collection of essays the following year. This text subsequently received its UK premiere on 18 March 2017 at the Mary Wallace Theatre, Twickenham, in a production by Richmond Shakespeare Society in association with Cutpurse.

=== Double Falsehood, a synopsis ===
The stage play Double Falsehood varies its tone from that of the episode in the novel and gives the story a fast-moving comic treatment. This is noted in the preface that Theobald wrote in 1727. All of the characters are given new names for the play: Don Fernando becomes Henriquez, Cardenio becomes Julio, Luscinda becomes Leonora, Don Bernard is Leonora's father, and Dorotea becomes Violante. The play borrows from the novel's plot events leading to and including the wedding: Henriquez is in love with Leonora, who has planned to wed Julio. Julio is sent away on an errand, and Leonora is forced to the altar. She gets a letter to Julio alerting him, and he arrives as the wedding is occurring. The bride has a dagger hidden on her in order to commit suicide. Julio jumps out from behind a tapestry to stop the wedding, but he is overpowered. Earlier on, Henriquez had raped Violante, which motivates him, at the end, to marry her in order to make up for his misdeed. A significant difference between the stage play and the novel, in addition to the absence of Don Quixote and Sancho, is that the play contains a series of dramatic encounters between the principals that do not occur in the novel.

== Charles Hamilton and The Second Maiden's Tragedy ==
In 1990, handwriting expert Charles Hamilton, after seeing a 1611 manuscript known as The Second Maiden's Tragedy (usually attributed to Thomas Middleton), identified it as a text of the missing Cardenio in which the characters' names had been changed. This attribution has not gained much support among other authorities.

Several theatre companies have capitalised on Hamilton's attribution by performing The Second Maiden's Tragedy under the name of Shakespeare's Cardenio. For instance, a production at Oxford's Burton Taylor Theatre in March 2004, claimed to have been the first performance of the play in England since its putative recovery (although a successful amateur production had premiered at Essex University's Lakeside Theatre on 15 October 1998).

A full production of the play, which noted the contested authorship, was mounted at the Next Theatre in Evanston, Illinois in 1998. Another production of the play, billed as William Shakespeare's Cardenio, was staged by the Lone Star Ensemble in 2002 in Los Angeles, directed by James Kerwin.

In 2010 the Aporia Theatre began work on a new edit from translator and director Luis del Aguila and director Jonathan Busby. It was presented under Busby's direction at the Warehouse Theatre, Croydon, in November 2010. Critic Michael Billington believes the play is more suggestive of Middleton than Shakespeare.

=== The Second Maiden’s Tragedy, a synopsis ===
The main plot of The Second Maiden’s Tragedy begins with "the Tyrant" overthrowing the previous king, Giovanus, and attempting to seduce Giovanus's wife, "the Lady". When the Lady rejects the Tyrant's advances, she and Giovanus are placed under house arrest. After another failed attempt at wooing the Lady, using her father as a middleman, the Tyrant sends soldiers to bring her to his bed by force. Learning of this, the Lady opts to commit suicide. Giovanus buries the Lady's body, but the Tyrant, driven by lust, digs the corpse back up. The ghost of the Lady appears to Giovanus, telling him of what the Tyrant has done. Meanwhile, the Tyrant, seeing how pale the corpse of the Lady is, sends for a painter to paint it. Giovanus, disguised as a painter, paints the corpse with poison. After the Tyrant kisses the corpse, he succumbs to the poison and dies, allowing Giovanus to return to the throne.

Hamilton argued that The Second Maiden’s Tragedy borrows for its plot the events of Cervantes' novel, leading up to the wedding ceremony of Luscinda and Don Fernando. According to him, Giovanus is Cardenio, the Tyrant is Don Fernando, and the Lady is Luscinda.

== Legacy and references ==
The History of Cardenio is the MacGuffin in the graphic novel La pièce manquante ("The Missing Play", 2023) by Jean Harambat. 18th-century actress Peg Woffington is on a quest to find the play so that she can be the first person to play Dorotea. She is helped by her manager and friend Ignatius Sancho, with the story highlighting the coincidence of Sancho's surname with Don Quixote's squire, and is opposed by several interests. In the end of the story, the main characters believe the last copy of Cardenio was accidentally destroyed, yet a few secondary characters have instead smuggled it and perform it, with few resources and an amateur troupe, in Libertalia.

== Bibliography ==
- Wood, Michael (2003). In Search of Shakespeare. London: BBC Worldwide. ISBN 0-563-53477-X.
