= Shakespeare by the Sea, Los Angeles =

American theatre company

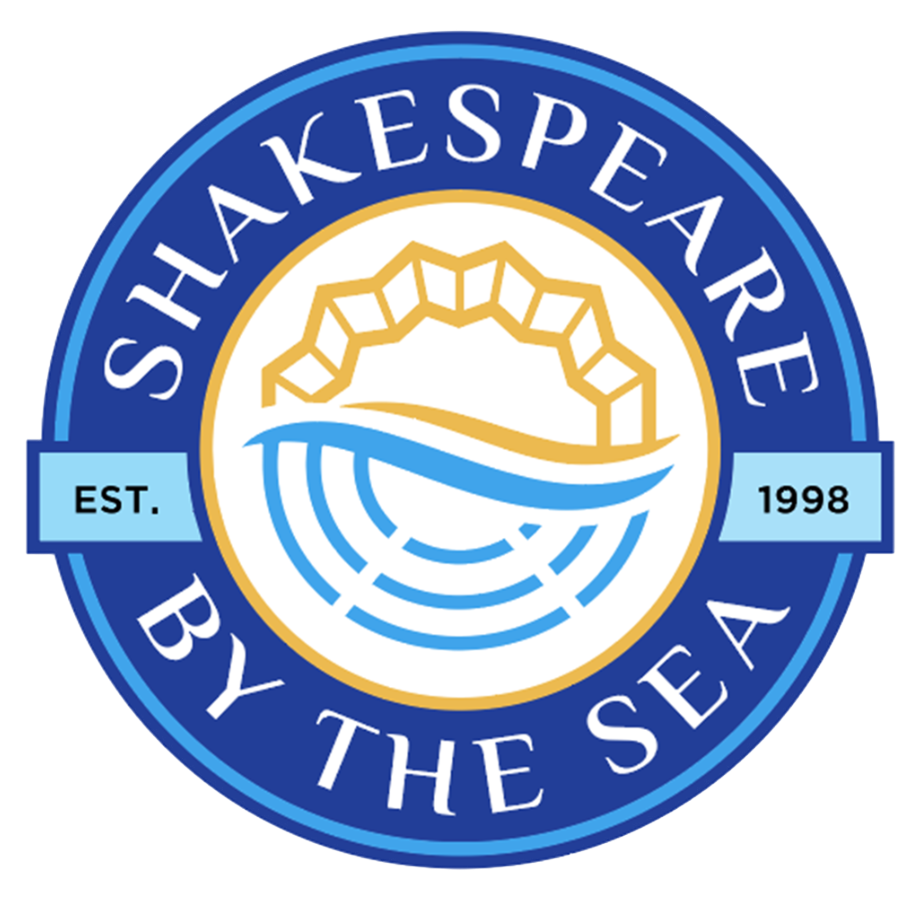

Shakespeare by the Sea is a nonprofit organization that was launched in 1998 by Producing Artistic Director Lisa Coffi. Shakespeare by the Sea offers a free repertory season that runs for ten weeks throughout Los Angeles and Orange County. All performances are admission free. Each summer, the company tours about 20 cities for as many as 40 performances.

Over the years, Shakespeare by the Sea has developed into a mid-sized arts organization with two core programs: the free summer repertory presented in Long Beach and then throughout the South Bay, Los Angeles and Orange County; and the Little Fish Theatre, a 60-seat black box theatre producing new, classic and contemporary works year-round in Redondo Beach.

Shakespeare by the Sea is supported by a combination of individual donations, government and arts program grants and corporate sponsorship.

Founding members of Shakespeare by the Sea are Lisa Coffi, Stephanie Courtney and Keith Gotowicki. The organization is currently run by Stephanie Coltrin and Suzanne Dean, Co-Artistic Directors.

Shakespeare by the Sea, Los Angeles is listed as a Major Festival in the book Shakespeare Festivals Around the World by Marcus D. Gregio (Editor), 2004.

== Past performances ==
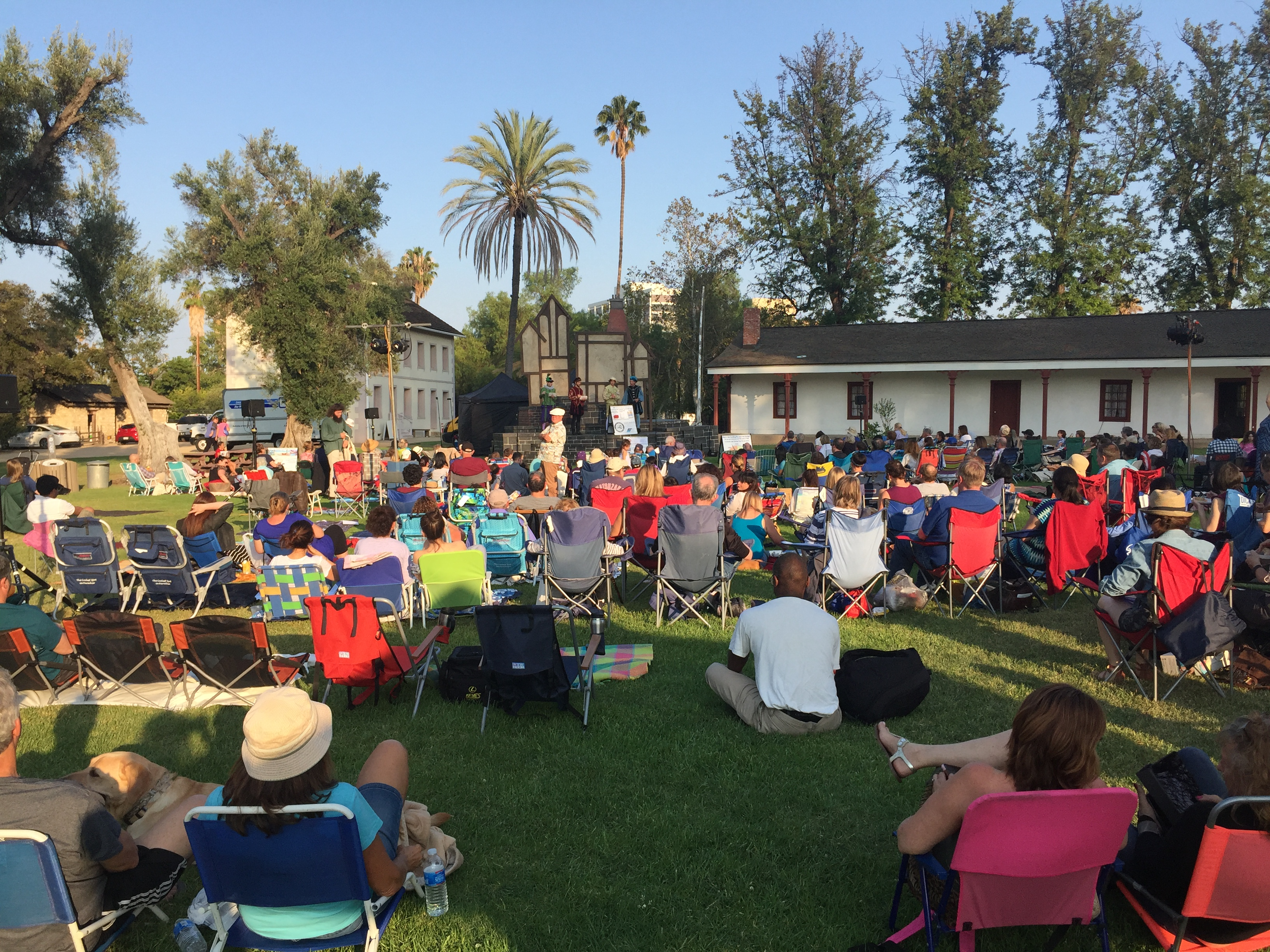
A crowd gathers for Merry Wives of Windsor at Los Encinos State Historic Park, Encino, CA (2018)

- 2026 Macbeth
- 2025 As You Like It and Julius Caesar
- 2024 Cardenio: or Double Falsehood and Henry IV (both Pt 1 and Pt 2)
- 2023 Twelfth Night and Hamlet
- 2022 Much Ado About Nothing and Romeo and Juliet
- 2021 Love's Labour's Lost and Richard III
- 2020 Titus Andronicus- streamed on YouTube
- 2019 The Comedy of Errors and Henry V
- 2018 The Merry Wives of Windsor and The Winter's Tale
- 2017 Taming of the Shrew and Macbeth
- 2016 Othello and Cymbeline
- 2015 As You Like It and The Tempest
- 2014 Midsummer Night's Dream and Hamlet
- 2013 All's Well that Ends Well and King John
- 2012 Romeo and Juliet and Two Gentlemen of Verona
- 2011 King Lear and Much Ado About Nothing
- 2010 Julius Caesar and Twelfth Night
- 2009 As You Like It and Love's Labour's Lost
- 2008 A Midsummer Night's Dream and Antony and Cleopatra
- 2007 Taming of the Shrew and The Merchant of Venice
- 2006 The Comedy of Errors and Hamlet
- 2005 The Merry Wives of Windsor and Othello
- 2004 Richard III and The Two Gentlemen of Verona
- 2003 Twelfth Night and Romeo and Juliet
- 2002 Much Ado About Nothing and Macbeth
- 2001 As You Like It and The Tempest
- 2000 A Midsummer Night's Dream
- 1999 The Taming of the Shrew
- 1998 The Comedy of Errors
