= Double Falsehood =

1727 play

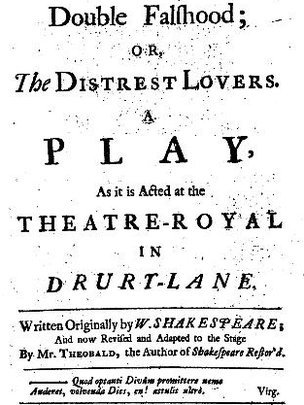
Title page of the 1st edition of Double Falshood.

Double Falsehood (archaic spelling: Double Falshood) or The Distrest Lovers is a 1727 play by the English writer and playwright Lewis Theobald, although the authorship has been contested ever since the play was first published, with some scholars considering that it may have been written by John Fletcher and William Shakespeare. Some authors believe that it may be an adaptation of a lost play by Shakespeare and Fletcher known as Cardenio. Theobald himself claimed his version was based on three manuscripts of an unnamed lost play by Shakespeare.

== Sources ==
The 1727 play is based on the "Cardenio" episode in Miguel de Cervantes's Don Quixote, which occurs in the first part of the novel. The author of the play appears to know the novel through Thomas Shelton's English translation, which appeared in 1612. Theobald's play changes the names of the main characters from the Spanish original: Cervantes' Cardenio becomes Julio, his Lucinda becomes Leonora; Don Fernando is turned into Henriquez, and Dorothea into Violante.

== Authorship ==
Publisher Humphrey Moseley was the first to link Cardenio with Shakespeare: the title page of his edition of 1647, entered at the Stationers' Register on 9 September 1653, credits the work to "Mr Fletcher & Shakespeare". In all, Moseley added Shakespeare's name to six plays by other writers, attributions which have always been received with scepticism.

Theobald's claim of a Shakespearean foundation for his Double Falshood was met with suspicion, and even accusations of forgery, from contemporaries such as Alexander Pope, and from subsequent generations of critics as well. Nonetheless, Theobald is regarded by critics as a far more serious scholar than Pope, and as a man who "more or less invented modern textual criticism". The evidence of Shakespeare's connection with a dramatization of the Cardenio story comes from the entry in the Stationers' Register, but Theobald could not have known of this evidence, "since it was not found until long after his death". There appears to be agreement among scholars that the 18th century Double Falsehood is not a forgery, but is based on the lost Cardenio of 1612–13, and that the original authors of Cardenio were John Fletcher and possibly William Shakespeare.

In March 2010, The Arden Shakespeare published Double Falsehood, with a "Note on this Edition" stating that the edition "makes its own cautious case for Shakespeare's participation in the genesis of the play," followed with speculations regarding how such a case might, in an imagined future, either be "substantiated beyond all doubt" or "altogether disproved". Arden editor, Brean Hammond, in the introduction, states that recent analysis based on linguistics and style "lends support" to the idea that Shakespeare and Fletcher's hand can be detected in the 18th century edition. Hammond then expresses the hope that his edition "reinforces the accumulating consensus that the lost play has a continuing presence in its eighteenth-century great-grandchild." Author and critic Kate Maltby cautions against promoting Double Falsehood with exaggerated statements. She points out that nowhere does the Arden editor of Double Falsehood make the "grandiose claim" found on advertisements for a production of the play that invite people to come and 'Discover a Lost Shakespeare'. She points out that if a young person sees a production of Double Falsehood, and is told it is by Shakespeare, they may come away with the "lifelong conviction that 'Shakespeare' is pallid and dull."

In 2015, Ryan L. Boyd and James W. Pennebaker of the University of Texas at Austin published research in the journal Psychological Science that reported statistical and psychological evidence suggesting Shakespeare and Fletcher may have coauthored Double Falsehood, with Theobald's contribution being "very minor". By aggregating dozens of psychological features of each playwright derived from validated linguistic cues, the researchers found that they were able to create a "psychological signature" (i.e., a high-dimensional psychological composite) for each authorial candidate. These psychological signatures were then mathematically compared with the psycholinguistic profile of Double Falsehood. This allowed the researchers to determine the probability of authorship for Shakespeare, Fletcher, and Theobald. Their results challenge the suggestion that the play was a mere forgery by Theobald. Additionally, these results provided strong evidence that Shakespeare was the most likely author of the first three acts of Double Falsehood, while Fletcher likely made key contributions to the final two acts of the play.

== Performance and publication ==
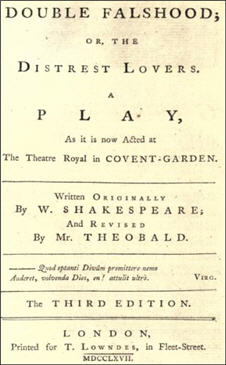
Title page of the 3rd edition of Double Falshood.

The play was first produced on 13 December 1727 at the Theatre Royal, Drury Lane, and published in 1728. The drama was revived at Covent Garden on 24 April 1749, and performed again on 6 May that year. Later performances occurred in 1781 and 1793, and perhaps in 1770 also. After the first edition of 1728, later editions appeared in 1740 and 1767.

=== Modern revivals ===
A new edition of the play was published in March 2010 in the Arden Shakespeare series. In January 2011 this version, advertised as by "William Shakespeare and John Fletcher", was presented at the Union Theatre, Southwark, by theatre company MokitaGrit, director Phil Willmott. Wilmott, while praising the "flashes of psychological insight" in the work, found himself unconvinced by the attribution to Shakespeare, noting the absence of comic interludes, the play's uncharacteristic structure and, above all, the absence of "heart-stopping moments of poetry". Certainly some typical Shakespearean plot elements, such as women disguised as men, a disaffected younger brother and a switch from scenes at court to one in the country are to be found, but the possibility remains that these were included by another as an "homage" to Shakespeare's style, or as a deliberate attempt to deceive. The critic Lyn Gardner found the work stageworthy, but also doubted the attribution, observing that it was "more of a curiosity than a classic".

In April 2011 the Royal Shakespeare Company presented a version of Double Falsehood as "Cardenio, Shakespeare's 'lost play' re-imagined." The text included "restored" elements of the plot based on Cervantes. The production received good reviews, but the critic Michael Billington believed that it was more suggestive of Fletcher than Shakespeare.

In August 2012, the Hudson Shakespeare Company of New Jersey staged an adaptation of Double Falsehood as part of their summer outdoor Shakespeare in the Parks season billing the show as "Cardenio, the lost Shakespeare". While the basic script adhered to the same structure of Double Falsehood, director Jon Ciccarelli modified the character names to match up with their Cervantes counterparts along with adding scenic material, music, stage combat choreography and dance to further flesh out the central Cardenio story.

In 2012 Terri Bourus directed a production of Gary Taylor's "unadaptation" of Cardenio, an attempt to reverse Theobald's alterations of the original. Taylor's text along with detailed evidence supporting the view that Theobald had used the original playscript was published in a collection of essays the following year.

As part of their 2024 season, Shakespeare by the Sea produced a new adaptation of Cardenio by Jonathan Fisher and Anna Miles, using an adapted text of Double Falsehood and adding a new frame story that follows Fletcher and Shakespeare's collaboration in composing the play.

== Cast ==
The 1728 edition provided a cast list for the main speaking parts in the original production:

Role	Actor
Duke Angelo	Mr. Corey
Roderick, his Elder Son	Mr. Mills
Henriquez, his Younger Son	Mr. Wilks
Don Bernard, Father to Leonora	Mr. Harper
Camillo, Father to Julio	Mr. Griffin
Julio, in love with Leonora	Mr. Booth
Citizen	Mr. Oates
Master of the Flocks	Mr. Bridgwater
First Shepherd	R. Norris
Second Shepherd	Mr. Ray
Leonora	Mrs. Porter
Violante	Mrs. Booth

The play's minor roles, of servants, messengers, and others, were omitted from the dramatis personae.

The cast's Wilks and Booth were Robert Wilks and Barton Booth, both prominent actors of their generation. The Mrs. Booth who played Violante was the former Hester Santlow; Mary Porter played Leonora.

== Synopsis ==
The play is set in "the province of Andalusia in Spain". The opening scene introduces Duke Angelo and his elder son and heir, Roderick. Roderick is the dutiful and virtuous son; the Duke also has a younger son, Henriquez, a scapegrace and prodigal who is absent from the ducal court, pursuing his own interests. Henriquez has just written his father a letter, requesting gold to buy a horse; Henriquez will send his friend Julio to court to receive payment. The Duke and Roderick decide to use Julio for their own purposes: they will detain him at court "some few days...and assay to mould him / An honest spy" upon Henriquez's "riots".

Julio's father Camillo is not happy about his son's mission to court. Julio wants to arrange a marriage with Leonora; his intended bride is agreeable, and the call to court delays Julio's plan to obtain the consent of both their fathers. Julio leaves Henriquez behind him to further his suit with Leonora, a foolish trust. Henriquez has developed an infatuation with Violante, a beautiful and virtuous local girl of humble birth; she rejects his inappropriate solicitations. Henriquez forces himself upon her. Afterward, confronting his guilty conscience over his "brutal violence", Henriquez tries to convince himself that his act wasn't a rape, with the feeble rationalization that Violante did not cry out, however much she struggled physically.

His pangs of guilt do not prevent Henriquez from pursuing another scheme: in Julio's absence he is courting Leonora. (Henriquez admits in a soliloquy that he sent Julio away with this in mind. His pursuit of both Violante and Leonora is the "double falsehood" of the title.) The young woman is appalled and repelled by this, but her father Don Bernard wants the family connection with the nobility that their marriage will produce. Leonora sends a letter to Julio, and he returns in time to frustrate the wedding. Julio challenges Henriquez with his sword but is overwhelmed and ejected by Bernard's servants; Leonora faints and is carried out. Bernard discovers a dagger and a suicide note on his daughter's person, revealing her final determination to resist the forced marriage.

Julio and the two young women, each in a distraught state of mind, depart mysteriously; the fathers Camillo and Bernard are left to confront their own distress. Roderick arrives, and comforts the two old men. Their unhappiness works something of a reversal in each man's character: the formerly mild Camillo hardens his nature, while the formerly harsh Bernard dissolves in tears.

In Act IV the scene shifts from court and town to the wilds where the shepherds keep their flocks. Violante has disguised herself as a boy, and has become a servant to a master shepherd. Julio is also in the neighborhood, wandering distractedly, fighting with shepherds and stealing their food. The Master shepherd is a rare character in traditional English drama, who can actually recognize a woman when she's disguised as a boy. He makes a crude and unwelcome sexual advance toward Violante, which is interrupted by the arrival of Roderick. Henriquez has learned that Leonora has taken refuge in a nearby nunnery, and has gained his brother's help in a plan to retrieve her. Roderick has agreed, in part to keep an eye on his younger brother; he insists that Leonora be treated honourably, and given her choice whether to return with them.

Roderick is also clever enough to piece together the larger situation; he manages to bring Julio, Leonora, Violante, and Henriquez back home altogether. He engineers a grand confrontation and reconciliation scene at the play's end: Julio and Leonora and happily re-united, and a now-repentant Henriquez wants to marry Violante to make up for his crime. The three fathers acquiesce to this arrangement.

== Versions of pastoral ==
Theobald takes a very different approach to the pastoral genre and theme, compared to Shakespeare and Fletcher. In the pastoral tradition exploited by the earlier dramatists, the retreat to the primitive world of nature is a return to a rough but morally benign innocence. Theobald worked a century later in a different social and cultural frame; his shepherds are tougher, their life more bleak. Violante is surprised at the Master shepherd's sexual advances:

Who would have thought, that such poor worms as they,
(Whose best feed is coarse bread; whose bev'rage, water),
Should have so much rank blood?

In traditional pastoral, it is more commonly the well-fed denizens of court and city (in contrast to those who live and work in a closer relationship with nature) who are morally corrupt and sensual.
