= Unipolar emotions =

Totally good or bad emotions

Unipolar emotions refer to emotional responses to things that are either entirely positive or entirely negative, with no in-between. These emotional reactions become distinguished over time, causing the good things (like the "good old times") to be remembered better than they were, and the bad things recalled even worse than they might have been.
