= Emotional granularity =

Individual's ability to differentiate between the specificity of their emotions

Emotional granularity is an individual's ability to construct their emotions with specificity. Similar to how an interior decorator has concepts for fine gradations in shades of blue, where others might perceive a single color, an individual with high emotional granularity would be able to construct finely grained emotions. Someone with very low emotional granularity would construct their emotions more coarsely, perhaps only in terms of pleasure or displeasure.

Emotional granularity is a primary factor in emotional intelligence.

== History ==
The phenomenon of emotional granularity was discovered by the neuroscientist and psychologist Lisa Feldman Barrett. Barrett first reported on the phenomenon in 1995 but called it "differentiation" or left it unnamed. In 2004, Barrett coined the term emotional granularity.

Originally, Barrett hypothesized that emotional granularity was about the individual's ability to label the emotions they felt with precise words. Further research and new evidence led her to conclude that the hypothesis was incorrect, and granularity is about construction of emotion: the brain's ability to "create instances of emotion that are precise and context-specific." The outdated "labeling" definition remains widespread in both academic and popular writing.

== Valence and arousal ==
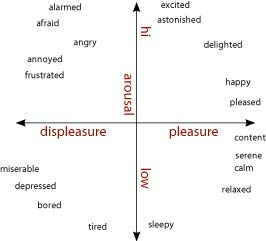
Valence–arousal circumplex chart

Affect can be mapped out on a chart modeling the range of arousal (high to low) and valence (pleasure to displeasure) that is experienced during a particular emotion. For example, in the top right corner are affective states with high arousal and high valence, which include excited, astonished, delighted, happy, and pleased. These are all examples of positive affective states that are high in arousal. In the opposite corner is the low valence and low arousal section, containing miserable, depressed, bored, and tired as some examples.

Using the latter as an example, an individual with high emotional granularity would be able to construct fine-grained instances of emotion such as depressed, bored, tired, and miserable. An individual exhibiting low emotional granularity would construct a less specific instance of emotion such as "unpleasant." In an experiment testing one's emotional granularity, a participant would be given hypothetical scenarios to determine their ability to construct emotions with more or less granularity. For example, researchers might present a traumatic situation to observe whether it induces anger, fear, frustration, or more than one of these emotions, indicating whether that participant is able to create discrete emotions, or instead clumps together these high arousal/negative emotions.

One influence on emotional granularity is language, even though emotion words are not the primary factor in emotional granularity. The speed and accuracy that one exhibits when verbalizing discrete emotion labels for oneself or another depends on the available emotion words.

== Experiments ==
To further research this concept, studies are being conducted to unveil what components contribute to one’s level of emotional granularity. Some of the aspects being looked at are an individual’s emotional intelligence, the method of self-reporting, and making emotional judgments about others.

=== Experience sampling ===
One way to eliminate the invalidity of conducting research in a lab and therefore creating a false atmosphere is experience sampling. This is a research method in which participants report on their emotions in the instance they are occurring. By giving participants a method of recording their feelings as they occur throughout the day, such as a Palm Pilot or journal, it is possible to gather more accurate data.

=== Lab studies ===
Other research methods being used are those that take place in lab settings, and provide just as much of a contribution to the research. One benefit of laboratory studies is that variations of valence and arousal can be controlled. In addition, it is important to determine a participant's emotional intelligence, or how much they know about certain emotions. By conducting computer-based tasks asking participants to judge their own or other’s emotions based on written scenarios or images, people’s emotional intelligence can be measured and compared to emotional granularity levels.

== Implications ==
From the limited amount of research that has been conducted on this topic, some implications have already been suggested. It appears that individuals show a wide range of emotional granularity, demonstrated in their self-reports and lab based studies. It has been suggested that high emotional granularity is beneficial for coping with emotional experiences because it allows one to construct their emotions more accurately and deal accordingly. Consistent with these findings, other studies have been conducted to test participants' judgment of facial emotions in comparison with their level of resilience, or ability to cope with stress. It was found that when shown neutral faces, participants with higher resilience categorized the face as a positive emotion, and those with low resilience chose a negative emotion category. In addition, this experiment found that participants had faster reaction times when distinguishing between emotions of opposite valence like happiness and sadness, in comparison with emotions of similar valence like sadness and fear. The concept of emotional granularity is still fairly nascent and requires further development, research, and awareness.

== See also ==
- Affect labeling
- Alexithymia
- Emotional intelligence
- Emotion regulation
