= Feudal barony of Eaton Bray =

English feudal barony founded in 1205

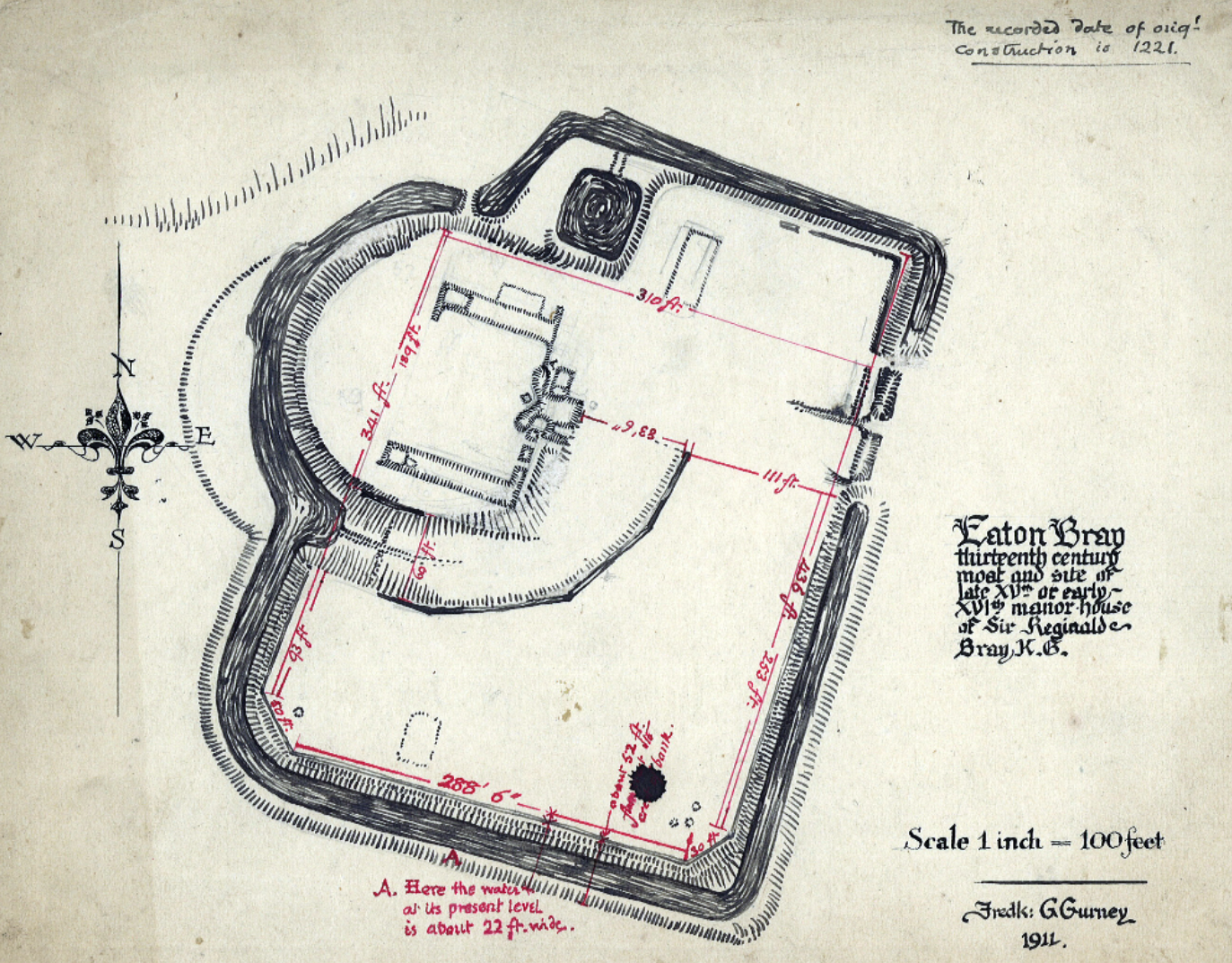
Moated site of Eaton Castle, drawn in 1911. Situated about 800 metres west of the village of Eaton Bray, now open to the public for fishing, operated by "Park Farm Fisheries"

Map of Normandy showing possible locations of origin for the English de Cantilupe family, feudal barons of Eaton Bray and Barons Cantilupe (1299)

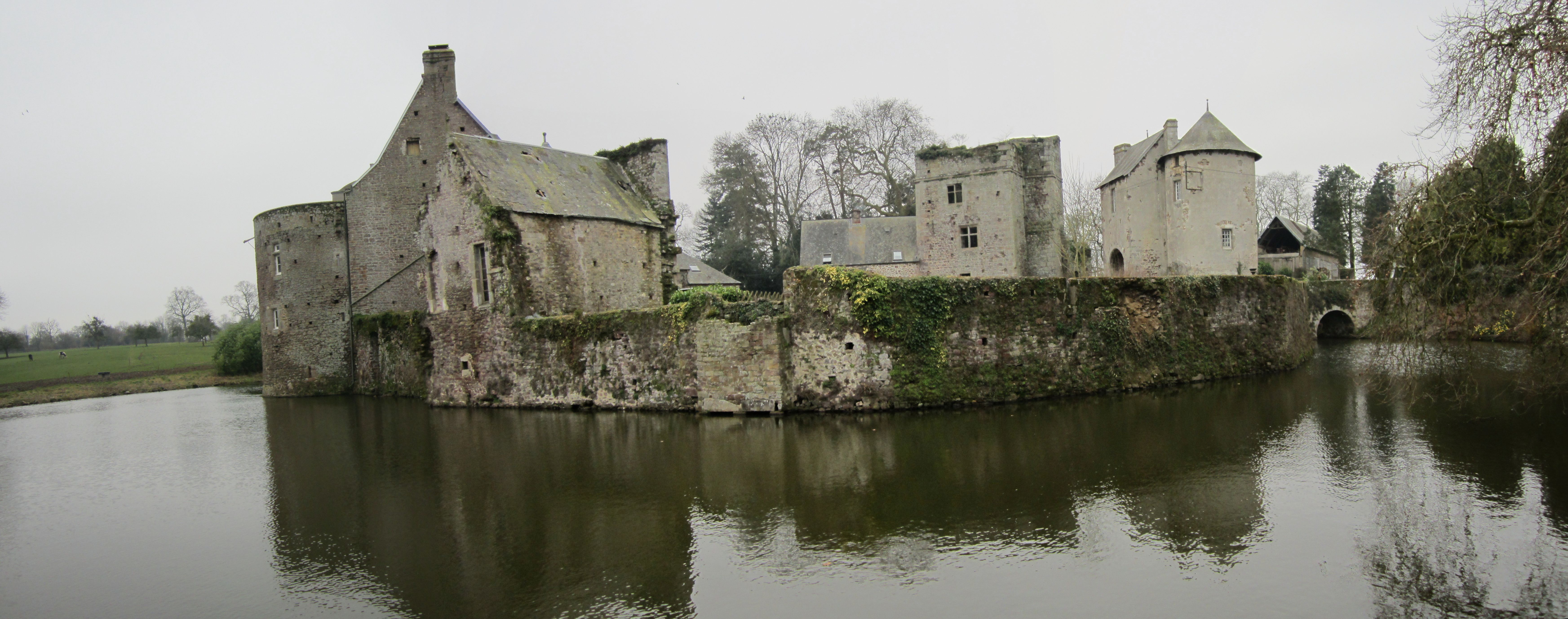
Château de Chanteloup, Bréhal, Manche, stated in several sources to be the most likely origin of the English de Cantilupe family, largely due to the existence of a castle of which no trace exists at the other two similarly named locations in Normandy

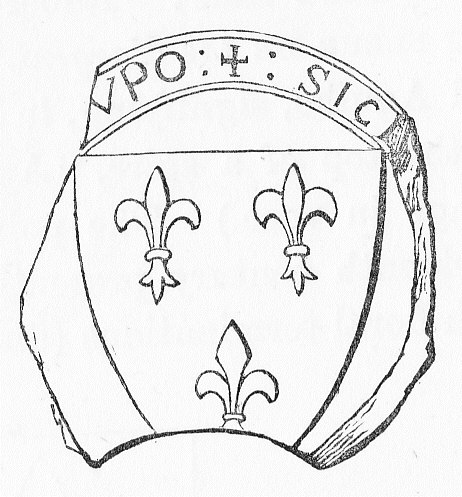
Left: Arms of William I de Cantilupe (d.1239), 1st feudal baron: Gules, three fleurs-de-lys or ("Cantilupe ancient"), as seen on his seal (right); in later generations the arms changed to three leopard's faces jessant-de-lys

The feudal barony of Eaton Bray in Bedfordshire was an English feudal barony founded in 1205 when the manor of Eaton (from 16th-century "Eaton Bray") was granted by King John to his household steward William I de Cantilupe (d.1239), together with many others, including Aston (later Aston Cantlow) in Warwickshire. In 1221 Cantilupe built a castle at Eaton, which became the caput of his feudal barony and was described by the monks of nearby Dunstable Priory in the Annals of Dunstable as being "a serious danger to Dunstable and the neighbourhood". The grant was for knight-service of one knight and was in exchange for the manor of Great Coxwell, Berkshire, which had been granted to him previously but the grant was deemed compromised. Eaton had been held at the time of William the Conqueror by the latter's uterine half-brother Odo, Bishop of Bayeux, but later escheated to the crown.

The de Cantilupe family which came to England at some time after the Norman Conquest of 1066 originated at one of three similarly named manors in Normandy, from which they took their name: Canteloup in Calvados, east of Caen; Canteloup in Manche east of Cherbourg on the eastern tip of the Cherbourg Peninsula (Cotentin); or Chanteloup in Bréhal, Manche, on the south-west side of the Cherbourg Peninsula, favoured by most sources as an ancient castle survives there. The place-name, common throughout France, signifies "wolf-song" which at such places was commonly heard.

== Descent ==
Arms of Thomas de Cantilupe (d.1282), Bishop of Hereford: Gules, three leopard's faces jessant-de-lys reversed or (adopted as the arms of the See of Hereford)

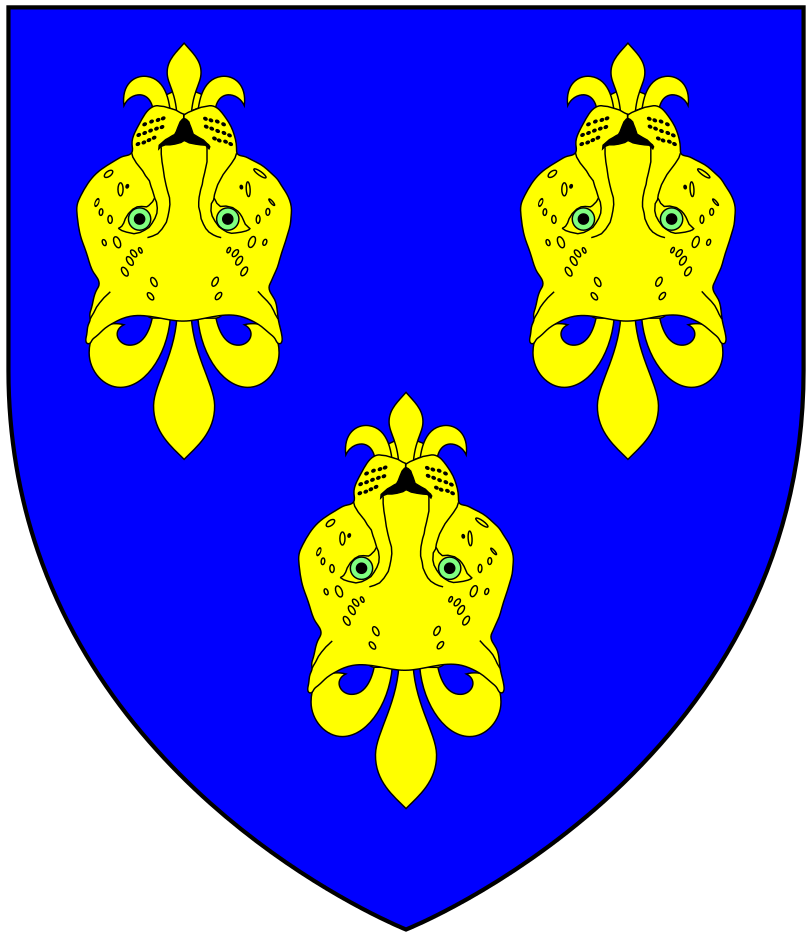
Arms of Cantilupe of Hempston Cantelow: Azure, three leopard's faces jessant-de-lys or, today quartered by Earls De La Warr

Arms of Cantilupe of Ravensthorpe and Greasley: Gules, a fess vair between three leopard's faces jessant-de-lys or

The descent of the feudal barony of Eaton was as follows:

- William I de Cantilupe (d.1239), 1st feudal baron, who married Mazilia (or Marcelin) Braci. His younger sons were Walter de Cantilupe (died 1266), Bishop of Worcester and Sir John I de Cantilupe (fl.1251) of Hempston Cauntelow near Totnes in Devon, who married Margaret Cumin, heiress of Snitterfield in Warwickshire. John's granddaughter and eventual sole heiress was Eleanor de Cantilupe, who married Sir Thomas West (1251-1344), whose descendants survive today as Earls De La Warr and quarter the arms of Cantilupe of Hempston as Azure, three leopard's heads reversed jessant-de-lys or.
- William II de Cantilupe (d.1251), eldest son and heir, 2nd feudal baron. He married Millicent de Gournay (or Maud), the daughter of Hugh de Gournai. His younger sons (who all adopted differences of their paternal arms) were:
  - Hugh de Cantilupe, 2nd son, Archdeacon of Gloucester;
  - Saint Thomas de Cantilupe (c.1218-1282), 3rd son, Bishop of Hereford, who adopted as his arms Gules, three leopard's faces jessant-de-lys reversed or, which became the arms of the See of Hereford;
  - Sir Nicholas de Cantilupe (d.1266), 5th son, who married Eustachia FitzHugh, heiress of Greasley Castle in Nottinghamshire, which he made his seat. His son and heir was William de Cantilupe, 1st Baron Cantilupe (1262-1308) of Ravensthorpe Castle in the parish of Boltby, North Yorkshire, who was created a baron by writ on his summons to Parliament in 1299. He married Eva de Boltby, heiress of Ravensthorpe and Boltby. He signed and sealed the Barons' Letter of 1301 as Will(ielm)us de Cantilopo, D(omi)n(u)s de Ravensthorp and was present at the Siege of Caerlaverock Castle in 1300, during which his arms were recorded in verse on the Roll of Caerlaverock, blazoned in standard form as: Gules, a fess vair between three leopard's faces jessant-de-lys or, still visible sculpted on the chest tomb supporting the effigy of the 3rd Baron (younger son of the 1st Baron) in Lincoln Cathedral. The male line died out on the death of the latter's son the 4th Baron in 1375.
- William III de Cantilupe (d.1254), eldest son and heir, 3rd feudal baron. His father had obtained the wardship and marriage of the great heiress Eva de Braose, heiress of the de Braose dynasty of Welsh Marcher Lords, and married her off to his son William. Thus in right of his wife (jure uxoris) he became feudal baron of Totnes in Devon and Lord of Abergavenny in Wales. His chief residences were at Calne in Wiltshire and Aston Cantlow in Warwickshire, until he inherited Abergavenny Castle and the other vast estates of that lordship.
- Sir George de Cantilupe (1251-1273), only son and heir who inherited aged 3, 4th feudal baron of Eaton, Lord of Abergavenny. The custody of his lands was held by the king during his minority (until the age of 21), thus for most of his short life, and the crown bailiffs are described in the Annals of Dunstable as being "very wicked and cruel. They vexed the Abbots of St. Albans and of Woburn very much, and especially us, who were unjustly amerced at 6 marks". He married Margaret de Lacy, and having inherited his vast estates died childless aged only 22. His 1274 inquisition post mortem describes the lay-out of the buildings of Eaton Castle in considerable detail. His co-heiresses were his two sisters:
  - Millicent de Cantilupe, died 1299,) who married firstly (as his second wife) to John de Montalt, who died in 1273, without issue. She remarried to Eudo la Zouche, and their descendants inherited, amongst others, the manors of Eaton, Calne and Harringworth, which they made their seat. Her eldest son was William la Zouche, 1st Baron Zouche (1276–1351), created Baron Zouche "of Haryngworth" in 1308.
  - Joan de Cantilupe, died 1271, who married Henry de Hastings (1225-1268). She was the heiress of Aston Cantelow.
