= De Cantilupe =

de Cantilupe (anciently Cantelow, Cantelou, Canteloupe, etc., Latinised to de Cantilupo) may refer to:

- George de Cantilupe (1252–1273), Lord of Abergavenny from the Marches of South Wales under Edward I of England
- Thomas de Cantilupe (1218–1282), English saint and prelate
- Walter de Cantilupe (died 1266), medieval Bishop of Worcester
- William I de Cantilupe (died 1239), Anglo-Norman baron and royal administrator
- William II de Cantilupe (died 1251), Anglo-Norman landowner and administrator
- William III de Cantilupe (died 1254), lord of Abergavenny in right of his wife, Eva de Braose

== See also ==
- Cantaloupe (disambiguation)
