= Zouche =

Zouche or la Zouche is a surname that may refer to:

- Alan la Zouche (disambiguation)
- Edward la Zouche, 11th Baron Zouche (1556–1625), English diplomat, lone voter against the condemnation of Mary, Queen of Scots (1459–1526)
- Edward Zouch (died 1634), a courtier to English kings James and Charles I, masque actor, and Knight Marshal of the King's Household
- Elizabeth Zouche (before 1496–after 1553), English abbess
- John la Zouche, 7th Baron Zouche, 8th Baron St Maur, Yorkist nobleman and politician
- John Zouche (disambiguation), three English Members of Parliament
- William Zouche or de la Zouche (1299–1352), Lord Treasurer of England and Archbishop of York
- William la Zouche, 1st Baron Zouche (1276/86–1352), English soldier
- various Barons Zouche surnamed la Zouche (in addition to those listed above)

== See also ==
- Zouch, a hamlet in Nottinghamshire, England
- Zouch (surname)
- Zouch Tate (1606–1650), English Member of Parliament
