= Huband baronets =

Extinct baronetcy in the Baronetage of England

- Escutcheon of the Huband baronets
- Creation date: 1661
- Status: extinct
- Extinction date: 1730
- Seat: Ipsley Court

The Huband Baronetcy, "of Ipsley in the County of Warwick", was a title in the Baronetage of England which was created on 2 February 1661 for John Huband, of Ipsley Court, then in Warwickshire.

== Background ==
The Huband family (anciently Hubald, Hubaud, Hubawde, Hybot, Hybbotts, etc., from about 1640 "Huband") held the manor of Ipsley at the time of the Domesday Book of 1086, when Hugh Hubald held it from Osbern FitzRichard of Richard's Castle in Herefordshire, and was one of his chief tenants also holding lands from him in Bedfordshire.

By the early 13th century the overlordship of Ipsley passed to the Cantilupe family of Aston Cantlow in Warwickshire, feudal barons of Eaton (Bray) in Bedfordshire. The Hubaud family, who remained their tenants at Ipsley, were granted a difference of the Cantilupe arms (modern) (Gules, three leopard's faces jessant-de-lys reversed or), first adopted by Saint Thomas de Cantilupe (c.1218-1282) (alias Cantelow, Cantlow, Cantelou, Canteloupe, etc., Latinised to de Cantilupo), Lord Chancellor of England and Bishop of Hereford. Similarly the jessant-de-lys Cantilupe arms were adopted by other of their tenants including John Woodforde (fl. 1316) of Brentingby in Leicestershire.

The baronets were descended from Sir John Huband, Constable of Kenilworth Castle, Sheriff of Warwickshire (1527 and 1544) and Steward of Robert Dudley, 1st Earl of Leicester. The baronetcy became extinct in 1730 on the death of the 3rd Baronet, at age 17.

== Huband baronets, of Ipsley (1661) ==
- Sir John Huband, 1st Baronet (1649–1710)
- Sir John Huband, 2nd Baronet (died 1717)
- Sir John Huband, 3rd Baronet (1713–1730)
