= Studley Priory, Warwickshire =

Former priory in Studley, Warwickshire

Coordinates: 52.2740°N 1.8943°W

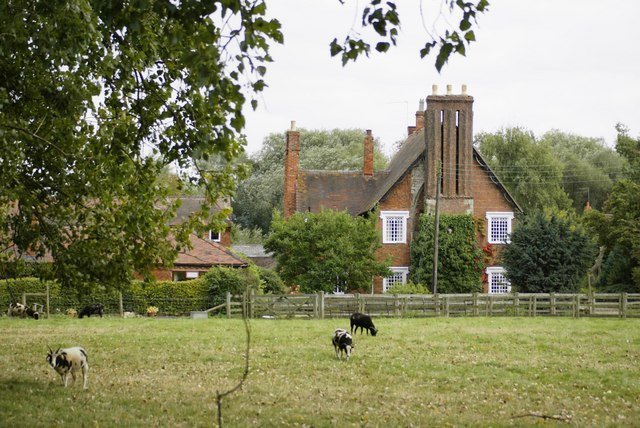
Priory Farm, Studley at the former site of the priory

Studley Priory, Warwickshire, was a priory in Studley, Warwickshire, England.

== History ==
The Augustinian priory was founded in the 12th century by Peter Corbizun, afterwards Peter de Studley, who transferred to Studley a priory of Augustinian Canons that he had founded at Witton, Worcestershire.

In the early 13th century the patron was William I de Cantilupe (died 1239), one of whose seats was nearby Aston Cantlow, buried at Studley Priory, who was also patron of the small priory on Steep Holm which transferred to Studley between 1260 and 1265. His grandson William III de Cantilupe (d.1254) was also buried at Studley, as was the latter's son and heir Sir George de Cantilupe (1251-1273), who inherited aged 3, 4th feudal baron of Eaton Bray in Bedfordshire, Lord of Abergavenny, who died childless aged 22.

When the priory was closed c. 1536 at the dissolution of the monasteries under Henry VIII it housed the prior and eight religious brethren. The priory and manor of Studley were granted to Sir Edmund Knightley, who used the buildings as a source of stone for other buildings.

Nothing remains today apart from the use of the name priory in a few local building names such as Priory Farm which, now much modernised, embodies a few fragmentary portions of a conventual building and is a Grade II* listed building. A gabled west wall of stone rubble contains the remains of a large 14th-century window. A few medieval sculptured fragments are built on to the walls.
