= William de Cantilupe =

William de Cantilupe may refer to:

- William de Cantilupe (died 1239), an Anglo-Norman baron and royal administrator.
- William de Cantilupe (died 1251), son of the above, an Anglo-Norman landowner and administrator.
- William de Cantilupe (died 1254), son of the second William, above
- William de Cantilupe (died 1375), murdered by his household
