= William de Cantilupe (died 1254) =

13th-century English nobleman

Arms of William III de Cantilupe: Gules, three fleurs-de-lys or ("Cantilupe Ancient"). These arms are blazoned in Glover's roll of arms and are as depicted by Matthew Paris (d.1259) in his Historia Anglorum, see below

William III de Cantilupe (died 25 September 1254) (anciently Cantelow, Cantelou, Canteloupe, Latinised to de Cantilupo) was the 3rd feudal baron of Eaton Bray in Bedfordshire, and jure uxoris (in right of his wife Eva de Braose, heiress of the de Braose dynasty of Welsh Marcher Lords) was feudal baron of Totnes in Devon and Lord of Abergavenny. His chief residences were at Calne in Wiltshire and Aston Cantlow (named after his family), in Warwickshire, until he inherited Abergavenny Castle and the other estates of that lordship.

== Origins ==
He was the eldest son and heir of William II de Cantilupe (d.1251) by his wife Millicent de Gournay (d.1260), a daughter of Hugh de Gournay and widow of Amaury VI of Montfort-Évreux (d. 1213), Earl of Gloucester. His uncle was Walter de Cantilupe (1195–1266), Bishop of Hereford and his younger brother was Thomas de Cantilupe (1220–1282), Bishop of Hereford and Chancellor of England, canonised in 1320.

== Marriage and progeny ==
Arms of William V de Braose (d.1230), as drawn by Matthew Paris (c.1200–1259) in his Historia Anglorum (folio 116): Party per pale indented gules and azure

At some time before 15 February 1248 he married his father's ward Eva de Braose (d.1255), a daughter and co-heiress of William V de Braose (d.1230), "Black William", Lord of Abergavenny, by his wife Eva Marshal, daughter and eventual heiress of William Marshall, 1st Earl of Pembroke. Eva's wardship and marriage had been purchased by his father in 1238. Eva is said to be represented by the surviving recumbent female effigy in the Priory Church of St Mary, Abergavenny (formerly the church of Abergavenny Priory), most of whose body is covered by a large shield sculpted with the arms of Cantilupe ancient (three fleurs-de-lys), and holding a heart in her hands. By Eva he had the following issue:

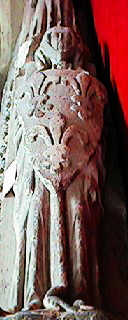
Effigy in the Priory Church of St Mary, Abergavenny believed to represent Eva de Braose (d.1255), wife of William III de Cantilupe

- Sir George de Cantilupe (1251–1273), Lord of Abergavenny, only son and heir, who inherited vast estates aged 3 and died in 1273, aged 22, shortly after having reached his majority and recovering his lands from royal wardship. He married Margaret de Lacy but died childless, leaving his sisters or their issue as his co-heiresses.
- Millicent de Cantilupe (d.1299). Her first marriage, before 1254 was as the second wife of John de Montalt, who died post-1265 without issue. Secondly, at some time before 1273, she married Eudo la Zouche (d.1279). Eudo was the younger son of Roger la Zouche (c.1175–1238) of North Molton in Devon and of Ashby in Leicestershire and the brother of Alan la Zouche (1205–1270), the latter of whom would become the grandfather of Alan la Zouche, 1st Baron la Zouche (1267–1314) "of Ashby." Millicent's moiety of her fraternal inheritance included: the feudal barony of Eaton Bray; the manor of Calne in Wiltshire (her father's seat); a moiety of the feudal barony of Totnes in Devon; the entire feudal barony of Bulwick in Northamptonshire and the manor of Harringworth in Northamptonshire, which her Zouche descendants made their seat, her son William la Zouche, 1st Baron Zouche (1276–1351) being created Baron Zouche "of Haryngworth" in 1308, to distinguish himself from his cousin Alan who had been made a baron in 1299.
- Joan de Cantilupe (d.1271), who married Henry de Hastings (1225–1268) of Ashill, Norfolk, whose wardship and marriage her father had purchased from Guy de Lusignan in about 1252. Her moiety of her fraternal inheritance included the vast lands of the Lordship of Abergavenny and Aston Cantlow Castle in Warwickshire, one of her father's principal seats. Joan was buried in the Greyfriars, Coventry, Warwickshire, in the Hastings Chapel, together with her husband Henry de Hastings and her son John de Hastings, 1st Baron Hastings, Lord of Abergavenny, all commemorated by effigies (now lost), as related by Dugdale. However, Joan de Cantilupe's heart was buried in Abergavenny Priory, and "her effigy there shows her holding a heart in the palm of her hand". The effigy supposedly of Eva de Braose with the Cantilupe shield is also holding a heart, but with both hands. Her sons were:
  - John Hastings, 1st Baron Hastings (1262–1313), Lord of Abergavenny, eldest son, who in 1273 inherited a moiety of the lands of his childless uncle Sir George de Cantilupe, including the Lordship of Abergavenny and the Cantilupe seat of Aston Cantlow in Warwickshire. He was summoned to Parliament as Lord Hastings in 1290. His grandson was Lawrence Hastings, 1st Earl of Pembroke, 3rd Baron Hastings (1318–1348).
  - Edmund Hastings, 1st Baron Hastings (post 1262-circa 1314) "of Inchmahome" (anciently Inchmacholmok), Perthshire, Scotland, summoned to Parliament on 29 December 1299 as "Lord Hastings". He died at the Battle of Bannockburn in 1314, having married but without issue.

== Death ==
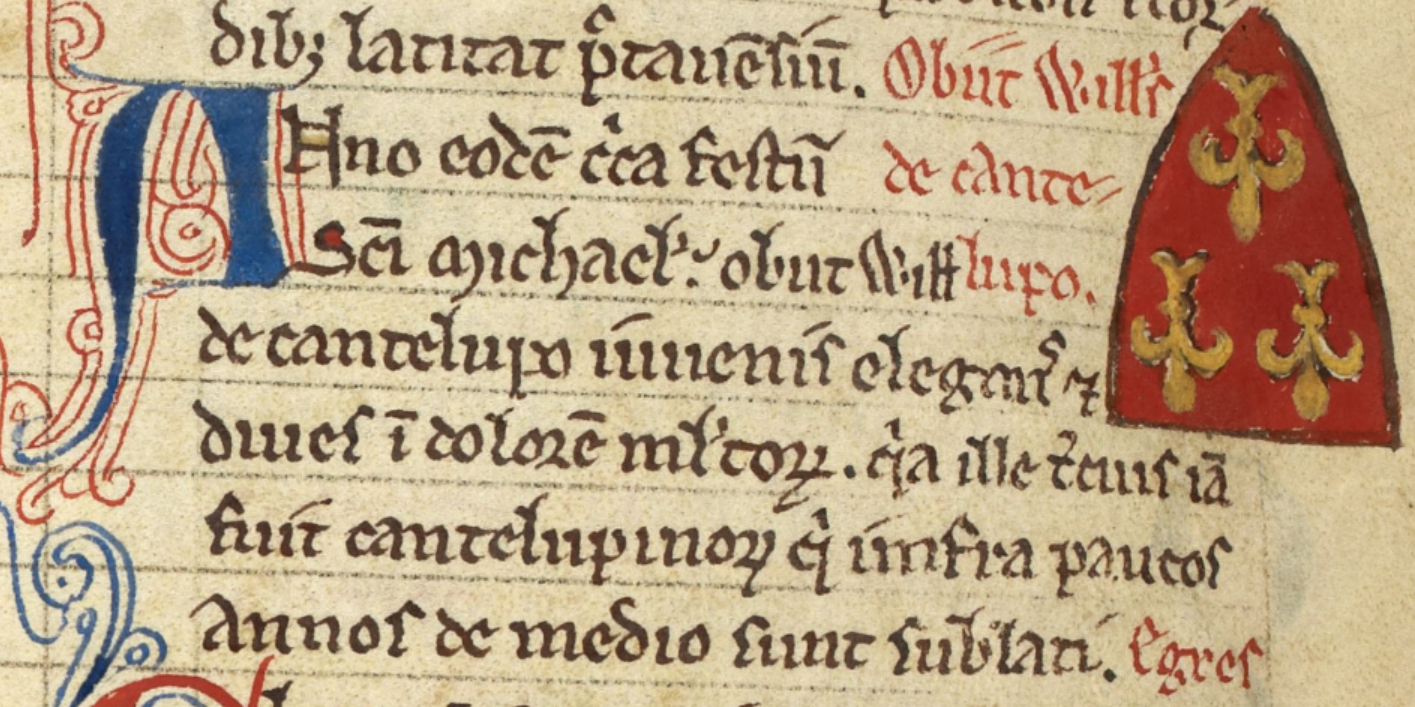
Record of the death of William III de Cantilupe made by Matthew Paris (d.1259) in his Historia Anglorum (folio 165v). His shield of arms is depicted in the margin inverted

Cantilupe died in 1254, at about Michaelmas, 29 September. His death is recorded by his contemporary Matthew Paris (d.1259) in his Historia Anglorum thus:

Obiit Will's de Cantelupo; Anno eodem circa festum sancti michaelis obiit Will(ielmus) de Cantelupo juvenis elegans et dives in dolore multorum quia ille tertius iam fuit Cantelupinorum qui infra paucos annos de medio sunt sublati ("W. de Cantilupe died; In the same year (i.e. 1254) around the feast of St Michael died William de Cantilupe, a fine and rich youth, in the grief of many because he was already the third of the Cantilupes who within a few years were lifted up from their midst").

(His father William II died in 1251 and his grandfather William I in 1239). One of the chief mourners at his funeral was Simon de Montfort, a close friend of the family.
