= Alan la Zouche =

Alan la Zouche may refer to:

- Alan la Zouche (c. 1136–1190), ancestor of the Barons la Zouche of Ashby
- Alan la Zouche (1205–1270), English nobleman and soldier
- Alan la Zouche, 1st Baron Zouche of Ashby (1267–1314)
- Alan la Zouche, 2nd Baron Zouch of Mortimer (1317–1346)
