= Harringworth =

Coordinates: 52.5676°N 0.6515°W

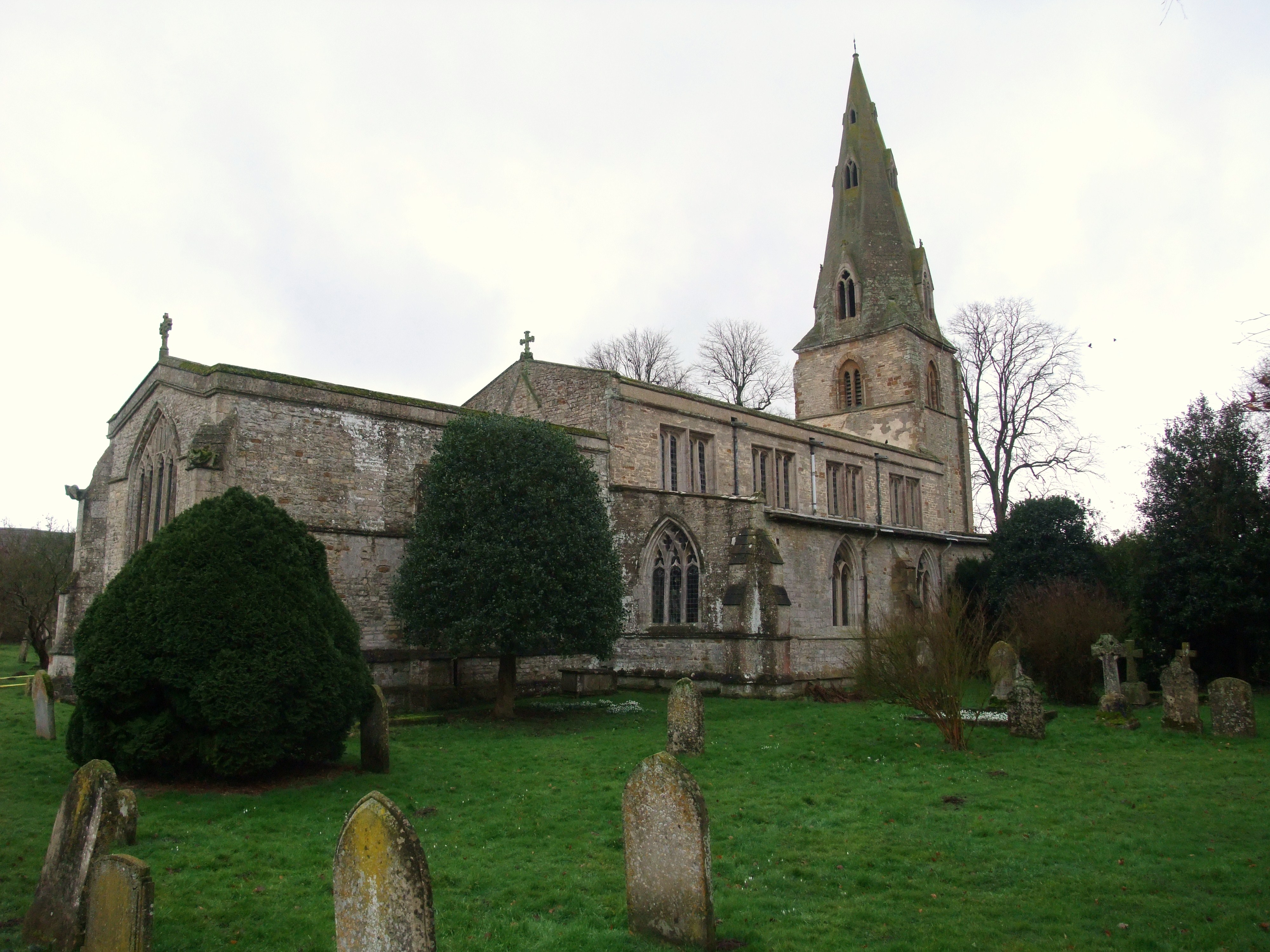
- Church of St John the Baptist, Harringworth

- Location within Northamptonshire
- Population: 241 (2011 census)
- OS grid reference: SP9197
- Civil parish: Harringworth
- Unitary authority: North Northamptonshire
- Ceremonial county: Northamptonshire
- Region: East Midlands
- Country: England
- Sovereign state: United Kingdom
- Post town: CORBY
- Postcode district: NN17
- Dialling code: 01572
- Police: Northamptonshire
- Fire: Northamptonshire
- Ambulance: East Midlands
- UK Parliament: Corby and East Northamptonshire

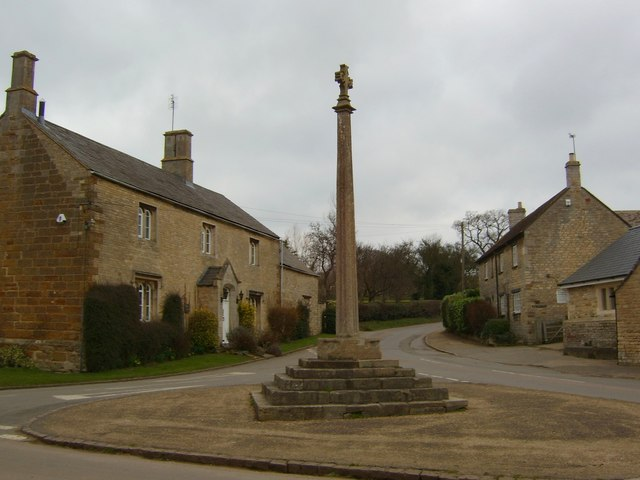
Harringworth Cross

Harringworth is a village and civil parish in North Northamptonshire, England. It is located close to the border with Rutland, on the southern bank of the River Welland, and around 5.3 miles (8.5 km) north of Corby. At the 2001 census, the population of the parish was 247, falling to 241 at the 2011 Census.

The area is dominated by the Welland Viaduct (known locally as the Harringworth Viaduct) that gracefully crosses the Welland and its flood plain immediately to the west of the village.

== History ==
The villages name origin is uncertain. 'Enclosure of the dwellers at the stone(y) place' or 'enclosure at Haering (= stone(y) place)'. Alternatively, the first element may be a personal name, 'Hering/Haerra'.

In 1086 Harringworth was considered a large village in the hundred of Corby, one of many possessions of the Countess Judith. The manor was acquired at some time before 1232 by William I de Cantilupe (died 1239), 1st feudal baron of Eaton Bray in Bedfordshire, who created a deer park, completed by 1234 when it was stocked with eight does and two bucks sent from Rockingham Forest. The last in the male line was Sir George de Cantilupe (1251–1273), 4th feudal baron of Eaton, Lord of Abergavenny, one of whose two sisters and co-heiress Millicent de Cantilupe married Eudo de la Zouche, whose descendants were seated at Harringworth and are known as Zouche "of Harringworth", created Baron Zouche in 1308, to distinguish them from the other branch of their family Zouche "of Ashby", created Baron Zouche in 1299. During the medieval period, Harringworth was associated with the la Zouche family who were Lords of the Manor and, commencing with William la Zouche, 1st Baron Zouche, were summoned to Parliament as Barons.

== Parish church ==
The Church of St John the Baptist, Harringworth is a Grade I listed building. It is part of the Lyddington benefice with churches in Rutland.

== See also ==
- Harringworth railway station
- RAF Spanhoe
