= Aston Cantlow =

Village in Warwickshire, England

Coordinates: 52.234372°N 1.797173°W

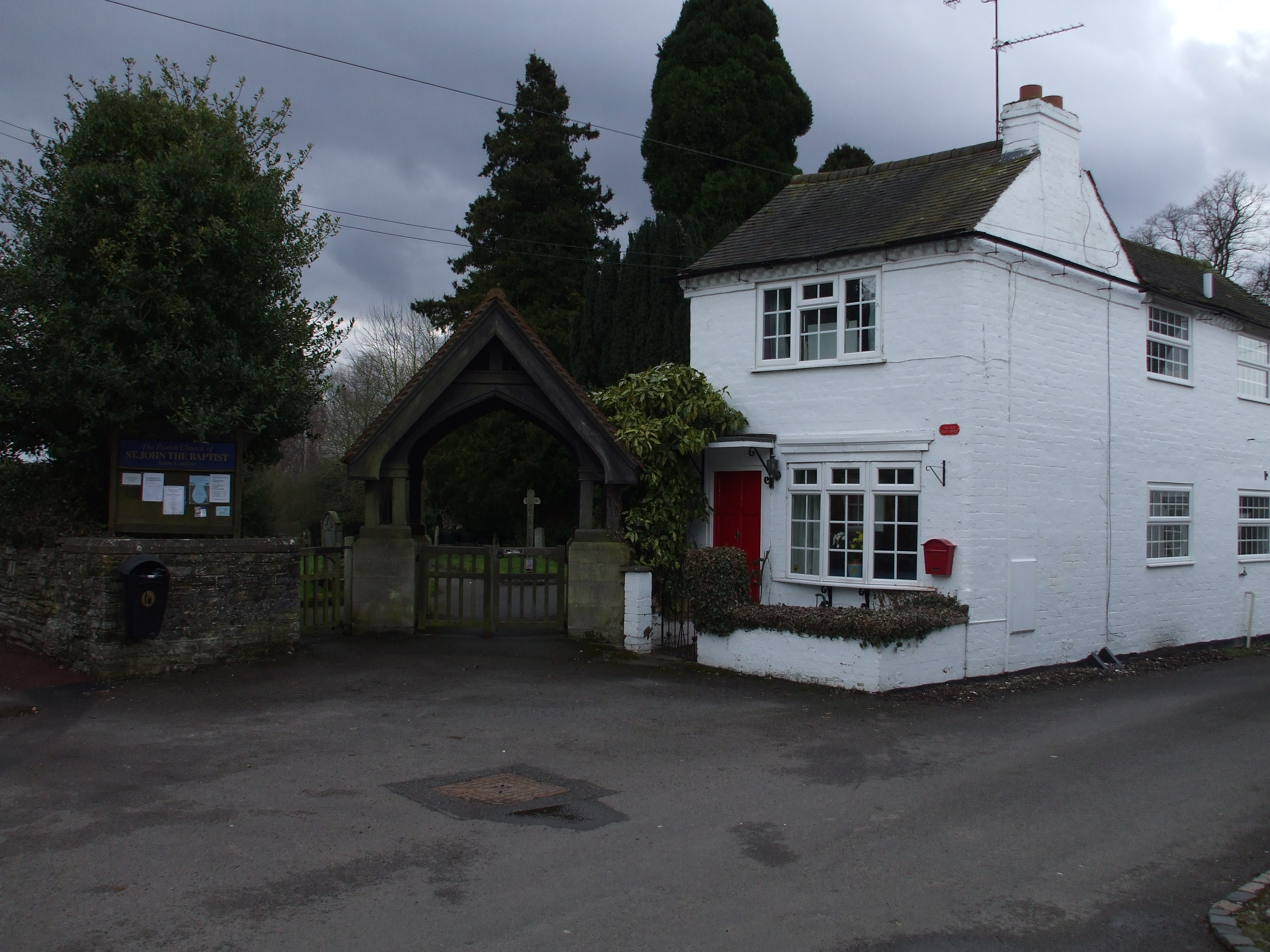
- Lych gate and Old Post Office

- Location within Warwickshire
- Population: 437 (2011)
- OS grid reference: SP139595
- Civil parish: Aston Cantlow
- District: Stratford-on-Avon
- Shire county: Warwickshire
- Region: West Midlands
- Country: England
- Sovereign state: United Kingdom
- Post town: HENLEY-IN-ARDEN
- Postcode district: B95
- Police: Warwickshire
- Fire: Warwickshire
- Ambulance: West Midlands

Aston Cantlow is a village in Warwickshire, England, on the River Alne 5 miles (8.0 km) north-west of Stratford-upon-Avon and 2 miles (3.2 km) north-west of Wilmcote, close to Little Alne, Shelfield, and Newnham. It was the home of Mary Arden, William Shakespeare's mother. At the 2001 census, it had a population of 1,674, being measured again as 437 at the 2011 Census.

== History ==
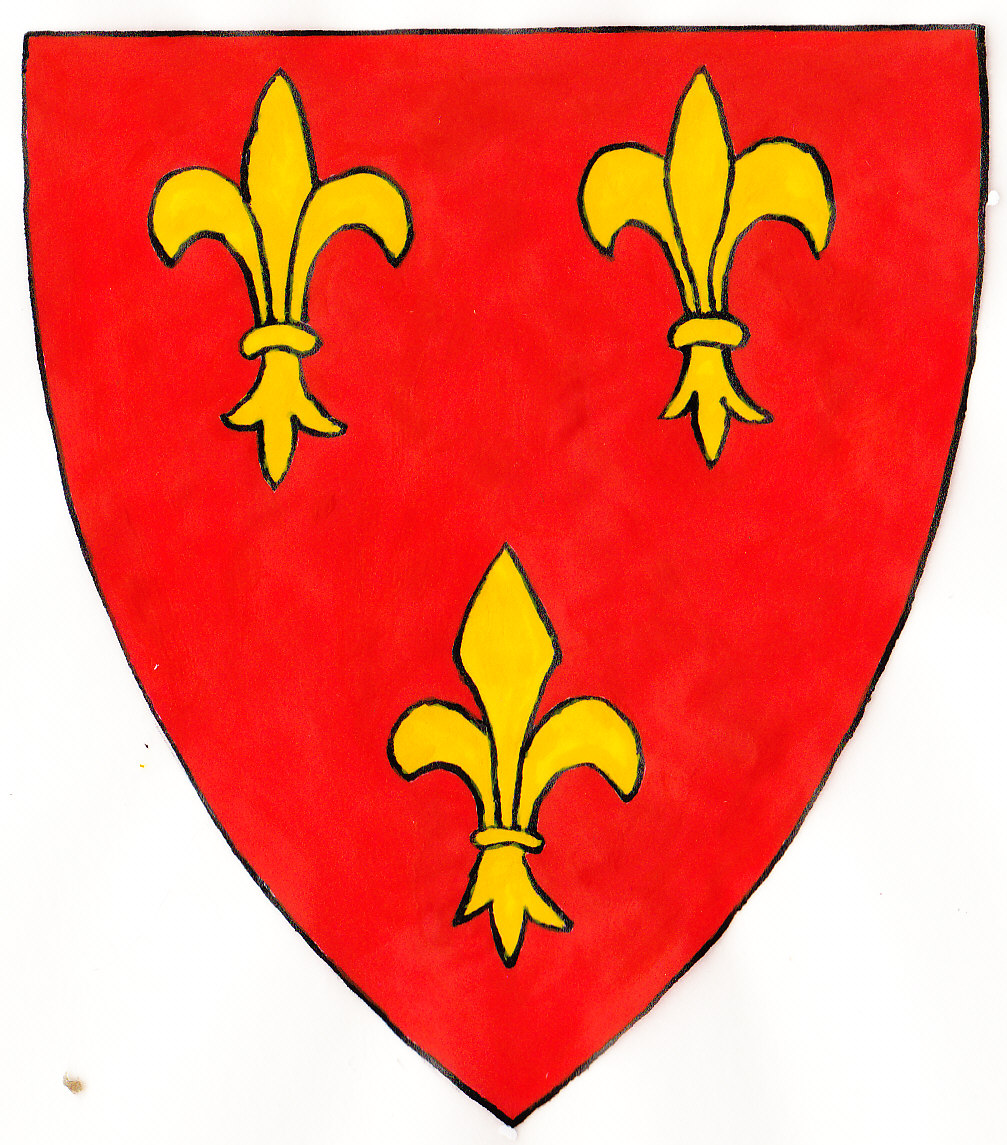
Early arms of the de Cantilupe family (until circa 1280) Gules, 3 fleurs-de-lys or ("Cantilupe Ancient"), afterwards changed to jessant-de-lys

Prior to the Norman conquest in 1066, the manor of Aston was held by Earl Ælfgar, son of Earl Leofric who had died in 1057, and the husband of Lady Godiva. Osbern fitzRichard, son of Richard Scrob, builder of Richard's Castle, was the holder in 1086 as the Domesday Book records:

In Ferncombe Hundred, Osbern son of Richard holds (Estone) Aston from the King. 5 hides. Land for 10 ploughs. 9 Flemings and 16 villagers with a priest and 10 small holders who have 12 ploughs. A mill at 8s and 5 sticks of eels; meadow, 40 acres; woodland 1 league in length and width. The value was 100s now £6. Earl Ælfgar held it.

Osbern fitzRichard died in 1137 and by 1169 the manor had passed to William the Chamberlain of Tankervill, who, by an undated grant gave all the land, between the river Alne and his manor of Estone to Winchcombe Abbey. This was on condition that it should remain uncultivated and that his men should enjoy the same common rights there as they had on the rest of his land. He was still holding the manor in 1177 and may have been succeeded by Ralph de Tankervill, who is referred to fifty years later as having formerly possessed it. It ultimately escheated to the Crown and in 1204 King John (1199–1216) granted it to William I de Cantilupe (died 1239), from whose family the village takes its name.

William's family name was added to the name of the manor of Aston, probably to differentiate it from another of the same name, in one of its many anciently-spelled varieties, Cantlow. William I de Cantilupe served King John as Justiciar and Steward of the Household, served several times as High Sheriff of Warwickshire, and from 1215 to 1223 was Governor of Kenilworth Castle. He attained the status of an English feudal barony, his barony, of which Aston became a member, having its baronial seat or caput at Eaton Bray in Bedfordshire. The family had been conspicuous for several generations, "evil councillors" of King John and his son Henry III, as Matthew Paris recorded, and strong supporters of the Crown against the Barons.

On his death in 1239 his son William II de Cantilupe (died 1251) succeeded him both in his estates and as Steward of the Royal Household. Either William II or his son William III de Cantilupe is referred to as holding the manor, valued at £40, by unknown Feudal land tenure, of the gift of King John. William Dugdale notes that the family remained lords of the manor in 1250. William III's younger brother Thomas de Cantilupe (died 1282), who never held the manor, became Bishop of Hereford in 1275 and in 1320 was canonised as St Thomas of Hereford. William III de Cantilupe died in 1254, leaving a three-year-old son George de Cantilupe (died 1273), later Baron Bergavenny, as his heir. During George's minority his wardship, and therefore the custody of the manor, was granted to the Queen of the Romans.

On his death in 1273, and having no children, the senior male line of the family died out, his heir being his nephew John Hastings and Baron Bergavenny (died 1313). John Hastings was eventually succeeded by his grandson Laurence de Hastings, who was created Earl of Pembroke in 1339, and the manor descended through his family until it passed for lack of heirs to a cousin, Sir William Beauchamp, who was summoned to Parliament as Baron Bergavenny in 1392. He died having settled it on his widow Joan for her life with reversion to their son and heir Richard and his daughter Elizabeth who married Edward Nevill, fourth son of Ralph Neville.

Richard, who was created Earl of Worcester, died in 1422 and Joan in 1435. The manor thus descended to Edward Nevill, created Baron Bergavenny in 1450, and remained in the family of Nevill, Barons, Earls, and Marquesses of Abergavenny, for over four centuries. In 1874 William Nevill, Marquess of Abergavenny, sold it to Thomas McKinnon Wood and in 1918 it was offered for sale by the Wood trustees. The estate was then broken up among the tenants: the Gild-house, to which the manorial rights attached, was bought by Sir Charles Tertius Mander of Wolverhampton, whose trustees became the lords of the manor.

== Economy ==
Paper making and sewing needle scouring were two major trades in the village in times past. The earliest reference to paper-making at Aston Cantlow occurs in the inclosure award of 1743, from which it appears that there must have been a water mill near the junction of the river Alne and Silesbourne Brook. Thomas Fruin of Aston Cantlow, paper-maker, is recorded in 1768 in the Abstracts of Title for Stratford-upon-Avon, About 1799 the mill near the church was converted into a paper-mill by Henry Wrighton, trade directories show that this family carried on the business until about 1845–50. Afterwards the mill was used by Messrs. Pardow of Studley for needle scouring, an industry which lasted here for about forty years. After a short period during the 1890s, during which the mill was used again for its original purpose, it became for a few years a factory for making ball bearings for bicycles before being finally abandoned in the 1920s. The village is now mainly agricultural; many residents commute to nearby cities for employment.

== Governance ==
Aston Cantlow is part of Stratford-on-Avon District Council. Nationally it is part of Stratford on Avon parliamentary constituency, whose MP following the 2010 election is Nadhim Zahawi of the Conservative Party. Prior to Brexit in 2020 it was part of the West Midlands electoral region of the European Parliament.

== Notable buildings ==
The church of St John the Baptist is principally in the Early English style consisting of a chancel, nave, north aisle, south porch, and an embattled and pinnacled western tower. Over the north doorway is a representation of the Nativity. The font, of octagonal quatrefoil panel design supported on a mutilated stem, is of late Decorated period. Here, it is believed that Shakespeare's parents, John Shakespeare and Mary Arden, were married in 1557. The survey of the clergy by the puritans in 1586 described the then vicar, Thomas Clarke, "parson no precher nor learned, yet honest of life & zealous in religion he hath 3 or 4 charges & cures beside that of Kynerton, he supplieth by his deputies, his hirelinges that serue by his non-residency are all dumbe & idle & some of them gamsters : vah of all Ixxx a yeare".

The most celebrated incumbent of Aston Cantlow was Thomas de Cantelupe, mentioned above, who held the living before his elevation to the See of Hereford. It became well known nationally after Aston Cantlow parochial church council made a controversial decision to demand £250,000 in chancel repair liability from the owners of a farmhouse next door to pay for repairs to the church. The village contains a number of black and white half-timbered buildings including the 16th-century Guild Hall and the 15th-century village pub, The Kings Head. The Gildhouse is traditionally believed to have been the hall of the guild that was in existence here in the time of Henry VI. It is first so called in a lease of 1713 (on surrender of one dated 1661) and as late as 1770 the upper chamber was reserved for manor courts. The building preserves externally much of its original appearance.
