= Zouch (surname) =

Zouch is a surname. Notable people with the surname include:

- Edward Zouch (died 1634), English courtier and masque actor
- Henry Zouch (c. 1725–1795), English antiquary and social reformer
- Henry Zouch (Australian) (1811–1883), Canadian-born Australian police officer and racehorse breeder and owner
- Richard Zouch (c. 1590–1661), English judge and Member of Parliament, cousin of
- Thomas Zouch (1737–1815), English clergyman and antiquary, brother of Henry Zouch

== See also ==
- Roger la Zouch (1292–?), English instigator of the assassination of the Baron of the Exchequer, Roger de Beler
- Baron Zouche
