= Synod of Worcester =

The Synod of Worcester (26 July 1240) was conducted at Worcester, England, by its bishop, Walter de Cantilupe. The diocesan synod was held in his cathedral. A number of statutes were settled regarding godparents, the life of the clergy and lay people. Among these were that godparents must be three in number, that games of religious mockery were prohibited, and that Lady Day—the Feast of the Annunciation of the Incarnation to the Virgin Mary—should be a day of rest with no servile work demanded or performed. Also forbidden to clergy was the playing of chess.

These reformations were in keeping with the guidance of the Fourth Lateran Council of 1215.
