= Thomas Bek (bishop of St Davids) =

Bishop, university chancellor

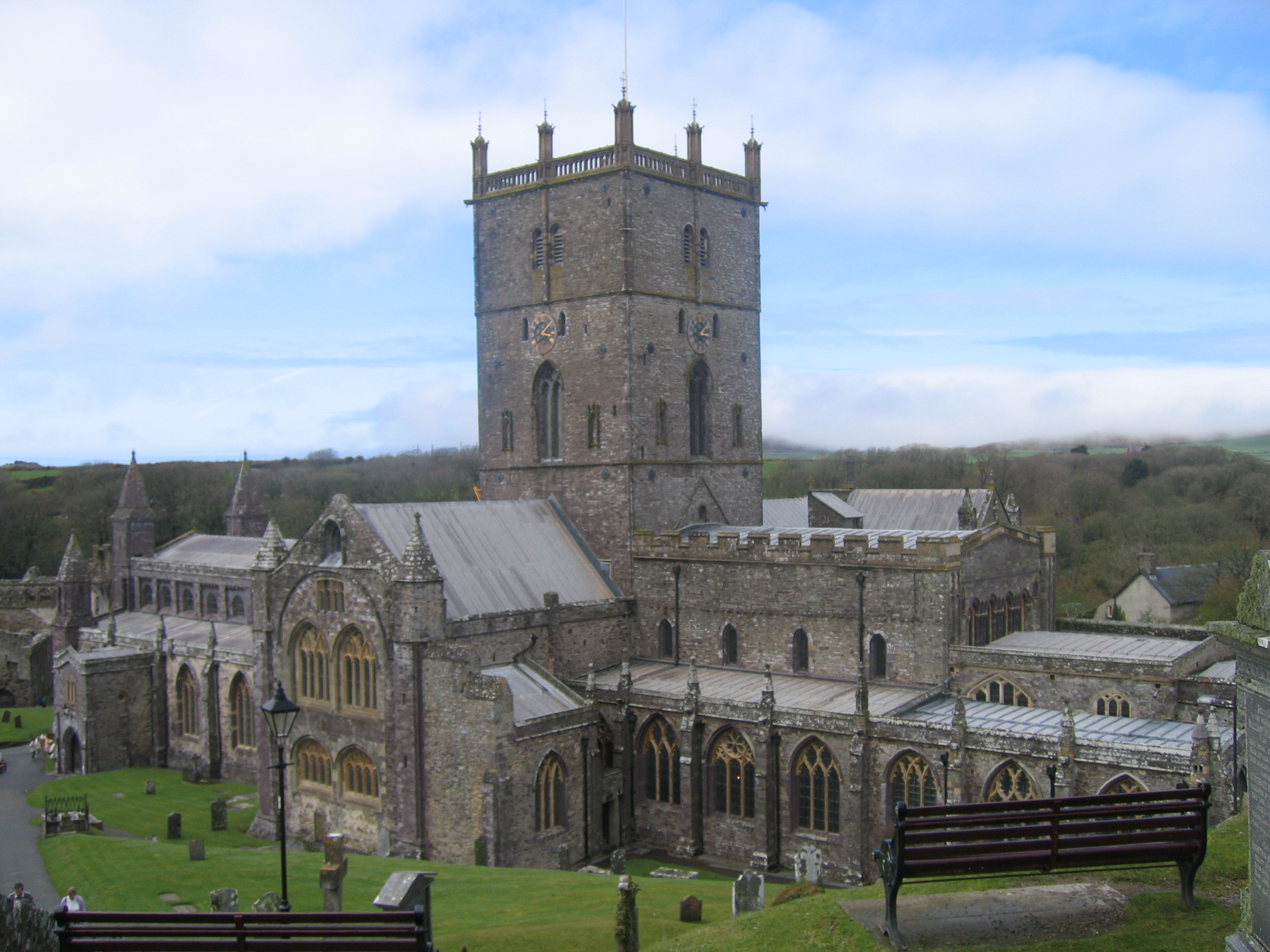
St David's Cathedral where Thomas Bek was bishop.

Thomas Bek, Beck, or Becke (died 12 May 1293) was a Bishop of St David's in Wales.

Bek was the second son of Walter Bek of Ereseby, Lincolnshire, England and the elder brother of Antony Bek, the Bishop of Durham.

Bek was educated at Oxford University. Between 1269 and 1273, he was chancellor of the university.

Thomas Bek entered the Royal Household as keeper of the wardrobe in October 1274 and was temporarily custodian of the Great Seal in 1279. He was a trusted servant of King Edward I and obtained many important and wealthy ecclesiastical positions. He was an Archdeacon of Dorset and became Bishop of St David's in 1280 until his death in 1293, founding two collegiate churches and two hospitals in the bishopric.

Academic offices
Preceded by Nicholas de Ewelme	Chancellor of the University of Oxford; 1269–1273	Succeeded by William de Bosco
Catholic Church titles
Preceded by Gerard de Grandson	Archdeacon of Dorset; 1275–1280	Succeeded by Henry Brandeston
Catholic Church titles
Preceded by Richard Carew	Bishop of St David's; 1280–1293	Succeeded by David Martyn
