= William la Zouche, 1st Baron Zouche =

13th and 14th-century English nobleman

William la Zouche
- 1st Baron Zouche of Harringworth
- Arms of la Zouche of Harringworth: Gules, ten bezants a canton ermine for difference. These are the differenced arms of Zouche of Ashby
- Born: 1277; Harringworth, Northamptonshire
- Died: 10 March 1352
- Spouses: Maud Lovell; Joan Leybourne
- Father: Eudo la Zouche
- Mother: Millicent de Cantilupe

William la Zouche, 1st Baron Zouche (1276/86–1352), lord of the manor of Harringworth in Northamptonshire, was an English baron and soldier who fought in the Wars of Scottish Independence. He is referred to in history as "of Harringworth" to distinguish him from his first cousin (of the senior line) Alan la Zouche, 1st Baron la Zouche (1267–1314) of Ashby de la Zouch in Leicestershire.

== Ancestry ==
William was the son of Eudo la Zouche (d. 1279) by his wife Millicent de Cantilupe (d. 1299), widow of John de Mohaut, daughter of William III de Cantilupe by his wife Eva de Braose, 3rd daughter and co-heiress of William de Braose, Baron Bergavenny. Millicent de Cantilupe was a great heiress, being a co-heir to her brother George de Cantilupe (d. 1273), Baron Bergavenny, feudal baron of Totnes in Devon (formerly held by de Braose), she was heiress of the English feudal barony of Eaton Bray (formerly held by Cantilupe) and of the manor of Harringworth, amongst many other lands.

William's younger brother was Roger la Zouch, Lord of Lubbesthorpe (d. 1303), father of Roger la Zouch the instigator of the murder of Roger de Beler in 1326. William's sister, Eva la Zouch, was married to the rebel Maurice de Berkeley, 2nd Baron Berkeley who was imprisoned in Wallingford Castle and died there also in 1326.

== Career and life ==
William inherited the manor of Harringworth, including a park and wood, upon the death of his mother Millicent de Cantilupe in 1299.

William was summoned to Parliament by writ as Baron Zouche of Harringworth from 1308 to 1325 and to serve against the Scottish from 1314 (after the disastrous Battle of Bannockburn) to 1317.

William was pardoned for his role in the death of Piers Gaveston in October 1313 but made a Conservator of the Peace in Northamptonshire from 1317 to 1321 and ordered to suppress illegal meetings.

In February 1322, William was ordered to muster as many men-at-arms and foot soldiers as he could and to march to the King to aid in the suppression of the rebels of Thomas, 2nd Earl of Lancaster. William declined and sent two men-at-arms in June, claiming ill health as his excuse.

Later in 1322, William was summoned to serve against the Scots and against Lancaster's rebels. He was summoned to defend Aquitaine in 1324, which was lost under the poor leadership of Hugh le Despenser, 1st Earl of Winchester, and to go to Gascony in 1325.

After Queen Isabella and Roger Mortimer, 1st Earl of March's successful overthrow of her husband, Edward II, William was summoned to the Parliament held in January 1327 which decided it had lost confidence in the rule of Edward and forced his abdication.

William died on 10 March 1352. Inquisition post mortems found he held land in Shropshire, Wiltshire, Norfolk, Bedfordshire, Buckinghamshire, Rutland, Warwickshire, Leicestershire, Lincolnshire, Northamptonshire and Worcestershire.

== Family ==
William married Maud Lovel (d. 1346), daughter of John Lovel, 1st Baron Lovel of Titchmarsh.

By her, William had at least ten children including:

- Elizabeth la Zouche (c.1284–1311), m. Sir Oliver de Ingham
- Eudo la Zouche (1297/8 – April 1326, Paris) m. Joan, daughter and heiress of William Inge (judge). Succeeded by his son William la Zouche, 2nd Baron Zouche.
- William la Zouche
- John la Zouche, elder
- Roger la Zouche
- Thomas la Zouche
- John la Zouche, younger
- Edmund la Zouche
- Millicent la Zouche m. William Deyncourt
- Isabel la Zouche
- Thomasina la Zouche
- Maude le Zouche (c.1290 – 31 May 1349), m. Sir Thomas Mallory, Knight (c.1287–1318) and had one child together: Sir Christopher Mallory, Lord of Hutton Conyers, York (c.1317–c.1378) who married Joan, (daughter of Robert Conveyors, of Hougton Convyers).

== Bibliography ==
Ancestors of Scott Wolter ~ Volume 2, Family Groups by Diana Jean Muir (2018) p. 234 – "Sir Thomas Mallory and Maud le Zouch, daughter of William Mortimer le Zouche and wife Maud Lovel. . . "

- Cokayne, George Edward (1893). Complete Peerage. Vol. 12. London: George Bell & Sons.
- Calendar of Inquisitions Post Mortem. Vol. III. London: HMSO. 1912.
- Calendar of Inquisitions Post Mortem. Vol. V. London: HMSO. 1908.
- Calendar of Inquisitions Post Mortem. Vol. VI. London: HMSO. 1910.
- Calendar of Inquisitions Post Mortem. Vol. X. London: HMSO. 1921.
- Patent Rolls. Westminster: Parliament of England. 1232–1509.
- Parliamentary Writs Alphabetical Digest. Vol. II. London: Public Record Office. 1834.

Peerage of England
New title	Baron Zouche of Haryngworth; 1308–1352	Succeeded by William la Zouche
