= Ipsley Court =

Country house in Worcestershire, England

Coordinates: 52.2975°N 1.9054°W

Ipsley Court was a 16th-century country house, much altered in the 18th and 20th centuries, situated at Ipsley, once Warwickshire, now since 1931, Worcestershire. It currently comprises two disconnected wings (known as Ipsley Court, and Ipsley Barn), both Grade II listed buildings which are in commercial use.

The Manor of Ipsley was held by the Huband family from Norman times. The house, originally comprising a central block and two wings to the north and south, was built for Sir John Huband Kt in the 16th century.

The estate was sold in 1724, following the death of Sir John Huband Bt. The new owner, the Rector Rev. John Dobson demolished the central block leaving two unconnected wings. The south wing was used residentially, the north was converted to a stable block.

In the mid 18th century the property passed to Samuel Savage, whose nephew Walter Savage Landor later restored the buildings and added an apselike structure to the south wing.

The property was much altered and modernised when it was converted to commercial use in the 20th century. For many years it was occupied by The Law Society, and now is occupied by the head office of Knights Pharmacy, a regional chain of pharmacies.
