= Richard Cunningham (botanist) =

British botanist

- Born: 12 February 1793; Wimbledon, Surrey, England
- Died: April 1835 (aged 42); Bogan River, New South Wales
- Cause of death: Killed by Indigenous Australians / Wiradjuri Tribe
- Occupation: Botanist
- Relatives: Allan Cunningham (brother)

Richard Cunningham (12 February 1793 – April 1835) was an English botanist who became Colonial Botanist of New South Wales and superintendent of the Sydney Botanic Gardens.

== Early life ==
He was born in Wimbledon, Surrey, England, the second son of gardener Allan Cunningham, who came from Renfrewshire, Scotland, and his English wife Sarah. Cunningham was educated at a Rev. John Adams Academy at Putney and then went to work for William Townsend Aiton on Hortus Kewensis for six years. For the next 18 years, he worked at the Royal Botanic Gardens, Kew, England, cataloguing specimens sent from Australia by his brother Allan.

== Australia ==
After being recommended for the position by both his brother Allan and botanist Robert Brown, Cunningham sailed to Australia to take up the position of Colonial Botanist of New South Wales and superintendent of Sydney Botanic Gardens, arriving in January 1833. Later that year he made an expedition to New Zealand, on HMS Buffalo. He was dropped off in the Bay of Islands and remained in Northland until March 1834 and was collected in May 1834, by HMS Alligator. While he was there he made a large collection of plants, amongst them a new orchid, Dendrobium cunninghamii, and the discovery of a new Hebe species. In 1834, he assisted John Lhotsky in the writing up for the botanical results of Lhotsky's expedition to the Australian Alps.

== Mitchell expedition and death ==
In 1835, Cunningham joined Thomas Mitchell's expedition to find the course of the Darling River. He caused Mitchell some concern by repeatedly straying away from the rest of the party in search of plants. One day near the Bogan River he failed to return, and a search organised by Mitchell—led by Mitchell's second-in-command, James Larmer—only found some of his belongings and his dead horse. A search party in November headed by Henry Zouch ascertained that Cunningham was camping with a group of aborigines, and was later killed by them when they became alarmed by his behaviour, thought to be the result of his delirious state. He was aged 42. His brother Allan paid for a memorial plaque to be placed in St. Andrew's Scots Church in Rose Bay.
