= Nicholas de Ewelme =

English university chancellor

Nicholas de Ewelme was an English medieval university chancellor.

From 1267 to 1269, Nicholas de Ewelm was Chancellor of the University of Oxford.

== See also ==
- Ewelme

Academic offices
Preceded by Thomas de Cantilupe or Henry de Cicestre?	Chancellor of the University of Oxford; 1267–1269	Succeeded by Thomas Bek
