= John Zouche =

John Zouche may refer to:

- John Zouche (died 1445), MP for Nottinghamshire (UK Parliament constituency)
- John Zouche (died 1585), MP for Hindon and Shaftesbury
- John Zouche (died 1586), MP for Derbyshire (UK Parliament constituency)

== See also ==
- John la Zouche, 7th Baron Zouche, 8th Baron St Maur (1459–1526), Yorkist nobleman
