= Edmund Hastings, 1st Baron Hastings =

13th-14th century English noble

Edmund Hastings, 1st Baron Hastings (died 1314), Lord of Inchmahome, was an Anglo-Scottish noble. He served as Governor of Perth, Governor of Berwick, Constable of Dundee and Sheriff of Berwick. He was killed during the Battle of Bannockburn against the Scots on 23 or 24 June 1314.

He was a younger son of Henry de Hastings and Joan de Cantilupe. Edmund fought at the Battle of Falkirk against the Scots in 1298 and was summoned to Parliament in 1299. He was at the Siege of Caerlaverock Castle in June 1300, with his brother, and attached his seal to the Barons' Letter of 1301 to Pope Boniface VIII. Edmund married Isabella, daughter of John Russell and Isabella, Countess of Menteith. He was killed during the battle of Bannockburn in 1314.
