= Henry Zouch (police officer) =

British army and police officer and horse racer (1811–1883)

- Born: August 18th, 1811
- Died: 28 October 1883 (aged 72)
- Spouse: Maria Brooks
- Relatives: 7 children

Henry Zouch (18 August 1811 – 28 October 1883) was a British army officer, New South Wales police officer, magistrate, racehorse breeder and racehorse owner. He was born in Quebec, Lower Canada and died in Goulburn, Colony of New South Wales.

== Early life ==
Eldest son of Lieutenant-Colonel Henry Zouch (d.1818), 10th Royal Veteran Battalion, and his second wife Ann, née Ritchie. Educated in 1826-28 at the Royal Military College, Sandhurst, he was commissioned ensign, by purchase, in the 4th (King's Own) Regiment on 10 November 1829 and reached Sydney in the Asia on 2 December 1831. He was promoted lieutenant on 1 July 1833 and, from 1 October next year, he commanded the first division of the Mounted Police at Bathurst.

== Career ==
In 1835 with a party of troopers Zouch established that the botanist Richard Cunningham had been murdered by Aboriginals. He was appointed a magistrate on 7 October 1835; at Holy Trinity Church, Kelso near Bathurst, on 29 December 1836 he married Maria (d.1885), youngest daughter of Captain Richard Brooks. He was involved in business dealings with his friend Captain John Piper, who had lent his home, Alloway Bank, for Zouch's wedding reception. In 1837 his regiment was posted to India and he sold his commission and retired from the police. Next year he bought land on the Bell River near Wellington but lived at his wife's house, Ashby, at Bungendore near Lake George in the 1840s. A great horseman, he reputedly spent much of his time breeding and racing horses.

== Gold rush involvements ==
In 1851-53? Zouch was assistant commissioner of crown lands for the gold districts, based on the Lower Turon. His prudent administration of the hated Goldfields Management Act contributed much towards the public peace. He returned to Goulburn in 1853 when appointed superintendent of police, Mounted Patrol, southern districts, including the Gundagai and Braidwood gold escorts. He coped fearlessly with the anti-Chinese riots at Lambing Flat in 1860 and 1861. On 30 June, when the miners tried to storm the police quarters to release three arrested men, Zouch ordered his troopers to charge and in the mêlée one miner was killed and many injured. That night he ordered the withdrawal of the commissioners and police to Yass to avoid further bloodshed.

== Police regulation act ==
In March 1862, under the new Police Regulation Act, Zouch was appointed superintendent of police for the south-eastern district at a salary of £500. In the next three years bushrangers, especially Ben Hall's gang, were active in his region; but, through his discretion, courage and horsemanship, Zouch won praise in parliament, at a time when the police were proving generally ineffective. Gentlemanly and quiet in manner, he was one of the most efficient officers in the public service. He was an early member of the Australian Club, founding president of the Goulburn Rifle Club in 1865 and a member of the local Public School Board

== Death ==
Zouch died of sunstroke on 28 October 1883 at Goulburn, where he was buried with Anglican rites. He was survived by his wife, four sons and three daughters. His eldest son Henry married Adelaide, sister of Major-General Sir William Throsby Bridges, his daughter Marcia married Nicholas Herbert Throsby and his son Richard Essington married Mary Emily Throsby. His personalty was valued for probate at £4057. Zouch Street in Young (formerly Lambing Flat), New South Wales, and Zouch St in Wellington, NSW, are both named after him.

== See also ==
- Richard Cunningham (botanist)
- John Piper (military officer)
- Ben Hall (bushranger)
- William Bridges (general)
