= Ancient and modern arms =

Heraldry terminology

Ancient and modern are terms used in heraldry to differentiate two different coats of arms used at different periods by a family or other bearer. Reasons for changing arms have been numerous, the most famous being the 1376 change in the French royal arms by Charles V of France to show three fleurs-de-lis instead of semee de lis, possibly to symbolize the Holy Trinity. The reasons for other changes were more prosaic, for example where a court of chivalry ordered a change or differencing where two families claimed the same arms, as in the famous case of Scrope v Grosvenor. The resulting two versions of arms are referred to as "France ancient" and "France modern", "Grosvenor ancient" and "Grosvenor modern".

== List of examples ==
Family	Ancient arms	Modern arms	Date of change	Notes
Capet (Royal arms of France)	Arms of France ancient: Azure semée-de-lis or	Arms of France modern: Azure, three fleurs-de-lis or	1376	See article Royal Arms of France
Portugal (Royal arms of Portugal)	Portugal ancient: Argent, five escutcheons crosswise the dexter and sinister ones pointing to the center azure each semée of argent plates	Portugal modern: Argent, five escutcheons in cross azure each charged with as many argent plates in saltire, all within bordure gules semée of seven castles or	1245 (first version of Portugal modern)/1485 (current version)	See article Coat of arms of Portugal
Denmark (Coat of arms of Denmark)	Denmark ancient: Or semée of waterlily pads gules, three leopards passant azure crowned or langued gules.	Denmark modern: Or, three lions passant in pale azure crowned or langued gules, nine lily pads gules.	1819	Originally the lions were heraldic leopards facing the viewer and the number of hearts (officially blazoned as waterlily pads) was not defined and could be much larger than today. The lions were defined as heraldic lions and the number of hearts specified to nine in 1819.
Grosvenor	Grosvenor ancient: Azure, a Bend Or	Grosvenor modern: Azure, a Garb Or	1389	See article Scrope v Grosvenor
Gorges	Gorges ancient: Lozengy or and azure	Gorges modern: Lozengy or and azure, a chevron gules	1347	See article Warbelton v Gorges
Percy	Percy ancient: Azure, five fusils conjoined in fess or	Percy modern: Or, a lion rampant azure	1273-1314	See article Henry de Percy, 1st Baron Percy
Talbot	Talbot ancient: Bendy of ten argent and gules	Talbot modern: Gules, a lion rampant within a bordure engrailed or		See article Baron Talbot. Modern arms are of Rhys Mechyll (d.1244), Prince of the Welsh House of Dinefwr, grandson of Rhys ap Gruffydd), whose daughter Gwenllian was the wife of Gilbert Talbot (d.1274), grandfather of Gilbert Talbot, 1st Baron Talbot (d.1345/6)
Cantilupe	Cantilupe ancient: Gules, three fleurs-de-lis or	Cantilupe modern: Gules, three leopard's faces jessant-de-lys reversed or	1275-1282	See article Thomas de Cantilupe
Killigrew	Killigrew ancient: Gules, three mascles or	Killigrew modern: Argent, an eagle displayed with two heads sable a bordure of the second bezantée		See article Arwenack
Scudamore				
Crewe	Crewe ancient: Gules semée of quatrefoils and fretty or	Crewe modern: Azure, a lion rampant argent	bef. 1303	Sir Thomas de Crewe, Lord of Crewe used a seal depicting fretwork with quatrefoils filling in the spaces. His son Patrick would begin using a lion rampant, which became the modern arms of Crewe. See the 17th century portrait of Sir Ranulphe Crewe by Peter Lely for a quartered depiction of both arms.

== See also ==
- List of oldest heraldry
