= Jessant-de-lys =

Heraldic term

A leopard's face jessant-de-lys

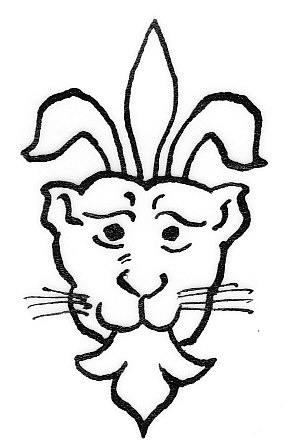
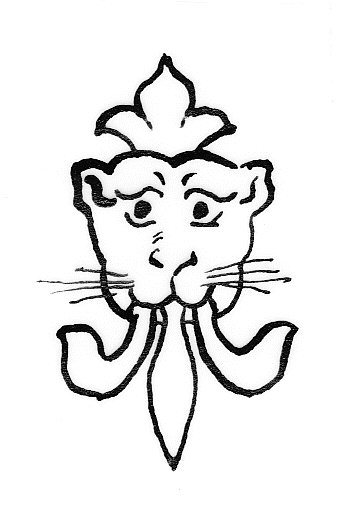
A leopard's face jessant-de-lys, left: shown in the standard form with fleur-de-lys erect, right: shown in the unusual form with the fleur-de-lys reversed

Jessant-de-lys is a heraldic term denoting a fleur-de-lys issuing out of any object. It is most frequently seen in conjunction with a leopard's face, meaning in heraldic language the face of a lion.

== Description ==
Charles Boutell (1863) described the charge thus: "A leopard's face affrontée, resting upon a fleur-de-lys, and having the lower part of the flower issuing from the animal's mouth". This appears to describe a fleur-de-lys erect. The fleur-de-lys is on occasion shown reversed, perhaps as an heraldic difference, or simply in error. The early authority on heraldry John Guillim (d.1621) wrote in his Display of Heraldry: "A Lyon Jessant..is not subjected to the primary charge, but is borne over both the field and charge, and is therefore called a Lyon Jessant, jacendo, because of such lying all over". (i.e. French, from jacendus-a-um the gerundive of the Latin verb jaceo, to lie). Guillim may have given some thought to this charge, having married a member of the Denys family of Gloucestershire, whose arms display the charges three times.

== Origin ==
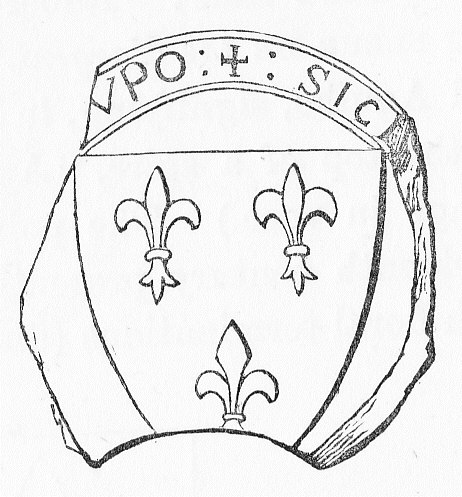
Seal of William de Cantilupe (died 1239) showing on an escutcheon three fleurs-de-lys

Seal of Bishop Thomas de Cantilupe showing arms of Cantilupe ancient on each side of the bishop.

The earliest use of a leopard's face jessant-de-lys was in the last quarter of the 13th century, by the Anglo-Norman family of Cantilupe, borne as a group of three ("Cantilupe modern"). Planché (1852) proposed the Cantilupe jessant-de-lys arms to have been differences of their earlier arms of three fleurs-de-lys, which might be referred to as "Cantilupe ancient", which were used from the start of the age of heraldry in about 1215, until 1280. Boutell however tentatively suggests them to be the result of a rare compounding of two separate coats of arms, resulting from a marriage to an heiress, akin to dimidiation. However, he gives no genealogical data to support such marriage having occurred.

Evidence of the use of "Cantilupe ancient" last appears in the Camden roll of arms, c. 1280. for Johan de Cauntelo They are earlier listed as Gules, three fleurs de lys or for Sir George de Cantilupe (died 1273) in the Charles's Roll, St. George's Roll, and in the Camden Roll. The arms of William de Cantilupe (died 1254) are listed even earlier in the Glover's Roll as: Gules, three fleurs-de-lys or. The earliest record of the arms of "Cantilupe ancient" is in the seal of William de Cantilupe (died 1239). The antiquarian John Nichols (d.1826) in his History and Antiquities of the County of Leicester records a deed dated 1215 relating to the first William de Cantilupe's manor of Brentingby, Leicestershire, on which the seal is three fleurs-de-lys circumscribed.

== Earliest use ==
Arms of St Thomas Cantilupe (died 1282), Bishop of Hereford: Gules, three leopard's faces reversed jessant-de-lys or

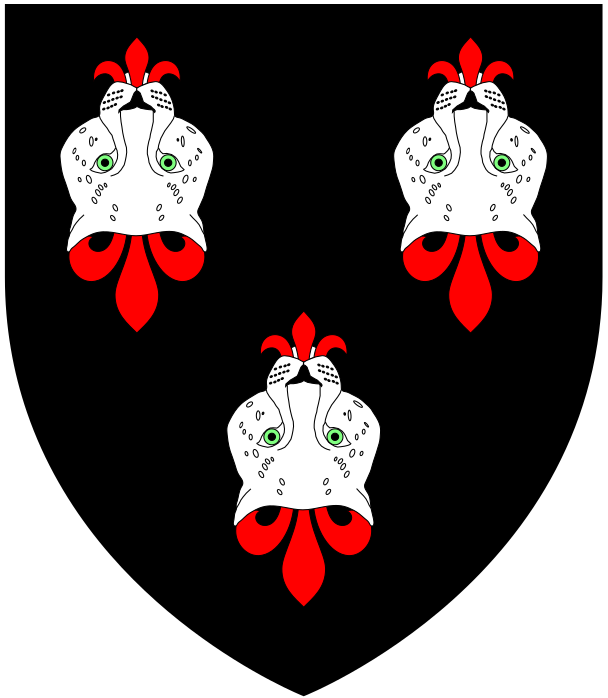
Arms of Woodforde: Sable, three leopard's faces reversed argent jessant-de-lys gules, known to have been feudal tenants of a Cantilupe at Brentingby, Leicestershire

St Thomas Cantilupe (died 1282), Bishop of Hereford, granted his personal arms, the Cantilupe arms reversed (i.e. upside down) for difference to the see of Hereford, and the arms are still used by the Bishop of Hereford today. The episcopal seal of St Thomas still shows however the arms of "Cantilupe ancient" in the form of two groups of three fleurs-de-lys either side of a figure of the standing bishop. This suggests that the ancient arms were still in use at the start of his episcopal reign in 1275, when the seal would have been made.

The modern arms were certainly in use in 1300, but by a cadet branch of the Cantilupe family (which had died out in the main line in 1273 on the death of Sir George de Cantilupe) in the form of another William de Cantilupe, who used a fess for difference, as recorded in the Caerlaverock Roll, which was a record of participants at the siege of Caerlaverock Castle in 1300. His arms are recorded as Gules, a fess vair between 3 leopard's faces jessant-de-lys or.

The Cantilupe family granted their arms, with differences, to many of their feudal tenants, as arms of patronage, which have taken the form of "Cantilupe modern". Examples are in the 13th century to Hubard of Ipsley, Warwickshire, to John Woodforde of Brentingby (fl. 1316), Leicestershire and possibly to Denys of Siston, Gloucestershire, formerly from Glamorgan, in connection with Candleston Castle. From the Denys family the arms were apparently borrowed by the unrelated family of Thomas Tenison (1636-1715), Archbishop of Canterbury, from whom the unrelated family of Alfred Lord Tennyson, poet laureate, again borrowed, probably as their family names signify "Dennis's son".

== Modern usage ==
The true Cantilupe modern arms are borne today only by the See of Hereford, the Earl De La Warr, whose lesser title is Viscount Cantelupe, both titles created in 1761 for the West family, distant descendants of the ancient Cantilupe family, and the Earl of Pembroke who also quarter Cantilupe. The second quarter of the De La Warr coat of arms is blazoned thus: Azure, 3 leopard's faces reversed jessant-de-lys or.

=== Jessant of other charges ===
The Canadian Heraldic Authority has also issued grants for arms and badges blazoned "jessant of" charges other than a fleur-de-lis, including jessant of a cross, jessant of a pheon, jessant of a sword, jessant of a Guernsey lily, and jessant d'érable (of a maple leaf).

== Sources ==
- Boutell, Charles (1864). Heraldry, historical and popular (3rd ed.). London: Richard Bentley.
- Planché, J.R. (1873) [1852]. The Pursuivant of Arms; or Heraldry founded upon facts. London. pp. 103–104 – via HathiTrust.
