= William de Cantilupe (died 1251) =

Anglo-Norman magnate

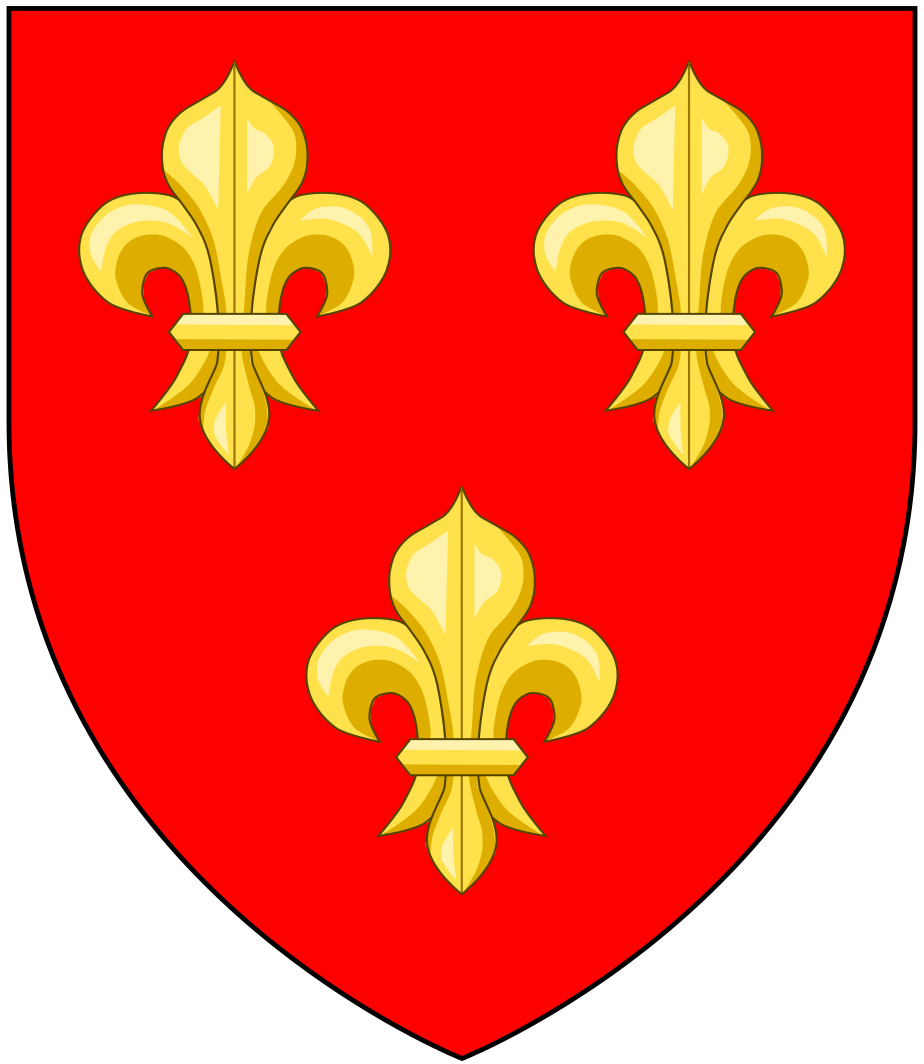
Arms of William de Cantilupe: Gules, three fleurs-de-lys or ("Cantilupe Ancient"). These arms are blazoned in Glover's roll of arms. The Cantilupe arms changed in the late 13th century to jessant-de-lys

William II de Cantilupe (died 1251) (anciently Cantelow, Cantelou, Canteloupe, etc, Latinised to de Cantilupo), 2nd feudal baron of Eaton Bray in Bedfordshire, was an Anglo-Norman magnate.

== Origins ==
He was the eldest son and heir of William I de Cantilupe (died 1239), 1st feudal baron of Eaton Bray, steward of the household to King John, a royal administrator and sheriff, by his wife Mazilia de Braci. His younger brother was Walter de Cantilupe (1195-1266), Bishop of Worcester.

== Career ==
He became a retainer of Ranulf de Blondeville, 6th Earl of Chester and served with him on King Henry III's expedition to Brittany. In 1238 he joined the royal household of King Henry III (son of King John) and was appointed Sheriff of Nottinghamshire and Derbyshire in 1239. In 1242 he was one of the three Keepers of the Realm during the king's absence campaigning in Poitou.

== Marriage and children ==
He married Millicent (or Maud) de Gournai (d.1260), a daughter of Hugh de Gournai and widow of Amaury VI of Montfort-Évreux (d. 1213), Earl of Gloucester. By his marriage he gained six and a half fees in Oxfordshire. Millicent survived him and in 1255 was awarded the custody of Princess Margaret, later Queen of Scots, daughter of King Henry III. By Millicent he had issue including:

- William III de Cantilupe (d.1254), eldest son and heir;
- Hugh de Cantilupe (d.1285), Archdeacon of Gloucester, 2nd son; one of the executors of the will of his uncle Bishop Walter de Cantilupe.
- Thomas de Cantilupe (1220-1282), Bishop of Hereford and Chancellor of England, canonised in 1320 as a saint.
- Sir Nicholas de Cantilupe (d.1266), of Greasley Castle in Nottinghamshire, who married Eustachia FitzHugh, heiress of Greasley. His son was William de Cantilupe, 1st Baron Cantilupe (1262-1308) of Greasley, summoned by writ to Parliament in 1299.
- Juliana de Cantilupe, who at some time before 1245 married Robert de Tregoz (d.1268) of Ewyas Harold in Herefordshire, by whom she was the mother of John de Tregoz, 1st Baron Tregoz, summoned by writ to Parliament in 1297.
- Agnes de Cantilupe (d.post-1279), who married Robert St John (d.1266/7), grandparents of John St John, 1st Baron St John (d. 1329) of Basing. Agnes survived her first husband, and before 1271 remarried to John de Turville.
- 3rd daughter, name unknown, who married Robert de Gregonet.

== Death and succession ==
He died in 1251 and was succeeded by his eldest son William III de Cantilupe (died 1254).
