= Bréhal =

- Commune
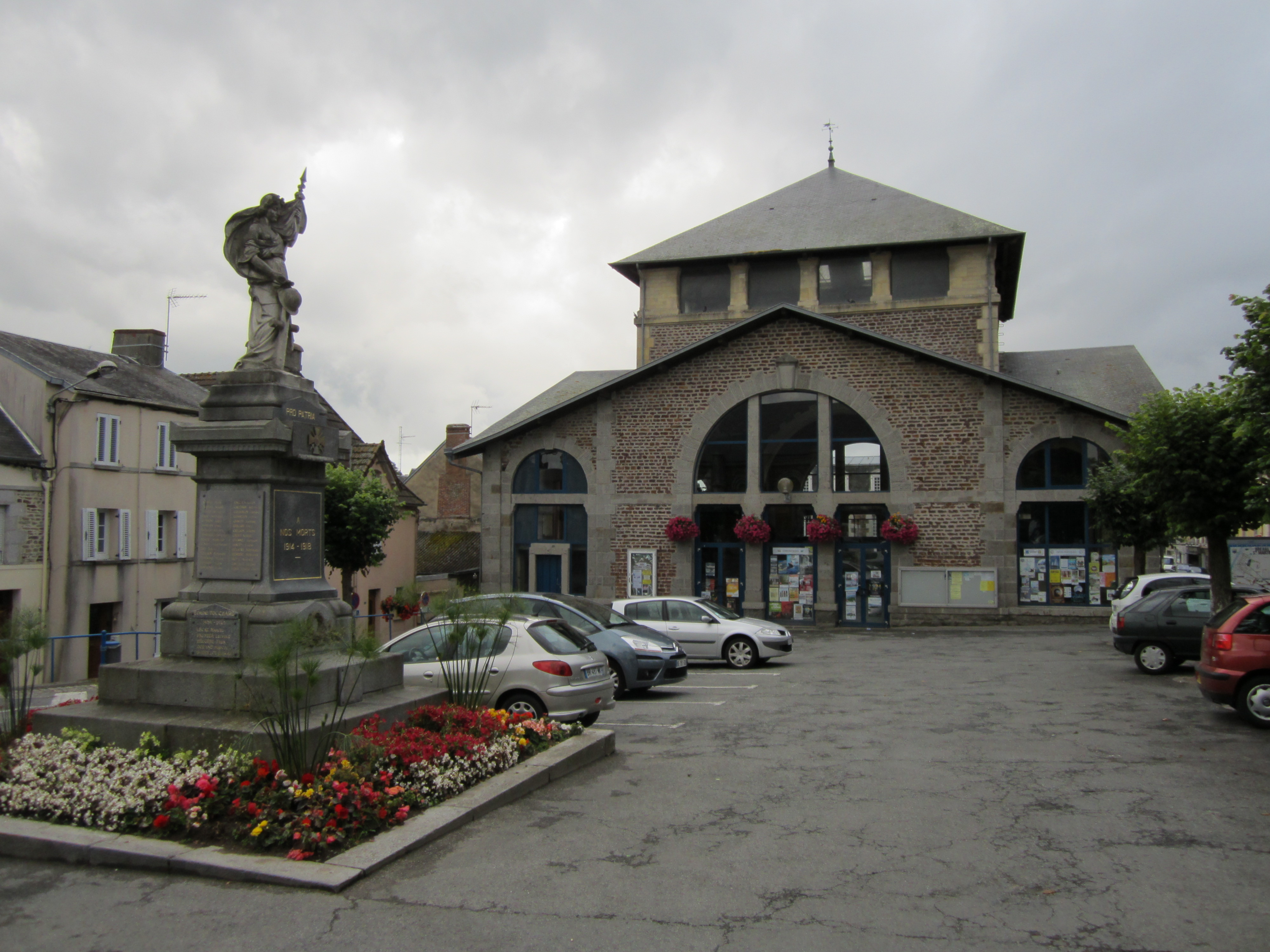
- The old town hall

- Coat of arms
- Location of Bréhal
- Location within France Location within Normandy
- Coordinates: 48°53′57″N 1°30′38″W
- Country: France
- Region: Normandy
- Department: Manche
- Arrondissement: Avranches
- Canton: Bréhal

Government
  - Mayor (2020–2026): Daniel Lécureuil
- Area^{1}: 12.71 km^{2} (4.91 sq mi)
- Elevation: 69 m (226 ft)
- Highest elevation: 71 m (233 ft)
- Lowest elevation: 4 m (13 ft)
- Population (2023): 3,487
  - Density: 274.4/km^{2} (710.6/sq mi)
- Time zone: UTC+01:00 (CET)
  - Summer (DST): UTC+02:00 (CEST)
- INSEE/Postal code: 50076 /50290
- ^{1} French Land Register data, which excludes lakes, ponds, glaciers > 1 km^{2} (0.386 sq mi or 247 acres) and river estuaries.

Bréhal (French pronunciation: [bʁe.al]) is a commune in the Manche department in Normandy in northwestern France.

== Population ==
Historical population

Year	Pop.	±% p.a.
1793	1,159	—
1821	1,519	+0.97%
1846	1,577	+0.15%
1872	1,439	−0.35%
1901	1,299	−0.35%
1926	1,252	−0.15%
1946	1,420	+0.63%
1962	1,525	+0.45%
1968	1,568	+0.46%

Year	Pop.	±% p.a.
1975	1,988	+3.45%
1982	2,390	+2.67%
1990	2,351	−0.21%
1999	2,599	+1.12%
2007	2,971	+1.69%
2012	3,070	+0.66%
2017	3,410	+2.12%
2023	3,487	+0.37%

Source: EHESS and INSEE (1968-2023)

== International relations ==
Bréhal is twinned with Lydney in Gloucestershire.

== Heraldry ==
Arms of Bréhal	The arms of Bréhal are blazoned : Per fess 1: Gules, a leopard between 8 fleurs de lys (4 above, 4 below); 2 Azure, 3 escallops Or.

== See also ==
- Communes of the Manche department
