= Chanteloup, Manche =

Chanteloup
- Commune
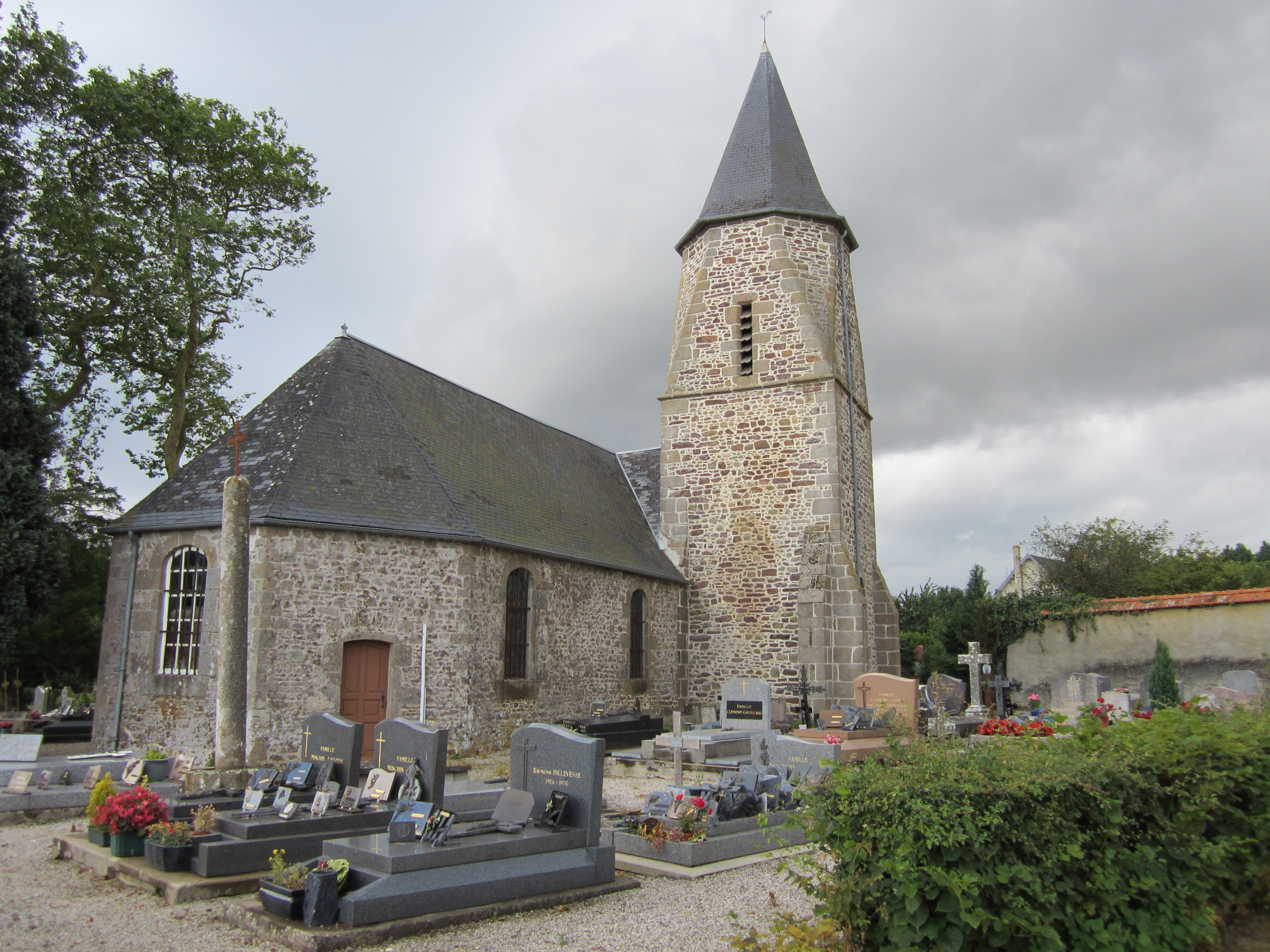
- The church of Saint-Pierre
- Location of Chanteloup
- Location within France Location within Normandy
- Coordinates: 48°54′00″N 1°29′09″W
- Country: France
- Region: Normandy
- Department: Manche
- Arrondissement: Avranches
- Canton: Bréhal
- Intercommunality: Granville, Terre et Mer

Government
  - Mayor (2020–2026): Denis Lebouteiller
- Area^{1}: 4.17 km^{2} (1.61 sq mi)
- Elevation: 50 m (160 ft)
- Highest elevation: 72 m (236 ft)
- Lowest elevation: 24 m (79 ft)
- Population (2023): 407
  - Density: 97.6/km^{2} (253/sq mi)
- Time zone: UTC+01:00 (CET)
  - Summer (DST): UTC+02:00 (CEST)
- INSEE/Postal code: 50120 /50510
- ^{1} French Land Register data, which excludes lakes, ponds, glaciers > 1 km^{2} (0.386 sq mi or 247 acres) and river estuaries.

Chanteloup (French pronunciation: [ʃɑ̃tlu]) is a commune in the Manche department in Normandy in north-western France.

== Places and monuments ==
Church Saint-Pierre de Chanteloup which depends on the parish of Our Lady of Hope on the deanery of Country-Villedieu Granville.

== See also ==
- Communes of the Manche department
