= Walter de Cantilupe =

13th-century English bishop

- Bishop of Worcester
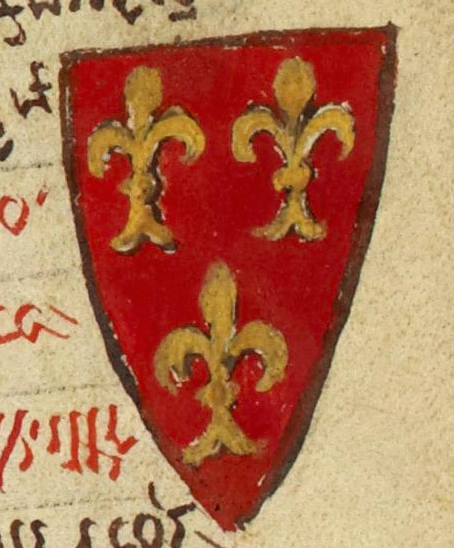
- Elected: 30 August 1236
- Term ended: 12 February 1266
- Predecessor: William de Blois
- Successor: Nicholas of Ely

Orders
- Ordination: 18 April 1237
- Consecration: 3 May 1237

Personal details
- Born: 1195
- Died: 12 February 1266 (aged 70–71)
- Denomination: Catholic

Walter de Cantilupe (Note: Also Cantelow, Cantelou, or Canteloupe; Latinised to de Cantilupo) (died 1266) was an English clergyman who was Bishop of Worcester from 1236 to 1266.

== Early life and career ==
Cantilupe came from a family that had risen by devoted service to the crown. His father, William I de Cantilupe, and his elder brother William II de Cantilupe were named by Roger of Wendover among the evil counsellors of King John of England, apparently for no better reason than that they were consistently loyal to an unpopular master.

Cantilupe at first followed in his father's footsteps, entering the service of the Exchequer and acting as an itinerant Justice in the early years of Henry III.

But Cantilupe also took minor holy orders, and, in 1236, although not yet a deacon, received the see of Worcester. He was elected on 30 August 1236 and was consecrated on 3 May 1237. He was ordained a deacon on 4 April 1237 and a priest on 18 April 1237.

== Bishop ==
As bishop, Cantilupe identified himself with the party of ecclesiastical reform, which was then led by Edmund Rich and Robert Grosseteste. Like his leaders he was sorely divided between his theoretical belief in the papacy as a divine institution and his instinctive condemnation of the policy which Pope Gregory IX and Pope Innocent IV pursued in their dealings with the English church. At first a court favorite, Cantilupe came at length to the belief that the evils of the time arose from the unprincipled alliance of crown and papacy.

In 1240 Cantilupe conducted the significant Synod of Worcester, advancing many reforms for the church.

Cantilupe raised his voice against papal demands for money, and after the death of Grosseteste in 1253 was the chief spokesman of the nationalist clergy. At the parliament of Oxford in 1258 he was elected by the popular party as one of their representatives on the committee of twenty-four which undertook to reform the administration; from that time until the outbreak of civil war he was a man of mark in the councils of the baronial party. During the war he sided with Simon de Montfort, 6th Earl of Leicester and, through his nephew, Thomas de Cantilupe, who was then Chancellor of Oxford University, brought over the university to the popular side.

Cantilupe was present at the Battle of Lewes and blessed the Montfortians before they joined battle with the army of the king; he entertained de Montfort on the night before the final rout and defeat of the Battle of Evesham. During Montfort's rule Cantilupe appeared only as a mediating influence; in the triumvirate of electors who controlled the administration, the clergy were represented by the Bishop of Chichester.

== Death and legacy ==
Cantilupe died on 12 February 1266. He was respected by all parties, and, though far inferior in versatility and force of will to Grosseteste, fully merits the admiration which his moral character inspired. He is one of the few constitutionalists of his day whom it is impossible to accuse of interested motives.

== Citations ==
Catholic Church titles
| Preceded by William de Blois | Bishop of Worcester; 1236–1265 | Succeeded by Nicholas of Ely |
