= Thomas de Cantilupe =

13th-century Bishop of Hereford and saint

Saint Thomas de Cantilupe
- Bishop of Hereford
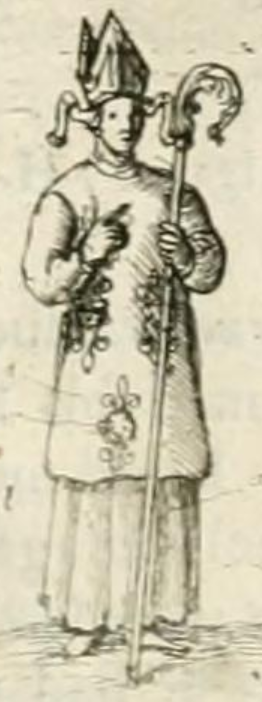
- Thomas de Cantilupe depicted in a now lost stained glass window in the Church of St James the Great, Snitterfield, Warwickshire. (Note: This was a manor held by the Cantilupe family until 1323; 1656 drawing by William Dugdale. On his tunic he displays his differenced arms of Cantilupe – gules, three fleur-de-lis issuant from a leopard's head or. Later, on his canonization, the see of Hereford adopted yet would further difference his arms, inverting the leopard's head.)
- Installed: 1275
- Term ended: 1282
- Predecessor: John de Breton
- Successor: Richard Swinefield

Orders
- Consecration: 8 September 1275 by Robert Kilwardby, with co-consecrators being John Chishull and Walter de Merton

Personal details
- Born: c. 1218 Hambleden, Buckinghamshire, England
- Died: 25 August 1282 (aged 63–64) Ferento, Montefiascone, Papal States
- Buried: Hereford Cathedral
- Denomination: Roman Catholicism

Sainthood
- Feast day: 25 August 2 October
- Venerated in: Roman Catholic Church, Anglican Communion
- Title as Saint: Bishop
- Canonized: 17 April 1320 by Pope John XXII
- Attributes: mitre, holding a crosier
- Shrines: Hereford Cathedral; Downside Abbey

Lord Chancellor
- In office 1264–1265
- Monarch: Henry III of England
- Preceded by: John Chishull
- Succeeded by: Ralph Sandwich

"Modern" arms assumed by the See of Hereford: Gules, three leopard's faces reversed jessant-de-lys or. These arms were differenced from the arms of Thomas de Cantilupe following his canonization.

Thomas de Cantilupe (c. 1218 – 25 August 1282; also spelled Cantelow, Cantelou, Canteloupe, Latinised to de Cantilupo) (Note: The commonly accepted modern spelling is "Cantilupe", as used by the Oxford Dictionary of National Biography for all members of this family, and which is followed in this article.) was Lord Chancellor of England and Bishop of Hereford. He was canonised in 1320 by Pope John XXII. He has been noted as "an inveterate enemy of the Jews", and his demands that they be expelled from England were cited in the evidence presented for his canonization.

== Origins ==
Thomas was the third son of William II de Cantilupe (died 1251) (anciently Cantelow, Cantelou, Canteloupe, etc, Latinised to de Cantilupo), 2nd feudal baron of Eaton Bray in Bedfordshire, who was steward of the household to King Henry III (as his father William I de Cantilupe (died 1239) had been to Henry's father King John). Thomas's mother was Millicent (or Maud) de Gournai (died 1260), a daughter of Hugh de Gournai and widow of Amaury VI of Montfort-Évreux (died 1213), Earl of Gloucester. He was born at Hambleden in Buckinghamshire, a manor belonging to his mother's first husband but awarded to her during her lifetime as her dowry. Thomas's uncle was Walter de Cantilupe (died 1266), Bishop of Worcester.

== Career ==
Cantilupe was educated at Oxford, Paris and Orléans, and was a teacher of canon law at the University of Oxford, where he became Chancellor in 1261.

During the Second Barons' War, Cantilupe favoured Simon de Montfort and the baronial party. He represented the barons before King Louis IX of France at Amiens in 1264.

On 25 February 1264, when he was Archdeacon of Stafford, Cantilupe was made Lord Chancellor of England, but was deprived of the office after de Montfort's death at the Battle of Evesham, and lived abroad for a while. Following his return to England, he was again appointed Chancellor of Oxford University, where he lectured on theology and held several ecclesiastical appointments.

== Bishop of Hereford ==
Mandorla-shaped seal of Bishop Thomas de Cantilupe. Legend: Tomas Dei Gratia Herefordensis Ep(iscopu)s ('Thomas by the grace of God Bishop of Hereford'). The arms of Cantilupe ancient are displayed on each side of the bishop: three fleurs-de-lys. Hereford Cathedral Archives 6460. He stands on a wolf (Latin: lupus), a canting charge seen on pre-heraldic seals of the Cantilupe family

In 1274, Cantilupe attended the Second Council of Lyons and on 14 June 1275, he was appointed Bishop of Hereford, being consecrated on 8 September 1275.

Cantilupe was now a trusted adviser of King Edward I and when attending royal councils at Windsor Castle or at Westminster he lived at Earley in Berkshire. Even when differing from the king's opinions, he did not forfeit his favour.

Cantilupe asked special permission from Edward I to preach to the Jews of Hereford to convert them. Later, during the coin clipping crisis, where large numbers of Jews were targeted and accused of tampering with the currency, Cantilupe objected to the use of a converted Jew to investigate the charges. He then demanded that any unconverted Jews should be expelled from the Kingdom as “enemies of God and rebels against the faith” (inimici Dei et rebelles fidei), threatened to resign and broke down in tears. The King was reported to have capitulated to his demands.

Cantilupe had a "great conflict" in 1279 with the "Red Earl", Gilbert de Clare, 7th Earl of Gloucester, 6th Earl of Hertford, concerning hunting rights in Malvern, Worcestershire, and a ditch dug by de Clare. The issue was settled by costly litigation.

After the death in 1279 of Robert Kilwardby, Archbishop of Canterbury, a friend of Cantilupe's, and formerly his confessor, a series of disputes arose between him and John Peckham, the new archbishop. The disagreements culminated in Peckham excommunicating Cantilupe, who proceeded to Rome to pursue the matter with the pope.

== Death, burial, and canonization ==
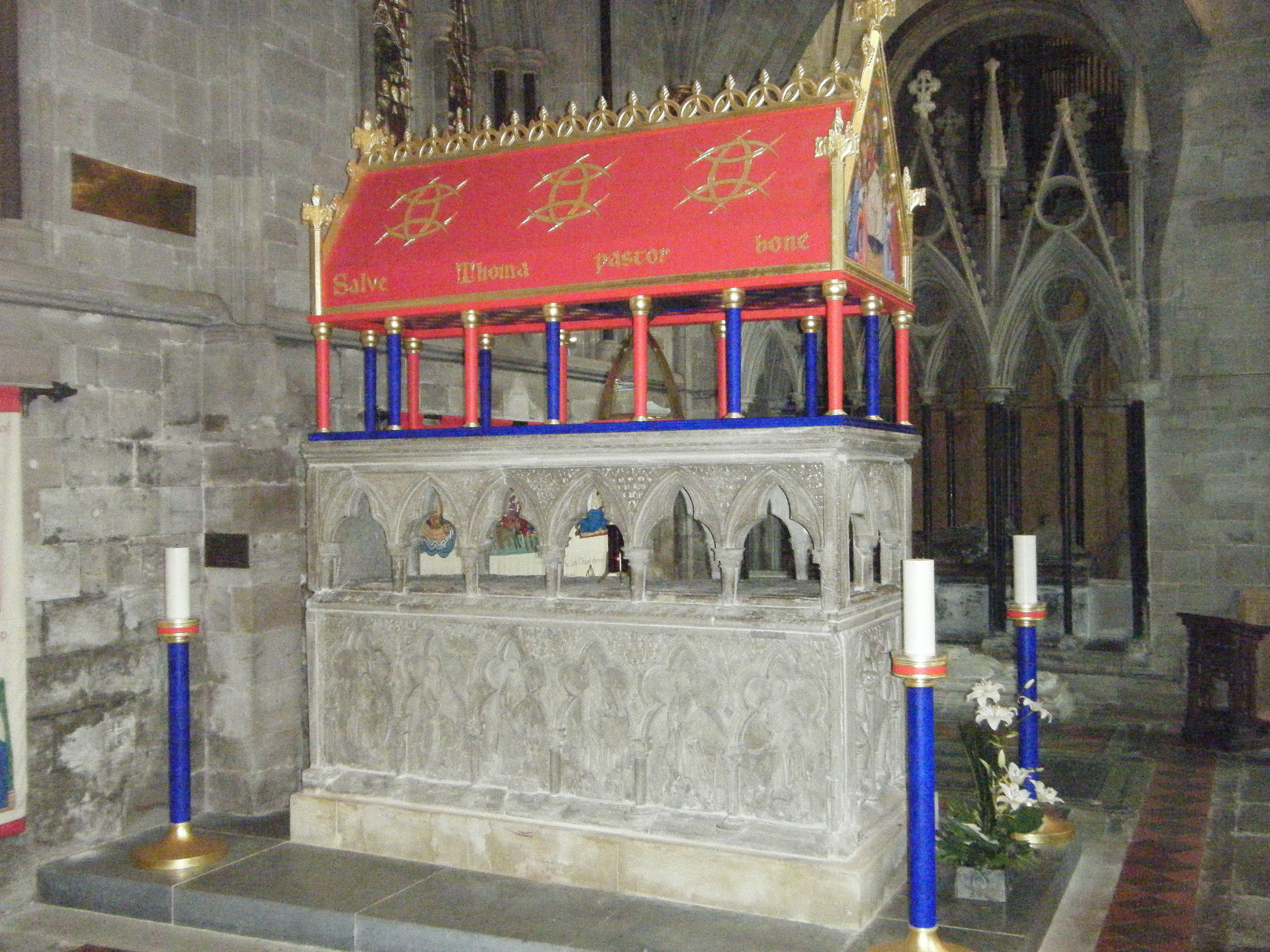
The restored tomb of Thomas de Cantilupe in Hereford Cathedral

Cantilupe died at Ferento, near Orvieto, in Italy, on 25 August 1282, on his way to Rome. He is buried in Hereford Cathedral. His cult was swiftly established at Hereford, and his canonization was promoted by his protege, the next Bishop, Richard Swinefield. Miracles were recorded by 1283; however Cantilupe's dispute with Peckham continued to haunt him after his death, as Peckham was outraged that Cantilupe was being put forward as a saint, as Cantilupe was still excommunicated in his view, which would preclude him for consideration.

Supporters of his cult included Edward I, who attended the ceremony to translate Cantilupe's body to its new position in 1287, seen as a step towards confirmation of his sainthood. Edward I is recorded as saying that he was keen "to have as a sympathetic patron in heaven him whom we had in our household on earth".

=== Evidence for his canonization ===
Among the evidence gathered and submitted to the Pope was evidence of his hostility to Jews, particularly his insistence to Edward I that those that did not convert should be expelled from England.

One of the many miracles cited in his cause of canonization was the supposed raising from the dead of William Cragh, a Welsh rebel who was hanged in 1290, eight years after Cantilupe's death.

A papal inquiry was convened in London on 20 April 1307 to determine whether or not Cantilupe had died excommunicate, since this would have precluded his being canonized. Forty-four witnesses were called and various letters produced, before the commissioners of the inquiry concluded that Cantilupe had been absolved in Rome before his death. It was difficult for his cause of death to be determined as much of his body had disintegrated.

After a papal investigation lasting almost 13 years, Cantilupe was canonized by Pope John XXII on 17 April 1320. His feast day was fixed on 2 October.

=== Cult and shrine ===
His shrine became a popular place of pilgrimage, but only its base survived the Reformation until a new upper section (a feretory) was recreated in 2008 under the guidance of Nicholas Quayle. The new section is in vivid colours with a painted scene of the Virgin and Child holding the Mappa Mundi. A reliquary containing his skull has been held at Downside Abbey in Somerset since 1881.

It is generally believed that the Hereford Mappa Mundi was created to be used as part of his cult. A number of references on the map itself, such as a hunting scene, may refer to him directly. The belief system on the map includes a number of derogatory or anti-Semitic images that identify the Exodus and devil worship with contemporaneous Jewry, which may echo the beliefs of Cantilupe himself. Architectural features of the Cathedral, which are also thought to relate to the cult, echo similar anti-Jewish themes, in particular Synagoga, a blindfolded Jew with a broken staff, dropping twin tablets of God's law.

Records of his cult and financial receipts for it still exist and have formed the basis of several studies. These provide one of the few extensive records of a pre-Reformation cult in England. Objects venerating Cantilupe have been found across a wide area, suggesting that his cult may have been more extensive than has previously been assumed.

=== Current Catholic veneration ===
In the current Latin edition of the Roman Martyrology (2004 edition), Cantilupe is listed under 25 August as follows: "At Montefiascone in Tuscia, the passing of Saint Thomas Cantelupe, Bishop of Hereford in England, who, resplendent with learning, severe toward himself, to the poor however showed himself a generous benefactor".

== Legacy ==
Cantilupe is still regarded by many as an exemplary bishop in both spiritual and secular affairs. These depend on the reports made at the time of his canonisation, which were unusually extensive. In these, it is said that his charities were large and his private life blameless. He is presented as constantly visiting his diocese, correcting offenders and discharging other episcopal duties. These also present his efforts on behalf of the diocese, and it is clear from other documentary evidence that he took action on behalf of his diocese, such as compelling neighbouring landholders to restore estates which he contended belonged to the see of Hereford.

The records associated with his canonisation have been the subject of academic investigation, leading to some reassessment, for instance looking at the process by which miracles were sought and attributed, to better comprehend how such reports were generated and understood at the time. Others have sought to use them to understand the medical conditions associated with reports of miraculous recoveries.

His anti-Semitism and misogyny depicted in the depositions have been highlighted by some scholars. These emphasise his direct appeals for the expulsion of the Jews, and his refusal to socialise with women, believing this to be extreme even for his time; this includes reinterpretation of objects associated with his cult, such as the Mappa Mundi.

His veneration in the Catholic church and Church of England continues. Cantilupe has been lauded as the "Father of Modern Charity", and is cited as an inspiration by Mother Teresa and Melinda Gates. Books celebrating his life have been published by the Bishopric in recent years, and personal pilgrimage to his shrine is encouraged.

=== In culture and society ===
The Cantilupe Society was a text publication society founded in 1905 to publish the episcopal registers of the See of Hereford, of which Cantilupe's is the earliest to survive, and other records relating to the cathedral and diocese. It fell into abeyance after 1932.

Cantilupe is referred to in Graham Greene's novel Travels With My Aunt (1969), when the narrator's sharp-tongued aunt opines "I would have thought he was very lucky to die in Orvieto rather than in Hereford. A small civilized place even today with a far, far better climate and an excellent restaurant in the Via Garibaldi."

Cantilupe is used as an historical figure central to the plot in the television series Midwinter of the Spirit (2015) although the story is fictional.

== Citations ==
Political offices
Preceded by John Chishull	Lord Chancellor; 1264–1265	Succeeded by Ralph Sandwich (Keeper of the Great Seal)
Catholic Church titles
Preceded by John de Breton	Bishop of Hereford; 1275–1282	Succeeded by Richard Swinefield
Academic offices
Preceded by Richard de S. Agatha	Chancellor of the University of Oxford; 1262–1264	Succeeded by Henry de Cicestre? or Nicholas de Ewelme
