= Baron Zouche =

Title that has been created three times in the Peerage of England

Barony of Zouche
- Arms of Alan la Zouche, 1st Baron la Zouche of Ashby (1267–1314) as shown on his seal affixed to the Barons' Letter of 1301: Gules, ten bezants 4, 3, 2, 1.
- Creation date: 16 August 1308 (Baron Zouche of Haryngworth)
- Created by: Edward II
- Peerage: Peerage of England
- First holder: William la Zouche, 1st Baron Zouche
- Present holder: William Frankland, 19th Baron Zouche
- Heir apparent: Thomas Frankland
- Remainder to: Heirs of the body

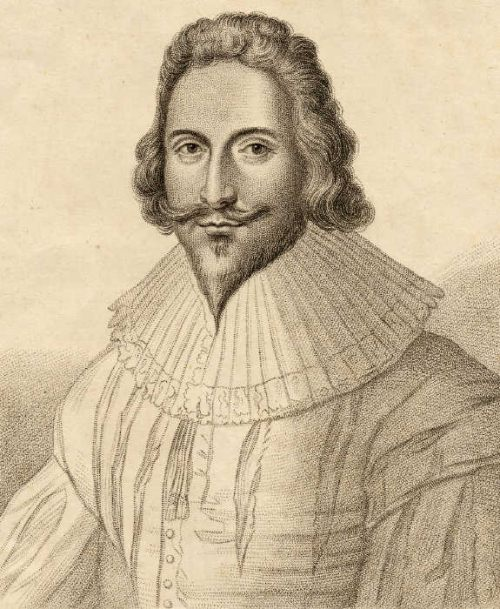
Edward la Zouche, 11th Baron Zouche

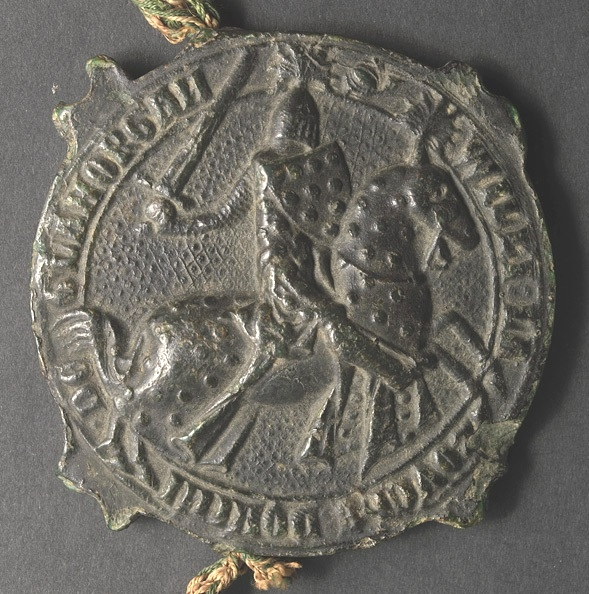
1329 seal of William la Zouche, 1st Baron Zouche of Mortimer (d. 1337), jure uxoris Lord of Glamorgan, husband of Eleanor de Clare (1292–1337), daughter and eventual heiress of Gilbert de Clare, 6th Earl of Hertford, 7th Earl of Gloucester, Lord of Glamorgan and feudal baron of Gloucester. Inscribed: S(igillum) Will(elm)i La Zouche Domini De Glamorgan ("Seal of William la Zouche, Lord of Glamorgan"). His shield and the caparison of his horse show the Zouche arms gules bezantée.

Baron Zouche is a title which has been created three times, all in the Peerage of England.

== Genealogy ==
The la Zouche family descended from Alan la Zouche (d. 1190), lord of the manor of North Molton in North Devon, England, originally called Alain de Porhoët, or Ceoche, who was a Breton nobleman who settled in England during the reign of King Henry II (1154–1189). He was the son of Viscount Geoffrey de Porhoët and Hawise (of unknown origins).

Alan married Adeline (or Alice) de Belmeis, daughter of Phillip de Belmeis and Maud la Meschine, who died at North Molton in 1190. By his marriage he obtained the manor of Ashby in Leicestershire (called after him Ashby-de-la-Zouch). His son was Roger la Zouche (c. 1175 – bef. 14 May 1238) who was the father of Alan la Zouche (1205–1270) and Eudo (or Odo) la Zouche.

=== Alan la Zouche and the Barony of Ashby ===
Alan (1205–1270) was justice of Chester and justice of Ireland under King Henry III (1216–1272). He was loyal to the king during his struggle with the barons, fought at the Battle of Lewes and helped to arrange the Peace of Kenilworth. As the result of a quarrel over some lands with John de Warenne, 6th Earl of Surrey, he was seriously injured in Westminster Hall by the earl and his retainers and died on 10 August 1270. Alan's grandson from the marriage of his son Roger to Ela Longespée, namely Alan la Zouche, was summoned by writ to Parliament on 6 February 1299 as Baron la Zouche of Ashby. He was Governor of Rockingham Castle and Steward of Rockingham Forest. However, this barony fell into abeyance on his death in 1314 without male progeny.

=== Eudo la Zouche and the Barony of Haryngworth ===
Eudo was a professional soldier; late in life, he married Millicent de Cantilupe (d. 1299), one of the two sisters and co-heiresses of Sir George de Cantilupe (1251–1273), 4th feudal baron of Eaton Bray and Lord of Abergavenny, from whom he inherited several manors including Eaton Bray, Calne and Harringworth and by whom he had three daughters and two sons. Their elder son William la Zouche was summoned by writ to Parliament as Baron Zouche of Haryngworth, on 16 August 1308. His great-great-great-grandson, the fifth Baron, married Alice Seymour, 6th Baroness St Maur, and assumed that peerage in her right. Their son succeeded to both titles; his stepmother, Elizabeth St. John, was an aunt of the future King Henry VII, a connection which proved useful to later members of the family. The seventh Baron was attainted in 1485 for loyalty to King Richard III but was eventually restored to his title and a part of his lands. On the death in 1625 of Edward la Zouche, 11th Baron Zouche, 12th Baron St Maur, the peerages fell into abeyance between Edward's two daughters, Elizabeth and Mary.

==== Revival of the Barony of Zouche of Haryngworth ====
In 1815 the Barony of Zouche was called out of abeyance in favour of Cecil Bishopp, 8th Baronet (d. 1828), of Parham Park, who became the 12th Baron Zouche. Through his mother Susanna Hedges he was a descendant of Elizabeth la Zouche.

Cecil's eldest son Lieutenant-Colonel Cecil Bisshopp (d. 1813) pre-deceased his father at age 30 in Ontario, Canada, from wounds received in action against the Americans in the War of 1812. With the deaths of both this Cecil and another son, Lieutenant Charles-Cecil Bisshopp, the Barony of Zouche once again fell into abeyance in 1828.

In 1829, the abeyance was terminated in favour of the 12th baron Cecil's elder daughter, Harriet-Anne Curzon (née Bisshopp), who became the 13th Baroness. She was the wife of Robert Curzon, younger son of Assheton Curzon, 1st Viscount Curzon.

Harriet-Anne and Robert's son, the Honourable Robert Curzon, became the 14th Baron. He was notable for his collection of Coptic manuscripts (also known as the White Monastery manuscripts) which were bequeathed by his daughter Darea (in 1917) the 16th Baroness to the British Museum. On Robert's death the title first passed to a son, Robert Nathaniel Cecil George Curzon the 15th Baron, and then to a daughter, the aforementioned Darea.

Darea never married and was succeeded by her second cousin, Mary Cecil Frankland the 17th Baroness, who was the granddaughter of a younger son of the 13th Baroness.

Mary was succeeded by her grandson, James Assheton Frankland the 18th Baron, who in 1944 had already succeeded his father as the 12th Frankland Baronet of Thirkleby. James's son, William Thomas Assheton Frankland (born 23 July 1984), succeeded as the 19th Baron Zouche and 13th Baronet Frankland of Thirkleby in September 2022.

=== The Barony Zouche of Mortimer ===
A granddaughter of the original Alan la Zouche, Joyce la Zouche, married Robert Mortimer of Richard's Castle; one of her younger sons, William la Zouche, adopted his maternal surname of la Zouche and bought the reversion of the manor of Ashby-de-la-Zouch from Alan in 1304, the latter to hold it until his death (1314). By writ dated 26 December 1323, he was created Baron Zouche of Mortimer. This peerage descended through 5 barons and baronesses, but became abeyant in 1406.

== Barons la Zouche of Ashby (1299) ==
- Alan la Zouche, 1st Baron Zouche of Ashby (1267–1314)

The title became abeyant from 1314.

== Barons Zouche of Haryngworth (1308) ==
Arms of Zouche of Harringworth, Northamptonshire: Gules, ten bezants 4,3,2,1, a canton ermine (difference of senior line Zouche of North Molton and Ashby)

Barons Zouche of Haryngworth:

- William la Zouche, 1st Baron Zouche (18 or 21 December 1276 – 11 or 12 March 1351)
- William la Zouche, 2nd Baron Zouche (c. 25 December 1321 – 23 April 1382)
- William la Zouche, 3rd Baron Zouche (c. 1355 – 4 May 1396)
- William la Zouche, 4th Baron Zouche (c. 1373 – 3 November 1415)
- William la Zouche, 5th Baron Zouche (c. 1402 – 25 December 1462)
- William la Zouche, 6th Baron Zouche, 7th Baron St Maur (c. 1432 – 15 January 1468/9)
- John la Zouche, 7th Baron Zouche, 8th Baron St Maur (1459 – c. March 1525/6) (his attainder of 1485 was reversed in 1495)
- John la Zouche, 8th Baron Zouche, 9th Baron St Maur (c. 1486 – 10 August 1550)
- Richard la Zouche, 9th Baron Zouche, 10th Baron St Maur (c. 1510 – 22 July 1552)
- George la Zouche, 10th Baron Zouche, 11th Baron St Maur (c. 1526 – 19 June 1569)
- Edward la Zouche, 11th Baron Zouche, 12th Baron St Maur (6 June 1556 – 18 August 1625) (abeyant 1625)
- Cecil Bisshopp, 12th Baron Zouche (29 December 1752 – 11 November 1828) (abeyance terminated 1815; abeyant 1828)
- Harriet-Anne Curzon (née Bisshopp), 13th Baroness Zouche (7 September 1787 – 15 May 1870) (abeyance terminated 1829)
- Robert Curzon, 14th Baron Zouche (16 March 1810 – 2 August 1873), son of 13th Baroness
- Robert Nathaniel Cecil George Curzon, 15th Baron Zouche (12 July 1851 – 31 July 1914), son of 14th Baron
- Darea Curzon, 16th Baroness Zouche (1860–1917), sister of 15th Baron
- Mary Cecil Frankland, 17th Baroness Zouche (1875–1965), second cousin of 16th Baroness
- James Assheton Frankland, 18th Baron Zouche (1943–2022), grandson of 17th Baroness
- William Thomas Assheton Frankland, 19th Baron Zouche (b. 1984)

The heir apparent is the present holder's son, Hon Thomas Frankland (b. 2022).

== Barons Zouche of Mortimer (1323) ==
- William la Zouche, 1st Baron Zouche of Mortimer (d. 1337)
- Alan la Zouche, 2nd Baron Zouche of Mortimer (1317–1346)
- Hugh la Zouche, 3rd Baron Zouche of Mortimer (1338–1368)
- Robert la Zouche, 4th Baron Zouche of Mortimer (d. 1399)
- Joyce Burnell, 5th Baroness Zouche of Mortimer (d. 1406)

The title became abeyant from 1406.

== See also ==
- Ashby de la Zouch Castle
- House of Rohan
- Baron St Maur
- Bishopp baronets, of Parham
- Frankland baronets, of Thirkleby
