= Alan la Zouche, 1st Baron Zouche of Ashby =

Arms of Alan la Zouche, 1st Baron la Zouche of Ashby (1267–1314) as shown on his seal affixed to the Barons' Letter, 1301: Gules, ten bezants 4, 3, 2, 1. The arms of la Zouche are blazoned in various 13th- and 14th-century rolls of arms including the Falkirk Roll, the Caerlaverock Poem, Glover's Roll, & The Camden Roll as Gules, bezantée, i.e. with an unquantified scattering of bezants

Alan la Zouche, 1st Baron la Zouche of Ashby (9 October 1267 – shortly before 25 March 1314) was born at North Molton, Devonshire, the only son of Roger La Zouche and his wife, Ela Longespée, daughter of Stephen Longespée and Emmeline de Ridelsford. He received seisin of his father's lands after paying homage to the king on 13 October 1289. Alan was governor of Rockingham Castle and steward of Rockingham Forest. Alan La Zouche died without any sons shortly before at the age of 46, and his barony fell into abeyance among his daughters.

== Birth ==
Alan la Zouche was born in North Molton on St Denis's Day (9 October) 1267 and was baptised in the church there, as was testified by his uncle "Henry la Zuche, clerk" and several local and other gentry and clerics at his proof of age inquisition in 1289 which enabled him to exit royal wardship:

Alan son and heir of Roger la Zusche alias la Zuch, la Souche. Writ to Peter Heym and Robert de Radington, to enquire whether the said Alan, who is in the king's wardship, is of full age, as he says, or not, The eve of St. Margaret (20 June), 17 Edw. I. The said Alan, who was born at North Molton and baptized in the church there, was 21 on the day of St. Denis, 16 Edw. I. The Abbot of Lyleshull (Lilleshall Abbey in Shropshire, to which he gave the advowson of North Molton Church in 1313) says the said Alan was born in Devon on the feast of St. Denis, and was 22 at that feast last past, and he knows it because he was keeper of a grange of Alan's father at Assheby four years ago, and knew from his father and mother that he was then 18. The prior of Repindon agrees, and knows it because his predecessor was created prior in the same year and was prior for twelve years, and he himself has now been prior for ten years. The prior of Swaveseye agrees, for he has been prior for twenty years, and saw him (Alan) before his creation when he was 2 years old. The prior of Ulvescroft agrees, for he has enquired from religious men, and especially from the nuns of Gracedieu who dwell near Alan's father's manor of Assheby. Brother William Ysnach of Gerendon agrees, for he sued the pleas of the house for nearly twenty-two (?) years, and Alan was born at the feast of St. Denis preceding. Geoffrey prior of Brackele agrees, for he was always with Alan's ancestors and ... twenty-four years ago, and within two years following Alan was born. Richard le Flemyng, knight, (probably of Bratton Fleming) agrees, and knows it from the wife of William de Raleye (probably of Raleigh, Pilton) who nursed Alan. John Punchardon, knight, (probably of Heanton Punchardon) agrees, for he held his land for such a time. Alfred de Suleny, knight, agrees, for his firstborn son was born on the same day. John de Curteny, knight, (i.e. Courtenay) agrees, for his mother died at Easter before Alan was born. William (?) de Sancto Albino, knight, agrees, for his brother gave him certain land, which he has held for twenty-one years, and one year previously Alan was born. William L'Estrange (Latinised as "Extraneus"), knight, agrees, for his (Alan's ?) father made him a knight sixteen years ago last Christmas, when Alan carried the sword before him, and was then 6 years old, except between Christmas and St. Denis. Robert de Crues, knight, agrees, for he has a daughter of the same age. Henry la Zuche, clerk, agrees, for he is his uncle, and likewise knows it from him who was at that time parson of the church of Hamme. Walter parson of Manecestre agrees, for the church of Karlingford in Ireland was given to him nearly twenty-two years ago, and when the news came to him in Devon Alan's mother lay in childbed. Robert parson of Pakinton agrees, for he was instituted into his vicarage at the Purification last past now twenty-two years ago, and Alan was born at the feast of St. Denis following.

== Military service ==
Alan was in Gascony with King Edward I of England in October 1288, when he was one of the hostages given by the king to Alfonso of Aragon for the fulfilment of certain agreements. He was in Scotland in the King's service in June 1291. In April 1294 he had a writ of protection from the King when he travelled overseas with the King's daughter, Eleanor of Bar. He served in Gascony in 1295 and 1296, and was present at the action around Bordeaux on 28 March 1296, when his standard-bearer was captured by the French. In 1297 he was summoned for service in the Franco-Flemish War, and attended Councils in Rochester and London in that year.

=== War against the Scots ===
He was summoned for service against the Scots in 1297–1313. He fought in the Vanguard at the Battle of Falkirk on 22 July 1298. King Edward's army at that battle consisted of 12,000 infantry, including 10,000 Welsh, and 2,000 cavalry. William Wallace, the Scottish leader accepted battle in a withdrawn defensive position. Wallace had few cavalry and few archers, but his solid "schiltrons" (circles) of spearmen were almost invincible. The armoured cavalry of the English vanguard were hurled back with severe losses. Edward brought up his Welsh archers in the intervals between the horsemen of the second line, concentrating their arrows on specific points in the Scottish schiltrons. It was into these gaps that the English knights forced their way, and once the Scottish order was broken the spearmen were quickly massacred.

=== Siege of Caerlaverock ===
Alan was at the siege of Caerlaverock Castle in July 1300. His presence is recorded in the contemporary "Caerlaverock Poem", being an early roll of arms:

Aleyn de la Souche tresor Signiioit ke fust brians
Sa rouge baniere a besans
Car bienscai ki a dependu Tresor plus ke en burce pendu

An English translation of the stanza reads:

Alan de la Zouche there bore bezants on a scarlet banner.(Well I know he has spent more than his purse retains of treasure!)

"Sa rouge baniere a bezants" (as re-stated in modern French) "his red banner bezantée", is the description of the coat of arms he bore at the siege.

== Subsequent career ==
He was summoned to Edward II's coronation on 18 January 1307/08. In December of that year, he had a protection to go on a pilgrimage to Santiago de Compostela. He was the Constable of Rockingham Castle and the Keeper of the forests between the bridges of Oxford and Stamford.

== Marriage and issue ==
He married Eleanor de Segrave, daughter of Nicholas de Segrave, 1st Baron Segrave. At his death, he left no male progeny and the barony went into abeyance between his three daughters and co-heiresses:

- Ellen la Zouche, married Alan de Charlton; also married Nicholas de St Maur, 1st Baron St Maur (d.1316)
- Maud la Zouche, married Robert de Holland, 1st Baron Holand; she was the mother of Thomas Holland, who married Joan of Kent.
- Elizabeth la Zouche, married John Ingham (1320-12 Dec. 1365), son of Oliver de Ingham (c. 1287–1344).

Peerage of England
| New creation | Baron la Zouche of Ashby; 1299–1314 | Abeyant |
