= William de Cantilupe (died 1239) =

13th-century Anglo-Norman nobleman and sheriff

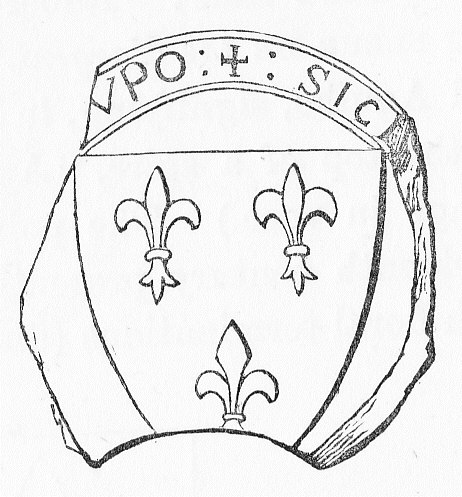
Seal of William de Cantilupe showing his arms Gules, three fleurs-de-lys or (Note: Original full legend probably: SIGILLUM WILLELMI DE CANTILUPO (Seal of William de Cantilupe). His seal was on occasion used to authenticate the letters of the young King Henry III. The arms of his descendants evolved in the late 13th century to 3 leopard's faces jessant-de-lys)

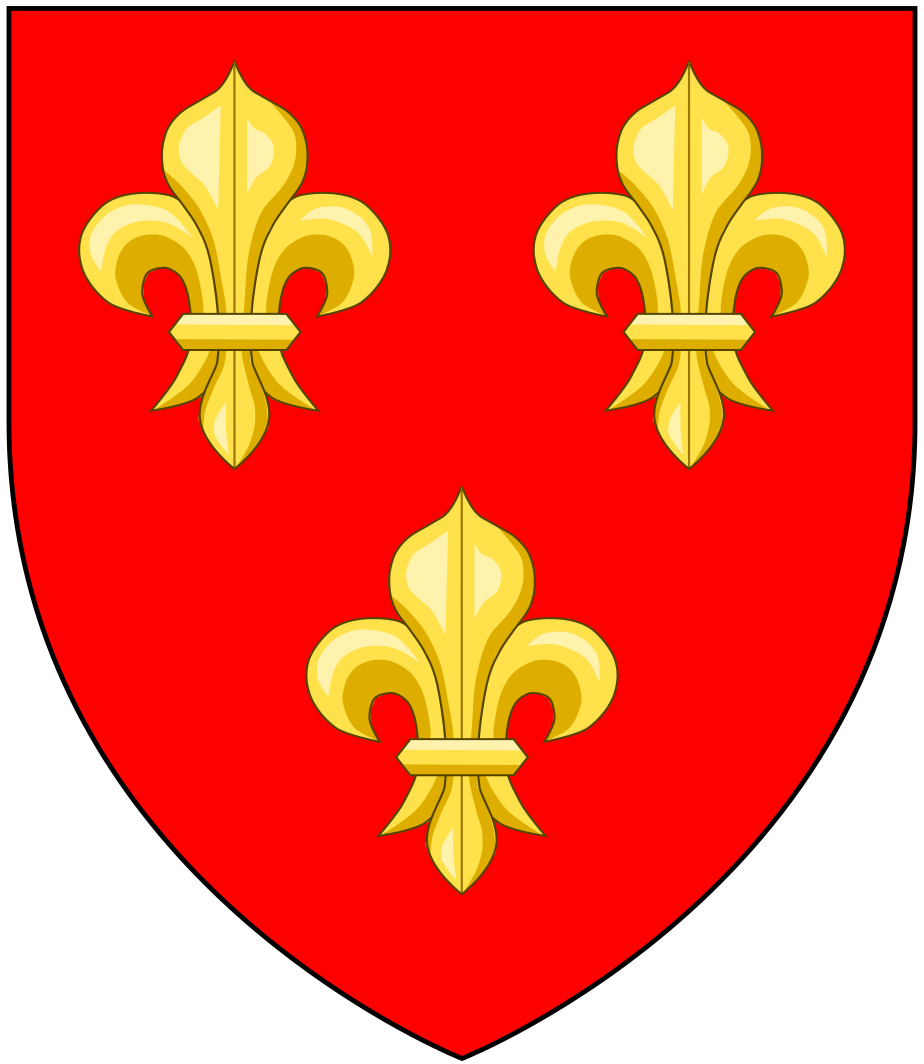
Arms of William de Cantilupe: Gules, three fleurs-de-lys or ("Cantilupe Ancient"). These arms changed in the late 13th century to jessant-de-lys

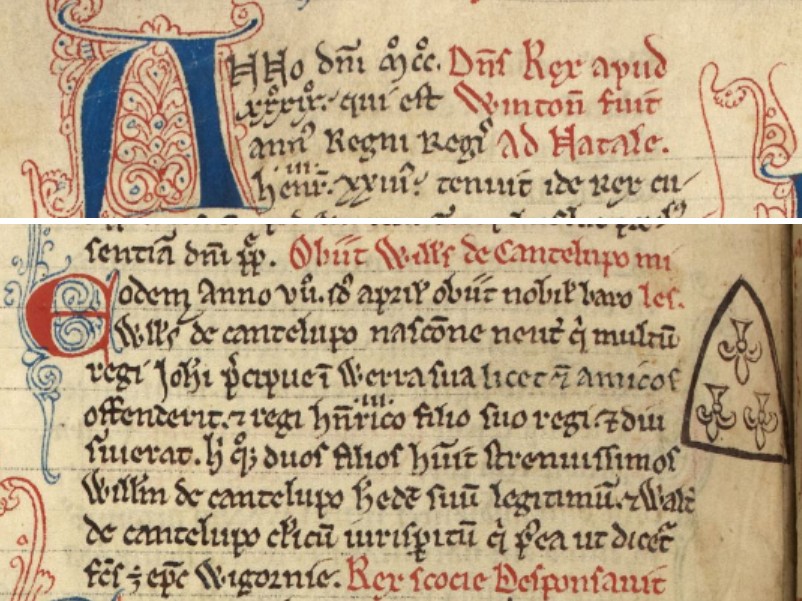
Death of William I de Cantilupe recorded by Matthew Paris (d.1259) in his Historia Anglorum, folio 128v, with his shield of arms inverted

William I de Cantilupe (c. 1159 - 7 April 1239) was an Anglo-Norman feudal lord and royal administrator who was the 1st feudal baron of Eaton Bray in Bedfordshire, England, and Baron of the Exchequer. He served as steward of the household to King John. His name was anciently spelled Cantelow, Cantelou or Canteloupe, and Latinised to de Cantilupo.

== Origins ==
He was born in about 1159 in Buckinghamshire, the son of Walter de Cantilupe and his wife Melette de Dinham, recorded in 1166 as a minor landowner in Essex and Lincolnshire, who was a younger brother of Fulk de Cantilupe (died 1217/18), Sheriff of Berkshire in 1200/1.

The de Cantilupe family which came to England at some time after the Norman Conquest of 1066 originated at one of several similarly named manors in Normandy, from which they took their name: Canteloup in Calvados, 11 miles east of Caen or Chanteloup in Bréhal, Manche, or Canteloup in Manche east of Cherbourg on the tip of the Cherbourg Peninsula.

== Career ==
=== Under King John ===
In 1198 Cantilupe was steward to John, Count of Mortain, the future King John, in which year his uncle Fulk de Cantilupe was also a member of John's household. From 1200 to 1204 he served as Sheriff of Worcestershire and in 1204 as Under-Sheriff of Herefordshire. In 1205 he took part in the ineffectual expedition to Poitou. In 1207, he was Sheriff of Worcestershire, serving until the end of the John's reign in 1216. In 1209, following his appointment as Sheriff of Warwickshire and Sheriff of Leicestershire, his main residence became Kenilworth Castle in Warwickshire.

Cantilupe was granted several manors formerly held by rebel barons during 1215–16, at the time of the signing of Magna Carta in 1215. He was commissioned by John to negotiate the return of such rebels to peaceable relations. He served as gaoler of baronial hostages, which action probably gained him the description by the contemporary chronicler Roger of Wendover as one of John's "evil counsellors".

In 1204, Cantilupe was granted the Warwickshire manor of Aston, to which as was usual for the purpose of differentiation, was appended his family name, now Aston Cantlow. This manor had previously been held by William de Tankerville "the Chamberlain" before it escheated to the crown.

In 1205 Cantilupe was granted the manor of Eaton, in Bedfordshire, (from the 16th-century "Eaton Bray") which became the caput of the Cantilupe feudal barony, where he built a castle described by the monks of nearby Dunstable Priory in the Annals of Dunstable as being "a serious danger to Dunstable and the neighbourhood". The grant was for knight-service of one knight and was in exchange for the manor of Great Coxwell, Berkshire, which had been granted to him previously but the grant was deemed compromised. Eaton had been held at the time of William the Conqueror by the latter's uterine half-brother Odo, Bishop of Bayeux, but later escheated to the crown.

=== Under King Henry III ===
Following the death of King John in 1216, many of the royal appointees to governorships of royal castles were reluctant to hand over their castles to the regency council which governed during the minority of his son, Henry III. They believed themselves obliged to hold their castles until Henry should have achieved 14 years of age, when he would be able to follow his own policy. These many refusals met with a forceful response from the council.

In 1217, under the regency council, during which year he was a Baron of the Exchequer, Cantilupe was at the siege of Mountsorrel Castle, Leicestershire, which was razed to the ground, and was also at the Second Battle of Lincoln. He served the council at the siege of Bedford in 1224. He later served in Wales (1228 and 1231) and Brittany (1230).

== Marriage and issue ==
He married Mazilia (or Marcelin/Mascelin) de Braci, daughter and heiress of Adulf de Braci of Mentmore in Buckinghamshire, who brought him that manor and others in Kent, and by whom he had issue including:

- William II de Cantilupe (died 1251), eldest son and heir, who following in his father's footsteps served as steward of the household to King Henry III, son of King John;
- Walter de Cantilupe (1195–1266), Bishop of Worcester, of which see his father had custody in 1208.
- John I de Cantilupe (fl.1251) of Hempston Cauntelow (now Broadhempston) near Totnes in Devon, who married Margaret Cumin, heiress of Snitterfield in Warwickshire. John's granddaughter and eventual sole heiress was Eleanor de Cantilupe (d.post-1344), who before 1321 married Sir Thomas West (d.1343), of Swallowcliffe, Wiltshire and Roughcombe Castle in Tisbury, Wiltshire, MP for Warwickshire in 1324; by whom she was the grandmother of Thomas West, 1st Baron West (1365–1405), who married Joan la Warre, heiress of Baron La Warre, whose younger son was Reynold West, 3rd Baron West, 6th Baron La Warre (1395–1450). His descendants survive today as Earls De La Warr and quarter the arms of Cantilupe of Hempston as Azure, three leopard's heads reversed jessant-de-lys or.
- Nicholas de Cantilupe, of whom Dugdale (1656) stated "I find no more than the bare mention";
- Isabel de Cantilupe, who married Stephen Devereux.

== Death and burial ==
Cantilupe died on 7 April 1239 and was buried at Studley Priory, Warwickshire.

== Manors held ==
Among the many manors held by Cantilupe were:

- Eaton, Bedfordshire.
- Ipsley, Warwickshire, as tenants of which the Hubbard family took the later arms of Cantilupe ("Cantilupe modern"), 3 leopard's faces jessant-de-lys.
- Brentingby, Leicestershire, as tenants of which the Woodforde family took the later arms of Cantilupe ("Cantilupe modern"), reversed.
- Calne, Wiltshire.
- Calstone, Wiltshire.
