= George de Cantilupe =

George de Cantilupe (1252–1273) (anciently Cantelow, Cantelou, Canteloupe, etc, Latinised to de Cantilupo) was Lord of Abergavenny from the Marches of South Wales under Edward I of England. He was born on 29 March 1252 at Abergavenny Castle in Monmouthshire, the son of William III de Cantilupe and Eva de Braose. He married Margaret de Lacy, of the powerful de Lacy dynasty, daughter of Edmund de Lacy, 2nd Earl of Lincoln and his wife Alasia, daughter of Manfred III, Marquess of Saluzzo, and Beatrix of Savoy.

He was named a Knights Bachelor on 13 October 1272.

His other estates, apart from Abergavenny, included the manor of Bridgwater in Somerset; there were also Irish estates. He died on 18 October 1273, aged 21. He was succeeded by his nephew John Hastings, 1st Baron Hastings.
