= Cantaloupe (disambiguation) =

Cantaloupe is a fruit.

Cantaloupe and its variant spellings may also refer to:

== Music ==
- "Cantaloupe Island", a jazz standard composed by Herbie Hancock and recorded on his 1964 album Empyrean Isles
- Cantaloupe Island (album), an album by French jazz fusion artist Jean-Luc Ponty first released in 1976
- Cantaloupe Music, a record label
- "Cantaloop" (Flip Fantasia), a 1993 song by Us3

== People ==
- Baron Cantilupe, barony by writ
  - William de Cantilupe, 1st Baron Cantilupe (1262–1308)
- Viscount Cantelupe, subsidiary title of the Earl De La Warr
  - George West, Viscount Cantelupe (1814–1850), eldest son of the 5th Earl
- April Cantelo (1928–2024), English soprano
- George de Cantilupe (1252–1273), Lord of Abergavenny
- Jim Cantalupo (1943–2004), American businessman
- Joseph Cantalupo (born 1943), Mafia informant
- Joseph Canteloube (1879–1957), French composer
- Julieta Cantaluppi (born 1985), Italian rhythmic gymnast
- Mario Cantaluppi (born 1974), Swiss footballer and manager
- Thomas de Cantilupe, Bishop of Hereford and Lord Chancellor of England
- William Cantelo (born 1839), British inventor
- Walter de Cantilupe (died 1266), Bishop of Worcester
- William de Cantilupe (died 1239), Anglo-Norman baron
- William de Cantilupe (died 1251), Anglo-Norman baron
- William de Cantilupe (died 1254), Lord of Abergavenny
- William de Cantilupe (died 1375), murdered by his household

== Places ==
=== France ===
- Canteloup, Calvados, Normandy
- Canteloup, Manche, Normandy
- Chanteloup (disambiguation), several places
- Canteleu, Normandy
- Canteleux, Pas-de-Calais, Artois
- Cantaloube, hamlet of Villefranche-de-Rouergue, Aveyron
- Canteloube, hamlet of Lacave, Lot

=== Italy ===
- Cantalupa, district of Milan, quarter of Zone 5 of Milan
- Cantalupa, Piedmont
- Cantalupo, Bevagna, Umbria
- Cantalupo in Sabina, Lazio, after which the fruit is named
- Cantalupo Ligure, Piedmont
- Cantalupo nel Sannio, Molise
- Cantalupo, Alessandria, Piemonte

=== United Kingdom ===
- Aston Cantlow, Warwickshire, named for the de Cantilupe family
- Broadhempston, Devon, formerly Hempston Cauntelow
  - Manor of Broad Hempston, owned by the Cantilupe family
- Cantelowes (ward), London Borough of Camden
- Chilton Cantelo, Somerset, named for the Cantilupe family

== Other ==
- Cantaloupe, Inc.
- the Marquis Canteloupe, fictional nobleman and politician in the Alms for Oblivion novels of Simon Raven

== See also ==
- Cantalupo (disambiguation)
