= Parco Spina Verde di Como =

Regional park in Lombardy, Italy

Spina Verde Regional Park
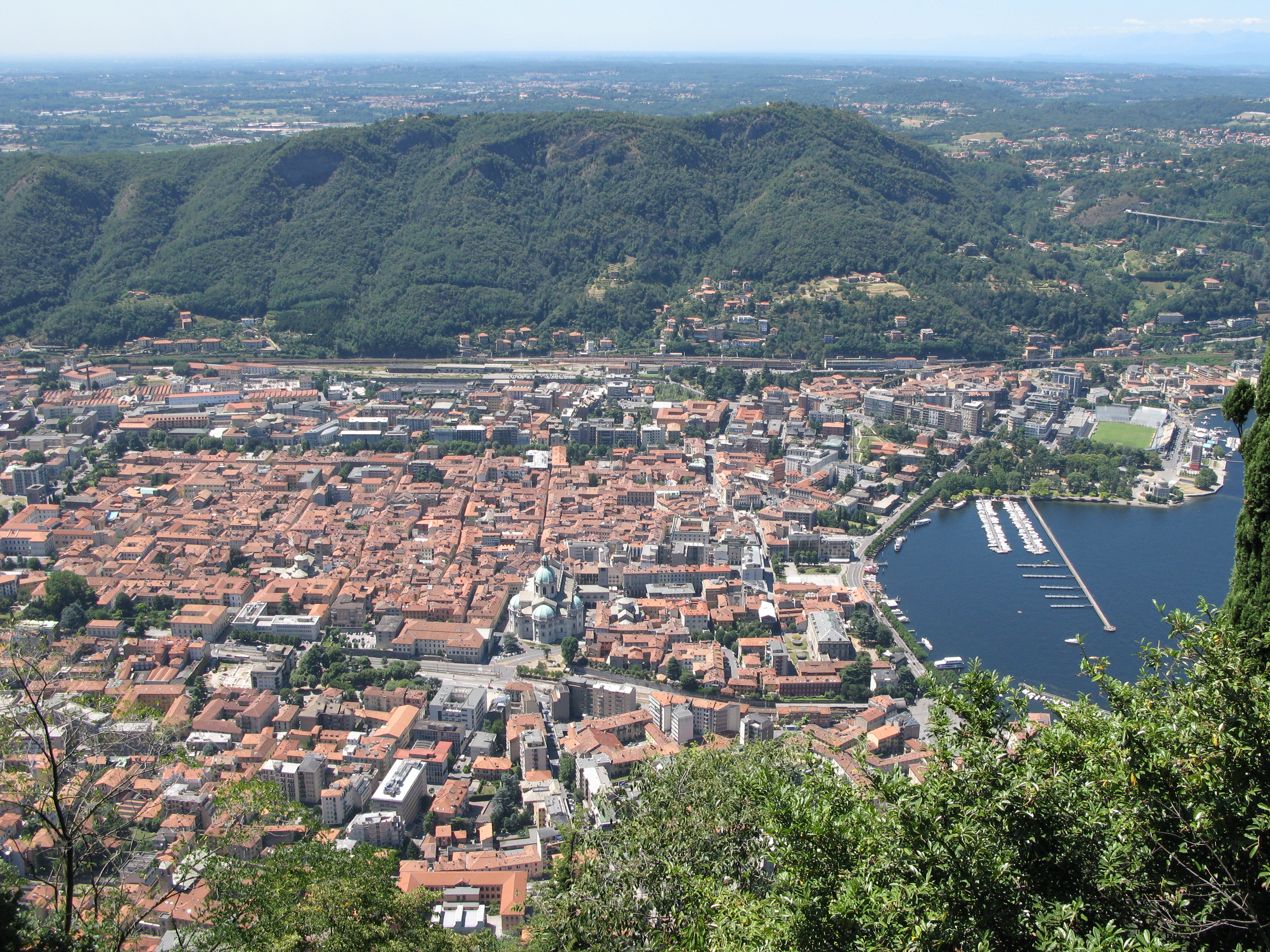
- The city of Como with, in the background, the hills in the northeastern portion of the Park.
- Interactive map of Spina Verde Regional Park
- Location: Lombardy, Italy
- Nearest city: Como
- Area: 1,179 ha (2,910 acres)
- Established: Regional Law 10 March 4, 1993
- Governing body: Parco regionale Spina Verde (public law entity); Via Imbonati 1; 22020 San Fermo della Battaglia, loc. Cavallasca (CO)

The Parco Spina Verde di Como is a regional natural park in Lombardy, northern Italy. It covers a hill ridge overlooking the town of Como, and borders on its northern side with Switzerland. It is in the town territory of Como (east) and the nearby municipalities of Colverde (west) and San Fermo della Battaglia (south). It was established in 1993 by a Regional Act (L. R. n. 10/1993) and is administered by the Region of Lombardy. It takes its name from the elevated ridge upon which it stretches, called Spina Verde (green thorn). The park administration is in Villa Imbonati, in San Fermo della Battaglia. Part of the park borders Switzerland and, in particular, the Penz Hill park.

Tourism is focused on nature, which presents peculiar geological and botanical aspects, archeology, due to the remains of protohistoric Como and history, with important historical traces of the Comasco area, in particular the Castel Baradello and the Northern Frontier. The landscape and hiking value of the park area is also remarkable, offering exceptional panoramic views over the Lombard plain, the Lombard Prealps, and Lake Como.

The numerous places of worship, from religious buildings of valuable historical and architectural merit to sites attributable to ancient cults, sanctuaries, and places of traditional manifestations, also identify Spina Verde as a privileged seat for the study of the evolution of religious culture.

The park features a dense network of trails. The park headquarters is in San Fermo della Battaglia, in the locality of Cavallasca. There are also many accommodation facilities (farmhouses and restaurants) offering widespread and high-quality catering throughout the year.

== Monuments and places of interest ==
=== Archaeological sites ===
==== Pianvalle site ====
Of notable interest is the Pianvalle site, on Monte Croce (via Monte Croce, municipality of Como). It is an area of about 150 hectares that hosts remains of a protohistoric settlement attributable to the Golasecca culture and proto-Celtic populations. The settlement was inhabited from the 9th century BC to the first half of the 4th century BC. The archaeological area includes foundations of rectangular huts, dry stone wall remains, a stepped path and a large boulder with rock engravings. These artifacts, found during various excavation campaigns starting from the early 1970s, date back to the 9th century BC (late Bronze Age) and to a subsequent phase of maximum expansion of the settlement between the 5th-4th century BC, during the flourishing of the Celtic civilization and the consolidation of the Insubres, inhabitants of western Lombardy, in whose territory Como and its surroundings were included. According to experts, it is one of the very first stable urban nuclei of Como, later moved to the plain between the current Breccia and Montano Lucino, a theory confirmed by the many finds made precisely in that area.

==== Pianvalle rock ====
Immediately beside the protohistoric settlement, the Pianvalle rock (a vertical outcrop of gonfolite) has aroused the interest of experts for the notable engravings present: cup marks (small semicircular cavities, very common in the Alpine area), spirals, geometric and serpentine motifs, of uncertain meaning, perhaps ritual or social. Among the engravings stands out a circle with rays inside and a stylized axe. Acts of vandalism have instead irreparably damaged an engraving depicting a man in prayer.

==== Fonte della Mojenca ====
Remaining in the Municipality of Como, another site of interest is the Fonte della Mojenca (whose name may derive from the Celtic words muit or moier, or from Lombard möi or moia, terms all indicating a place rich in water). Located a short distance from the Pianvalle settlement, the spring is a short artificial cave built between the 10th and 5th century BC, in three successive phases, and intended for rites and cults probably Druidic. The spring has been preserved intact, which is already very rare for such an ancient artifact. At the top of the conduit, about 20 m long, there is a natural spring now almost extinct (water flows only in case of heavy rains). The spring was the object of cults linked to water, as also appears from the artificial basin carefully made in a trefoil shape in front of the gallery entrance, located in a suggestive natural amphitheater. The basin was the first artifact to be built; in a second phase the cave was made, of sandstone, buried pebbles and covering slabs in serizzo. In a third and final phase, ceramic materials datable to the 5th century BC were deposited there. The Mojenca cave was built by its ancient builders so that on the winter solstice, December 21, the sun enters directly into the conduit and illuminates the living rock spring; this too is an element attributable to solar cults, and makes the Fonte della Mojenca a precious historical testimony.

==== Camera Grande and Camera Carugo ====
From the Leno locality in the city district of Prestino it is possible to reach two large rectangular chambers from the late Bronze Age (10th-9th century BC) carved into the living rock of the hill: the Camera Grande, measuring 8.71 m x 5.05 m and the smaller Camera Carugo. Both are located along an ancient path that from the foot of the hill climbed to the Pianvalle settlement, of which they were certainly part, and their function is still unknown: perhaps dwellings, perhaps fortifications or production sites. Holes for poles or beams, made in the rock, suggest they were equipped with canopies and walls, and there are drainage channels carefully chiseled. At the highest point, the walls of the Camera Grande are another 3.15 m. Therefore, the Camera Grande and Camera Carugo are examples of exceptionally well-preserved protohistoric architecture of high archaeological interest. Furthermore, it is assumed that the two chambers were equipped with straw coverings, structured like the roofs of the so-called masün still visible in Garzeno. The Camera Grande had residential functions, while for the Camera Carugo it is presumed to have been a room used for metalworking.

=== Civil and military architectures ===
==== Castel Baradello ====
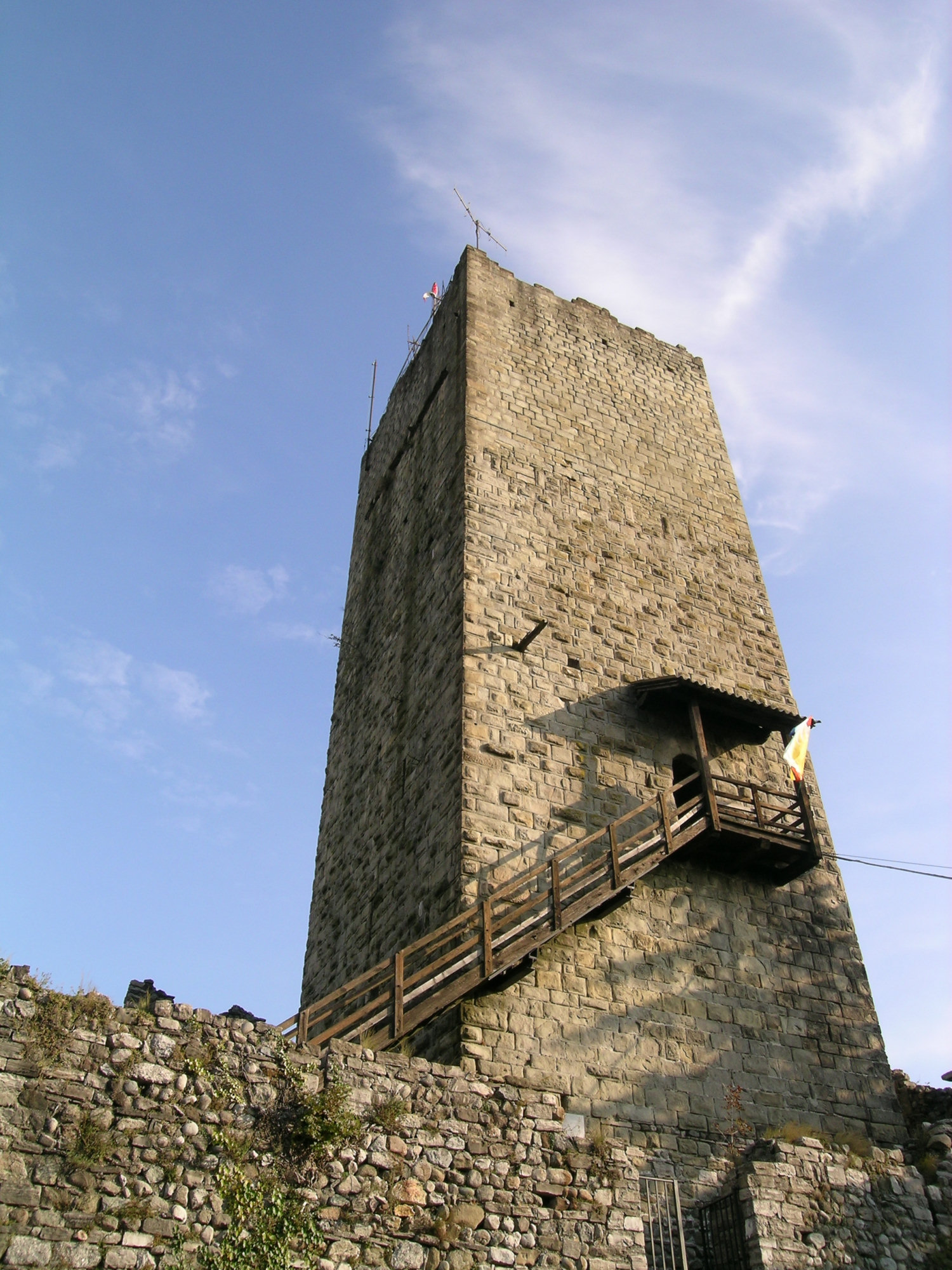
Castel Baradello: main tower, the only building of the castle complex still accessible. It is surrounded by the visible remains of a vast fortification, a stronghold of an articulated system of fortifications demolished by the Spanish in 1526 to deprive Como of its defenses.

Symbol of Como visible from afar, the castle stands on the eastern slopes of the Como hill ridge and was part of a medieval fortification system that from the Baradello hill, descended into the current Camerlata to climb the opposite Monte Goi (also known as Monte Goj). Built in the 12th century by order of Frederick Barbarossa, on remains of pre-existing Roman and Lombard buildings, it features a well-preserved tower (visitable), remains of walls and perimeter buildings, and traces of a wall that encircled the entire slope of the Baradello hill down to Camerlata. Demolished with its walls in 1526 by the Spanish, except for the tower, which in the medieval era was the prison of Napoleone della Torre.

==== Northern Frontier ====
Monte Sasso in Cavallasca and Monte Olimpino, in the western area of the park (municipality of San Fermo d. B.) feature numerous defensive military works built between 1917 and 1918 by order of General Luigi Cadorna, who wanted to fortify the entire Italian-Swiss border in fear of a German invasion through Switzerland; trenches, underground galleries, casemate positions with the Monte Sasso fort standing out, are still in good condition and connected by an efficient military road.

==== Scala del Paradiso ====
Built in the early 1900s, it consists of around 900 steps and was intended to facilitate patrols of the Italian-Swiss border by the Royal Finance Guard: it descends from Monte Sasso in Cavallasca to Chiasso. Instead, it facilitated smuggling, which immediately made use of the structure. It is a distinctive testimony of the smuggling era, now disappeared but still very much alive in the historical memory of the Comasco area.

==== Camerlata quarry ====
The quarry from which sandstone was extracted for centuries, including for the construction of the Castel Baradello and the basilicas of Como, is now characterized by steep rock faces and significant vertical relief. An observation point offers views over the surrounding plain, and the site can be visited by prior request.

==== Royal Army powder magazine ====
At the eastern end of the park, in the Valbasca locality, a military powder magazine built in 1940 to store ammunition in a safe place outside the inhabited center of Como, between two natural ridges that provided excellent protection in case of accidental explosions, is still present. After years of decay, the complex was partially restored in the second decade of the 21st century. The complex of sentry boxes and casemates, a typical example of military architecture of the time, is visible from the path and is in a suggestive natural setting. The powder magazine was the object, in 1941, of the only air bombing suffered by Como, when a British aircraft dropped some bombs that caused no damage.

=== Religious architectures ===
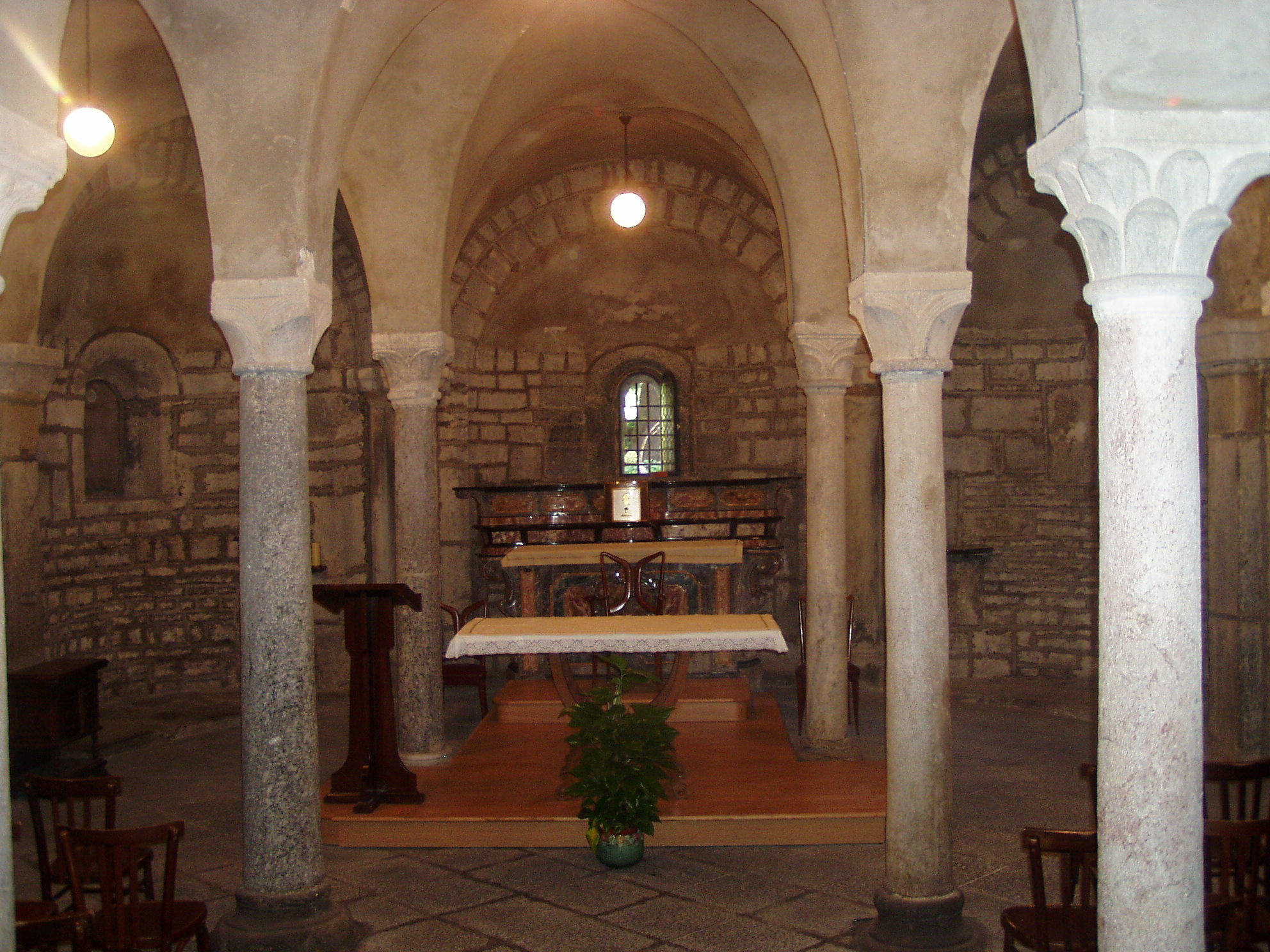
The crypt of the Basilica of San Carpoforo: saints Carpoforo and Felice were buried there.

==== Basilica of S. Carpòforo (municipality of Como) ====
Probably the oldest church in Como, according to a widespread version built in the 4th century by St. Felice, the first Christian bishop of Como, on a pre-existing pagan temple. The saint's remains were buried in the suggestive crypt, later translated but the sarcophagus remains. Building with a singular plan, with facade against the hill wall and side entrance, probably due to the pre-existing Roman structure, or ancient landslides.

==== Basilica of S. Abbondio (municipality of Como) ====
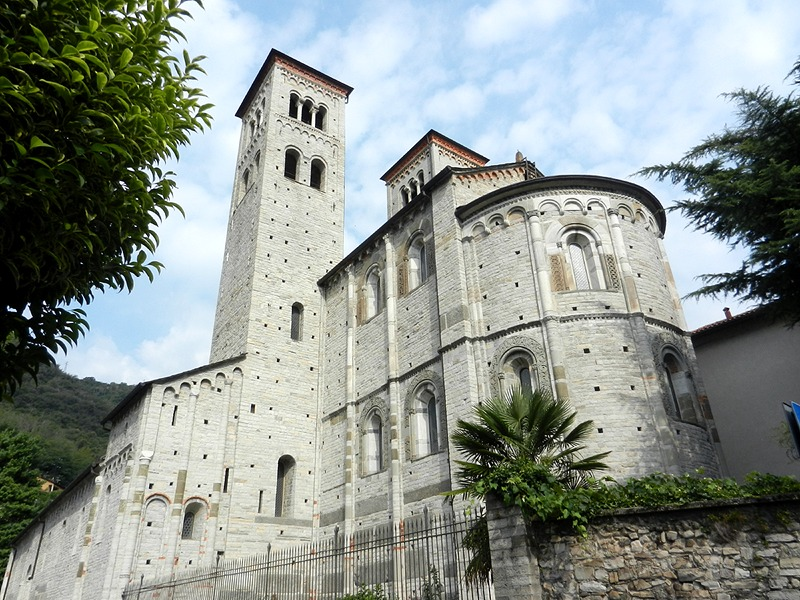
The Basilica of S. Abbondio, jewel of Lombard Romanesque; the facade is decorated with valuable friezes, work of the famous Maestri Comacini

Superb example of Lombard Romanesque, it was built by Benedictine monks on the remains of a paleochristian basilica and consecrated in 1095. It features splendid external decorations, made by the Comacine masters, and a valuable pictorial cycle in the apse.

==== Cross of Saint Eutichio ====
The summit of Monte Croce (550 m asl) hosts the "Cross of Saint Eutichio". It is a metal structure with a concrete base, equipped with lighting. Designed in 1933, the cross was made and installed the following year, as a gift from the Azione Cattolica of Como, replacing a previous wooden cross.

==== Church of S. Rocco or "of the Painters" (municipality of S. Fermo d. B.) ====
The church, built in 1857 on a lazaretto, has the interesting characteristic of having been decorated in 1978 by as many as 14 different artists specially convened, who created a cycle of frescoes of the Passion.

=== Naturalistic sites ===
==== Parè wetland (municipality of Colverde) ====
Interesting biotope located on the "confinale path", consisting of a small area with natural springs, where protected animal species coexist (Lataste's red frog and salamanders).

==== Springs of the Seveso (municipality of S. Fermo d. B.) ====
Inside the park, at the foot of Sasso di Cavallasca and a few meters from the Swiss border, the Seveso river springs. The spring, protected by a stone structure, has great environmental importance also because it hosts a colony of river crayfish, almost disappeared elsewhere.

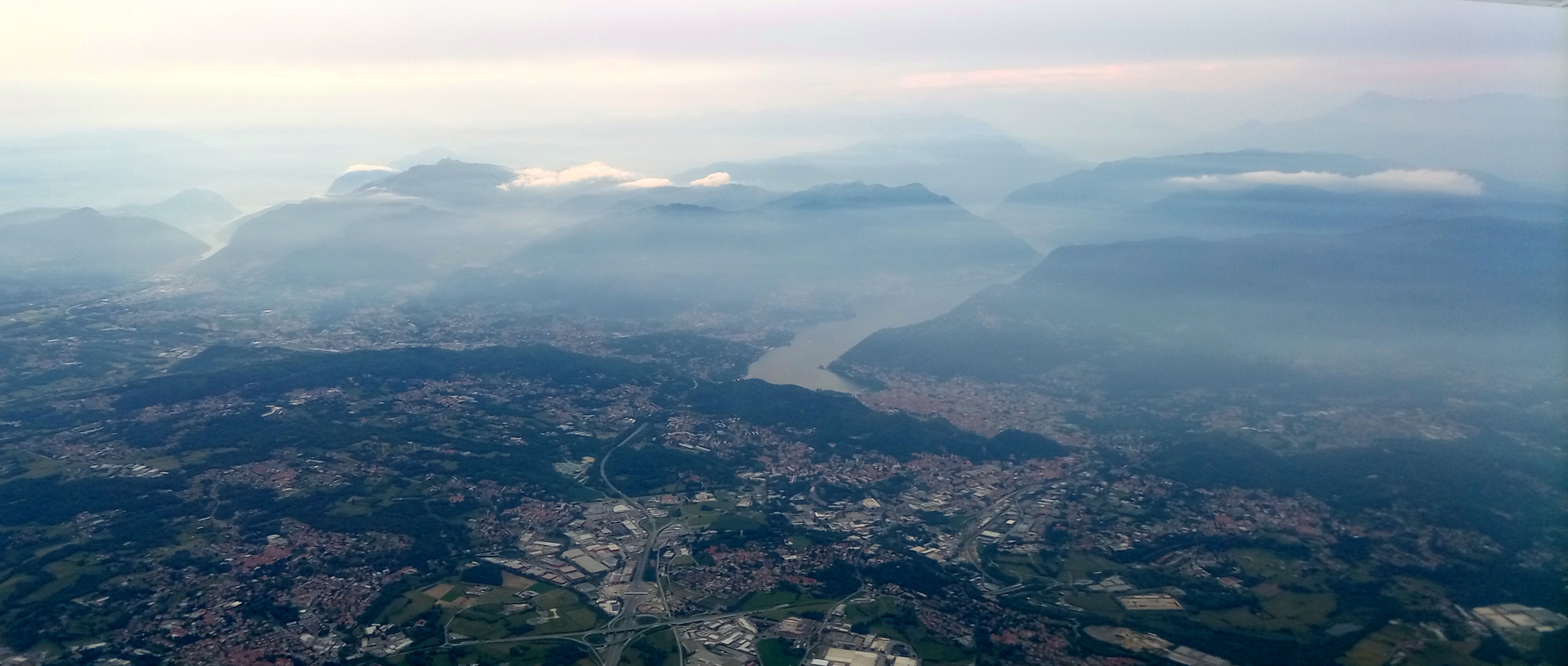
View from the south on the outskirts of Como, with the hills of Spina Verde clearly identifiable.

=== Panoramic points ===
The entire park has a strong panoramic vocation, being a hill ridge that towers over the plain; among the various hills that are part of the green area, the highest are Monte Sasso (618 m asl), Monte Croce (550 m asl), Monte Caprino (487 m asl), Monte Goi (476 m asl), Colle del Respau and Monte Baradello (432 m asl). Among these, Monte Goi, Colle Respaù and the Pin Umbrela clearing (on Monte Sasso) offer in particular an unparalleled 360° view over the entire Lombard plain, Lake Como and the Swiss Alps. Numerous rest stations are present along the paths in the most panoramic points.

== Trails ==
(Trail 1) "The Hill Ridge"

(Route): Panoramic

(Accessibility): On foot

(Difficulty): Easy

(Travel Time): 2h

(Interest): Panoramic, History

(Trail 2) "Confinale"

(Route): History, Archaeological

(Accessibility): On foot

(Difficulty): Easy

(Travel Time): 3h

(Interest): History

(Trail 3) "Sant'Eutichio"

(Route): History, Archaeological

(Accessibility): On foot

(Difficulty): Challenging

(Travel Time): 40min

(Interest): Flora, Religion, History

(Trail 4) "Monte Caprino"

(Route): History, Archaeological

(Accessibility): On foot

(Difficulty): Easy

(Travel Time): 45min

(Interest): Panorama, Religion, History

(Trail 5) "Monte Goj"

(Route): Panoramic

(Accessibility): On foot

(Difficulty): Easy

(Travel Time): 20min

(Interest): Flora, Panorama, History

(Trail 6) "Valbasca"

(Route): Naturalistic

(Accessibility): On foot

(Difficulty): Easy

(Travel Time): 25min

(Interest): Panorama, History

(Trail 7) "Cavallasca"

(Route): History, Archaeological

(Starting point): Villa Imbonati (Como)

(Accessibility): On foot

(Difficulty): Easy

(Travel Time): 2h

(Interest): History

(Trail 8) "Naturalistic Trail of Parè"

(Starting point): Località La Torre (Cavallasca)

(Accessibility): On foot

(Difficulty): Easy

(Travel Time): 1h 30min

(Interest): Flora

(Trail 9) "Fitness Path" (Valbasca)

(Route): Sporting

(Accessibility): On foot

(Difficulty): Easy

(Travel Time): 1h

(Trail 10) "Baradello"

(Route): History, Archaeological

(Accessibility): On foot

(Difficulty): Easy

(Travel Time): 25min

(Interest): History

(Trail 11) "Protohistoric"

(Route): History, Archaeological

(Accessibility): On foot

(Difficulty): Easy

(Travel Time): 2h

(Interest): History

(Trail 12) "Via Lucis"

(Accessibility): On foot

(Difficulty): Easy

(Travel Time): 25min

(Interest): History

(Trail 13) "Water Trail"

(Route): Naturalistic

(Accessibility): On foot

(Difficulty): Easy

(Travel Time): 50min

(Interest): Flora, Panorama, History

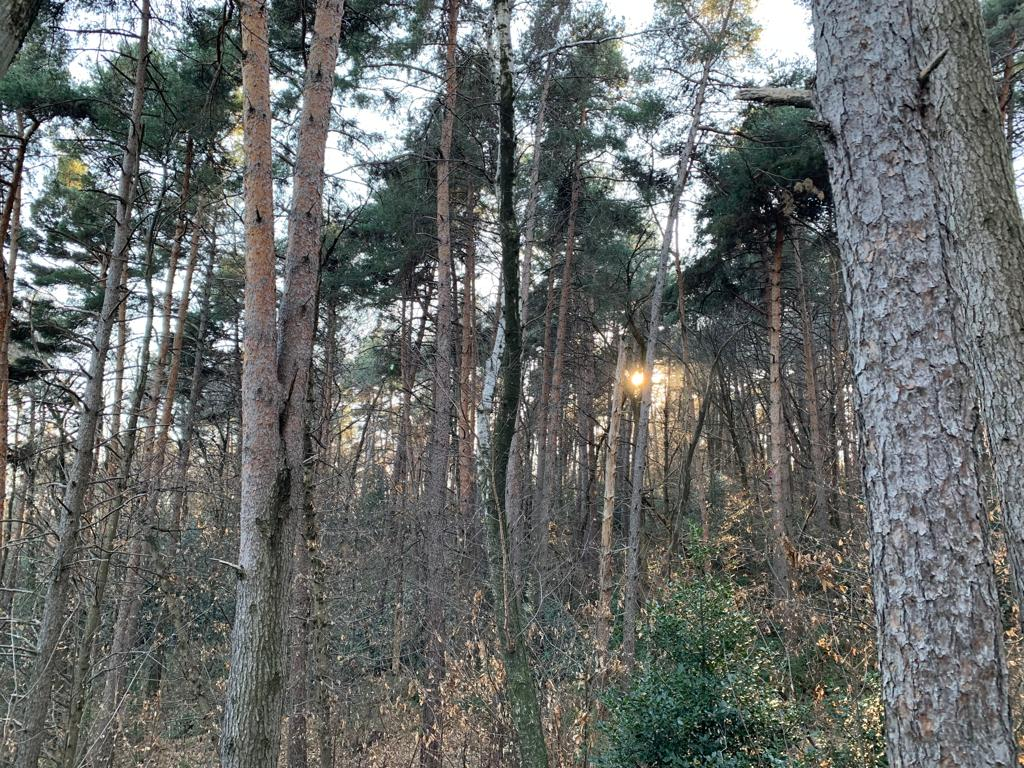
Naturalistic panorama on Trail 12 towards Cavallasca with a view of the forest covered with stone pines

== Accessibility ==
The entire area is well served by road and rail links.

=== Roads ===
A9 motorway Milan-Como-Chiasso, Como Sud or Como Monte Olimpino exit.

== Legal status of the park ==
Established with Regional Law no. 10 of 1993 of the Lombardy Region, the park is managed by a consortium that includes the Province of Como and the municipalities in whose territory the park falls (currently: Como, San Fermo della Battaglia and Colverde).

== See also ==
- Como
- Seveso

== Bibliography ==
- Renato Manzoni; Enzo Pifferi; Federico Saladanna. Parco Regionale Spina Verde (ed.). Conoscere il nostro parco [Knowing our park]. Como: Tipografia Banfi Editore.
- Renato Manzoni; Enzo Pifferi. Parco Spina Verde. Como: E.P.I. - Enzo Pifferi Editore. ISBN 88-88174-51-6.
