= Seveso (river) =

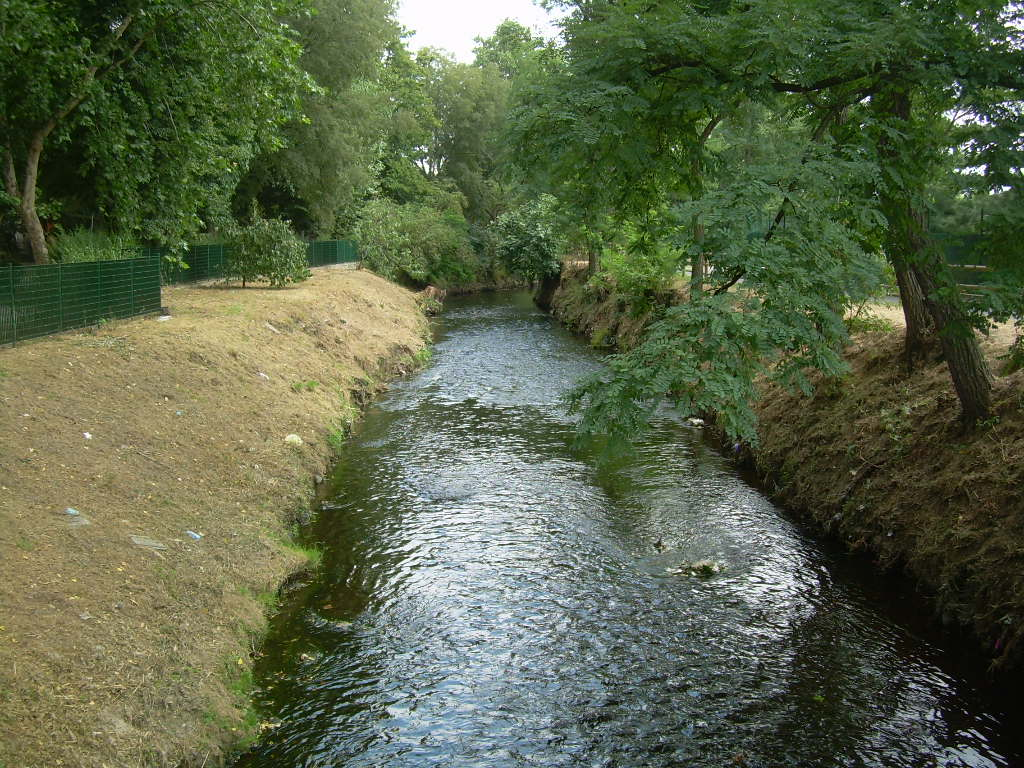

Location
- Country: Italy

Physical characteristics
- Source
  - location: Cavallasca on Monte Sasso, Province of Como, Lombardy
  - elevation: 490 m (1,610 ft)
- Mouth
  - location: the Naviglio Martesana canal in Milan
  - coordinates: 45.4942°N 9.2065°E
- Length: 56 km (35 mi)
- Basin size: 930 km^{2} (360 sq mi)
- Discharge
  - average: 1.8 m^{3}/s (64 cu ft/s)

Basin features
- Progression: Naviglio Martesana→ Lambro→ Po→ Adriatic Sea

The Seveso (Italian pronunciation: [ˈsɛːvezo]; Lombard: Séves [ˈseːʋes]) is a 55-kilometre (34 mi) Italian river that flows through the provinces of Como, Monza e Brianza and Milan. It rises on Sasso di Cavallasca or Monte Sasso of Cavallasca, near San Fermo della Battaglia. From here its course runs through the communes Montano Lucino, Grandate, Civello, Casnate con Bernate, Portichetto, Fino Mornasco, Cucciago, Vertemate con Minoprio, Asnago, Carimate, Cimnago, Lentate sul Seveso, Camnago, Barlassina, Seveso, Cesano Maderno, Binzago, Bovisio-Masciago, Varedo, Palazzolo Milanese, Paderno Dugnano, Cusano Milanino, Cormano, Bresso.

Finally, at Milan, it joins with the canal called the Naviglio Martesana which flows into the Lambro.

The Seveso is sometimes called il fiume nero, or "the black river," on account of the colour it acquires from industrial pollutants.

The 'Oltreseveso' is the area in the north-west of Lombardy, (it is ‘oltre’ (beyond) the Seveso river). The beyond Seveso Brianzolo, ( of Brianza), consists of the municipalities of Cermenate, Lazzate, Misinto, Cogliate, Ceriano Laghetto, Solaro and Limbiate.
