= Cantalupo =

Cantalupo may refer to:

== Places in Italy ==
- Cantalupo in Sabina (town in Lazio (or "Latium") region)
- Cantalupo nel Sannio (town in Molise)
- Cantalupo Ligure (municipality in Piedmont)
- Cantalupo di Bevagna (frazione in Umbria)
- there are also several other smaller frazioni (subdivisions or hamlets) of that name in Olgiate Comasco, Montano Lucino and Cerro Maggiore.

== People with the surname ==
- Jim Cantalupo (1943–2004), American businessman
- Joseph Cantalupo, American mafia member

== See also ==
- Cantalupa
- Cantaloupe (disambiguation)
