= Canteloup =

Canteloup may refer to communes in France:

- Canteloup, Calvados, in the Calvados département
- Canteloup, Manche, in the Manche département

== See also ==
- Cantaloupe (disambiguation)
