= Cantaluppi =

Cantaluppi is an Italian surname. Notable people with the surname include:

- Julieta Cantaluppi (born 1985), Italian rhythmic gymnast and coach
- Mario Cantaluppi (born 1974), Swiss footballer and manager

== See also ==
- Cantaloupe (disambiguation)
