= Bennet (supermarket) =

Italian supermarket chain

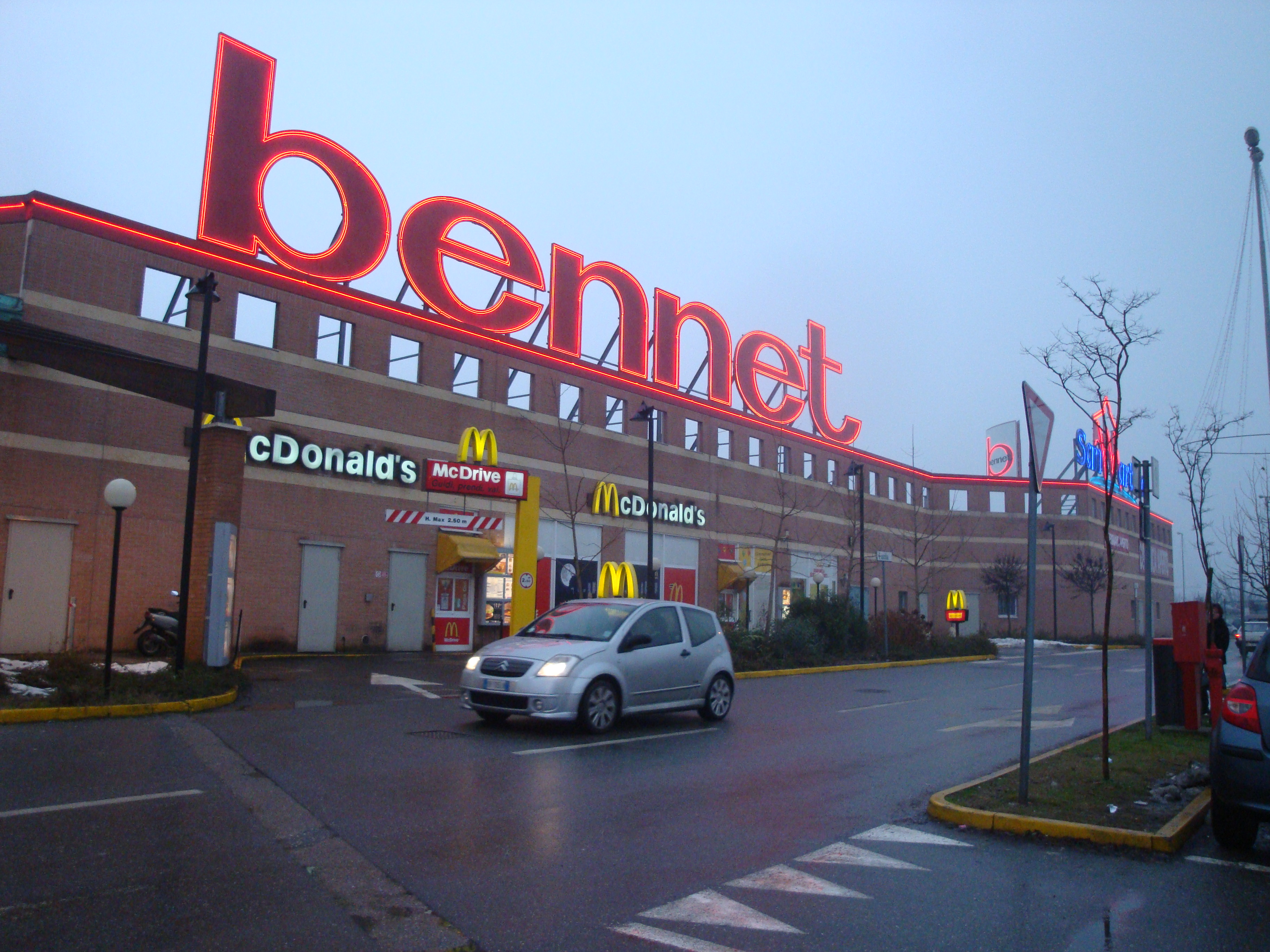
- Bennet supermarket in San Martino Siccomario
- Company type: Società per azioni
- Industry: Retail
- Founded: 1964
- Headquarters: Montano Lucino (CO), Italy
- Number of locations: 72 points of sale
- Area served: Emilia Romagna; Friuli-Venezia Giulia; Liguria; Lombardy; Piedmont; Veneto
- Key people: Enzo Ratti (founder)
- Products: Food and consumer goods
- Revenue: ▲€ 1.6 billion (2019)
- Number of employees: 8000 (2020)
- Website: www.bennet.com

Bennet is the name of a hypermarket / supermarket chain with 71 retail locations in northern Italy. The business was founded by Enzo Ratti in 1964 at Como and the head office is still located in nearby Montano Lucino. Most of the commercial outlets are located in Lombardy (39) or Piedmont (26); the rest are in Emilia-Romagna (4), Veneto (1), Friuli-Venezia Giulia (1) and Liguria (1).
