= George R. Jensen Jr. =

American businessman

George R. Jensen Jr. is an American businessman who founded USA Technologies Inc., (USAT), a high-tech company that developed the ePort, the first wireless networked cashless payment technology for vending machines, unattended Point-of-Sale (POS) terminals, and kiosks.

Jensen founded USA Technologies in 1992, when he envisioned a world of cashless vending, and served as Chairman of the Board and Chief Executive Officer during his tenure.

The ePort cashless product line includes the ePort G8, a payment terminal which allows consumers to pay for items at vending machines, kiosks and POS terminals with magnetic swipe bank cards, contactless cards, FOB, PIN, and cellular phones, and the ePort EDGE which was developed for magnetic swipe cards only.

Under his leadership, the ePort EDGE in 2010 won the inaugural National Automatic Merchandising Association (NAMA) award for innovation in cashless vending technology. NAMA is the vending industry's national body.

His management also led to USA Technologies being ranked among the leading shippers of point-of-sale terminals over the past three years by The Nilson Report, a source of news and research on consumer payment systems worldwide. In the latest 2009 survey, USA Technologies was ranked 6th in POS shipments in the United States and 31st in the world.

More recently, USA Technologies was named to Deloitte L.L.P's 2010 Technology Fast 500 List of the fastest growing companies in North America.

In 1985 Jensen founded American Film Technologies where he served as Chairman, Director, and CEO until 1992. AFT is a film colorization company that creates color imaged versions of black-and-white films. During his leadership, Jensen was awarded a contract from Ted Turner, the American film magnate and founder of the CNN news service, to convert 200 black-and-white films to color. Jensen grew AFT to more than 500 employees.

In 1989 Jensen was named 'Entrepreneur of the Year' for the Philadelphia area by Inc. Magazine and by Ernst & Young for Technology Leadership.

Jensen launched his entrepreneurial career in 1975 as CEO and President of International Film Productions Inc. He was Executive Producer of the 12-hour miniseries, "A.D.", filmed in Tunisia. Procter & Gamble co-produced and sponsored the epic, which aired in 1985 for five consecutive days on the NBC network. The epic was a continuation of the highly acclaimed mini-series, "Jesus of Nazareth". He was Executive Producer of the 1983 film special, "A Tribute to Princess Grace" shown on Public Television.

Jensen began his career as a securities broker from 1971 to 1978, primarily for the firm Smith Barney Harris Upham.

Jensen graduated from The University of Tennessee where he received his Bachelor of Science degree, as well as The Wharton School of the University of Pennsylvania where he was a graduate of the Advanced Management Program.
