= Le Chesne =

Le Chesne may refer to the following communes in France:

- Le Chesne, Ardennes, in the Ardennes département
- Le Chesne, Eure, in the Eure département
