= Hydrography of Milan =

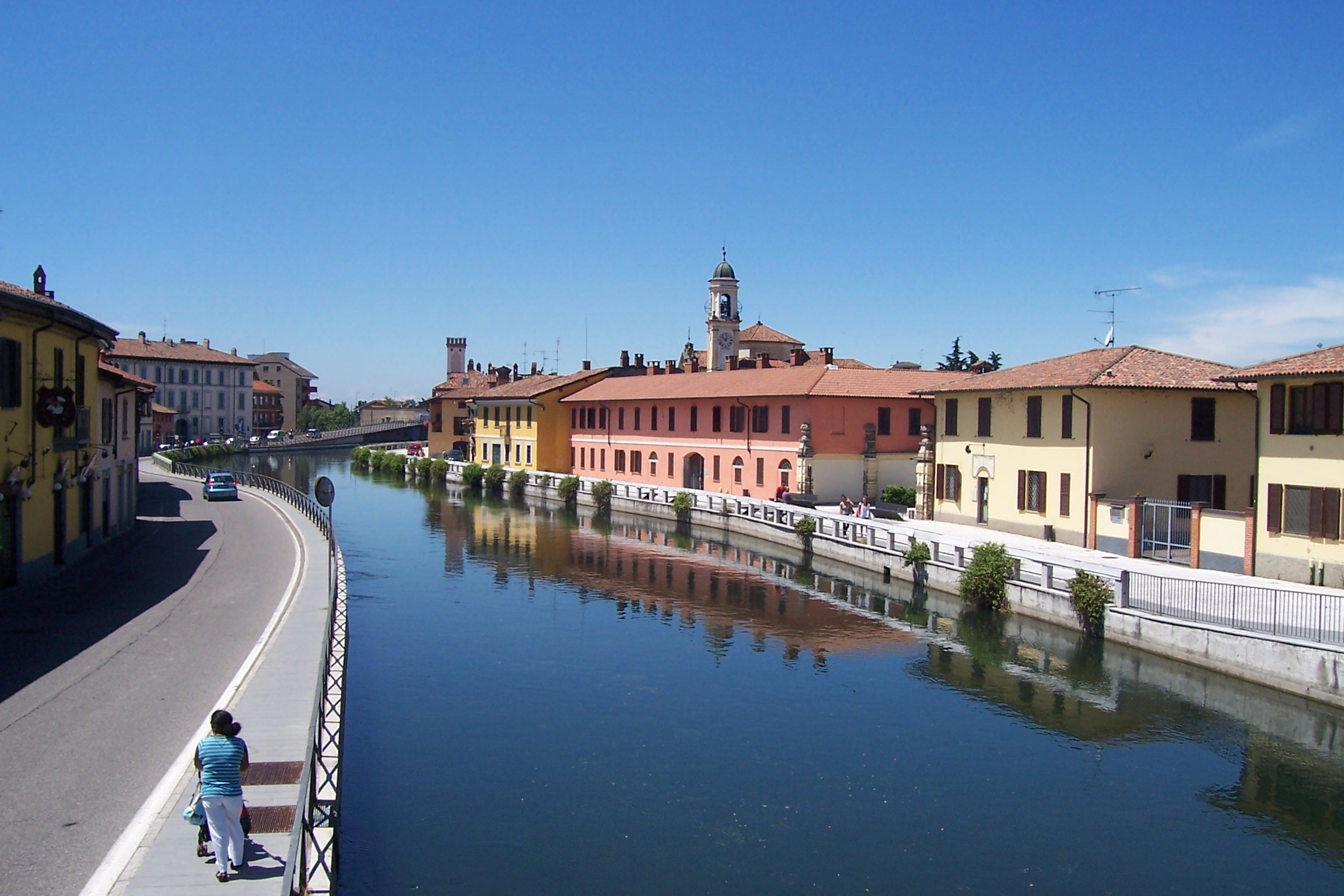
The Naviglio Grande in Gaggiano, a municipality in the metropolitan city of Milan. The tourist navigation service of the Naviglio Grande is active for it

The hydrography of Milan and the area of the neighboring municipalities is particularly complex, due to both natural causes and issues related to the work of canalization and diversion of waterways made by man, having their beginning during the Roman era, which led to the creation of numerous irrigation ditches, canals and lakes.

The territory of Milan is very rich in water, given that the city is on the "fontanili line", where there is an encounter, underground, between geological layers with different permeability, a situation that allows deep waters to resurface, especially in the south-west area of Milan, where the composition of the ground together with the groundwater level allows it to rise. The first description of the hydrography of Milan was made by Bonvesin de la Riva, an Italian writer and poet who lived between the thirteenth and fourteenth centuries.

The most important waterways affecting Milan and its metropolitan area are the Lambro, Olona and Seveso rivers, the Bozzente, Garbogera, Lura, Merlata and Pudiga rivers, the navigable canals Naviglio della Martesana, Naviglio Grande, Naviglio Pavese, Naviglio di Bereguardo, Naviglio di Paderno and Vettabbia, and the artificial waterways Canale Ticinello, Canale Vetra, Cavo Redefossi, Cavo Ticinello and Southern Lambro. In Milan there are also two important artificial basins, the Darsena di Porta Ticinese and the Idroscalo of Milan.

Among the noteworthy architectures connected to them, there are several navigation basins (including the Conca dell'Incoronata, the Conca di Viarenna, the Conca Fallata and the Conchetta), some water mills (including Molino Dorino and Mulino Vettabbia ) and the Gabelle bridge.

== Territory ==
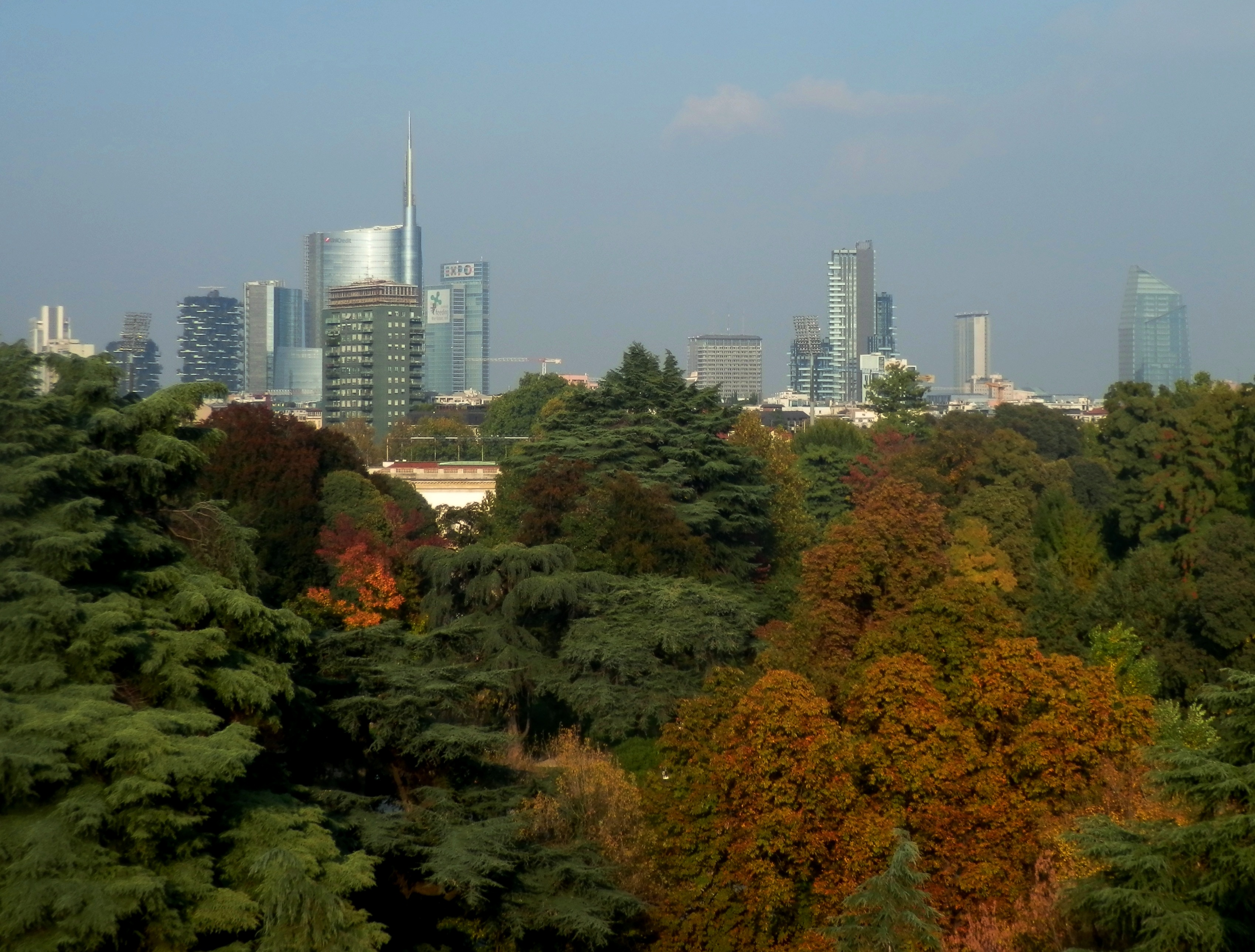
Panorama of Milan and the Sempione Park in October.

Milan rests on a single type of soil of fluvio-glacial origin with carbonate cement, common to the whole Po Valley. The main characteristic is that of being easily karst. This rock is covered by Quaternary river sediments and is visible along the main rivers, forming conglomerates which in Lombardy are known as "strains".

== Generality ==
The rivers belonging to the Milanese hydrography (starting from the east and going counterclockwise) are the Lambro, the Naviglio della Martesana, the Seveso, the Olona-Lambro Meridionale axis, the Naviglio Grande and the Naviglio Pavese: together the five streams form the backbone of the entire water system that flows south-east.

To the south of Milan are the three city treatment plants (from east to west: Peschiera Borromeo, Milan Nosedo and Milan San Rocco) which treat the wastewater of the Lombard metropolis, and the different canals whose waters, after having irrigated the plain, have final delivery the Po. To the north, to cut the Upper Milanese horizontally intersecting the Ticino and the Adda, the Villoresi Canal flows.

On the municipal territory of Milan there is also an extensive network of natural and artificial waterways that have been inherited from the past, whose overall development is 370 kilometers. Most of these small streams flow into covered riverbeds. Of these, about 200 kilometers, concern the network of main or secondary waterways; the smaller ones measure a total of about 170 km, which are often fed directly or indirectly from the aquifer of Milan.

The first description of the hydrography of the Lombard city of Milan was made by Bonvesin de la Riva, an Italian writer and poet who lived between the thirteenth and fourteenth centuries.
