= Saint-Denis-du-Béhélan =

- Part of Marbois
- Location of Saint-Denis-du-Béhélan
- Location within France Location within Normandy
- Coordinates: 48°52′33″N 0°55′57″E
- Country: France
- Region: Normandy
- Department: Eure
- Arrondissement: Bernay
- Canton: Breteuil
- Commune: Marbois
- Area^{1}: 9.55 km^{2} (3.69 sq mi)
- Elevation: 185 m (607 ft)
- Highest elevation: 186 m (610 ft)
- Lowest elevation: 172 m (564 ft)
- Population (2018): 193
  - Density: 20.2/km^{2} (52.3/sq mi)
- Time zone: UTC+01:00 (CET)
  - Summer (DST): UTC+02:00 (CEST)
- Postal code: 27160
- ^{1} French Land Register data, which excludes lakes, ponds, glaciers > 1 km^{2} (0.386 sq mi or 247 acres) and river estuaries.

Saint-Denis-du-Béhélan (French pronunciation: [sɛ̃ dəni dy be.elɑ̃]) is a former commune in the Eure department in Normandy in northern France. On 1 January 2016, it was merged into the new commune of Marbois.

== See also ==
- Communes of the Eure department
