= Les Essarts, Eure =

Les Essarts
- Part of Marbois
- Coat of arms
- Location of Les Essarts
- Location within France Location within Normandy
- Coordinates: 48°52′57″N 0°59′10″E
- Country: France
- Region: Normandy
- Department: Eure
- Arrondissement: Bernay
- Canton: Verneuil-sur-Avre
- Commune: Marbois
- Area^{1}: 15.18 km^{2} (5.86 sq mi)
- Elevation: 172 m (564 ft)
- Highest elevation: 182 m (597 ft)
- Lowest elevation: 152 m (499 ft)
- Population (2018): 438
  - Density: 28.9/km^{2} (74.7/sq mi)
- Time zone: UTC+01:00 (CET)
  - Summer (DST): UTC+02:00 (CEST)
- Postal code: 27240
- ^{1} French Land Register data, which excludes lakes, ponds, glaciers > 1 km^{2} (0.386 sq mi or 247 acres) and river estuaries.

Les Essarts (French pronunciation: [lez‿esaʁ]) is a former commune in Eure, a department in Normandy, a northern region of France. On 1 January 2016, it was merged into the new commune of Marbois.

== See also ==
- Communes of the Eure department
