= Elio Augusto Di Carlo =

Italian ornithologist

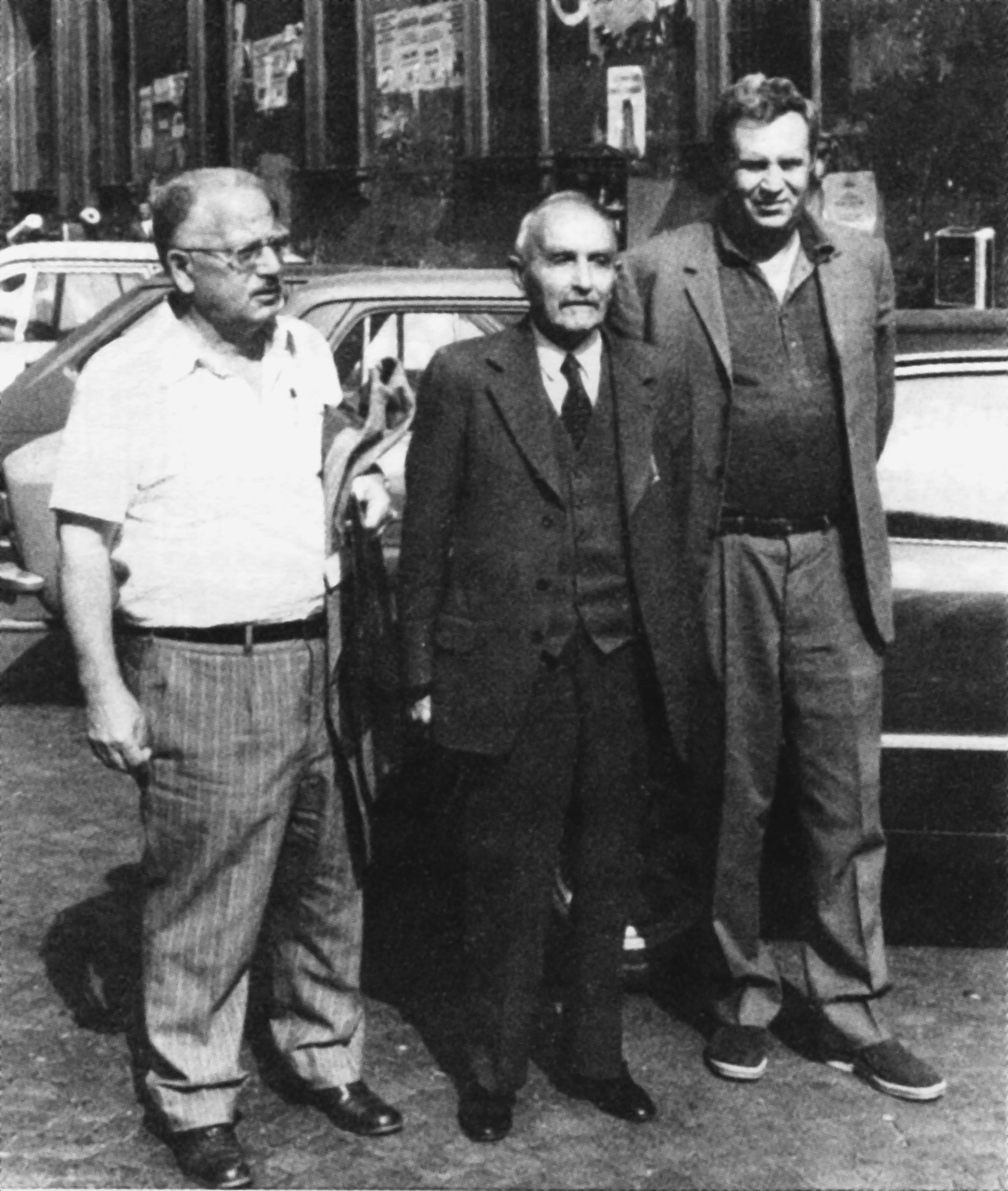
Augusto Di Carlo

Elio Augusto Di Carlo (2 September 1918, Amatrice, Italy – 27 July 1998, Cantalupo in Sabina, Italy) was an Italian ornithologist, historian and physician. He was one of the co-founders of the Italian Ornithological Society.
