= Marbois =

- Commune
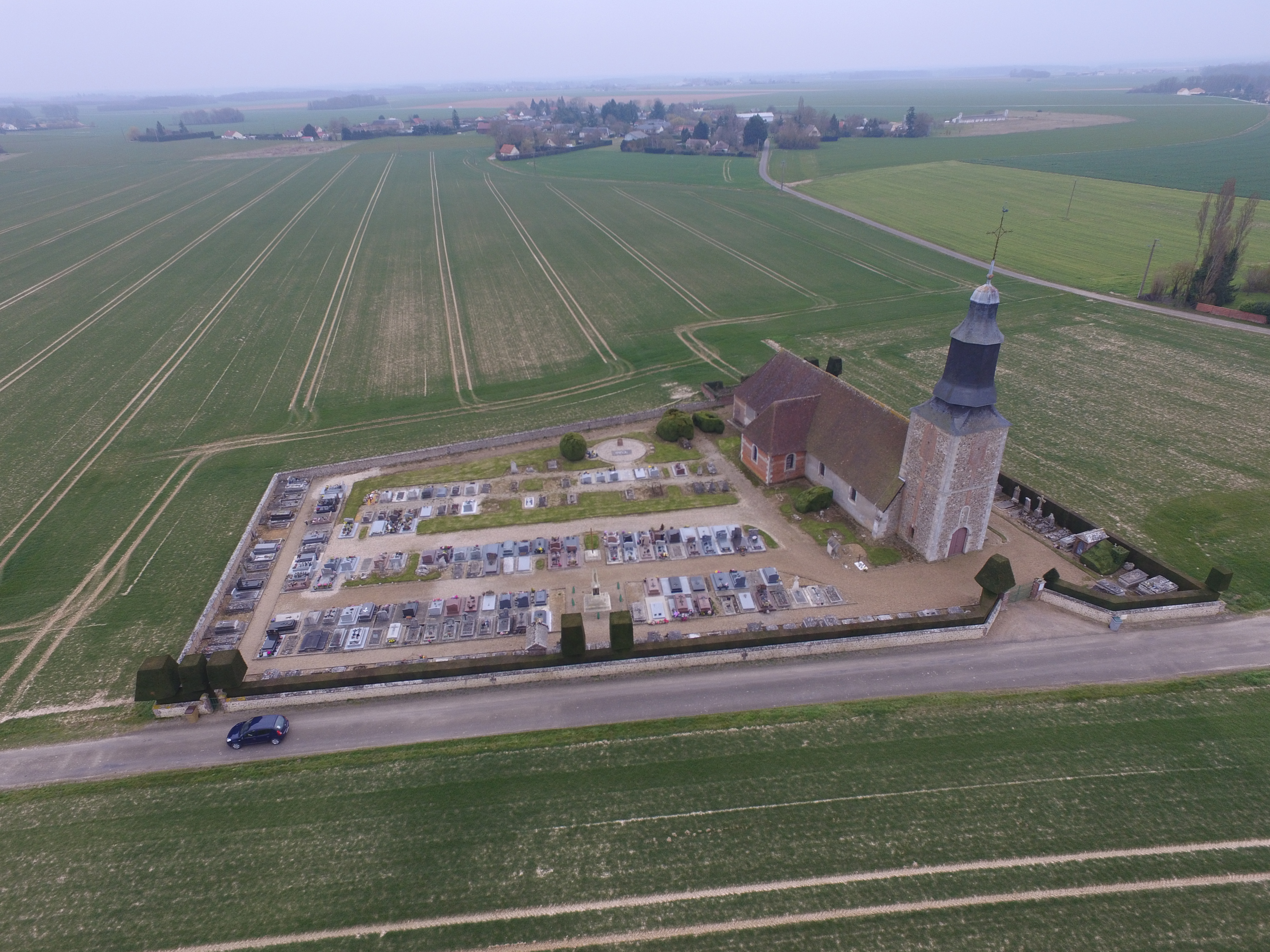
- The church in Les Essarts, in Marbois
- Location of Marbois
- Location within France Location within Normandy
- Coordinates: 48°53′31″N 0°56′56″E
- Country: France
- Region: Normandy
- Department: Eure
- Arrondissement: Bernay
- Canton: Breteuil

Government
  - Mayor (2020–2026): Éric Wohlschlegel
- Area^{1}: 46.54 km^{2} (17.97 sq mi)
- Population (2023): 1,320
  - Density: 28.4/km^{2} (73.5/sq mi)
- Time zone: UTC+01:00 (CET)
  - Summer (DST): UTC+02:00 (CEST)
- INSEE/Postal code: 27157 /27160, 27240
- ^{1} French Land Register data, which excludes lakes, ponds, glaciers > 1 km^{2} (0.386 sq mi or 247 acres) and river estuaries.

Marbois (French pronunciation: [maʁbwa]) is a commune in the department of Eure, northern France. The municipality was established on 1 January 2016 by merger of the former communes of Chanteloup, Le Chesne (the seat), Les Essarts and Saint-Denis-du-Béhélan. The merging of the towns swelled the size of the population from 591 in 2013 to 1,326 in 2019.

In 2022 the town commissioned the construction of a town stadium next to the local school. This was accompanied by the planting of hedge-rows to increase biodiversity.

== See also ==
- Communes of the Eure department
