= Chanteloup =

Chanteloup may refer to several communes in France:

- Chanteloup, Eure, in the Eure département
- Chanteloup, Ille-et-Vilaine, in the Ille-et-Vilaine département
- Chanteloup, Manche, in the Manche département
- Chanteloup, Deux-Sèvres, in the Deux-Sèvres département
- Chanteloup-en-Brie, in the Seine-et-Marne département
- Chanteloup-les-Bois, in the Maine-et-Loire département
- Chanteloup-les-Vignes, in the Yvelines département

It may also refer to:

- Château de Chanteloup, a former château in the Indre-et-Loire département
