= Bonnières, Pas-de-Calais =

Bonnières
- Commune
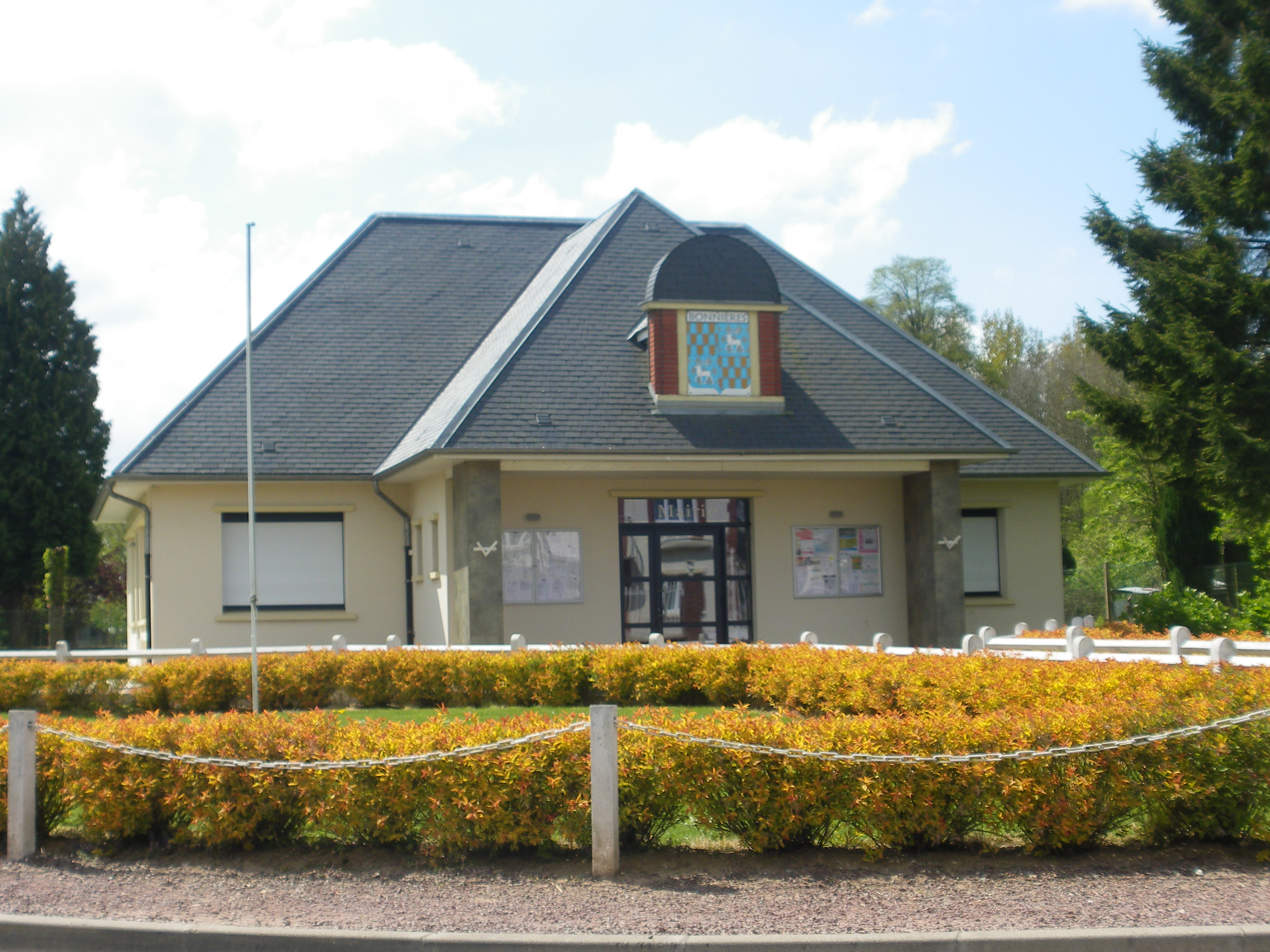
- The town hall of Bonnières

- Coat of arms
- Location of Bonnières
- Location within France Location within Hauts-de-France
- Coordinates: 50°14′42″N 2°15′40″E
- Country: France
- Region: Hauts-de-France
- Department: Pas-de-Calais
- Arrondissement: Arras
- Canton: Saint-Pol-sur-Ternoise
- Intercommunality: CC Ternois

Government
  - Mayor (2020–2026): Jean-Luc Fay
- Area^{1}: 27.16 km^{2} (10.49 sq mi)
- Elevation: 152 m (499 ft)
- Highest elevation: 156 m (512 ft)
- Lowest elevation: 54 m (177 ft)
- Population (2023): 659
  - Density: 24.3/km^{2} (62.8/sq mi)
- Time zone: UTC+01:00 (CET)
  - Summer (DST): UTC+02:00 (CEST)
- INSEE/Postal code: 62154 /62270
- ^{1} French Land Register data, which excludes lakes, ponds, glaciers > 1 km^{2} (0.386 sq mi or 247 acres) and river estuaries.

Bonnières (French pronunciation: [bɔnjɛʁ]) is a commune in the Pas-de-Calais department in the Hauts-de-France region in northern France. On 1 January 2019, the former commune Canteleux was merged into Bonnières.

== Geography ==
A farming village located 26 miles (41 km) west of Arras at the junction of the D115 and D114 roads.

== History ==
During World War II, Bonnières was subjected to heavy Allied bombing, as the Germans had built a launch site for their V1 rockets within the commune. The village was badly damaged, but not one missile was ever launched successfully

== Population ==
Historical population
Year	Pop.	±% p.a.
1968	792	—
1975	733	−1.10%
1982	694	−0.78%
1990	664	−0.55%
1999	624	−0.69%
2007	631	+0.14%
2012	666	+1.09%
2017	674	+0.24%
2023	659	−0.37%
Source: INSEE

== Sights ==
- The church of St. Aubin, rebuilt in 1960 after the destruction of the village during World War II.

== See also ==
- Communes of the Pas-de-Calais department
