= Santa Maria Assunta in Cielo, Cantalupo in Sabina =

Church in Cantalupo in Sabina, Italy

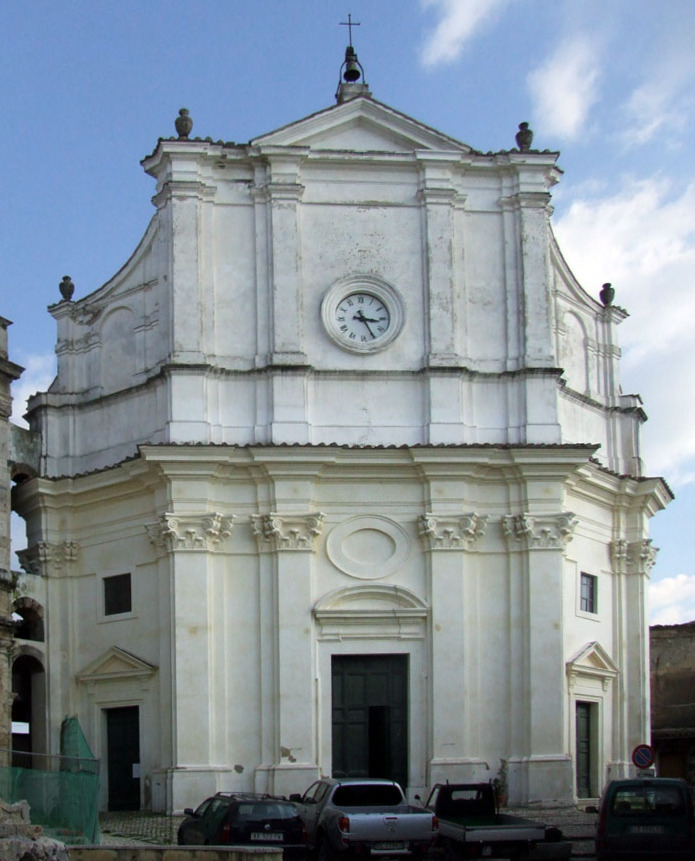
Facade of church

Santa Maria Assunta in Cielo is a Baroque-style, Roman Catholic church in the town of Cantalupo in Sabina, in the province of Rieti, region of Lazio, Italy. It is the main parish church in Cantalupo.

== History ==
This 17th-century church was built under the patronage of the Ricci family, whose coat of arms is on the base of the main altar. The oval plan with a semicircular apse is attributed to Francesco Rosa (architect) and Carlo Fontana. The interior has rich baroque marble decoration, and a 1753 canvas as a main altarpiece depicting the Assumption of the Virgin with Saint Blaise.
