= Luisago =

Luisago Luisagh (Lombard)
- Comune
- Comune di Luisago
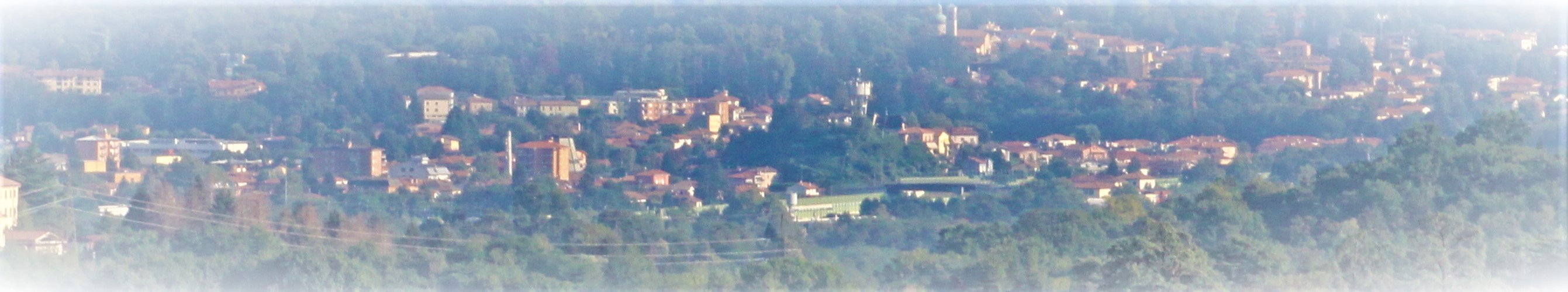

- Location within Italy Location within Lombardy
- Coordinates: 45°46′N 9°3′E
- Country: Italy
- Region: Lombardy
- Province: Province of Como (CO)

Area
  - Total: 2.1 km^{2} (0.81 sq mi)

Population (Dec. 2004)
  - Total: 2,532
  - Density: 1,200/km^{2} (3,100/sq mi)
- Demonym: Luisaghesi
- Time zone: UTC+1 (CET)
  - Summer (DST): UTC+2 (CEST)
- Postal code: 22070
- Dialing code: 031
- Website: Official website

Luisago (Brianzöö: Luisagh [lyi̯ˈzaːk]) is a comune (municipality) in the Province of Como in the Italian region Lombardy, located about 35 kilometres (22 mi) northwest of Milan and about 6 kilometres (4 mi) southwest of Como. As of 31 December 2004, it had a population of 2,532 and an area of 2.1 km^{2} (1 sq mi).

Luisago borders the following municipalities: Casnate con Bernate, Cassina Rizzardi, Fino Mornasco, Grandate, Villa Guardia.

== Demographic evolution ==
Historical population

Year	Pop.	±%
1861	495	—
1871	513	+3.6%
1881	485	−5.5%
1901	532	+9.7%
1911	520	−2.3%

Year	Pop.	±%
1921	662	+27.3%
1931	951	+43.7%
1936	1,067	+12.2%
1951	1,265	+18.6%
1961	1,473	+16.4%

Year	Pop.	±%
1971	1,819	+23.5%
1981	1,920	+5.6%
1991	2,111	+9.9%
2001	2,368	+12.2%

Source: Data from ISTAT
