= Chanteloup, Eure =

Chanteloup
- Part of Marbois
- Location of Chanteloup
- Location within France Location within Normandy
- Coordinates: 48°52′58″N 1°01′45″E
- Country: France
- Region: Normandy
- Department: Eure
- Arrondissement: Évreux
- Canton: Verneuil-sur-Avre
- Commune: Marbois
- Area^{1}: 4.2 km^{2} (1.6 sq mi)
- Elevation: 164 m (538 ft)
- Highest elevation: 173 m (568 ft)
- Lowest elevation: 149 m (489 ft)
- Population (2018): 96
  - Density: 23/km^{2} (59/sq mi)
- Time zone: UTC+01:00 (CET)
  - Summer (DST): UTC+02:00 (CEST)
- Postal code: 27240
- ^{1} French Land Register data, which excludes lakes, ponds, glaciers > 1 km^{2} (0.386 sq mi or 247 acres) and river estuaries.

Chanteloup (French pronunciation: [ʃɑ̃tlu]) is a former commune in the Eure department in northern France. On 1 January 2016, it was merged into the new commune of Marbois.

== See also ==
- Communes of the Eure department
