= Grandate =

Grandate Grandàa (Lombard)
- Comune
- Comune di Grandate
- Coat of arms

- Location within Italy Location within Lombardy
- Coordinates: 45°47′N 9°4′E
- Country: Italy
- Region: Lombardy
- Province: Como (CO)

Government
  - Mayor: Alberto Peverelli (Con Grandate)

Area
  - Total: 2.830 km^{2} (1.093 sq mi)

Population (1 January 2024)Since the 2001 census, the recorded population has been in decline, with a recent piece of small growth.
  - Total: 2,844
  - Density: 1,005/km^{2} (2,603/sq mi)
- Demonym: Grandatesi
- Time zone: UTC+1 (CET)
  - Summer (DST): UTC+2 (CEST)
- Postal code: 22070
- Dialing code: 031
- Patron saint: Saint Benedict
- Website: https://www.comune.grandate.co.it/

Grandate (Comasco: Grandàa [ɡrãˈdaː]) is a comune (municipality) in the Province of Como in the Italian region Lombardy, located about 35 kilometres (22 mi) north of Milan and about 4 kilometres (2 mi) southwest of Como, having only become a part of the Province of Como in 1808.

Grandate borders the following municipalities: Casnate con Bernate, Como, Luisago, Montano Lucino, Villa Guardia.

== Twin towns ==
Grandate is twinned with:

- Pocé-sur-Cisse, Indre-et-Loire, France
