= Licinio =

Licinio or Licínio is both a surname and a given name. Notable people with the name include:

Surname

- Bernardino Licinio (1489–1565), Italian High Renaissance painter of Venice and Lombardy
- Giovanni Antonio Licinio the younger (1515–76), Italian painter
- Giulio Licinio (16th century), Italian painter of the Renaissance period
- Julio Licinio (born before 1982), Brazilian-born physician-investigator in Canberra, Australia

Given name

- Licínio Pereira da Silva (before 1973 – 2008), Portuguese political prisoner
- Licínio Rangel (1936–2002), bishop of the Catholic Church from Campos, Brazil
- Licinio Refice (1883–1954), Italian composer and priest

== See also ==
- Licínio de Almeida, a municipality in the state of Bahia in the North-East region of Brazil
- Licinius, (c. 263–325), Roman emperor
