= Canteleux =

- Part of Bonnières
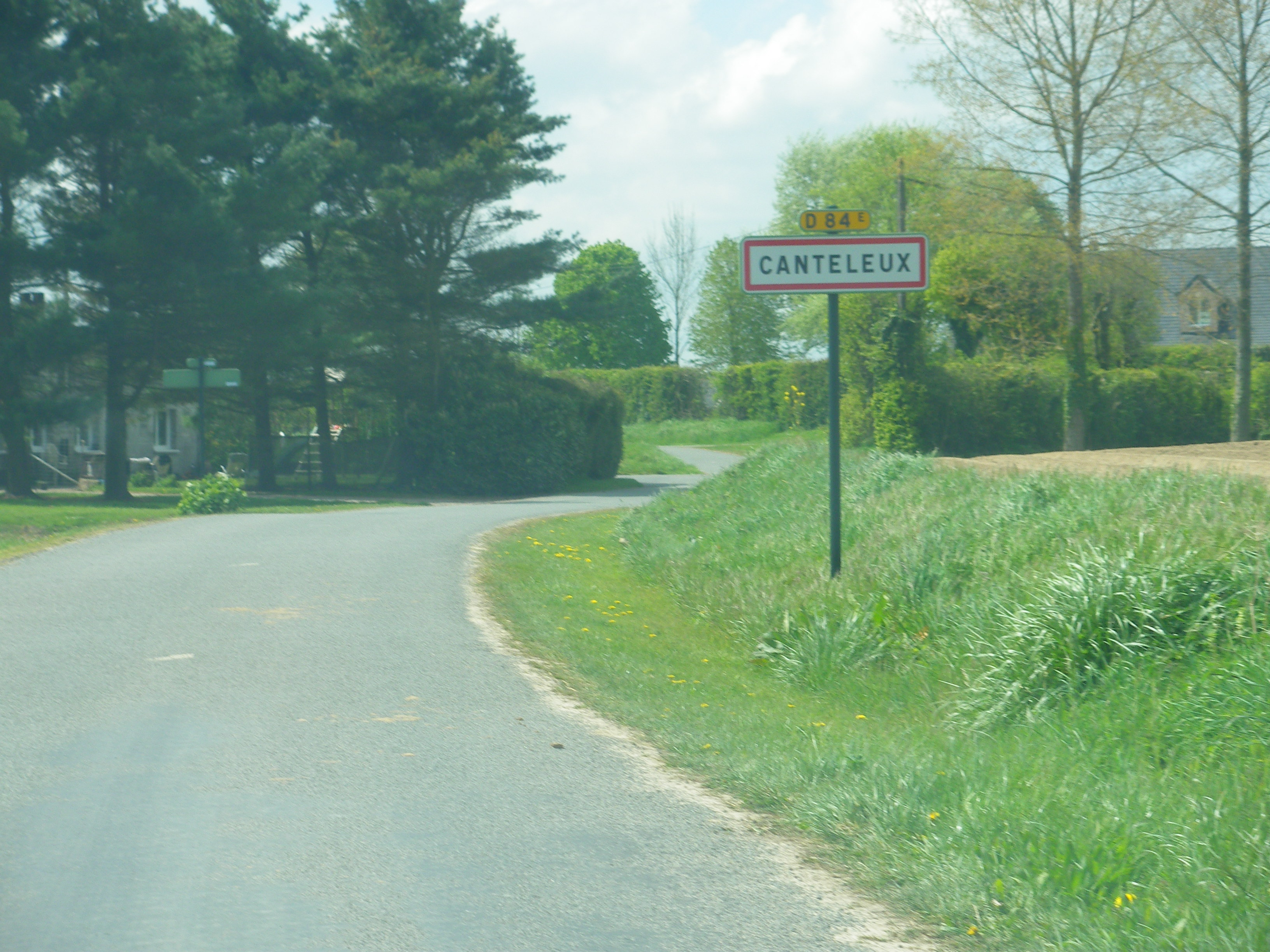
- The road into Canteleux

- Coat of arms
- Location of Canteleux
- Location within France Location within Hauts-de-France
- Coordinates: 50°12′57″N 2°18′30″E
- Country: France
- Region: Hauts-de-France
- Department: Pas-de-Calais
- Arrondissement: Arras
- Canton: Saint-Pol-sur-Ternoise
- Commune: Bonnières
- Area^{1}: 3.4 km^{2} (1.3 sq mi)
- Elevation: 147 m (482 ft)
- Highest elevation: 156 m (512 ft)
- Lowest elevation: 95 m (312 ft)
- Population (2016): 15
  - Density: 4.4/km^{2} (11/sq mi)
- Time zone: UTC+01:00 (CET)
  - Summer (DST): UTC+02:00 (CEST)
- Postal code: 62270
- ^{1} French Land Register data, which excludes lakes, ponds, glaciers > 1 km^{2} (0.386 sq mi or 247 acres) and river estuaries.

Canteleux (French pronunciation: [kɑ̃tlø]) is a former commune in the Pas-de-Calais department in the Hauts-de-France region of France. On 1 January 2019, it was merged into the commune Bonnières. Before, it was the least populous commune in the department.

== Geography ==
It is located 23 miles (37 km) west of Arras on the D84E1, which forms part of the border with the Somme department.

== Population ==
Historical population
Year	Pop.	±% p.a.
1962	31	—
1968	27	−2.28%
1975	25	−1.09%
1982	17	−5.36%
1990	18	+0.72%
1999	17	−0.63%
2016	15	−0.73%
Source: EHESS and INSEE

== See also ==
- Communes of the Pas-de-Calais department
