= Cantalupo in Sabina =

- Comune
- Comune di Cantalupo in Sabina
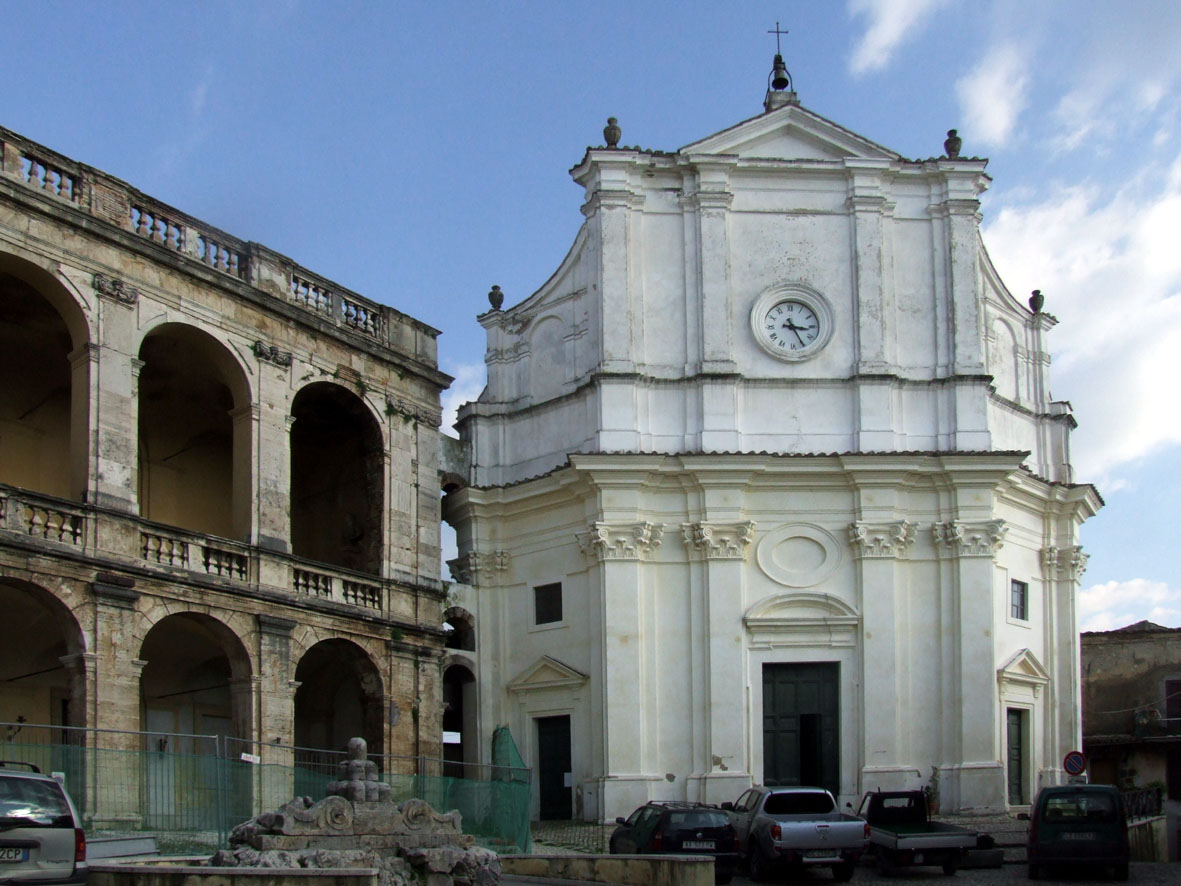
- Church Maria Santissima Assunta in Cantalupo in Sabina

- Location within Italy Location within Lazio
- Coordinates: 42°18′N 12°39′E
- Country: Italy
- Region: Lazio
- Province: Rieti (RI)

Government
  - Mayor: Paolo Rinalduzzi (since May 2014)

Area
  - Total: 10 km^{2} (3.9 sq mi)
- Elevation: 297 m (974 ft)

Population (2001)
  - Total: 1,621
  - Density: 160/km^{2} (420/sq mi)
- Demonym: Cantalupani
- Time zone: UTC+1 (CET)
  - Summer (DST): UTC+2 (CEST)
- Postal code: 02040
- Dialing code: 0765
- Patron saint: St. Blaise
- Saint day: February 3
- Website: Official website

Cantalupo in Sabina (Sabino: Candalupu) is a town and comune in the province of Rieti, on the Sabine Hills of Lazio. It is famous as the reputed origin of the melon called a cantaloupe melon.

It is one of several Italian comuni named "Cantalupo" ("song of the wolf" or "howl of the wolf" or literally "sings wolf") and it seems that these place names are due to an elevated presence of wolves at the time of their naming (probably because wolves could be heard howling, but this etymology is actually disputed nowadays).

== History ==
Cantalupo in Imperial Roman times housed a scattering of villas, one belonging to the Tullii, the family of the orator Marcus Tullius Cicero, but in the Migrations period the inhabitants were protected by a walled castle at the high point of a rocky spur, which was in possession of the counts of Cuneo. Cantalupo was not mentioned however, until an 11th-century register reported the walled village as a possession of the abbots of Farfa. Though in 1278 the commune's representatives swore fealty to the Papacy, its borderlands position in the marches of Lazio (governed from Rome) and Umbria, Cantalupo passed from one feudatory lord to another.

The rocca commanding the town was expanded into a residence for the counts of Sant'Eustachio in the 13th and 14th centuries, and then passed to the Savelli family in the 15th century before it was further enlarged by a series of successive holders of the feodo. The site is now privately owned.

In the Papal States, Cantalupo was governed by a direct representative of the Apostolic Camera.

Among the landmark buildings is the baroque church of Santa Maria Assunta in Cielo.

== Notable persons ==
- Elio Augusto Di Carlo (1918–1998) Italian ornithologist, historian and physician.

== See also ==
- Cantalupo nel Sannio (Molise)
- Cantalupo Ligure (province of Alessandria, Piedmont)
- Cantalupo di Bevagna (Umbria)
