= Casnate con Bernate =

Casnate con Bernate Casnaa Bernaa
- Comune
- Comune di Casnate con Bernate
- Location within Italy Location within Lombardy
- Coordinates: 45°45′N 09°04′E
- Country: Italy
- Region: Lombardy
- Province: Province of Como (CO)

Government
  - Mayor: Anna Seregni

Area
  - Total: 5.3 km^{2} (2.0 sq mi)
- Elevation: 342 m (1,122 ft)

Population (January 1, 2010)
  - Total: 4,908
  - Density: 930/km^{2} (2,400/sq mi)
- Demonym: Casnatesi
- Time zone: UTC+1 (CET)
  - Summer (DST): UTC+2 (CEST)
- Postal code: 22070
- Dialing code: 031
- Patron saint: Anthony the Great
- Saint day: 17 January
- Website: Official website

Casnate con Bernate (Brianzöö: Casnaa Bernaa [kaˈznaː berˈnaː]) is a comune (municipality) in the Province of Como in the Italian region Lombardy, about 30 kilometres (19 mi) north of Milan and about 5 kilometres (3 mi) south of Como. As of 1 January 2010, it had a population of 4,908 and an area of 5.3 square kilometres (2.0 mi^{2}).
It comprises the fractions of Casnate and Bernate, which once were distinct municipalities until they were merged in July 1937.

Casnate con Bernate borders the following municipalities: Como, Cucciago, Fino Mornasco, Grandate, Luisago, Senna Comasco.

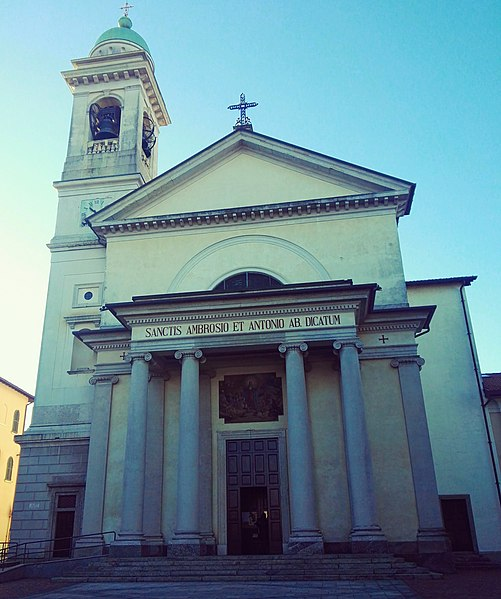

== Demographic evolution ==
Historical population

Year	Pop.	±%
1861	1,197	—
1871	1,366	+14.1%
1881	1,342	−1.8%
1901	1,331	−0.8%
1911	1,434	+7.7%

Year	Pop.	±%
1921	1,397	−2.6%
1931	1,375	−1.6%
1936	1,481	+7.7%
1951	1,685	+13.8%
1961	2,095	+24.3%

Year	Pop.	±%
1971	2,255	+7.6%
1981	3,137	+39.1%
1991	3,857	+23.0%
2001	4,382	+13.6%
2010	4,908	+12.0%

Source: Data from ISTAT
