= Le Chesne, Eure =

Le Chesne
- Part of Marbois
- Location of Le Chesne
- Location within France Location within Normandy
- Coordinates: 48°53′31″N 0°57′01″E
- Country: France
- Region: Normandy
- Department: Eure
- Arrondissement: Bernay
- Canton: Breteuil
- Commune: Marbois
- Area^{1}: 17.61 km^{2} (6.80 sq mi)
- Elevation: 185 m (607 ft)
- Highest elevation: 194 m (636 ft)
- Lowest elevation: 166 m (545 ft)
- Population (2018): 629
  - Density: 35.7/km^{2} (92.5/sq mi)
- Time zone: UTC+01:00 (CET)
  - Summer (DST): UTC+02:00 (CEST)
- Postal code: 27160
- ^{1} French Land Register data, which excludes lakes, ponds, glaciers > 1 km^{2} (0.386 sq mi or 247 acres) and river estuaries.

Le Chesne (French pronunciation: [lə ʃɛːn]) is a former commune in the Eure department in northern France. On 1 January 2016, it was merged into the new commune of Marbois.

== Population ==
Historical population
Year	Pop.	±% p.a.
1962	336	—
1968	307	−1.49%
1975	324	+0.77%
1982	335	+0.48%
1990	382	+1.65%
1999	411	+0.82%
2006	472	+2.00%
2018	629	+2.42%
Source: EHESS and INSEE

== See also ==
- Communes of the Eure department
