= Joseph Cantalupo =

Joseph "Joey" Cantalupo (born 1943) was an American Mafia associate from the Colombo Crime Family and later a government informant.

== Informant ==
Cantalupo turned informant in 1972 and was a considerable asset to the FBI in prosecuting mafia trials.

He has testified in court, written a book on his activities in organized crime and also appeared in mafia related documentaries (such as Crime Inc.) as an authority on mafia life.
