= San Fermo della Battaglia =

- Comune
- Comune di San Fermo della Battaglia
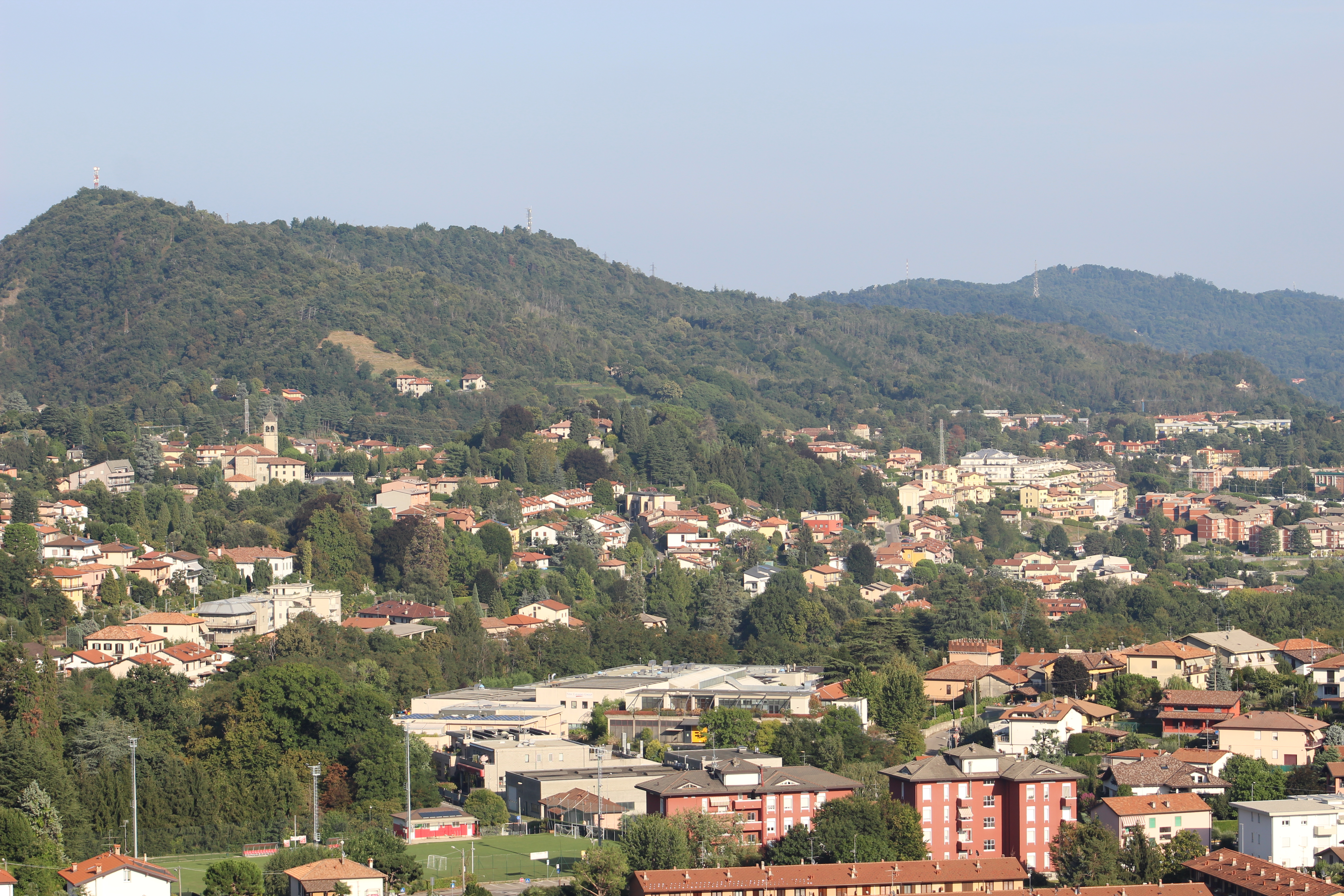

- Location within Italy Location within Lombardy
- Coordinates: 45°48′30.6″N 9°2′56.4″E
- Country: Italy
- Region: Lombardy
- Province: Province of Como (CO)
- Frazioni: Cavallasca

Area
  - Total: 3.1 km^{2} (1.2 sq mi)
- Elevation: 397 m (1,302 ft)

Population (Dec. 2004)
  - Total: 4,255
  - Density: 1,400/km^{2} (3,600/sq mi)
- Time zone: UTC+1 (CET)
  - Summer (DST): UTC+2 (CEST)
- Postal code: 22042
- Dialing code: 031
- Patron saint: Firmus
- Website: Official website

San Fermo della Battaglia is a comune (municipality) in the Province of Como in the Italian region of Lombardy, located about 40 kilometres (25 mi) north of Milan and about 3 kilometres (2 mi) southwest of Como. As of 31 December 2004, it had a population of 4,255 and an area of 3.1 square kilometres (1.2 mi^{2}).

With della Battaglia meaning "of the battle", the town is named after the battle which took place there between Garibaldi's Hunters of the Alps (Cacciatori delle Alpi) and Austrian militaries in 1859.

San Fermo della Battaglia borders the following municipalities: Como, Montano Lucino.

== Demographic evolution ==
Historical population

Year	Pop.	±%
1861	696	—
1871	804	+15.5%
1881	895	+11.3%
1901	875	−2.2%
1911	854	−2.4%

Year	Pop.	±%
1921	901	+5.5%
1931	1,045	+16.0%
1936	1,128	+7.9%
1951	1,241	+10.0%
1961	1,682	+35.5%

Year	Pop.	±%
1971	2,969	+76.5%
1981	3,485	+17.4%
1991	3,952	+13.4%
2001	4,189	+6.0%
2004	4,255	+1.6%

Source: Data from ISTAT

== Well-known personalities ==
Famous visitors from around the world are reported to reside here but prefer to remain unknown. It is also the home of film director Marco Bonfanti.
