= Monte Sasso =

Mountain in Italy

Coordinates: 45°49′08″N 9°02′29″E

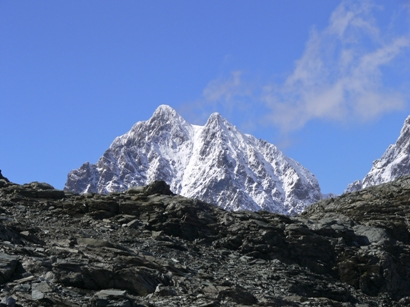

Highest point
- Elevation: 614 m (2,014 ft)

Geography
- Location: Lombardy, Italy

Monte Sasso is a mountain of Lombardy, Italy. It has an elevation of 614 metres above sea level.
