= Canteloup, Manche =

Canteloup
- Commune
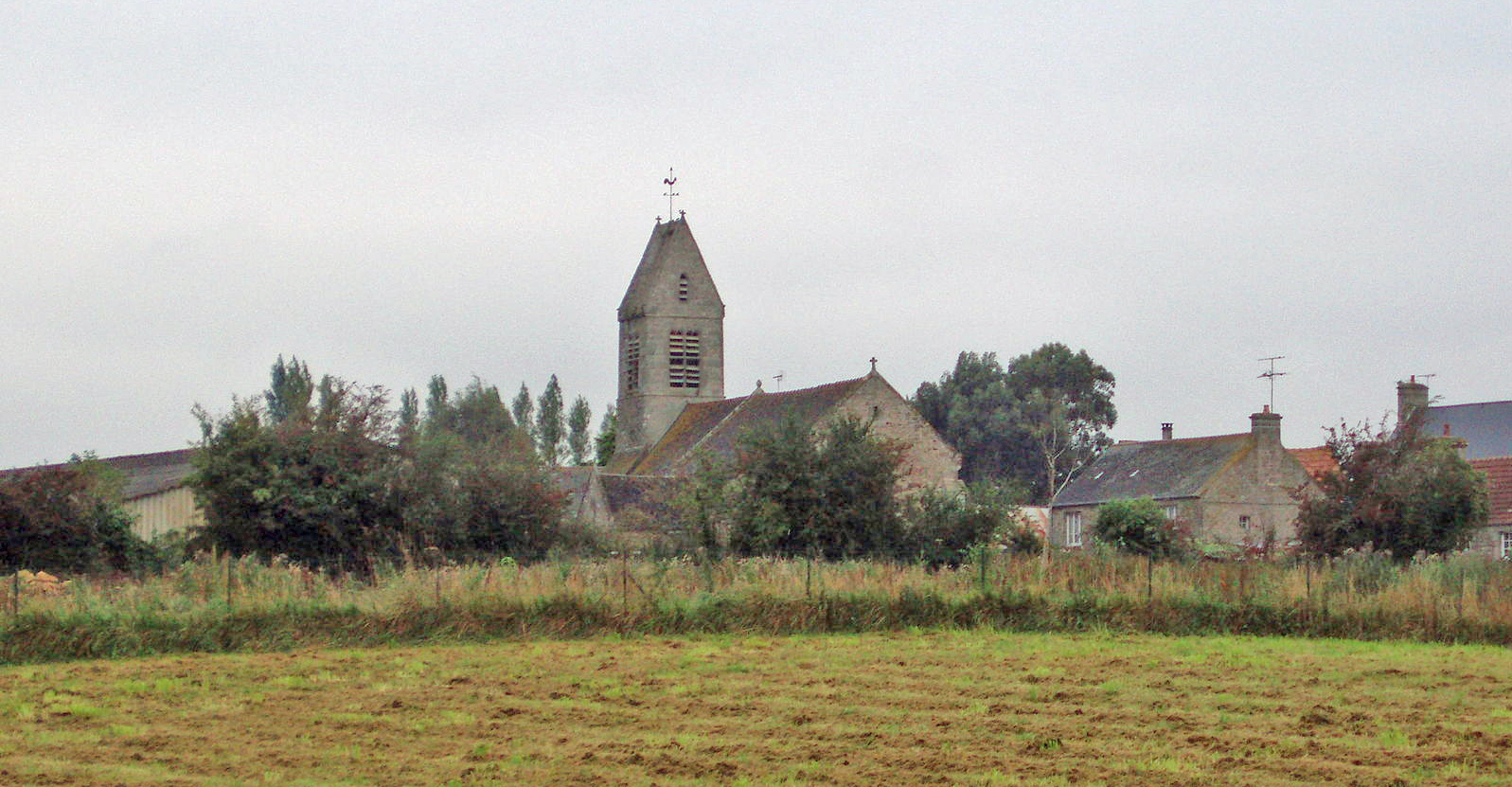
- The church of Saint-Martin
- Location of Canteloup
- Location within France Location within Normandy
- Coordinates: 49°38′47″N 1°21′03″W
- Country: France
- Region: Normandy
- Department: Manche
- Arrondissement: Cherbourg
- Canton: Val-de-Saire
- Intercommunality: CA Cotentin

Government
  - Mayor (2020–2026): Alexandrina Le Guillou
- Area^{1}: 4.28 km^{2} (1.65 sq mi)
- Elevation: 120 m (390 ft)
- Highest elevation: 124 m (407 ft)
- Lowest elevation: 55 m (180 ft)
- Population (2023): 220
  - Density: 51/km^{2} (130/sq mi)
- Demonym: Cantelouais
- Time zone: UTC+01:00 (CET)
  - Summer (DST): UTC+02:00 (CEST)
- INSEE/Postal code: 50096 /50330
- ^{1} French Land Register data, which excludes lakes, ponds, glaciers > 1 km^{2} (0.386 sq mi or 247 acres) and river estuaries.

Canteloup (French pronunciation: [kɑ̃tlu]) is a commune in the Manche department in Normandy in north-western France.

== See also ==
- Communes of the Manche department
