= Canteloup, Calvados =

Canteloup
- Commune
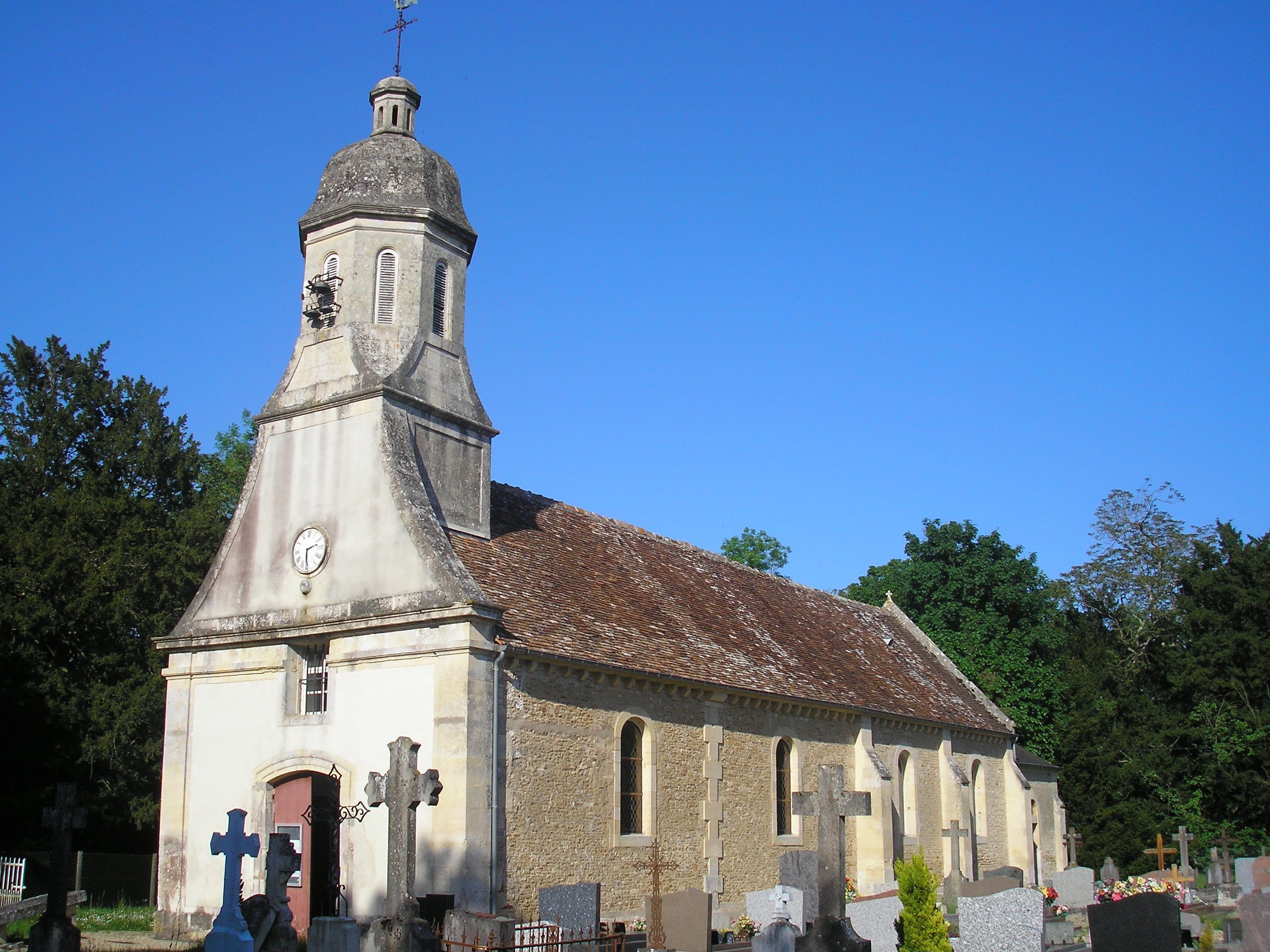
- The church in Canteloup
- Location of Canteloup
- Location within France Location within Normandy
- Coordinates: 49°08′00″N 0°07′46″W
- Country: France
- Region: Normandy
- Department: Calvados
- Arrondissement: Caen
- Canton: Troarn
- Intercommunality: CC Val ès Dunes

Government
  - Mayor (2020–2026): Sophie de Gibon
- Area^{1}: 2.32 km^{2} (0.90 sq mi)
- Elevation: 38 m (125 ft)
- Highest elevation: 44 m (144 ft)
- Lowest elevation: 24 m (79 ft)
- Population (2023): 187
  - Density: 80.6/km^{2} (209/sq mi)
- Time zone: UTC+01:00 (CET)
  - Summer (DST): UTC+02:00 (CEST)
- INSEE/Postal code: 14134 /14370
- ^{1} French Land Register data, which excludes lakes, ponds, glaciers > 1 km^{2} (0.386 sq mi or 247 acres) and river estuaries.

Canteloup (French pronunciation: [kɑ̃tlu]) is a commune in the Calvados department in the Normandy region in northwestern France.

== Population ==
Historical population
Year	Pop.	±% p.a.
1968	103	—
1975	126	+2.92%
1982	181	+5.31%
1990	180	−0.07%
1999	166	−0.90%
2007	170	+0.30%
2012	203	+3.61%
2017	179	−2.49%
2023	187	+0.73%
Source: INSEE

== See also ==
- Communes of the Calvados department
