= Cantalupo, Bevagna =

Cantalupo
- Frazione
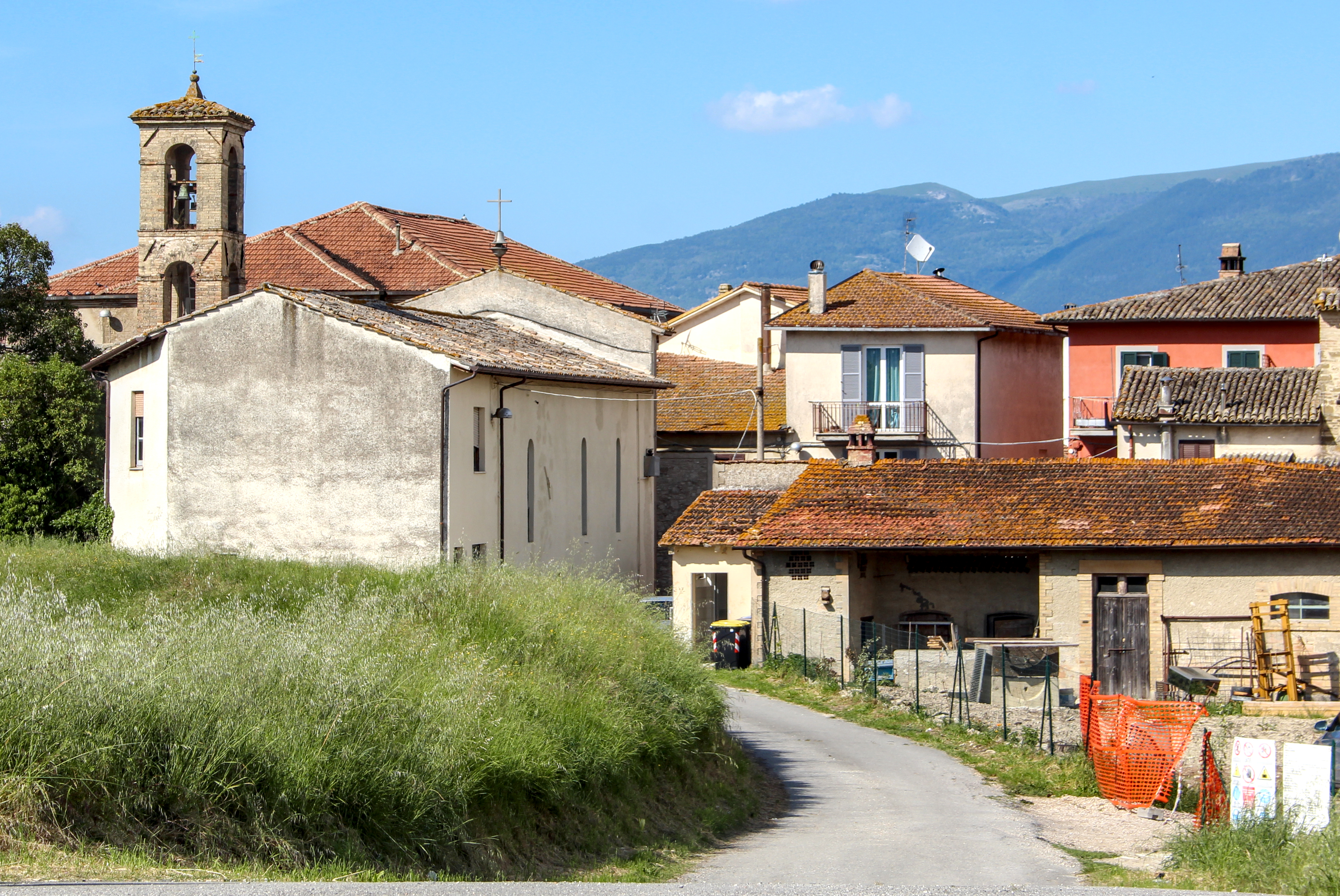
- Cantalupo

- Location within Italy
- Coordinates: 42°58′00″N 12°34′36″E
- Country: Italy
- Region: Umbria
- Province: Perugia
- Comune: Bevagna
- Elevation: 204 m (669 ft)

Population (2001)
  - Total: 332
- Time zone: UTC+1 (CET)
  - Summer (DST): UTC+2 (CEST)
- Postcode: 06031
- Area code: 0742

Cantalupo is a frazione of Bevagna in the Italian region Umbria located at an elevation of 201 m on the Torrente Attone, a tributary of the Topino River. It is a small farming community in the low alluvial plains of central Umbria; its principal crop is grapes for wine.

About 2 km north of the village is the roadside shrine of Pian d' Arca commemorating the miracle of St. Francis of Assisi and the birds.

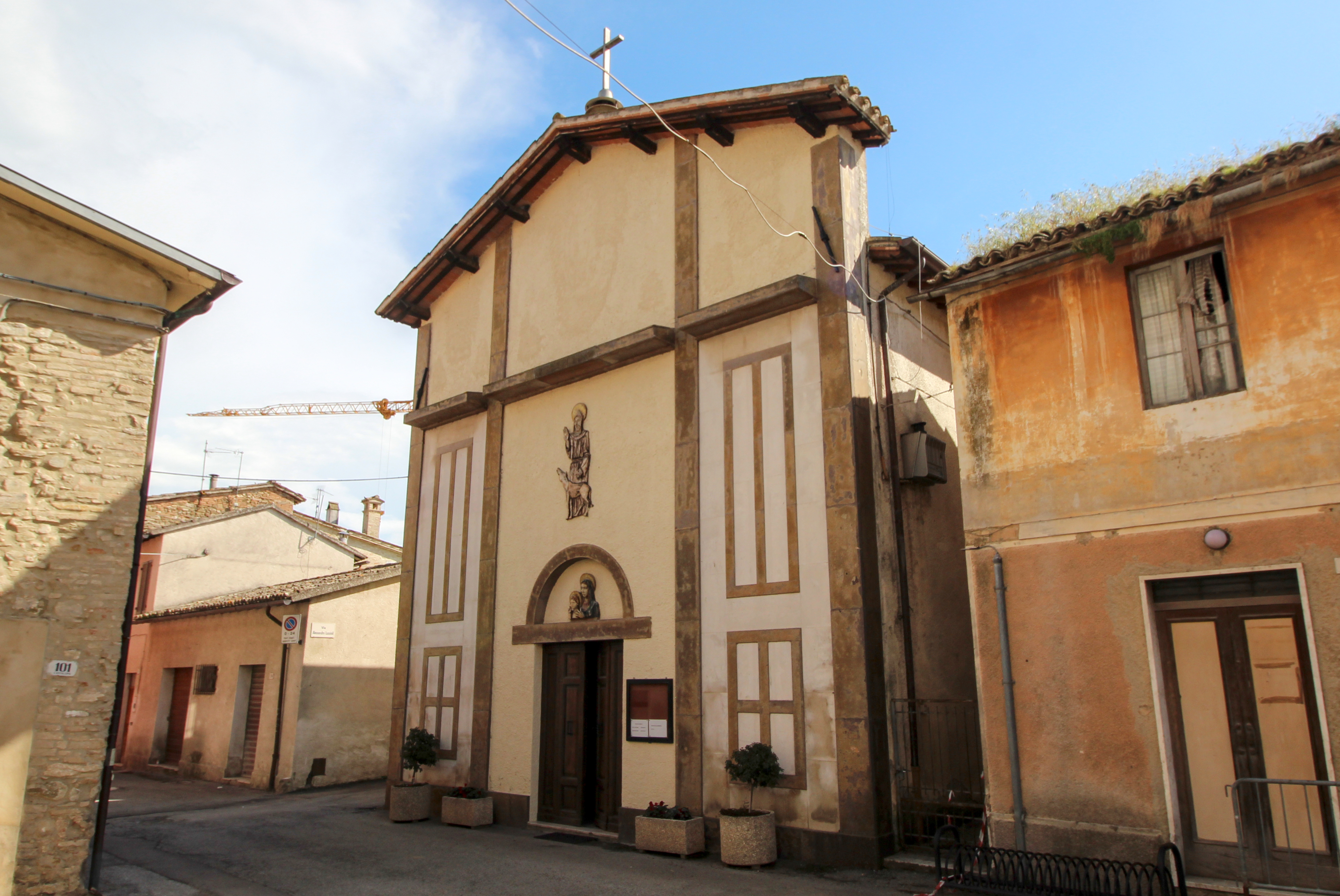
The church Santa Maria Addolorate

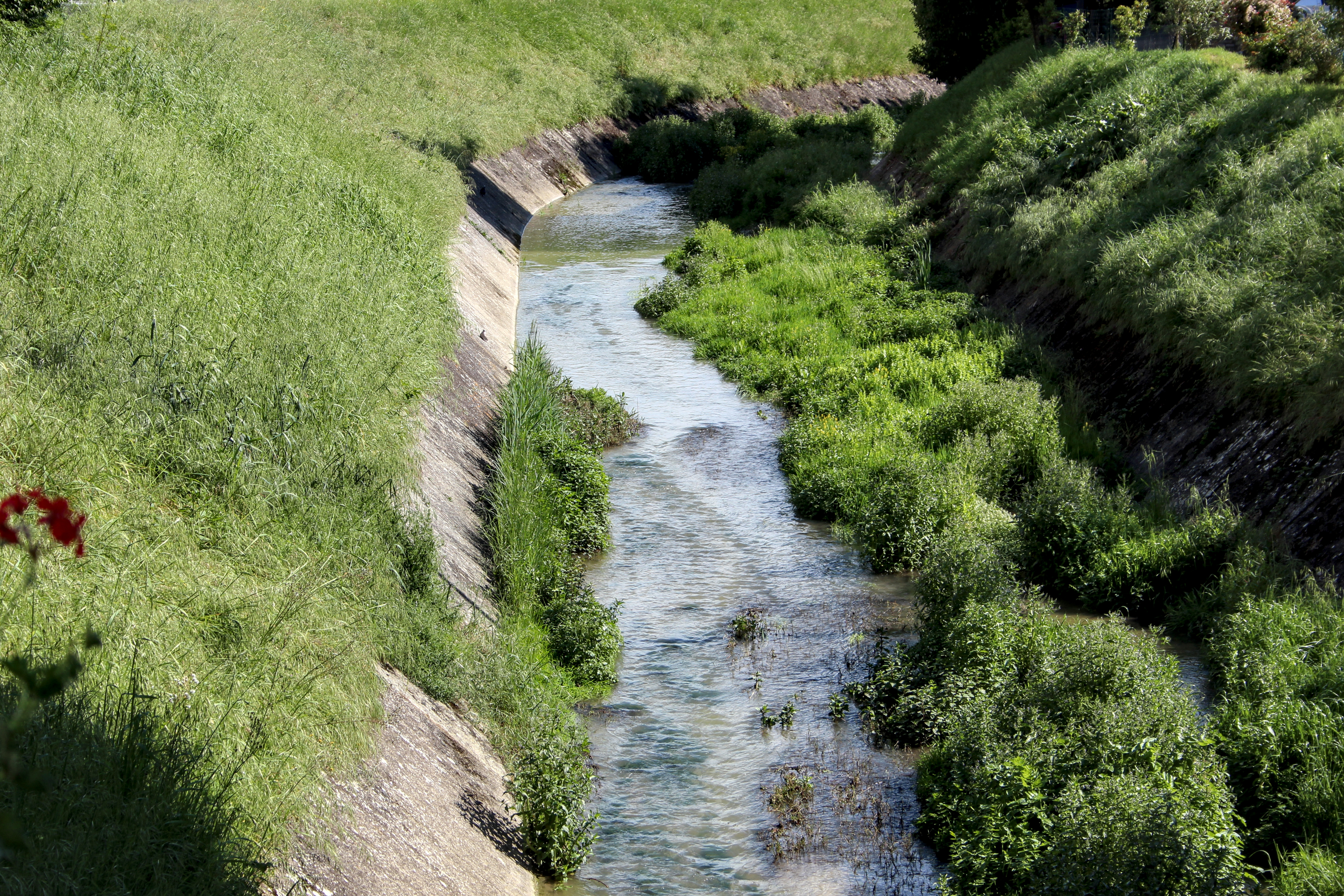
The river Attone in Cantalupo

== See also ==
- Cantalupo (disambiguation)
