= Montano Lucino =

Montano Lucino Muntàn Lüscìn (Lombard)
- Comune
- Comune di Montano Lucino

- Coat of arms

- Location within Italy Location within Lombardy
- Coordinates: 45°47′N 9°3′E
- Country: Italy
- Region: Lombardy
- Province: Como (CO)
- Frazioni: Arcissa, Cantalupo, Cima, Crignola, Dosso, Grisonno, La Cà, Lovesana, Lucinasco, Lucino al basso, Mezzomanico, Lucino al Monte, Montano, Trivino, Vitello

Government
  - Mayor: Alberto Introzzi

Area
  - Total: 5.22 km^{2} (2.02 sq mi)
- Elevation: 331 m (1,086 ft)

Population (30 November 2017)
  - Total: 5,226
  - Density: 1,000/km^{2} (2,590/sq mi)
- Demonym: Lucinesi
- Time zone: UTC+1 (CET)
  - Summer (DST): UTC+2 (CEST)
- Postal code: 22070
- Dialing code: 031
- Website: Official website

Montano Lucino (Muntàn and Lüscìn in Comasco dialect, IPA phonetic pronunciation: /mũˈtãː/ and /lyˈʃĩː/) is an Italian town of 5,302 inhabitants in the province of Como in Lombardy. It is a comune (municipality) in the Province of Como in the Italian region Lombardy, located about 35 kilometres (22 mi) north of Milan and about 5 km (3.1 mi) southwest of Como.

Montano Lucino borders the following municipalities: Cavallasca, Colverde, Como, Grandate, San Fermo della Battaglia, Villa Guardia.

== Origins of the name ==
It is believed that the name comes from Roman times: Montano derives from montanus ('mountainous'), and Lucino from lucinus (lucus, 'sacred forest') or from the personal name Licinio. In a work by Cesare Cantù, the territory of Lucino was indicated with the toponym Caneda.

== History ==
It is widely believed that the first neolithic village in the Como area (3500 B.C.) was located in the territory of Montano Lucino. Some pieces of pottery found in the area date back to this period, as well as some flints even earlier than 1500 years.

In the communal age, Lucino, which had a fortress of Gallic origin, sided with the people of Como against Milan. The fortress, probably located where the so-called Curt dei Vincenzitt is today, was razed to the ground in 1240 by the Milanese, who came into possession of the fortress following the betrayal of a certain Arialdo Advocato.

The annexes to the Statutes of Como of 1335 report the "comunia locorum de Montano de Trevino" and the "comune loci de Lucino" among the municipalities that, within the parish of Fino, had the task of ensuring the maintenance of some roads, respectively:

the "stratam de Cardevio a platea que est ad domos quondam Alberti Zanforgi usque ad Sassum de Cardevio" for the community of Montano and Trivino;

the "stratam a stricta que est prope domos de Breda a manu dextra eundo versus Torrigiam usque ad strictam Bevulcham" for the municipality of Lucino.

Also in the same parish, in 1751 the municipality of Montano already had jurisdiction over the cassinaggi of Vetello, Grisono, Grignola, Lucivosco, Cantalupo, Trivino and Dasso, while the municipality of Lucino on those of Lucino al Monte, Arcisà, Cassina La Cà and Cimiee. In particular, the aggregation to Lucino of the Cassina de Scimiè (on which the commune was dependent for religious aspects) took place that year, at the end of a long period (which began no later than 1652) in which the land of "Cimerio" had constituted an autonomous commune of the parish of Fino.

In the same period, the two communes of Montano and Lucino are found to have already redeemed themselves from the infeudation but were still subject to the fifteen-year payment related to the redemption.

Between 1756 and 1757 Montano definitively came to also include the territory of Cassina de Casarigo (also free from the infeudation), which shortly before had been aggregated to the municipality of Gironico al Monte after having formed a small municipal entity in the parish of Uggiate as early as the 16th century.

A decree of administrative reorganization of the Napoleonic Kingdom of Italy dated 1807 sanctioned for the municipality of Montano the aggregation to Gironico, while for that of Lucino the incorporation to Como. The Napoleonic decisions did not survive the Restoration, which resulted in the reconstitution of Montano and Lucino as two autonomous municipal entities.

Following the unification of Italy, in 1863 the municipality of Montano changed its name to Montano Comasco (R.D. 28 June 1863, no. 1,426).

In 1928 Montano Comasco and Lucino were united in a single municipality called Montano Lucino (R.D. 26 April 1928, n. 1086).

=== Civil architecture ===
==== Villa Olginati ====
Villa Olginati was built by the family of the same name in the hamlet of Lucinasco in the second half of the 18th century.

In the will of the family's last heir, in 1931 the structure was readapted as an orphanage. Further renovations were recorded in 1967.

Villa Gonzaga

Grisonno hosts the ruins of Villa Gonzaga (12th century), still attested in the Land Register of 1722 and surrounded by a 30-hectare park.

=== Other ===
- Palazzo Tatti, in Montano, was built between the end of the 19th century and the beginning of the 20th century.
- Villa Carabba Tettamanti (18th–19th century), in Montano
- Villa Luzzani

== Religious architecture ==
Church of Sant'Andrea

Located in the hamlet of Montano, the church of Sant'Andrea, which underwent major renovations from 1948–1950, was already mentioned as a parish church in the records of Bishop Ninguarda's pastoral visit at the end of the 16th century. The origins of the church predate the sixteenth century.

Church of San Giorgio

Located in the hamlet of Lucino, the church of San Giorgio was also originally built before the sixteenth century and is mentioned in 16th-century pastoral visit records. Rebuilt in 1674, fifteen years later the church underwent new improvements. In 1842 the church was further enlarged and a new façade was built.

=== Other ===
- Sanctuary of the Madonna delle Grazie was built in Lucino in 1359 at the bequest of the bishop of Como Andrea degli Avvocati and was subject to major renovations in 1688.
- Oratory of Villa Olginati, dedicated to the Virgin of the Assumption
- Montano cemetery chapel, decorated with stained glass windows by Alfonso Salardi.

== Culture ==
=== Events ===
- Settembrina Livestock Fair

Since 1978 this fair has been organized by the Gruppo Folcloristico di Montano Lucino in collaboration with the municipal administration. The most important of the town's events, it traditionally starts on the third Saturday of September and ends after three days, on Monday. The event is aimed at promoting the world of animal husbandry and agriculture, with exhibitions of horses, cattle breeding, and slaughter. Throughout the duration, it is possible to taste traditional Lombard dishes and products. There are also stalls and folklore shows with majorettes and musical groups.

- Pizzocchero Festival

This young festival, which caught on quickly, takes place in May and lasts two days. Typical Valtellina products are offered, and musical entertainment is provided in the evening.

- Fish Festival

The most recent of the town's events takes place in June and lasts two days. It offers typical dishes based on lake fish (misultin, pesce di lago in carpione, bleaks) and classic Italian traditional dishes such as fritto misto and pasta allo scoglio. The festival is accompanied by evening musical entertainment.

=== Infrastructure and transport ===
Crossed by the Via Varesina, (State Road 342 Briantea), between 1910 and 1955 the town was served by a stop along the tramway Como-Appiano Gentile-Mozzate. The Asf Autolinee C71 line connects Montano Lucino to Como, while the C70 line connects Lucino to Como.
