= Cantaloupe, Inc. =

American financial services company

- Formerly: USA Technologies Inc.
- Type: Public
- Traded as: Nasdaq: CTLP
- Industry: Point of sale software
- Founded: 1992; 34 years ago, in Pennsylvania, US
- Headquarters: Malvern, Pennsylvania, United States
- Key people: Sean Feeney (CEO)
- Products: ePort; ePort Mobile; ePort Online; MORE, a loyalty and Prepaid Consumer Engagement system; Quickconnect Web Services; EnergyMiser; and more
- Number of employees: 150
- Website: www.cantaloupe.com

Cantaloupe, Inc., previously known as USA Technologies Inc., is an American company known for its work with ePort cashless acceptance technology running on its patented ePort Connect service, a PCI compliant services. ePort Connect wirelessly facilitates electronic payment options to consumers with credit, debit, or NFC enabled electronic wallets like Apple Pay and Google Pay while providing operators with both telemetry and machine-to-machine (M2M) services. ePort technology is primarily found in vending machines, kiosks and point-of-sale (POS) terminals, but the ePort Online and ePort Mobile products have extended the network to accept recurring payments from a PC or retail outlets and the taxi industry through smartphone devices.

== History ==
USA Technologies was founded in 1992 and holds more than 87 patents on its products and services. Its patents range from payment processing, transaction methods, and terminal connection methods to energy management and telematics. There are currently over 250,000 connections to its ePort Connect Service. The company was named in Deloitte L.L.P.'s 2014 Technology Fast 500 List of the fastest-growing companies in North America. They worked with Setomatic Systems to be the first to bring NFC technology into the self-service laundry market The Nilson Report ranked USA Technologies 6th in the US (and 28th worldwide) in POS shipments, and they received the 2014 Frost & Sullivan North American Customer Value Leadership Award in Financial Services and Retail M2M Communications.

In 2010, a proxy fight for the company's board of directors took place with shareholder group SAVE Partners. This proxy fight ended with the addition of two SAVE Board candidates and the modification of company policies. In 2012, there was another proxy fight involving SAVE, but this dispute resulted in no change to the board.

USA Technologies' CEO George Jensen was suspended on 4 October 2011, after he was revealed to be posting company information to an investor board and resigned two weeks later. Stephen Herbert was appointed as CEO and held that position until he stepped down in 2019 due to the "start of a proxy battle brought by its largest investor", Hudson Executive Capital.

USA Technologies announced its name change to Cantaloupe, Inc. on 19 April 2021.

== Products ==
Cantaloupe's primary product is the ePort, a cashless payment terminal for vending machines, kiosks, and POS terminals. The ePort EDGE accepts magnetic swipe cards, and the ePort G8 & G9 series also accept contactless cards, FOB, PIN, and virtual wallets such as Apple Pay and Softcard. It features an inclusive system for providing remote audits, cashless payment, and interactive transaction capabilities in a vending machine. In 2010, the ePort EDGE won the National Automatic Merchandising Association (NAMA) award for innovation in cashless vending technology.

Specific to vending machines, Cantaloupe holds over a dozen patents and have maintained partnerships with MasterCard Worldwide, Dr. Pepper/Seven Up, Kodak, ZiLOG, CineMachine, MEI, and Wurlitzer, among others.

The company has been ranked several times among the leading shippers of point-of-sale terminals by The Nilson Report, a source of news and research on consumer payment systems worldwide. In 2009, it ranked 6th in the US and 31st in the world. In 2013, the report ranked 6th in point-of-sale shipments in the United States and 28th in the world. Cantaloupe announced its expansion initiatives in Australia in June 2018.
