= Cavallasca =

- Frazione
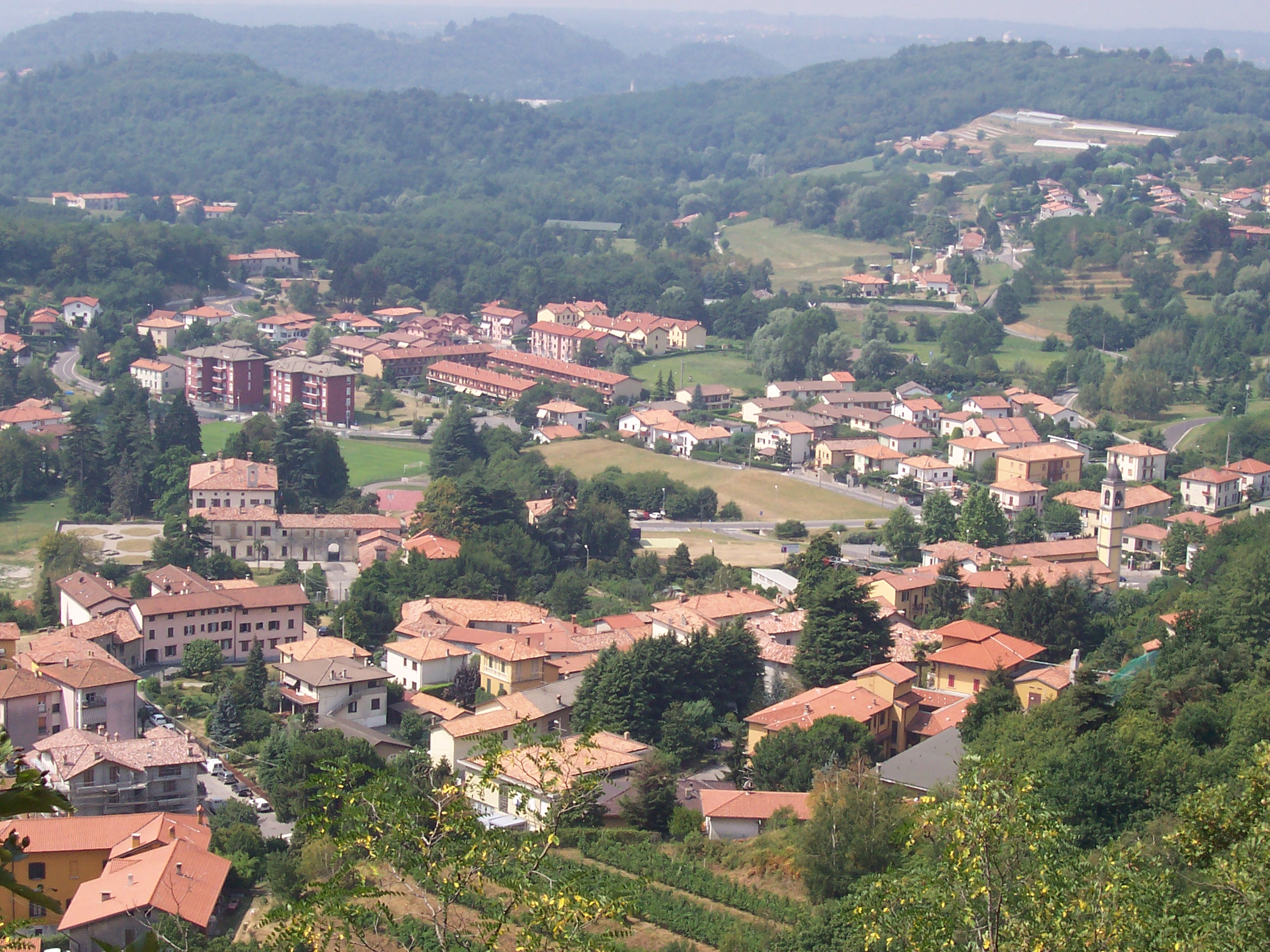

- Location of Cavallasca in Italy
- Coordinates: 45°49′N 9°2′E
- Country: Italy
- Region: Lombardy
- Province: Province of Como (CO)
- Comune: San Fermo della Battaglia

Area
  - Total: 2.7 km^{2} (1.0 sq mi)

Population (Dec. 2004)
  - Total: 2,816
  - Density: 1,000/km^{2} (2,700/sq mi)
- Time zone: UTC+1 (CET)
  - Summer (DST): UTC+2 (CEST)
- Postal code: 22020
- Dialing code: 031

Cavallasca was a comune (municipality) in the Province of Como in the Italian region Lombardy, located about 40 kilometres (25 mi) north of Milan and about 4 kilometres (2 mi) west of Como, on the border with Switzerland. It's a frazione of San Fermo della Battaglia since 2017. As of 31 December 2004, it had a population of 2,816 and an area of 2.7 square kilometres (1.0 mi^{2}).

== Demographic evolution ==
Historical population

Year	Pop.	±%
1861	519	—
1871	499	−3.9%
1881	623	+24.8%
1901	660	+5.9%
1911	662	+0.3%

Year	Pop.	±%
1921	672	+1.5%
1931	712	+6.0%
1936	736	+3.4%
1951	758	+3.0%
1961	1,053	+38.9%

Year	Pop.	±%
1971	2,004	+90.3%
1981	2,368	+18.2%
1991	2,520	+6.4%
2001	2,733	+8.5%

Source: Data from ISTAT
