= Baron Cantilupe =

Extinct barony in the Peerage of England

Arms of Cantilupe of Greasley Castle, Nottinghamshire: Gules, a fess vair between three fleurs-de-lys or (this image as visible on the 1355 Cantilupe Chantry, Lincoln Cathedral), often stated to be three leopard's faces jessant-de-lys; the fess being a difference of the arms of the senior line, feudal barons of Eaton Bray

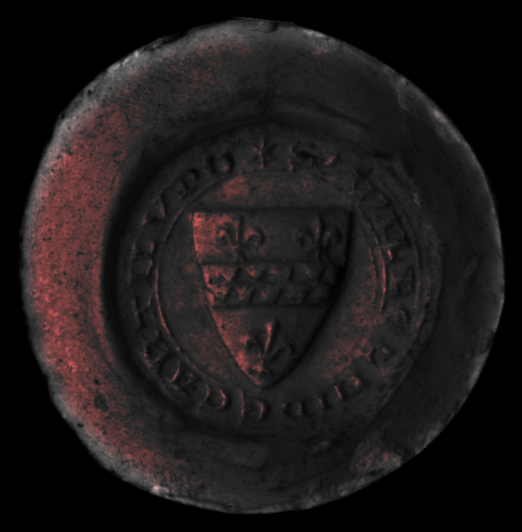
Seal of William de Cantilupe, 1st Baron Cantilupe (1262-1308), of Greasley, used to seal the Barons' Letter of 1301 to the pope

Modern transcript of the blazon in Norman-French of the arms of William de Cantilupe, 1st Baron Cantilupe (1262-1308), Caerlaverock Roll, 1300, with reconstructed image of the arms so described, with three leopard's faces jessant-de-lys

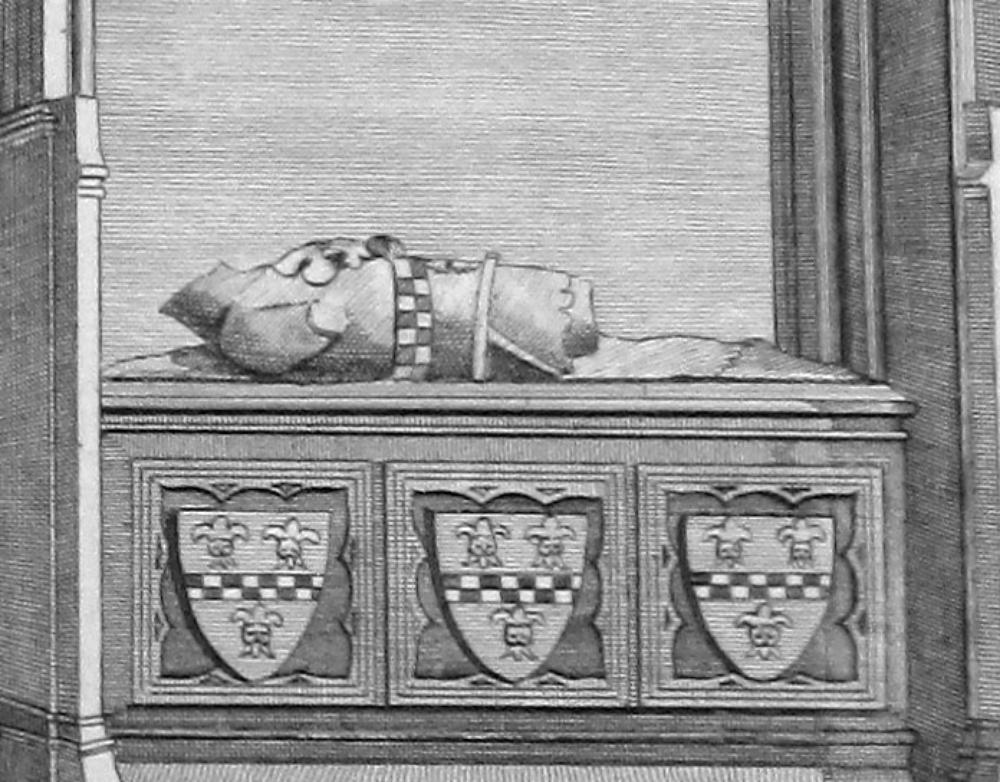
Drawing of mutilated effigy of Nicholas de Cantilupe, 3rd Baron Cantilupe (c.1301-1355), Lincoln Cathedral

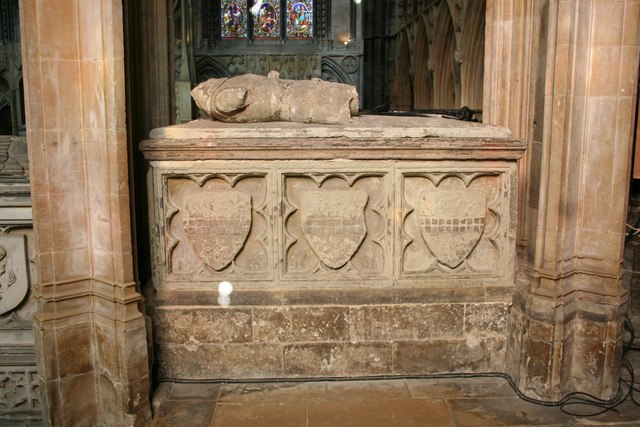
Photograph of mutilated effigy of Nicholas de Cantilupe, 3rd Baron Cantilupe (c.1301-1355), Lincoln Cathedral

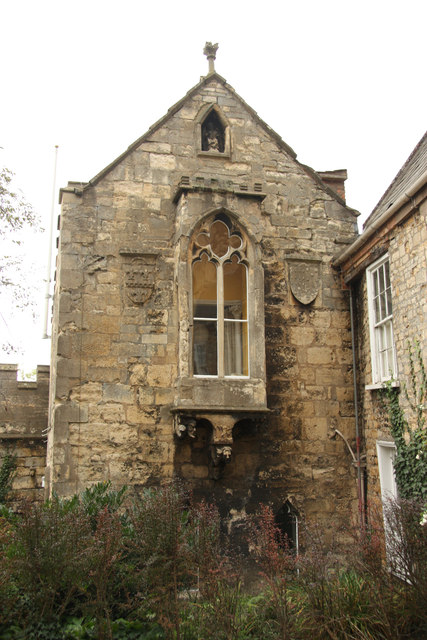
Priests' House of the Cantilupe Chantry, Lincoln Cathedral, built by Nicholas de Cantilupe, 3rd Baron Cantilupe, showing the arms of Cantilupe of Greasley and Zouche of Lubbesthorpe. He also founded Beauvale Priory in 1343 with the consent of his cousin William la Zouche (1299–1352) , Archbishop of York

Baron Cantilupe (properly Cauntelo) was a title created in the peerage of England by writ on 29 December 1299 addressed to Willelmo de Canti Lupo or Cauntelo, (William de Cantilupe (1262-1308) of Greasley Castle in Nottinghamshire and of Ravensthorpe Castle in the parish of Boltby, North Yorkshire).

== History ==
The name has numerous variations in spelling (Canteloupe, Cauntiloue, Cauntelou, Cantiloue, Cauntilieu, Cantelo, Canteloo, Cantelowe, Cantlow, etc.) with a Latinized form de Cantilupo. The standard spelling used by modern historians is "Cantilupe".

The de Cantilupe family came to England some time after the Norman Conquest of 1066, originating at one of several similarly named manors in Normandy, from which they took their name: Canteloup in Calvados, east of Caen or Chanteloup in Bréhal, Manche, or Canteloup in Manche east of Cherbourg on the tip of the Cherbourg Peninsula.

The de Cantilupe family of Greasley was a junior branch of a prominent Anglo-Norman family, descended from Sir Nicholas de Cantilupe (d.1266), who married Eustachia FitzHugh, heiress of Greasley. Sir Nicholas was the 5th and youngest son of William II de Cantilupe (d.1251), 2nd feudal baron of Eaton Bray in Bedfordshire, steward of the household to King Henry III (whose own father, William I de Cantilupe (died 1239), had been steward of the household to King John, father of Henry III). Sir Nicholas's uncle was Walter de Cantilupe (1195-1266), Bishop of Worcester , and his elder brother was Thomas de Cantilupe (1220-1282), Chancellor of England, Bishop of Hereford, who was canonised as a saint in 1320. The senior line died out in the male line in 1273 on the death of the 22-year-old George de Cantilupe (1251-1273), 4th feudal baron of Eaton Bray, Lord of Abergavenny, who had inherited vast Welsh estates from his mother Eva de Briouze. In 1349, long after the extinction of the senior line of the family, it was Nicholas de Cantilupe, 3rd Baron Cantilupe (c.1301-1355) of Greasley, who hosted the important ceremony at Hereford Cathedral required to translate the relics of his great-uncle Saint Thomas de Cantilupe over to the new shrine prepared for them.

The 1st Baron signed and sealed the Barons' Letter of 1301 to the pope (as Dominus de Ravensthorpe, "lord (of the manor) of Ravensthorpe") and was present at the Siege of Caerlaverock Castle in Scotland in 1300, when his armorials, a version of the arms of the senior line differenced by a fess vair (as seen on his surviving 1301 seal), were blazoned in verse in the Caerlaverock Roll. He married Eve de Boltby, heiress of Boltby and of Ravensthorpe Castle within that manor, and is believed to be represented by the heavily restored recumbent effigy of a knight in Felixkirk Church, adjacent to Ravensthorpe Castle in Yorkshire (alternately interpreted as John de Walkyngham (d.1284)).

He was succeeded by his eldest son by Eve de Boltby, William de Cantilupe, 2nd Baron Cantilupe (1293-c.1321), who was involved in the murder of Piers Gaveston, favourite of King Edward II. In 1313, William begged King Edward on bended knee for forgiveness, after which he relinquished his estates to his younger brother, Nicholas. William died at the age of 28, unmarried. His younger brother Nicholas succeeded him as the 3rd Baron Cantilupe (c.1301-1355). In 1343, Nicholas founded Beauvale Priory within his deer park at Greasley, with the consent of his distant cousin William La Zouche, Archbishop of York (one of the two co-heirs of the de Cantilupe senior line was a member of the Zouche family, descended from one of Archbishop William's two sisters), on the death of George de Cantilupe (1251-1273), 4th feudal baron of Eaton Bray, Lord of Abergavenny. Amongst the many Cantilupe manors they inherited was Harringworth , which they made their seat. (See Baron Zouche "of Haryngworth"). He served as Governor of Berwick from 1335. He was buried in Lincoln Cathedral, where his severely mutilated recumbent effigy still survives atop a chest tomb displaying the arms of Cantilupe of Greasley. He disinherited his son (by his first wife "Tiphane") William de Cantilupe, 4th Baron Cantilupe (1325-c.1375), last in the male line who was predeceased by his two sons, Nicholas de Cantilupe (1342-1371) of Greasley, eldest son and heir of his grandfather, slain at Avignon petitioning the pope to reverse the annulment of his marriage obtained by his wife (Katherine Paynel), supposedly on the grounds of impotence. He died without issue, his younger brother William de Cantilupe (1344-1375) becoming his heir, but he was murdered by his cook and squire, possibly at the behest of his wife Maud Neville. The murder became a much-celebrated criminal lawsuit, see Murder of William de Cantilupe.

== Barons Cantilupe (1299) ==
- William de Cantilupe, 1st Baron Cantilupe (1262-1308)
- William de Cantilupe, 2nd Baron Cantilupe (1293-c.1321) (son)
- Nicholas de Cantilupe, 3rd Baron Cantilupe (c.1301-1355) (brother)
- William de Cantilupe, 4th Baron Cantilupe (1325-c.1375) (son)

== Bibliography ==
- G. E. Cokayne, The Complete Peerage, n.s.¶, vol.3, pp. 111–116
- Sanders, I.J. English Baronies: A Study of their Origin and Descent 1086–1327, Oxford, 1960, pp. 39–40
