= St Felix's Church, Felixkirk =

Church in Felixkirk, North Yorkshire, England

Coordinates: 54.2564°N 1.2833°W

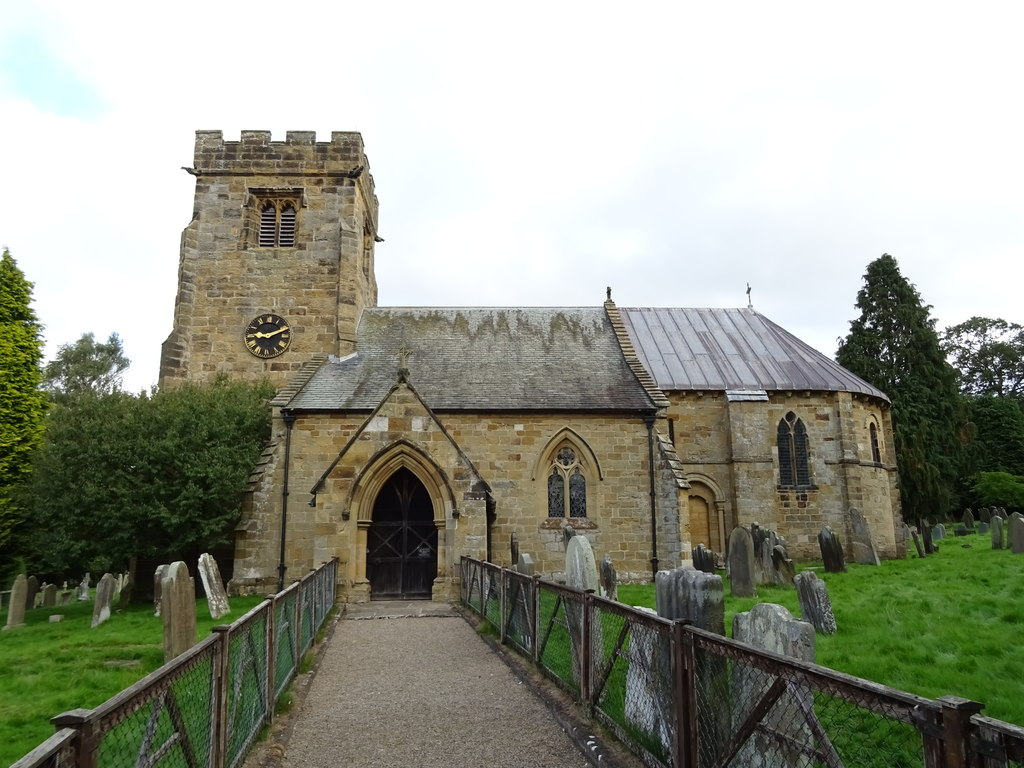
The church, in 2020

St Felix's Church is the parish church of Felixkirk, a village in North Yorkshire, in England.

There was a church in Felixkirk before the Norman Conquest. The church was enlarged in the 12th century, with aisles added, and much of the material survives from this period. Nikolaus Pevsner discusses the idea that the nave may originally have been round, although remains do not suggest this, and the form would be very unusual for the region. The tower was added in the 15th century, and perhaps in the 16th century a square sanctuary was added. Between 1859 and 1860, W. H. Dykes heavily restored the church, attempting to create an idealised Romanesque appearance. He located the foundations of the original rounded chancel, demolishing the sanctuary and rebuilding on the foundations. The church was grade II* listed in 1966.

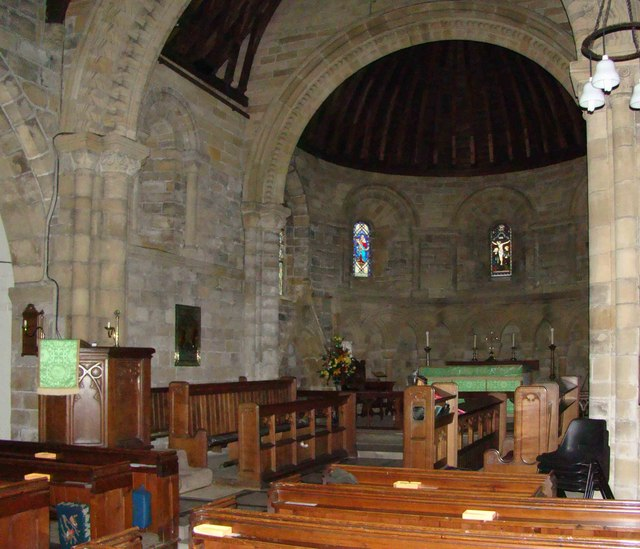
View into the chancel

The church is built in sandstone, with a lead roof on the chancel, and a stone slate roof elsewhere. The church consists of a nave, north and south aisles, a south porch, a chancel with an apse, and a west tower. The tower has two stages, diagonal buttresses, a three-light west window, a south clock face, two-light bell openings, and an embattled parapet. The west window in the south aisle is Norman, and in the chancel is a re-set Norman doorway. Inside the church is the tomb of William de Cantilupe, who died in 1309, and there is an effigy of Eva of Boltby, of similar date.

== See also ==
- Grade II* listed churches in North Yorkshire (district)
- Listed buildings in Felixkirk
