= Holy Trinity Church, Boltby =

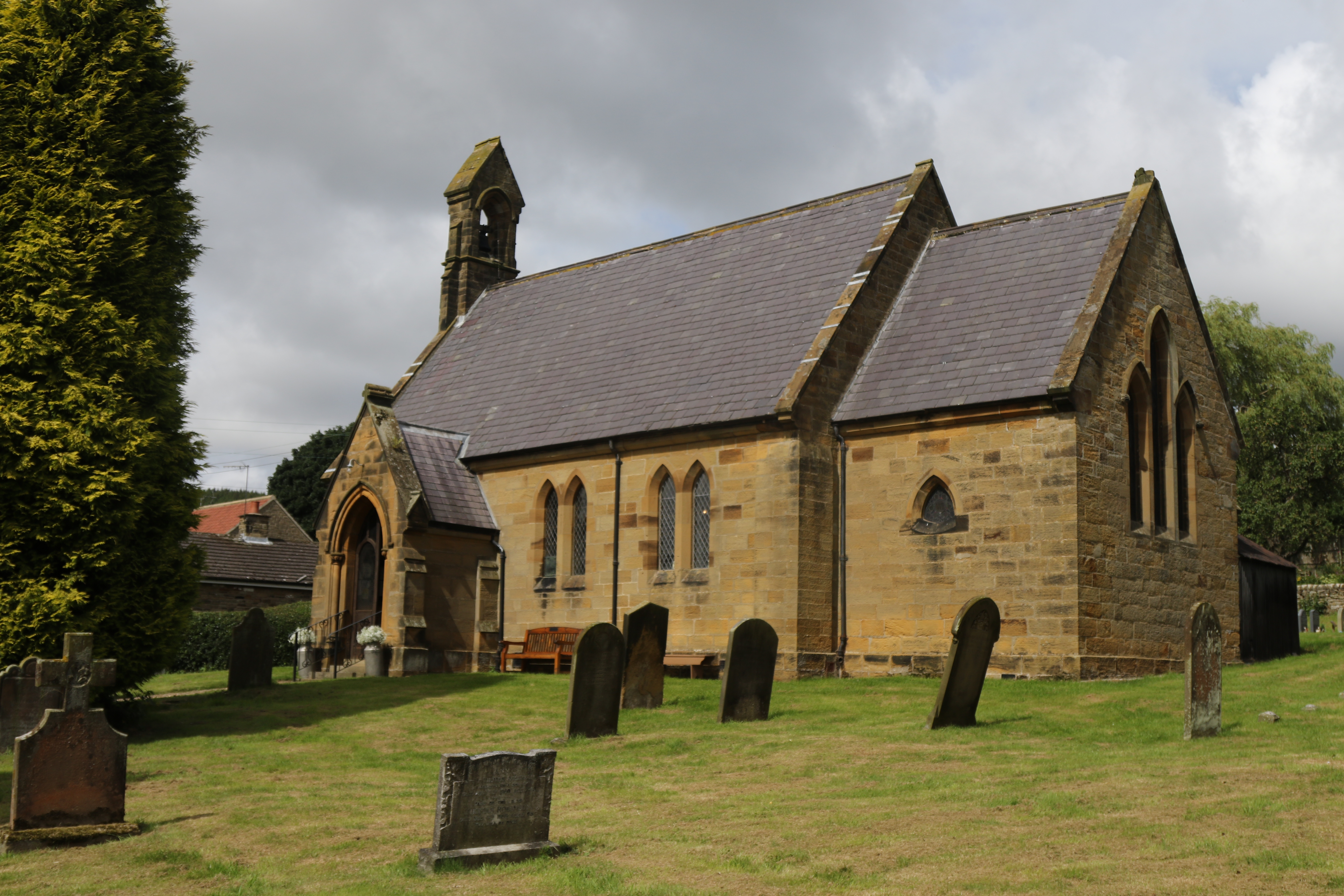
- Holy Trinity Church, Boltby
- Holy Trinity Church, Boltby
- 54°16′23.11″N 1°14′51.8″W
- OS grid reference: SE 490 866
- Location: Boltby
- Country: England
- Denomination: Church of England

History
- Dedication: Holy Trinity

Administration
- Province: York
- Diocese: Diocese of York
- Archdeaconry: Cleveland
- Deanery: Mowbray
- Parish: Felixkirk with Boltby

Holy Trinity Church, Boltby is a parish church in the Church of England in Boltby.

== History ==
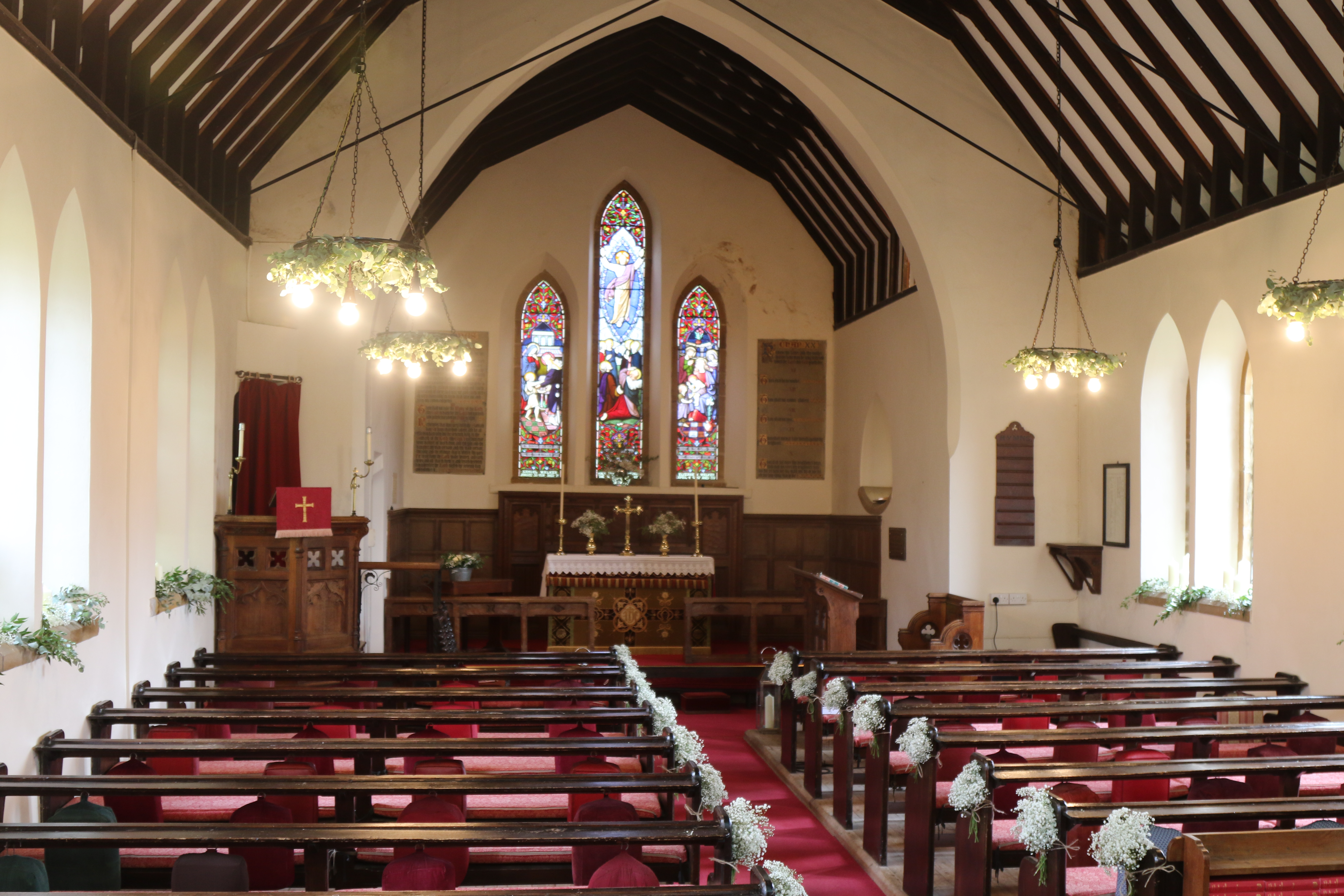
The nave and chancel

The first chapel was founded in 1409 and was rebuilt on 23 October 1802.

Pevsner noted that the church was rebuilt in 1859 by William Burn, but there is no mention of this in contemporary newspapers. There is a report in the Yorkshire Gazette of 12 January 1856 which states that it was restored by the architects, (John) Atkinson of York, with the church furniture being made by French of Bolton-le-Moors. The church re-opened on 8 January 1856. The porch was added in 1907.

Parish registers date from around 1600.

The church is a chapel of ease to St Felix's Church, Felixkirk.
