= William de Cantilupe, 1st Baron Cantilupe =

English magnate

Arms of Cantilupe of Greasley Castle, Nottinghamshire: Gules, a fess vair between three fleurs-de-lys or (this image as visible on the 1355 Cantilupe Chantry, Lincoln Cathedral), often stated to be three leopard's faces jessant-de-lys; the fess being a difference of the arms of the senior line, feudal barons of Eaton Bray

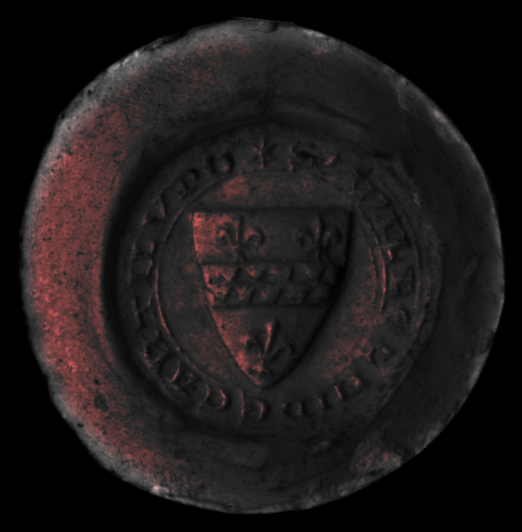
Seal of William de Cantilupe, 1st Baron Cantilupe (1262-1308), of Greasley, used to seal the Barons' Letter of 1301 to the pope

William de Cantilupe, 1st Baron Cantilupe (1262-1308) of Greasley Castle in Nottinghamshire and of Ravensthorpe Castle in the parish of Boltby, North Yorkshire, was created Baron Cantilupe in 1299 by King Edward I. He was one of the magnates who signed and sealed the Barons' Letter of 1301 to the pope and was present at the Siege of Caerlaverock Castle in Scotland in 1300, when his armorials were blazoned in Norman-French verse in the Caerlaverock Roll.

== Origins ==
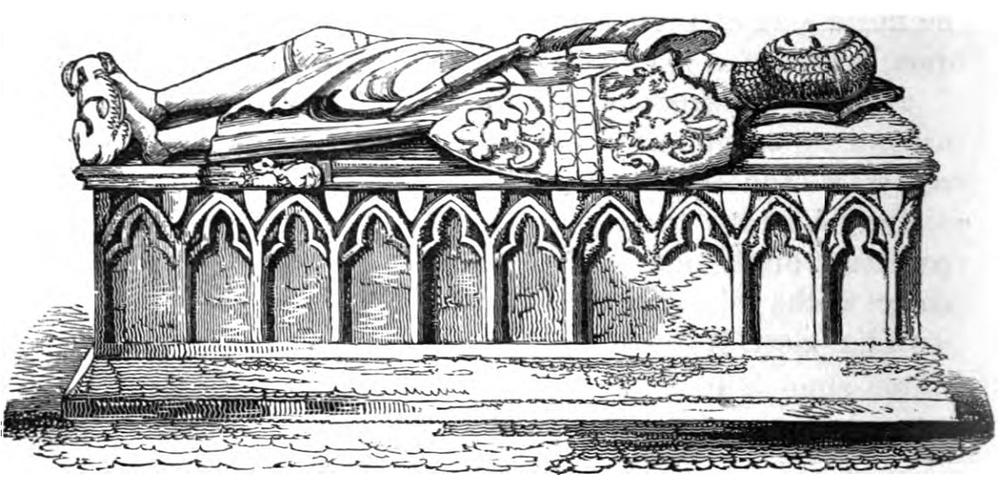
Recumbent effigy and chest tomb of Sir Nicholas de Cantilupe (d.1266), father of William de Cantilupe, 1st Baron Cantilupe; St Mary's Church, Ilkeston, Derbyshire

He was born in 1262 at Lenton Priory in Nottinghamshire (to which his maternal ancestors the de Greasley family had been benefactors), the son and heir of Sir Nicholas de Cantilupe (d.1266) of Withcall (an ancient Cantilupe possession) in Lincolnshire, Greasley in Nottinghamshire and Ilkeston in Derbyshire, by his wife Eustachia FitzHugh, daughter and heiress of Ralph FitzHugh of Greasley (whose mother was Agnes de Greasley, heiress of Greasley and Ilkeston) and of Middle Claydon in Buckinghamshire. William's father died when he was aged four and was buried in St Mary's Church, Ilkeston where survives his recumbent effigy and chest tomb, showing him as a "lively" cross-legged warrior, often said to be a depiction reserved for crusaders. He displays the arms of Cantilupe of Greasley sculpted on his shield. Within two years his mother remarried, to William de Ros (1254-1310) of Ingmanthorpe in Yorkshire (uncle of William Ros, 1st Baron Ros (d.1316) who married the heiress of Belvoir Castle) by whom she had further issue.

William's father (Sir Nicholas de Cantilupe (d.1266)) was the 5th and youngest son of William II de Cantilupe (d.1251), 2nd feudal baron of Eaton Bray in Bedfordshire, steward of the household to King Henry III (whose own father William I de Cantilupe (died 1239) had been steward of the household to King John, father of Henry III). Sir Nicholas's uncle was Walter de Cantilupe (1195-1266), Bishop of Worcester and his elder brother was Thomas de Cantilupe (1220-1282), Chancellor of England, Bishop of Hereford, who was canonised as a saint in 1320. The senior line died out in the male line in 1273 on the death of his first cousin, 22 year-old Sir George de Cantilupe (1251-1273), 4th feudal baron of Eaton Bray, Lord of Abergavenny, who had inherited vast Welsh estates from his mother Eva de Briouze.

== Career ==
In May 1274 at the age of 12 he accompanied his uncle Thomas de Cantilupe, who would be appointed Bishop of Hereford the following year, to the Second Council of Lyons. On 29 December 1299 he was summoned by writ of King Edward I addressed to Willelmo de Canti Lupo or Cauntelo, by which he was created Baron Cantilupe (properly Cauntelo), a title in the peerage of England. He signed and sealed the Barons' Letter of 1301 to the pope (as Dominus de Ravensthorpe, "lord (of the manor) of Ravensthorpe").

=== Caerlaverock Roll ===
Modern transcript of the blazon in Norman-French of the arms of William de Cantilupe, 1st Baron Cantilupe (1262-1308), Caerlaverock Roll, 1300, with reconstructed image of the arms so described, with three leopard's faces jessant-de-lys

The 1st Baron's arms as blazoned in the Caerlaverock Roll (1300): Gules, three leopard's faces jessant-de-lys or

He was present at the Siege of Caerlaverock Castle in Scotland in 1300, when his armorials, a version of the arms of the senior line differenced by a fess vair (as seen on his surviving 1301 seal), were blazoned in Norman-French verse in the Caerlaverock Roll as follows:

E Guillemes de Cantelo,
Ke je par ceste raison lo,
Ke en honneur a tous tens vescu
Fesse vaire ot el rouge escu
De trois flours de lis de or espars
Naissans de testes de lupars.

Translated by Sir Nicholas Harris Nicolas as: "And William de Cantilupe, whom I for this reason praise, that he has at all times lived in honour. He had on a red shield a fess vair, with three fleurs-de-lys of bright gold issuing from leopard's heads".

== Marriages and children ==
He married twice:

- Firstly at some time before 1285 he married Maud d'Arches, daughter and heiress of Osbert d'Arches of Aston and Kereby, Yorkshire, and of Somerby in Lincolnshire and of Normanton in Nottinghamshire. Died childless.
- Secondly in 1292 he married Eve de Boltby, daughter and co-heiress of Adam de Boltby of Boltby and Ravensthorpe in Yorkshire and of Langley in Northumberland, and widow successively of Alan de Walkingham (d.1283) of Cowthorpe, Yorkshire (by whom she had male issue William Walkingham of Boltby and Ravensthorpe, who died childless, when Nicholas de Cantilupe, 3rd Baron Cantilupe (c.1301-1355) obtained possession of those manors) and secondly of Richard Knout/Knut (d.1291). Eve de Boltby is believed to be represented by the recumbent stone female effigy in Felixkirk Church, near Ravensthorpe. By Eve he had issue:
  - William de Cantilupe, 2nd Baron Cantilupe (1293-c.1321), eldest son and heir who died unmarried, having at the age of 20 refused an arranged match claiming he was too young and that he "desires no woman for his wife". He played a role in the 1312 murder of Piers Gaveston, the favourite of King Edward II. In 1313 he begged that king on his knees for forgiveness and in 1321 he relinquished all his estates in favour of his younger brother.
  - Nicholas de Cantilupe, 3rd Baron Cantilupe (c.1301-1355), younger son and heir of his brother.

== Death ==
He died in 1308. It has been suggested that the (heavily restored) recumbent stone effigy of a knight in Felixkirk Church, near Ravensthorpe, is his monument, although others believe it to represent John de Walkyngham (d.1284)

== Sources ==
- G. E. Cokayne, The Complete Peerage, n.s., vol.3, pp. 111–116
- Sanders, I.J. English Baronies: A Study of their Origin and Descent 1086–1327, Oxford, 1960, pp. 39–40

Peerage of England
New creation	Baron Cantilupe; 1299–1308	Succeeded by William de Cantilupe
