= Kirby Knowle Castle =

Building in Kirby Knowle, North Yorkshire, England

Coordinates: 54.2808°N 1.2964°W

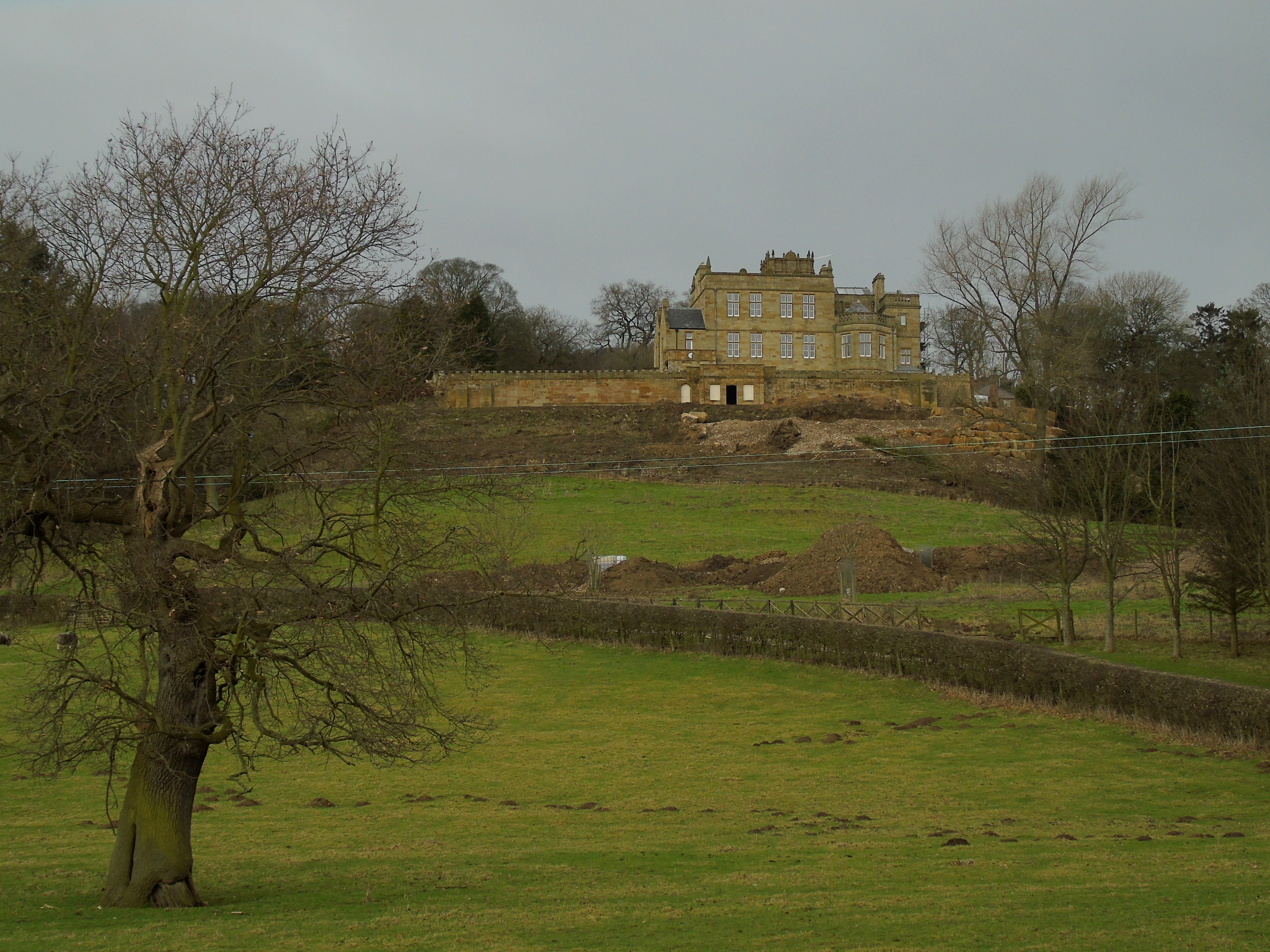
The building, in 2018

Kirby Knowle Castle is a historic building in Kirby Knowle, a village in North Yorkshire, in England.

== History ==
The first castle on the site is believed to have been built in the late 12th century, by Roger Lascelles. The castle burned down in 1568. Its owner, John Constable, rebuilt it in the contemporary style, but he died before it was completed, and it fell into ruin. A survey of the site mentioned that Constable had founded a "mansion house of a great hight and length, passing beautiful of itself and fair of prospect, whereto belongs one goodly hall, great chamber, parlour, and bed chamber, with a number of other pleasant lodgings and chambers", including a study, a gallery, a chapel, with kitchen, bakehouse, and brew house.

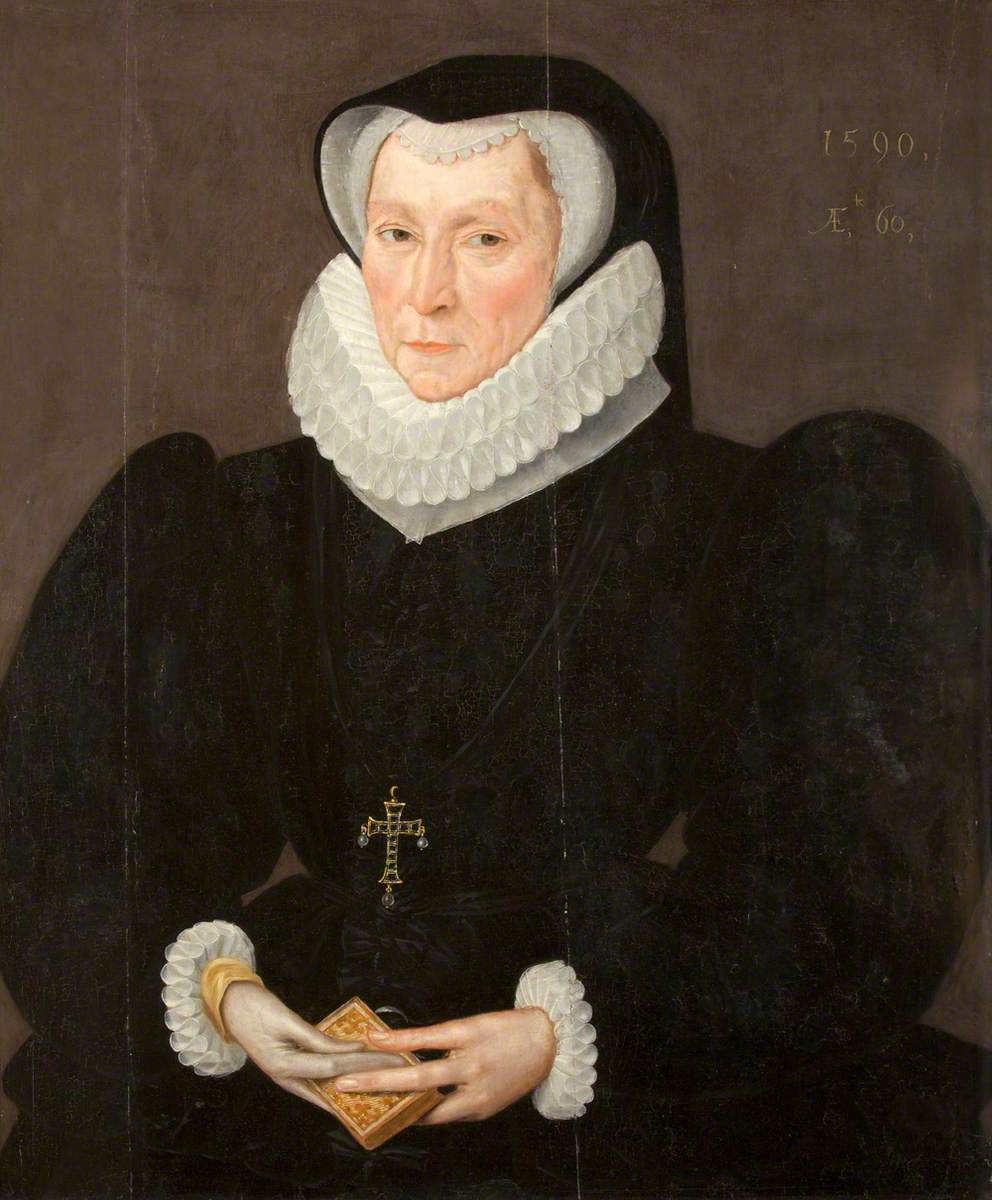
Catherine Neville, Lady Constable, by Robert Peake the Elder

John Constable's wife Katherine, a daughter of Henry Neville, 5th Earl of Westmorland, died in 1590. Her will mentions Elizabethan luxuries, including a porcelain cup that guarded against poisoning, and a couch of cloth of gold which she bequeathed to Lord Ogle. She bequeathed a gold cross set with diamonds (which features in her portraits) to her daughter-in-law Margaret Dormer, Lady Constable. If she died "north of Trent" she wished to be buried at Halsham next to her husband.

In February 1597, John Ferne searched the castle and captured the Catholic recusant Joseph Constable of Upsall and his companions Francis Wycliffe and Cuthbert Plusgrave. Joseph was the stepson of Lady Katherine Constable. David Ingleby and Constable were said to be hopeful of a change in government and rode around Yorkshire like Robin Hood. According to Ferne, the building had vaults and secret passages above and below ground. Joseph Constable was imprisoned at York Castle. A small mural closet space at Kirby Knowle was shown as priest hole in the 19th-century.

The "New Building" or "New Bigging" of Kirby Knowle Castle was out of repair in 1652, and had been unoccupied by the Constable family since 1644. James Danby purchased the castle in 1654 (he had been a steward to John Constable). He repaired the building, adding a new south front and west wing. Some 19th-century sources call Danby's work the "New Building" but this name was already in use.

The house was restored in 1875, and it was grade II listed in 1952. The building was again restored in the 2010s, leaving the property with seven bedrooms, a cinema, games room, gym and steam room. In 2024, it was put for sale for £6.95 million.

== Description ==
The country house is built of stone with Welsh slate roofs. The main block has three storeys and four bays, to the right is a two-storey canted bay, then two bays extending to the north and a further block. In the angle is a five-stage tower, and to the left is a further two-storey three-bay range. The main block has a chamfered plinth, mullioned and transomed windows with hood moulds, a panelled parapet with semicircular battlements and obelisk corner finials. Elsewhere, there are cross windows, and the canted bay has an openwork parapet and a conical roof.

== See also ==
- Listed buildings in Kirby Knowle
