= Listed buildings in Upsall =

Upsall is a civil parish in the county of North Yorkshire, England. It contains five listed buildings that are recorded in the National Heritage List for England. All the listed buildings are designated at Grade II, the lowest of the three grades, which is applied to "buildings of national importance and special interest". The parish contains the hamlet of Upsall and the surrounding countryside. The listed buildings consist of structures associated with Upsall Castle, a cottage, a model farm, and a farmhouse.

== Buildings ==
Name and location	Photograph	Date	Notes
Remains of castle walls, Upsall Castle; 54.27634°N 1.30412°W	—	14th century (probable)	The remains of the castle walls are in sandstone, and are up to 15 feet (4.6 m) in height. They include the remains of a circular tower on the west side, and of the southeast corner tower with traces of chamfered elliptical-arched openings.
Nevison House; 54.25775°N 1.29862°W		18th century	The farmhouse is in dark red-brown brick on a plinth, with stone dressings, chamfered quoins, a floor band, and a swept pantile roof with stone coping and shaped kneelers. There are two storeys and three bays. The central doorway has a shouldered surround with alternating block jambs, and a datestone with a motif. The windows are sashes in architraves.
Castle Farm; 54.27201°N 1.30395°W	—	1860	A model farm in sandstone with Welsh slate roofs, the buildings arranged round three sides of a courtyard, and mainly in a single storey. The entrance range on the north side includes a gatehouse with a bell tower, looseboxes, a storage building at the west end, a three-storey granary with a pigeon loft, and a barn at the east end. The west range has looseboxes, stalls and a two-storey dovecote, and the east range has looseboxes. The gatehouse has a wagon entrance with a pointed arch, and a gable with bargeboards and a wrought iron finial. The bell tower is square, with lancet windows, and a pyramidal roof with a weathervane.
Garden Cottage and walls 54.27719°N 1.30247°W	—	c.1880	The cottage is in rusticated sandstone, with a chamfered string course, and a stone slate roof with stepped raised verges and stone coping. There is one storey and an attic, and three bays. The central doorway has a shouldered chamfered surround, and is flanked by two-light casement windows with chamfered mullions. In the centre is a projecting gable with shouldered coping containing a recessed panel with a shield. The garden wall is about 2 feet 6 inches (0.76 m) in height, with coping and gate posts. The flanking walls curve round the garden and are about 13 feet (4.0 m) in height.
Gatehouse and wall, Upsall Castle; 54.27726°N 1.30201°W		c.1880	The gatehouse is in rusticated sandstone, with a floor band, and a hipped Welsh slate roof with iron cresting. There are two storeys and one bay. It contains a doorway with a pointed arch, and a chamfered and moulded surround, and above it is a recessed panel containing a coat of arms. The wall extends to the right, it is coped, and about 13 feet (4.0 m) in height.
