= William Harrington (priest) =

English Roman Catholic priest and martyr

Blessed
- Born: c. 1565; Yorkshire, England
- Died: 18 February 1594; Tyburn, England
- Venerated in: Roman Catholic Church
- Beatified: 1929 by Pius XI
- Feast: 18 February

William Harrington (c. 1566 – 18 February 1594) was an English Jesuit priest. He is a Roman Catholic martyr, and was beatified in 1929.

== Life ==
His father had entertained Edmund Campion at the ancestral home, Mount St. John, early in 1581. Young William, inspired by Campion, went abroad to train as a priest. He was first at the seminary at Reims, then went to study under the Jesuits at Tournai (1582–1584). He would have joined the order, but his health broke down and forced him to remain home for the next six years.

In February 1591 however, he was able to return to Reims, and having been ordained, returned at midsummer 1592. Harrington worked in the south of England before being captured. The following May he fell into the hands of the English authorities, whereupon he was arrested and confined to the dungeons for several months. Harrington was sentenced to be hanged, drawn and quartered at Tyburn for the crime of being a Catholic priest. He was given the chance to spare his life if he renounced the Catholic faith and were to attend Protestant services just once. William refused. He was tortured on the rack, hanged until not quite dead, then disemboweled, before being beheaded.

Harrington's fate had an important literary side-effect. One of those who had sheltered him was Henry Donne, the brother of the poet John Donne. Henry was arrested and died of the plague in Newgate Prison. John Donne was also Catholic, but later embraced the Protestant Church of England, in an effort to spare his own life.

Harrington was beatified in 1929 by Pope Pius XI. His feast day is 18 February. He is also venerated on 22 November as one of the Martyrs of England, Scotland and Wales and on 29 October as one of the Martyrs of Douai.

== Bibliography ==
- Commendacions of Matrymony, c. 1528
