= Thirlby =

Village in North Yorkshire, England

Coordinates: 54.24912°N 1.25572°W

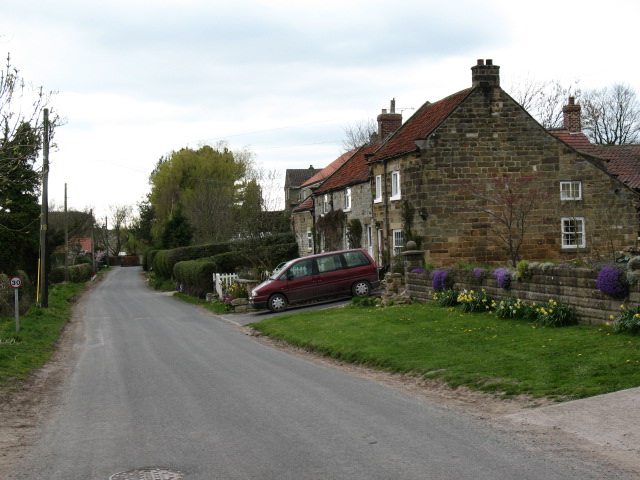
- Village street in Thirlby

- Location within North Yorkshire
- Population: 134 (2011 census)
- OS grid reference: SE485839
- Unitary authority: North Yorkshire
- Ceremonial county: North Yorkshire
- Region: Yorkshire and the Humber
- Country: England
- Sovereign state: United Kingdom
- Post town: THIRSK
- Postcode district: YO7
- Police: North Yorkshire
- Fire: North Yorkshire
- Ambulance: Yorkshire
- UK Parliament: Thirsk and Malton

Thirlby is a village and civil parish in the county of North Yorkshire, England. With a population of about 120 in 2003, measured at 134 at the 2011 Census, Thirlby is situated approximately 4 miles (6.4 km) east of Thirsk.

== Governance ==
The village lies within the Thirsk and Malton UK Parliament constituency. From 1974 to 2023 it was part of the Hambleton District, it is now administered by the unitary North Yorkshire Council.

== Geography ==
According to the 2001 UK Census, the village had a population of 127, of which 103 were over the age of sixteen. Of these, 68 were in employment. The village had 54 dwellings of which 43 were detached.

The nearest settlements are Felixkirk 1.4 miles (2.3 km) to the north west; Sutton-under-Whitestonecliffe 1 mile (1.6 km) to the south south west; Cold Kirby 2.75 miles (4.43 km) to the east and Boltby 1.5 miles (2.4 km) to the north. Thirlby Beck runs through the east of the village and is part of the tributary system of the River Swale.

== Notable residents ==
Veterinarian and author James Alfred Wight, known popularly as James Herriot, lived in Thirlby, fictionally named as High Field House in Hannerly in his books If Only They Could Talk and It Shouldn't Happen to a Vet.

== See also ==
- Listed buildings in Thirlby
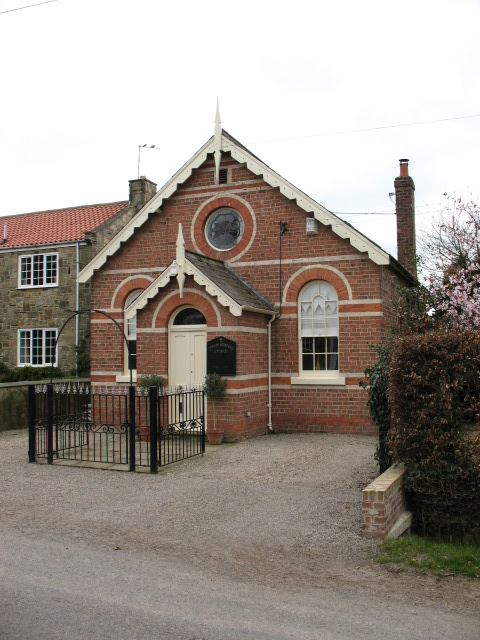
Former Methodist Chapel, Thirlby

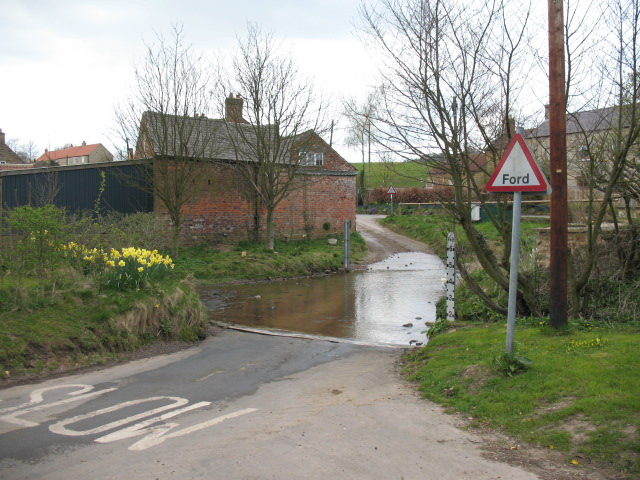
Thirlby Beck Ford in Thirlby village
