= Mount St John, Felixkirk =

Building in Felixkirk, North Yorkshire, England

Coordinates: 54°15′26″N 1°16′30″W

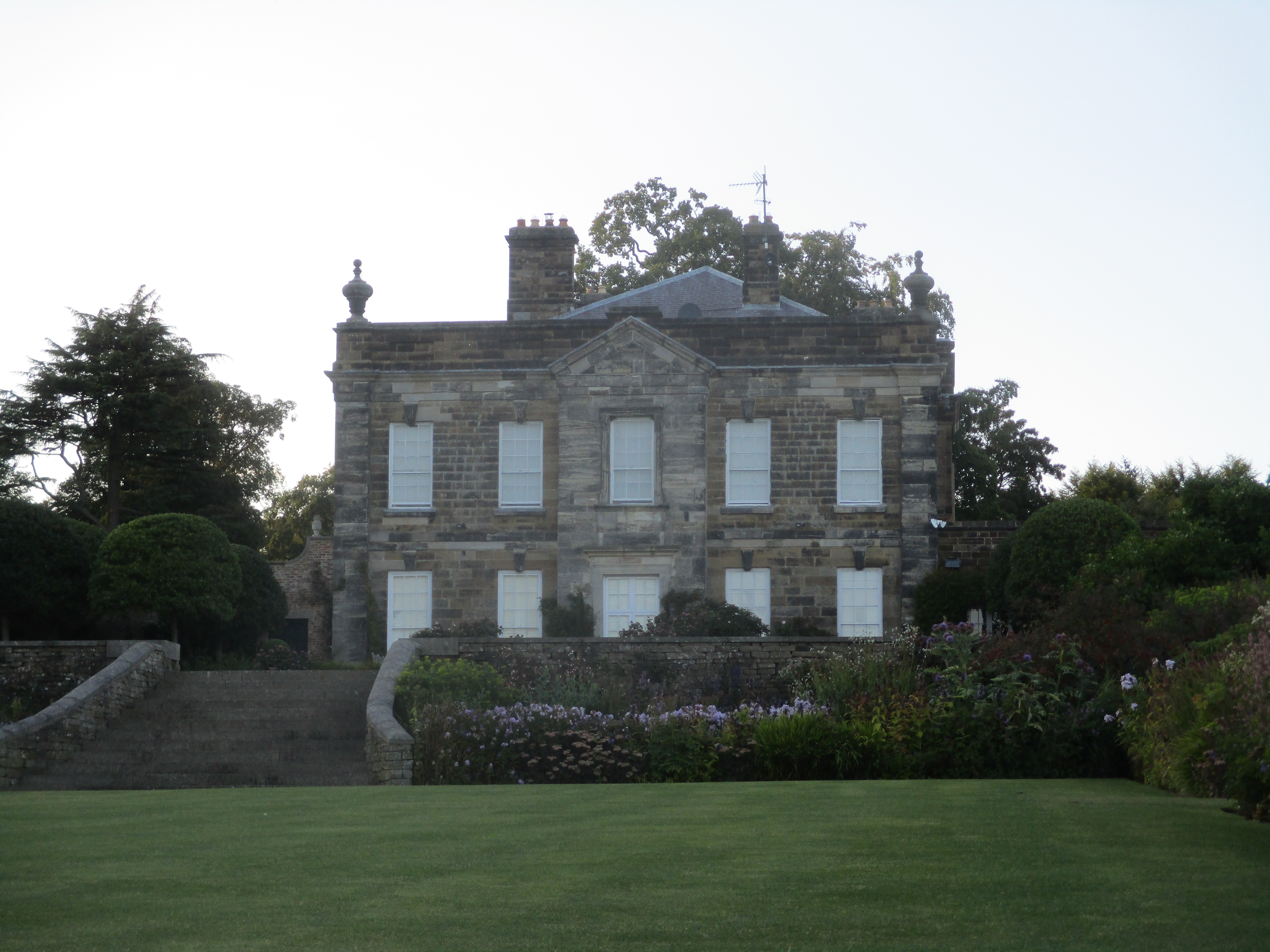
Mount St John built of sandstone in 1720

Mount St John is a historic building and estate in Felixkirk, a village in North Yorkshire, in England.

William Percy founded the Mount St. John Preceptory of the Knights Hospitallers in the area in 1148. It was abandoned following the Dissolution of the Monasteries, and while the current Mount St John's name recalls it, it is on a different site. The estate was owned by the Archbishop of York until 1870, and in 1720 it was let to William Elsley, who demolished an older house and built the current property. In the 19th century, the house was purchased by John Walker, who greatly extended it. His family owned the house until 1964.

The house was grade II* listed in 1978. In the early 21st century, it was owned by Chris Blundell, with gardens designed by Tom Stuart-Smith, and kitchen gardens which supply Blundell's hotel group, Provenance Inns.

The house is built of sandstone, and part of the extension is in brick. It has a hipped Welsh slate roof. The earlier part has two storeys and the extension is partly in three storeys. The south front has a plinth, giant angle pilasters, a floor band, an eaves band, a moulded cornice, a panelled parapet with urns on the corners, and a pediment over the central bay. There are five bays, the middle bay projecting. In the centre is the former entrance, with a shouldered architrave and a cornice. The windows are sashes with keystones, the window above the entrance with a shouldered architrave and a moulded sill and apron. The west front has been extended to twelve bays, and on the east front is a Venetian window. Inside, high-quality decoration includes two screens of columns in the entrance hall, and the main staircase with finely carved balusters.

== See also ==
- Grade II* listed buildings in North Yorkshire (district)
- Listed buildings in Felixkirk
