= Listed buildings in Kirby Knowle =

Kirby Knowle is a civil parish in the county of North Yorkshire, England. It contains eight listed buildings that are recorded in the National Heritage List for England. All the listed buildings are designated at Grade II, the lowest of the three grades, which is applied to "buildings of national importance and special interest". The parish contains the village of Kirby Knowle and the surrounding countryside, and the listed buildings consist of houses and associated structures, and a church and items in the churchyard.

== Buildings ==
Name and location	Photograph	Date	Notes
Two cross bases and a font 54.27895°N 1.28226°W		Late medieval (probable)	The cross bases and font are in the churchyard of St Wilfrid's Church to the south of the church, and are in stone. Each cross has a square chamfered base and a truncated rectangular shaft, one has grooves from tool sharpening, and the other is surmounted by a circular cross head. The font dates from the 17th century, and consists of a circular two-piece column carrying a bowl with a moulded base and a flat projecting rim.
Kirby Knowle Castle; 54.28076°N 1.29647°W		Mid 17th century	A large house that was altered in 1875, in stone with Welsh slate roofs. The main block has three storeys and four bays, to the right is a two-storey canted bay, then two bays extending to the north and a further block. In the angle is a five-stage tower, and to the left is a further two-storey three-bay range. The main block has a chamfered plinth, mullioned and transomed windows with hood moulds, a panelled parapet with semicircular battlements and obelisk corner finials. Elsewhere, there are cross windows, and the canted bay has an openwork parapet and a conical roof.
Garden walls, Kirby Knowle Castle; 54.28047°N 1.29687°W	—	17th century	The walls enclose the gardens to the south, west and north. They are in stone with chamfered coping, and vary in height. To the north of the house is an entrance with a moulded quoined surround, a Tudor arched head with sunk spandrels, a lintel with a roundel, and ball finials. At the west end is a pier with a chamfered top and a ball and cushion finial.
Statue west of Kirby Knowle Castle; 54.28059°N 1.29687°W	—	Mid to late 17th century	The statue is in lead on a stone pedestal. The pedestal has a square plinth with a base, and a chamfered cornice. The statue depicts a bearded Roman-style soldier.
Holme House; 54.27957°N 1.27970°W		Late 18th century	The house is in stone, and has a pantile roof with stone coping and shaped kneelers. There are two storeys and a single-storey outbuilding on the left. On the front is a blocked window and casement windows, all with lintels and keystones. The entrance is at the rear.
Knowle House; 54.27884°N 1.28135°W	—	Late 18th century	A rectory, later a private house, in stone, with a Welsh slate roof, stone coping and a shaped kneeler on the right. There is a main range of three and two storeys and five bays, a two-storey three-bay range added to the west, and a single-storey two-bay range to the east. On the garden front is a French window, and most of the windows in the house are sashes, some with keystones. At the rear is a gabled porch.
Manor House; 54.27990°N 1.27873°W	—	Late 18th century	The house, which was later extended, is in stone and has a Welsh slate roof with stone coping and shaped kneelers. There are two storeys, a main range of two bays, extensions to the left, and a rear outshut. In the centre is a doorway with pilasters, a dentilled cornice and a corbelled hood. The windows are sashes, some at the rear horizontally-sliding.
St Wilfrid's Church; 54.27906°N 1.28224°W		1873–74	The church, which was designed by G. Fowler Jones in Early English style, is built in stone with a Welsh slate roof. It consists of a nave, a chancel with a north vestry and a southwest tower with a gabled south porch. The tower has two stages, a chamfered plinth, buttresses, slit vents, paired bell openings with impost bands, and a stepped embattled parapet on a dentilled base. The windows in the church are lancets, and the east window has three lancets under quatrefoils.
