= St Wilfrid's Church, Kirby Knowle =

Church in North Yorkshire, England

Coordinates: 54°16′44″N 1°16′56″W

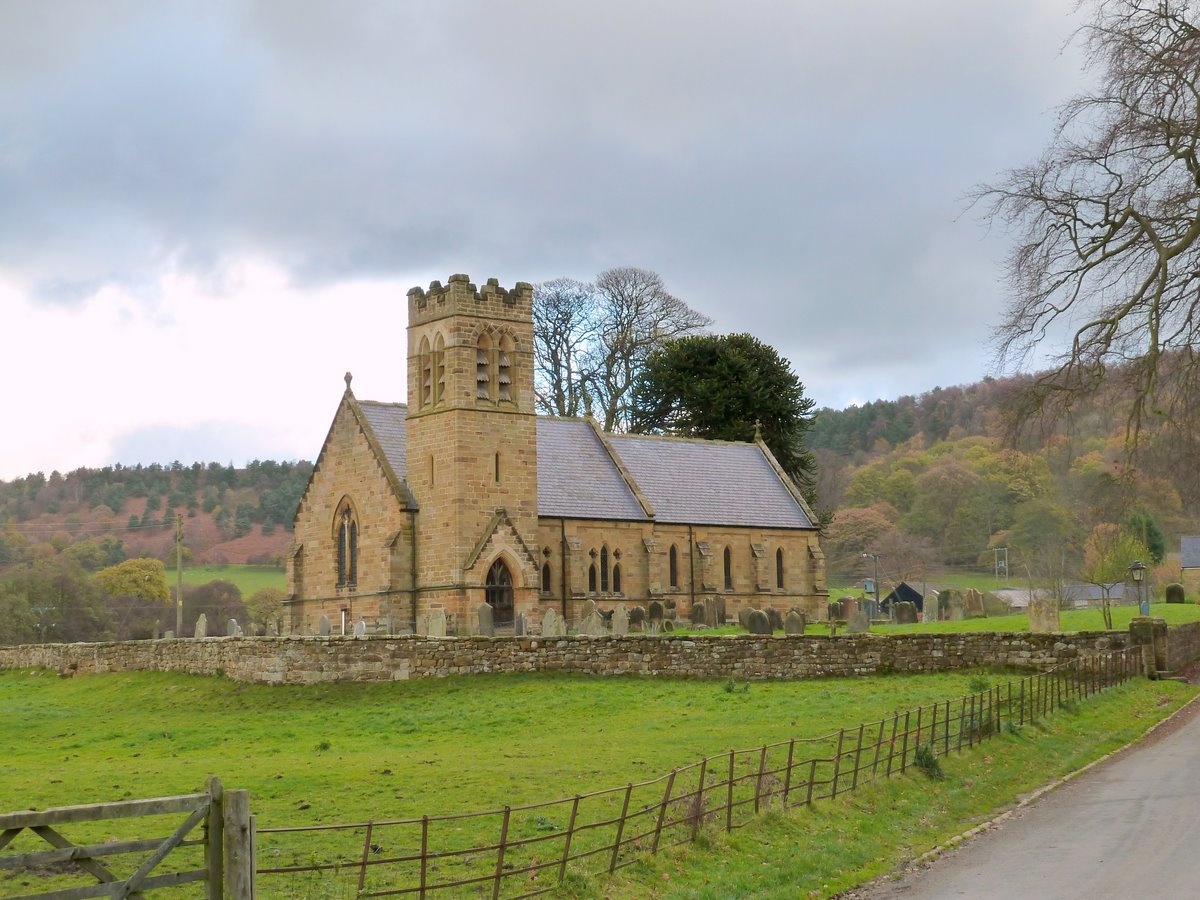
The building, in 2010

St Wilfrid's Church is the parish church of Kirby Knowle, a village in North Yorkshire, in England.

A church was built on the site in the 12th century, and was altered in the 13th century. Its chancel was rebuilt in 1815, but in 1848 it was still described as a "small structure". The building was demolished, and a new church was built between 1873 and 1874, to an Early English design by G. Fowler Jones. The church was grade II listed in 1966.

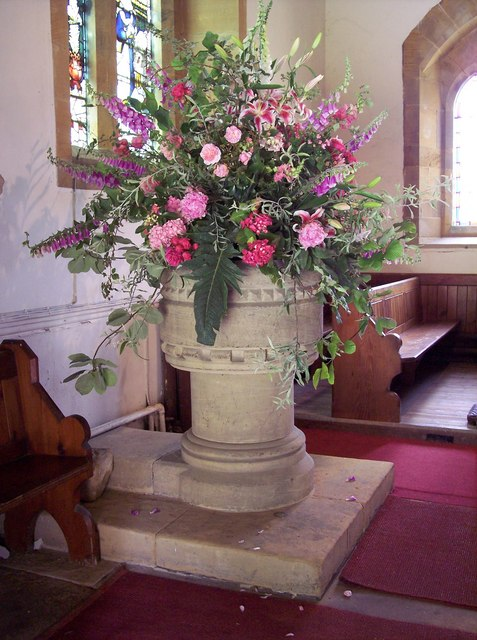
The font

The church is built of stone with a Welsh slate roof. It consists of a nave, a chancel with a north vestry and a southwest tower with a gabled south porch. The tower has two stages, a chamfered plinth, buttresses, slit vents, paired bell openings with impost bands, and a stepped embattled parapet on a dentilled base. The windows in the church are lancets, and the east window has three lancets under quatrefoils. Inside, there are 17th- and 18th-century brass memorials, a broken Mediaeval graveslab and some other Mediaeval stones. The font probably dates from the 17th century.

== See also ==
- Listed buildings in Kirby Knowle
