= Listed buildings in Thirlby =

Thirlby is a civil parish in the county of North Yorkshire, England. It contains three listed buildings that are recorded in the National Heritage List for England. All the listed buildings are designated at Grade II, the lowest of the three grades, which is applied to "buildings of national importance and special interest". The parish contains the village of Thirby and the surrounding countryside, and the listed buildings consist of two farmhouses and a cottage.

== Buildings ==
Name and location	Photograph	Date	Notes
Rose Cottage; 54.25013°N 1.24664°W	—	Early 18th century (probable)	The cottage is in stone, with quoins, and a pantile roof with plain kneelers. There are two low storeys and two bays. On the front is a doorway and horizontally sliding sash windows. At the rear is a plinth, an outshut, and a fragment of masonry with medieval decoration.
Hill House Farmhouse; 54.24930°N 1.25546°W	—	Mid to late 18th century	The farmhouse is in stone on a plinth, with quoins, and a pantile roof with shaped kneelers and stone coping. There are two storeys, two bays, and a rear wing and partial outshut. In the centre is a doorway with a tripartite lintel, and the windows are horizontal sliding sashes.
Kelmire Grange Farmhouse; 54.24561°N 1.26852°W	—	Late 18th century	The farmhouse is in stone on a chamfered plinth, and has a pantile roof with shaped kneelers and stone coping. There are two storeys and attics, three bays, and two rear wings with an outshut between. In the centre is a doorway with a fanlight, and the windows on the front are casements, most with lintels and keystones. Elsewhere, there are horizontally sliding sash windows.
