= Sutton-under-Whitestonecliffe =

Village and civil parish in North Yorkshire, England

Coordinates: 54.23749°N 1.26238°W

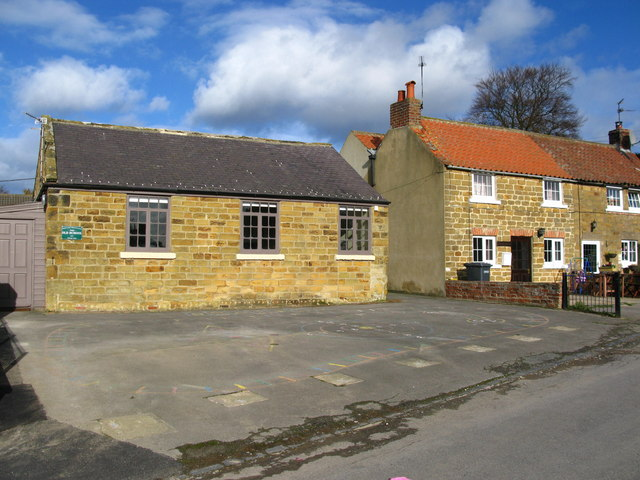
- Old School and School House, Sutton-under-Whitestonecliffe

- Location within North Yorkshire
- Population: 297 (Including Hood Grange. 2011 census)
- OS grid reference: SE481826
- Unitary authority: North Yorkshire
- Ceremonial county: North Yorkshire
- Region: Yorkshire and the Humber
- Country: England
- Sovereign state: United Kingdom
- Post town: THIRSK
- Postcode district: YO7
- Police: North Yorkshire
- Fire: North Yorkshire
- Ambulance: Yorkshire
- UK Parliament: Thirsk and Malton

Sutton-under-Whitestonecliffe is a village and civil parish in North Yorkshire, England. Historically part of the North Riding of Yorkshire, it is situated on the A170 at the foot of Sutton Bank, about three miles east of Thirsk.

== History ==
The name Sutton derives from the Old English sūðtūn meaning 'south settlement'.

The village is mentioned in the Domesday Book as Sudtune in the Yarlestre hundred. The manor was recorded as in the possession of Orm, son of Gamal, but was granted to Hugh, son of Baldric after the Norman invasion.

== Governance ==
The village lies within the Thirsk and Malton UK Parliament constituency. From 1974 to 2023 it was part of the Hambleton District, it is now administered by the unitary North Yorkshire Council.

The local Parish Council has six members including the chair.

== Geography ==
The village lies to the west of the limestone escarpment of Sutton Bank. The nearest settlements are Thirlby 1 mile (1.6 km) to the north; Bagby 2 miles (3.2 km) to the south west and Cold Kirby 3.2 miles (5.1 km) to the east. The low level geology of the area is of Devensian clay on beds of lower Jurassic lias. There is a small waterway, Sutton Beck, that is part of the tributary system that joins the River Swale near Topcliffe.

According to the 2001 UK Census the population was 268 of which 230 were over the age of sixteen and 149 of those were in employment. There were 143 dwellings of which 89 were detached.

The village holds the distinction of being the longest hyphenated place name in England with 29 characters.

== Notable buildings ==
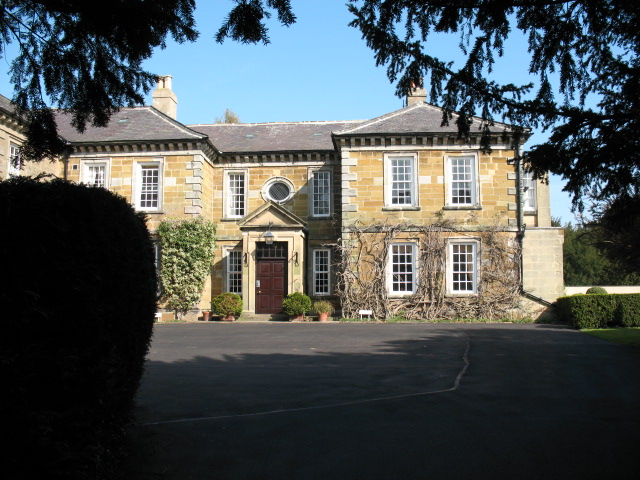
The 17th-century Sutton Hall

There are 11 Grade II Listed Buildings in or near the village, including two mileposts, the former post office and village store and the former Methodist church. The list also includes Sutton Hall, which was built in the 18th century and was the seat of the Smyth family until 1766. Sutton Hall is now used as timeshare holiday flats.
