= St Mary's Church, Ilkeston =

St Mary’s Church, Ilkeston
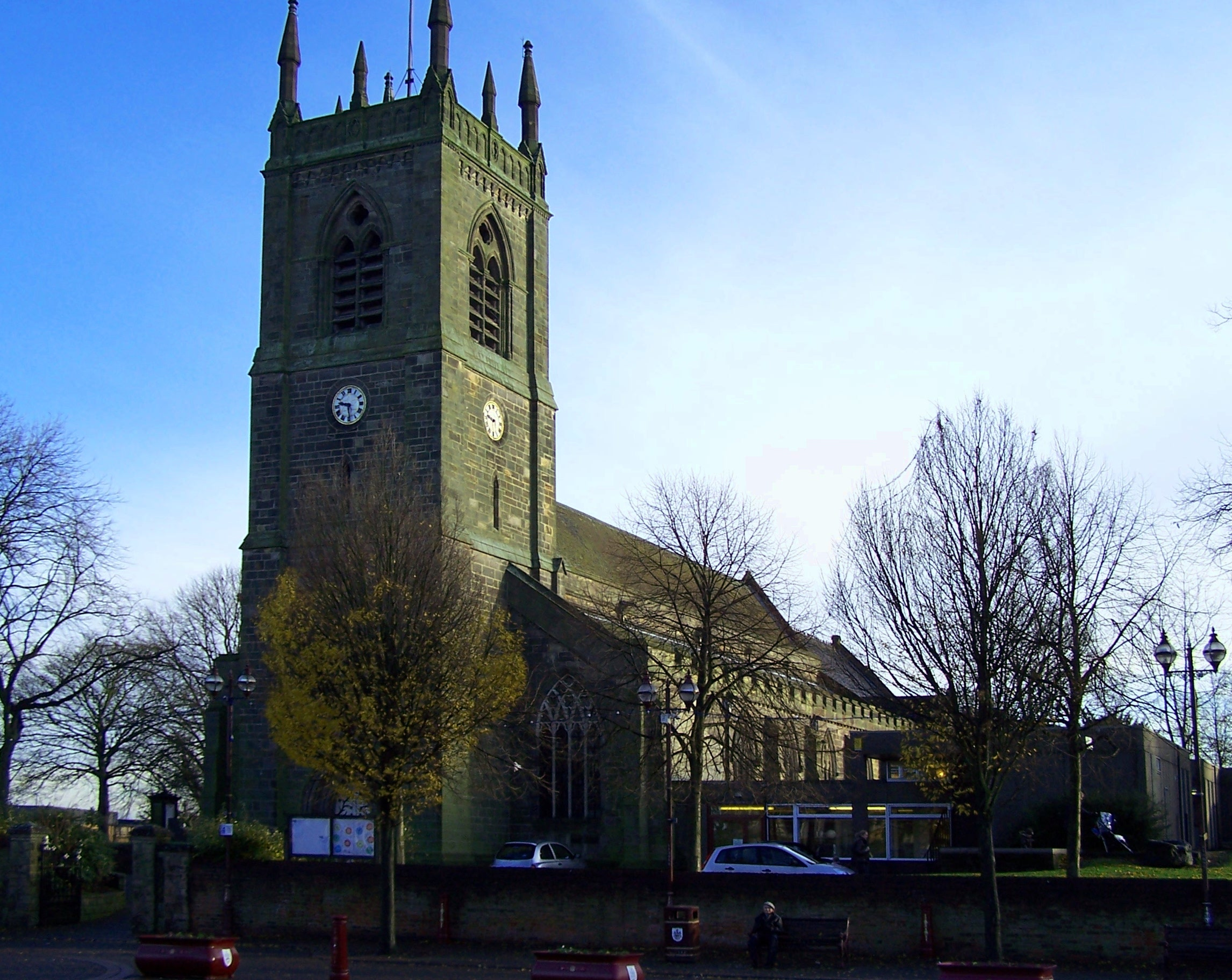
- St Mary’s Church, Ilkeston
- St Mary’s Church, Ilkeston
- 52°58′14.61″N 1°18′32.95″W
- OS grid reference: SK 46549 41739
- Location: Ilkeston
- Country: England
- Denomination: Church of England
- Website: stmarysilkeston.co.uk

History
- Dedication: St Mary

Architecture
- Heritage designation: Grade II* listed

Administration
- Diocese: Diocese of Derby
- Archdeaconry: Derby
- Deanery: Erewash
- Parish: Ilkeston

St Mary's Church, Ilkeston is a Grade II* listed parish church in the Church of England in Ilkeston, Derbyshire. Built in the 14th century, it is known as the "Mollis Chapel" because of a stained glass window which shows the rising sun above the cross which was fixed to it by the local saint.

== History ==
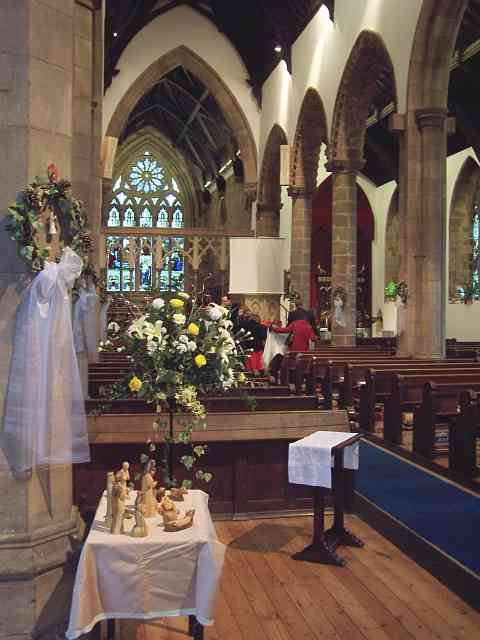
The nave

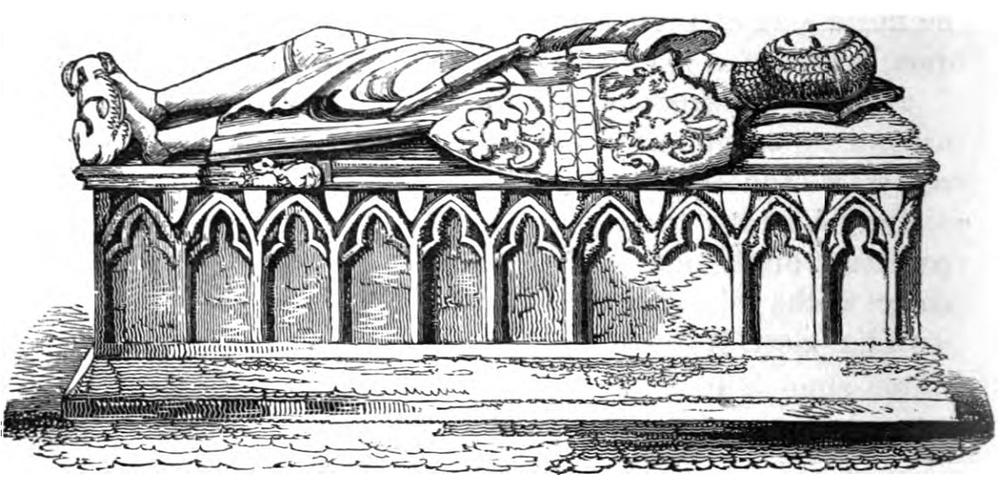
Recumbent effigy and chest tomb of Sir Nicholas de Cantilupe (d.1266), father of William de Cantilupe, 1st Baron Cantilupe (1262-1308); St Mary's Church, Ilkeston

The church was founded in 1150, the oldest visible part of the fabric being the three Norman arches in the south arcade which date from the close of the 12th century when the Norman Stye was changing into early English. An architectural report in 1855 said that no church in England possesses any equal to them and they can never be surpassed in the lightness of their tracery.

Also remarkable is the arcade between the chancel and Peter Chapel with its Early English Arches whose capitals are decorated with small bossy leaves in which can be seen the impish faces of the green men of the forest.

Between the chancel and the Peter Chapel is the recumbent stone effigy and chest tomb of Sir Nicholas de Cantilupe (d.1266) of Withcall in Lincolnshire, Greasley in Nottinghamshire and Ilkeston in Derbyshire, who married Eustachia FitzHugh, daughter and heiress of Ralph FitzHugh of Greasley. His son was William de Cantilupe, 1st Baron Cantilupe (1262-1308) of Greasley and of Ravensthorpe Castle in the parish of Boltby, North Yorkshire. The monument would once have stood in a central position and was mentioned as being in the chancel in 1662 and again in 1716.

The control of St Mary's was given to Dale Abbey, a nearby Praemonstratensian monastery, in the late middle ages. Gifts of this kind were strictly controlled by the Statutes of Mortmain because they had both financial and political implications for the monarchy, so ways had to be found to hide their true nature. On 12 July 1385, Richard II granted a licence for Hugh de Willoughby, a cleric, and five others, to alienate to Dale Abbey in mortmain the advowson or patronage of the church and also for the abbey to appropriate the church. The apparent donors were a group of feoffees, but these were a front for the man who then controlled St Mary's: William la Zouche, 3rd Baron Zouche, whose father had inherited it from the Cantilupe family. This becomes obvious in hindsight, as William had secured the spiritual advantages of his gift in advance, on 13 February: chantry masses and prayers at Dale Abbey for himself and his wife, Agnes, as well as for their parents and for William de Clinton, 1st Earl of Huntingdon and his wife Juliana de Leybourne. On 12 October he confirmed the transfer of the church, releasing it to the Abbey of "La Dale."

The transfer attracted attention. By 1394 the abbey church already had installed as vicar a canon of Dale called Hugo of Thurgarton: In that year Pope Boniface IX tried to impose on the parish John de Aston, formerly vicar of Colston Bassett, noting that the vicarage was worth 40 marks. This went against the clear terms of the Statute of Provisors, which prevented the pope from making such appointments. Aston's attempts to take over were regarded as vexatious litigation against the abbot and convent of Dale and he was imprisoned in the Fleet: he only got out in February 1398, after he had secured mainprise, a form of bail. He then seized the church, along with Henry, a chaplain, and six others. John Burghill, Bishop of Coventry and Lichfield, wrote to the king asking for the local secular powers to intervene. The gang were called before the bench of magistrates, with one, John Wylchar, another chaplain, failing to appear. The affair seems to come to an end only in Henry IV's reign, with Wylchar being pardoned in October 1402, after handing himself in at the Marshalsea Prison.

The manor of Ilkeston was granted Henry VII to John Savage (soldier) for his help in the Battle of Bosworth, as the 7th Baron Zouche had been dispossessed for siding with Richard III. This did not immediately affect the church, which remained in the hands of Dale Abbey until the Dissolution of the Monasteries. However, it placed the Savage family in a good position to acquire it in the subsequent disposal of the abbey's property. A later Sir John Savage was patron of the church in the Elizabethan Period. Thomas Savage, 1st Viscount Savage, sold the manor and the church to Sir John Manners in 1608. Grace, Lady Manners, the widow of Sir George Manners of Haddon Hall is recorded as presenting Thomas Lowe to the living in 1629, and his successor William Hope in 1633. Apparently not everyone found the Manners appointees satisfactory: under the Commonwealth of England in 1650 a parliamentary commission on the conduct of ministers pronounced the vicar, a Mr Fox, scandalous.

The spire on the tower was destroyed by a lightning strike in 1714.

It was extensively restored between 1853 and 1855 by Thomas Larkins Walker. The north and south aisles were rebuilt, and they were restored to their original length towards the west. The chantry chapel was rebuilt to accommodate nearly 300 children. The chancel arch was restored and the tower was re-cased. A new vestry was added on the foundations of the old sacristry, adjoining the south wall of the chapel. New seating and flooring was fitted, and new heating and lighting was installed. The contractor was Lindley and Fearn of Leicester. It was reopened on 18 October 1855.

The church was altered in 1889 and the west end was enlarged and rebuilt between 1909 and 1910 by Percy Heylyn Currey when the tower was removed stone by stone and rebuilt as it is seen today. It was reopened for worship on 20 September 1910 by the Bishop of Southwell.

== Organ ==
The church contains an organ by Bishop dating from 1831 which was originally in the church of St John the Evangelist in Paddington where it was reputedly played by Mendelssohn. A specification of the organ can be found on the National Pipe Organ Register.

=== Organists ===
- Cecil Wyer 1919 - ????
- Henry Hoggard Beaumont 1872-1919

== Bells ==
The church has eight bells (tenor 17cwt), which were recast by John Taylor of Loughborough in 1910. They underwent an extensive restoration, including rehanging, in 2015.

== See also ==
- Grade II* listed buildings in Erewash
- Listed buildings in Ilkeston
