= Listed buildings in Felixkirk =

Felixkirk is a civil parish in the county of North Yorkshire, England. It contains seven listed buildings that are recorded in the National Heritage List for England. Of these, two are listed at Grade II*, the middle of the three grades, and the others are at Grade II, the lowest grade. The parish contains the village of Felixkirk and the surrounding area, and the listed buildings consist of houses and associated structures, a church and a school converted into a village hall.

== Key ==
Grade	Criteria
II*	Particularly important buildings of more than special interest
II	Buildings of national importance and special interest

== Buildings ==
Name and location	Photograph	Date	Notes	Grade
Church of St Felix; 54.25637°N 1.28327°W		12th to 13th century	The church has been altered and extended through the centuries, and the apse was added in 1860. It is built in sandstone, with a lead roof on the chancel, and a stone slate roof elsewhere. The church consists of a nave, north and south aisles, a south porch, a chancel with an apse, and a west tower. The tower has two stages, diagonal buttresses, a three-light west window, a south clock face, two-light bell openings, and an embattled parapet. The west window in the south aisle is Norman, and in the chancel is a re-set Norman doorway.	II*
Mount St John; 54.25730°N 1.27508°W	—	1720	A large house that was extended in the 19th century. It is in sandstone, part of the extension is in brick, and it has a hipped Welsh slate roof. The earlier part has two storeys and the extension is partly in three storeys. The south front has a plinth, giant angle pilasters, a floor band, an eaves band, a moulded cornice, a panelled parapet with urns on the corners, and a pediment over the central bay. There are five bays, the middle bay projecting. In the centre is the former entrance, with a shouldered architrave and a cornice. The windows are sashes with keystones, the window above the entrance with a shouldered architrave and a moulded sill and apron. The west front has been extended to twelve bays, and on the east front is a Venetian window.	II*
Stable block, Mount St John; 54.25764°N 1.27461°W	—	1746	The stable block is in sandstone on a plinth, with stepped eaves and a hipped pantile roof. There are two storeys and seven bays. In the centre is a carriage entrance with a Gibbs surround and a fanlight incorporating a clock, and above it is a sundial. The outer bays contain two entrances with fanlights, fixed lights in the ground floor, horizontally-sliding sash windows in the upper floor, and all the openings have lintels and keystones.	II
High Anson House; 54.25554°N 1.28281°W	—	Late 18th century (probable)	The house is in red-brown brick with some sandstone at the rear, dentilled eaves and a swept pantile roof. There are two storeys, three bays, and a single-storey one-bay extension on the right. The central doorway has a flat gauged-brick arch, and the windows are horizontally-sliding sashes with rendered lintels.	II
Marderby Grange; 54.24573°N 1.27532°W	—	Early 19th century	The house is in pale brown brick and has a Welsh slate roof with stone coping and shaped kneelers. There are two storeys and three bays. The central doorway has reeded attached columns, an entablature, and an oblong fanlight with decorative glazing. The windows are sashes with architraves and gauged brick flat arches.	II
Richmond House; 54.25566°N 1.28295°W	—	Early 19th century	The house is in brick with a floor band, stepped and dentilled eaves, and a swept pantile roof with raised verges, stone coping, and shaped kneelers. There are two storeys and three bays. Steps lead to a central door and the windows are horizontally-sliding sashes, all under segmental brick arches.	II
Felixkirk School; 54.25559°N 1.28334°W		1885	The school, later the village hall, is in red brick with stone dressings, quoins, and a stone slate roof with raised verges and stone coped shaped gables. There is a single storey and three bays. The projecting porch contains a doorway with a chamfered surround, a Tudor arch and a hood mould, above which is a re-set dated plaque. It is flanked by windows with deeply chamfered surrounds, and in the returns are deeply chamfered mullioned and transomed windows.	II
