= Kirby Knowle =

Village and civil parish in North Yorkshire, England

Coordinates: 54°16′46″N 1°16′49″W

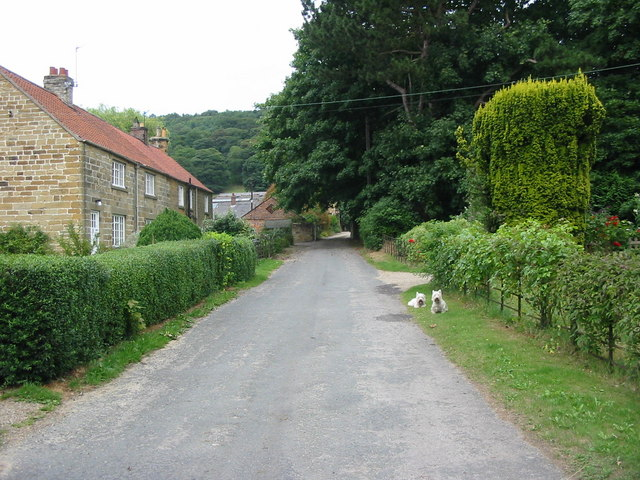
- Kirby Knowle

- Location within North Yorkshire
- Population: 60
- OS grid reference: SE469873
- Civil parish: Kirby Knowle
- Unitary authority: North Yorkshire
- Ceremonial county: North Yorkshire
- Region: Yorkshire and the Humber
- Country: England
- Sovereign state: United Kingdom
- Post town: Thirsk
- Postcode district: YO7
- Police: North Yorkshire
- Fire: North Yorkshire
- Ambulance: Yorkshire
- UK Parliament: Thirsk and Malton

Kirby Knowle is a village and civil parish in the county of North Yorkshire, England, on the border of the North Yorkshire Moors and near Upsall, about four miles northeast of Thirsk. Historically part of the North Riding of Yorkshire, the population of the civil parish was estimated at 60 in 2014.

== History ==
The village is mentioned in the Domesday Book as Chirchebi in the Yalestre hundred. The lands were in the possession of Orm, son of Gamal, but passed to Hugh, son of Baldric after the Norman invasion. The lands became the possession of Robert de Mowbray who granted tenancy to Baldwin le Wake and then to the Upsall family, eventually passing to the Lascelles family. The Lascelles built a castle here in the 13th century which burnt down in 1568. During this time the manor was in the hands of the Constable family. The Constables were Catholics and were dispossessed of the manor after the civil war.

A mile to the west of the village is Kirby Knowle Castle, a 17th-century house altered in the 19th century. An earlier house on the site belonged to Joseph Constable. He was a Catholic recusant and was arrested in the house on 6 March 1597 after a search was made of secret hiding places and underground passages.

== Governance ==
The village is within the Thirsk and Malton UK Parliament constituency. From 1974 to 2023 it was part of the Hambleton District, it is now administered by the unitary North Yorkshire Council.

The parish shares a grouped parish council, known as Hillside Parish Council, with the civil parishes of Boltby, Cowesby, Felixkirk and Upsall.

== Geography ==
The nearest settlements are Upsall 1.1 miles (1.8 km) to the west; Felixkirk 1.6 miles (2.6 km) to the south; Boltby 1.5 miles (2.4 km) to the southeast and Cowesby 1.5 miles (2.4 km) to the north.

The 1881 UK Census recorded the population as 114. The 2001 UK Census recorded the population as 68 of which 59 were over the age of sixteen years and of these 35 were in employment. There were 33 dwellings of which 24 were detached.

== Religion ==
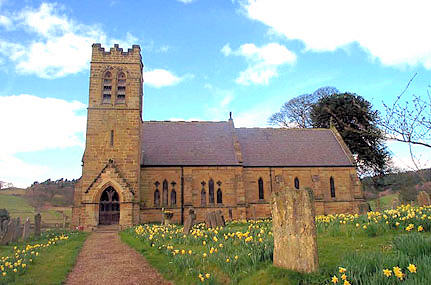
Saint Wilfrid's Church, Kirby Knowle

St Wilfrid's Church, Kirby Knowle is a Grade II listed building, rebuilt in 1873 on the site of the original.

== See also ==
- Listed buildings in Kirby Knowle
