= Listed buildings in Cold Kirby =

Cold Kirby is a civil parish in the county of North Yorkshire, England. It contains six listed buildings that are recorded in the National Heritage List for England. All the listed buildings are designated at Grade II, the lowest of the three grades, which is applied to "buildings of national importance and special interest". The parish contains the village of Cold Kirby and the surrounding area. All the listed buildings are in the centre of the village, and consist of houses, farmhouses and associated structures, and a church.

== Buildings ==
| Name and location | Photograph | Date | Notes |
|---|---|---|---|
| Middle Farmhouse; 54.25414°N 1.18467°W | — | 1753 | The house is in limestone, with sprocketed eaves, and a pantile roof with coped gables and shaped kneelers. There are two storeys and four bays. Above the doorway is an initialled datestone, and, apart from a fixed window, all the windows are casements with flat arches. |
| Coronation Farmhouse and barn 54.25350°N 1.18453°W | — | Mid to late 18th century | The farmhouse and later barn are in limestone, the house has a roof of French tile, and the barn has a pantile roof. The house has two storeys and two bays, sprocketed eaves, coped gables and shaped kneelers, and the barn has a single storey. Most of the windows are horizontally-sliding sashes, in the house is a fire window, and the barn has a fixed-light window. |
| Kirby House; 54.25424°N 1.18397°W | | c. 1800 | A limestone house with a swept pantile roof, two storeys, two bays, and a continuous rear outshut. The doorway is in the centre, and the windows are horizontally-sliding sashes with concrete lintels. |
| Northfield House; 54.25415°N 1.18449°W | — | Late 18th to early 19th century | The house is in limestone, and has a French tile roof with coped gables and shaped kneelers. There are two storeys and two bays. The doorway is in the centre, and the windows are horizontally-sliding sashes with stone lintels. |
| Hambleton House; 54.25410°N 1.18516°W | — | 1836 | The house is in limestone with an M-shaped pantile roof. There are two storeys, four bays, and a parallel rear range. The doorway has a cornice and a datestone above, and the windows are small-paned horizontally-sliding sashes. |
| St Michael's Church; 54.25351°N 1.18248°W | | 1841 | The church is in limestone, with dressings in sandstone and a Welsh slate roof. It consists of a nave, a south porch, a narrower chancel, and a west tower. The tower has two-light bell openings, and a plain parapet with short corner pinnacles. The windows on the body of the church have rusticated surrounds. |
