= Listed buildings in Cowesby =

Cowesby is a civil parish in the county of North Yorkshire, England. It contains seven listed buildings that are recorded in the National Heritage List for England. All the listed buildings are designated at Grade II, the lowest of the three grades, which is applied to "buildings of national importance and special interest". The parish contains the village of Cowesby and the surrounding countryside, and the listed buildings consist of houses and associated structures, farm buildings, a row of former almshouses, a church and a boundary stone.

== Buildings ==
Name and location	Photograph	Date	Notes
The Almhouses; 54.30209°N 1.28522°W	—	c. 1680	A row of four almshouses converted into a single dwelling in about 1980. It is in stone on a plinth, and has a pantile roof with stone coping, shaped kneelers and ball finials. There is a single storey and attics, and four bays. There are two sets of paired doorways with chamfered quoined surrounds, and triangular soffits to the lintels. These are flanked by two-light chamfered mullioned windows. In the roof at the rear are skylights.
Outbuilding south of The Almhouses; 54.30203°N 1.28537°W	—	c. 1680 (probable)	The outbuilding is in stone with pantile roofs. It consists of a two-storey cell, with a lower single-bay extension to the south. There is a doorway in the north gable, and a tall opening in the east side with a stone lintel.
Middle Cottage and Post Office Cottage; 54.30202°N 1.28564°W	—	Late 18th century	A house, later extended and divided into two, it is in stone with pantile roofs, stone coping and shaped kneelers. There are two storeys and five bays. On the front are two doorways, and the windows are a mix of horizontally-sliding sashes and later casements.
Barn, wheelhouse and cowhouse, Grange Farm; 54.30270°N 1.28665°W	—	Late 18th century	The farmbuildings are in stone with Welsh slate roofs, stone copings and shaped kneelers. They consist of a barn with six bays, an apisdal wheelhouse projecting from the left end, and a lower three-bay cowhouse to the right. The barn is on a plinth, and contains two segmental-arched wagon entries with quoined surrounds, voussoirs, slit vents and a sash window. The wheelhouse has a plinth, pilaster buttresses, and various openings, and the cowhouse contains a central stable door.
Rectory House; 54.29594°N 1.32440°W		Late 18th to early 19th century	The house, which was extended in the 20th century, is in stone, with quoins, and a pantile roof with stone copings and shaped kneelers. There are two storeys and three bays, and to the right is a lower three-bay extension. In the centre of the original part is a doorway, and the windows are sashes, those in the upper floor are horizontally-sliding.
Boundary stone 54.29594°N 1.32493°W		Early 19th century	The boundary stone by a road junction is a stone, with a square plan and a chamfered top. On two faces there are well-cut inscriptions.
St Michael's Church; 54.30303°N 1.28772°W		1846	The church, designed by Anthony Salvin in Norman style, is in stone with a stone slate roof. It consists of a three-bay nave, a south porch, a single-bay chancel, and a central tower. The tower has two stages, and contains two-light bell openings on the north and south sides, and single-light windows on the other sides. It is surmounted by a corbelled pyramidal roof with lucarnes and a weathervane. The windows in the body of the church and the doorways have round-arched heads.
