= St Michael's Church, Cowesby =

Church in Cowesby, North Yorkshire, England

Coordinates: 54°18′11″N 1°17′16″W

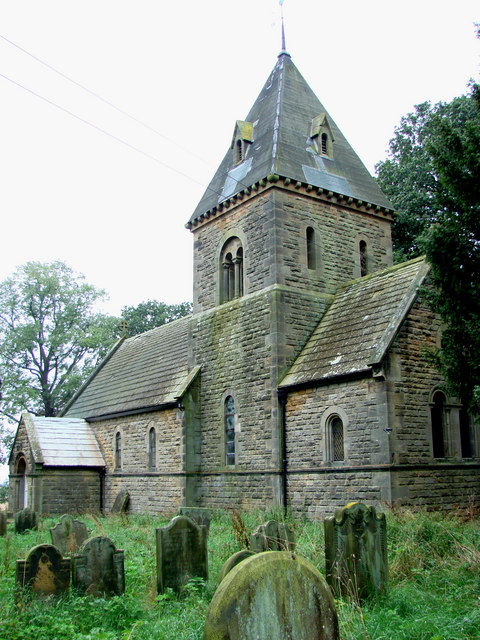
The church, in 2008

St Michael' Church is the parish church of Cowesby, a village in North Yorkshire, in England.

A church in Cowesby was first mentioned in 1227, and by the early 19th century, it was considered the second oldest in the district, after St Mary's Church, Leake. Despite this, it was demolished and a new church completed in 1846. It is in the Norman style, and was designed by Anthony Salvin. The building was Grade II listed in 1990.

The church is built of stone, with a stone slate roof. It consists of a three-bay nave, a south porch, a single-bay chancel, and a central tower. The tower has two stages, and contains two-light bell openings on the north and south sides, and single-light windows on the other sides. It is surmounted by a corbelled pyramidal roof with lucarnes and a weathervane. The windows in the body of the church and the doorways have round-arched heads. Inside, there is a 17th-century altar rail, and there are round-arched commandment tablets either side of the east window.

== See also ==
- Listed buildings in Cowesby
