= Listed buildings in Boltby =

Boltby is a civil parish in the county of North Yorkshire, England. It contains nine listed buildings that are recorded in the National Heritage List for England. All the listed buildings are designated at Grade II, the lowest of the three grades, which is applied to "buildings of national importance and special interest". The parish contains the village of Boltby and the surrounding countryside. The listed buildings consist of houses, farmhouses and farm buildings, a former mill house and associated structures, a footbridge, and a former office and blacksmith's shop.

== Buildings ==
Name and location	Photograph	Date	Notes
East Farmhouse; 54.27254°N 1.24671°W	—	1678	The farmhouse, which has been altered and extended, is in stone on a plinth, with quoins, and a roof of pantile and artificial slate with stone coping and shaped kneelers. There are two storeys and three bays, and a single-story bay added on the left. On the front is an elliptical-arched doorway with a moulded quoined surround, a keystone, and a lintel containing a date panel. Most of the windows are horizontally-sliding sashes. At the rear is a Tudor arched doorway and a mullioned window.
Raventhorpe Mill; 54.25775°N 1.24327°W	—	Early to mid 18th century	The mill house, later a private house, is in stone, with an eaves band, and a pantile roof with stone coping and shaped kneelers. There are two storeys and an attic, three bays, a lower wing on the left, a two-storey rear outshut, and a later single-storey bay. In the centre is a doorway and the windows are casements, all with lintels and keystones. In the attics are horizontally-sliding sash windows, and in the rear wing are dormers.
Bridge over Gurtoff Beck; 54.27278°N 1.24701°W		18th century	The bridge carries a footpath over the stream. It is in stone and consists of a single low segmental arch. The bridge has a peaked band, an iron-banded parapet with a rounded top, and end pilasters. It is approached by sloping stone causeways.
Housebrough; 54.26465°N 1.25850°W	—	Mid 18th century	A farmhouse, later divided into two, with an attached outbuilding, in stone, with a stone-coped pantile roof. There are two storeys, three bays, and a rear wing with an attic. In the centre is a doorway, and the windows are horizontally-sliding sashes. The outbuilding on the left has a single storey, and contains a stable door and a slatted window.
Garage range, Raventhorpe Mill; 54.25779°N 1.24359°W	—	Mid 18th century	Originally a barn and stable with a loft above, the building is in stone on a plinth, and has a pantile roof with stone coping and shaped kneelers. There are three bays, and a single storey with a loft over the right bay. It contains a sliding garage door, stable doors and a fixed-light window.
Outbuilding, Raventhorpe Mill; 54.25772°N 1.24365°W	—	Early 19th century (probable)	The building consists of a pair of pigsties with a hen-house above, and is in stone with a pantile roof. It contains a stable door and segmental-headed through-chutes, and in the right return is an arched bird hole.
West Acre Lodge; 54.26903°N 1.26315°W		Early 19th century	A farmhouse to which a rear wing was added, in stone, on a plinth, the original part has an artificial slate roof, and the wing has Welsh slate. There are two storeys and an attic, and a T-shaped plan with a main range of three bays, a rear wing, and an outshut in the angle. In the garden front is a central doorway with a fanlight, set in a recessed surround with pilasters, a cornice and panelled reveals. The windows on the front are sashes, and there are horizontally-sliding sashes at the rear.
Raventhorpe Manor; 54.27343°N 1.26329°W	—	1830s	A house that was later extended, in stone on a plinth, with a sill band, an eaves band, oversailing eaves and a blue slate roof. There are two storeys, three bays, a later two-bay block and a right rear wing. The middle bay of the main range projects, the ground floor is rusticated, and it contains a doorway with a dentilled cornice and a pediment. The windows are sashes with eared architraves and apron panels. In the extension are tripartite windows with cornices, the ground floor window with a frieze and a triangular pediment, and the upper floor window with corbels and a segmental pediment.
Boltby Reservoir Office and Blacksmith's Shop; 54.29031°N 1.23741°W		1880	The office and blacksmith's shop is timber framed, clad in bituminised plank and muntin, with a corrugated galvanized steel sheet roof, on a level earth-cut platform. There is a single story, a rectangular plan, and five bays, the office with two bays and the blacksmith's shop with three. On the front are doorways, a horizontally-sliding sash window and vents.
