= Cowesby =

Village and civil parish in North Yorkshire, England

Coordinates: 54°18′08″N 1°17′09″W

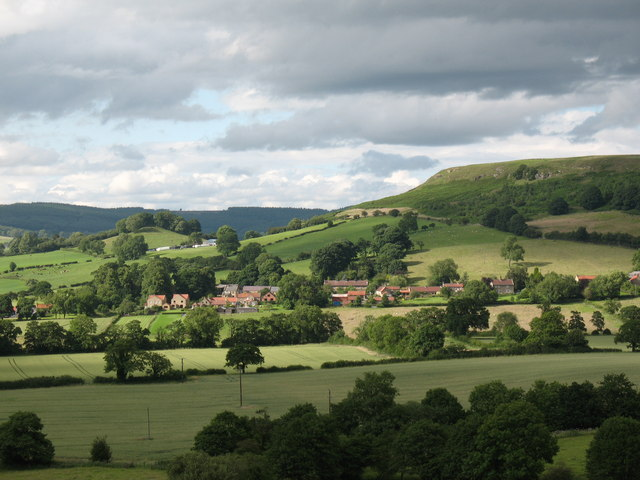
- Cowesby from the south

- Location within North Yorkshire
- Population: 70
- OS grid reference: SE 4656 8983
  - London: 231 miles (372 km)
- Civil parish: Cowesby
- Unitary authority: North Yorkshire
- Ceremonial county: North Yorkshire
- Region: Yorkshire and the Humber
- Country: England
- Sovereign state: United Kingdom
- Post town: THIRSK
- Postcode district: YO7
- Police: North Yorkshire
- Fire: North Yorkshire
- Ambulance: Yorkshire
- UK Parliament: Thirsk and Malton
- Website: http://www.thirsk.org.uk/cowesby/

Cowesby is a village and civil parish in the county of North Yorkshire, England. Part of the village including The Cowesby Hall Estate is within the North York Moors National Park and about 7 miles (11 km) north of Thirsk. The population of the civil parish was estimated at 70 in 2014.

== History ==
The name Cowesby derives from the Old Norse Kausibȳ meaning 'Kausi's village'.

The village is mentioned in the Domesday Book as being in the Allerton Hundred and listed as Cahosbi. At the time of the Norman invasion the lands were recorded as belonging to Edwin, Earl of Mercia, but were ceded soon afterwards to King William I, though the manor was in the hands of Hugh, son of Baldric.

== Governance ==
The village lies within the Thirsk and Malton UK Parliament constituency. From 1974 to 2023 it was part of the Hambleton District, it is now administered by the unitary North Yorkshire Council.

The parish shares a grouped parish council, known as Hillside Parish Council, with the civil parishes of Boltby, Felixkirk, Kirby Knowle and Upsall.

== Geography ==
According to the 2001 UK Census, the population was 60. There are no local amenities or access to public transport.

The village lies at the foot of the Hambleton Hills in a natural, and thus sheltered bend The nearest settlements are Kepwick, 0.6 miles (1.0 km) to the north-north-east; Kirby Knowle, 1.6 miles (2.6 km) to the south and Knayton and Borrowby 2.2 miles (3.5 km) to the south-west.

== The Cowesby Hall Estate ==
Cowesby Hall sits around half-a-mile from the centre of the village, the large Tudor-style country house sits prominently atop a hill in the centre of its 1,300 acre estate and was erected in 1832 from the designs of Anthony Salvin, the hall and the majority of its land falls within the North York Moors National Park. The present manor house is believed to be the 4th built on the site, with the first documented to have being built in the 12th century for William de Stuteville, whose son Robert died without issue, by the end of the 17th century, the manor was under the ownership of Nathaniel Crew, 3rd Baron Crew, who is also noted as the founder of Cowesby Hospital, a village-hospital built in the late 1700s to treat the impoverished estate workers.

By the early 1800s the manor was under ownership of George Lloyd, Esq, who built the present hall between 1828 and 1832, he died in 1844 and left the estate to his eldest son William, whose son, also called William was Lord of the Manor until the 1940s, when the hall and estate was purchased by Sir John Watson Cameron, the son of Watson Cameron of Camerons Brewery, it remained in ownership of the Camerons until 1999, when it was purchased by Robert Adair, a Yorkshire-based oil tycoon and his wife Lucy, a solicitor, the Adair's later divorced, which resulted in the £10m sale of The Cowesby Hall Estate in 2009 to a member of the billionaire Morrisons family, the sale included the main house, several estate cottages in the adjoining village, two working farms and 1,298 acres of land, including woodland, parkland, farmland and moorland.

The 24,000 square foot, 10-bedroom manor house and its sprawling gardens have undergone an extensive renovation and restoration programme by its current owners, the hall sits prominently atop a hill and is sheltered on the north and east facade, whilst the south and west facade enjoy expansive and far reaching views over the Hambleton Hills.

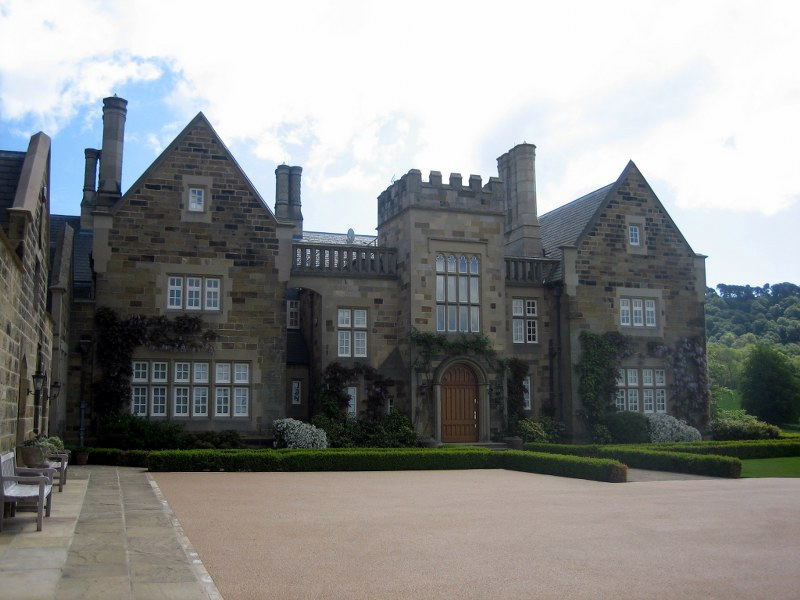
Cowesby Hall c. 2010

== Religion ==
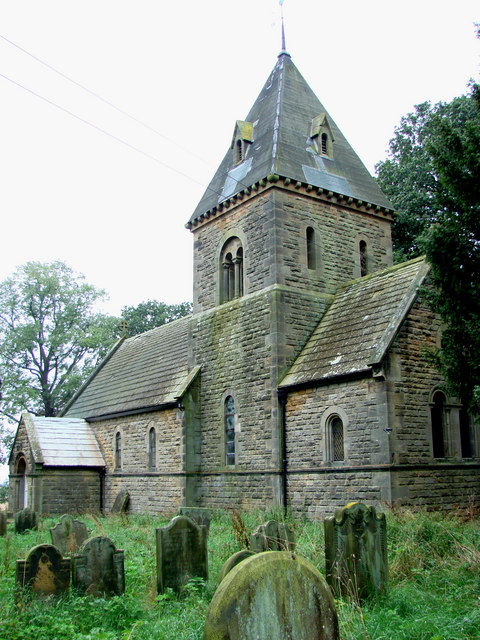
The Church of St Michael and All Angels, Cowesby

St Michael's Church, Cowesby was rebuilt by the widow of George Lloyd of Cowesby Hall to the designs of Anthony Salvin in 1846 on the site of a Saxon and a 13th-century church. The church is now a Grade II listed building.

== See also ==
- Listed buildings in Cowesby
