= Boltby =

Village and civil parish in North Yorkshire, England

Coordinates: 54.27281°N 1.24743°W

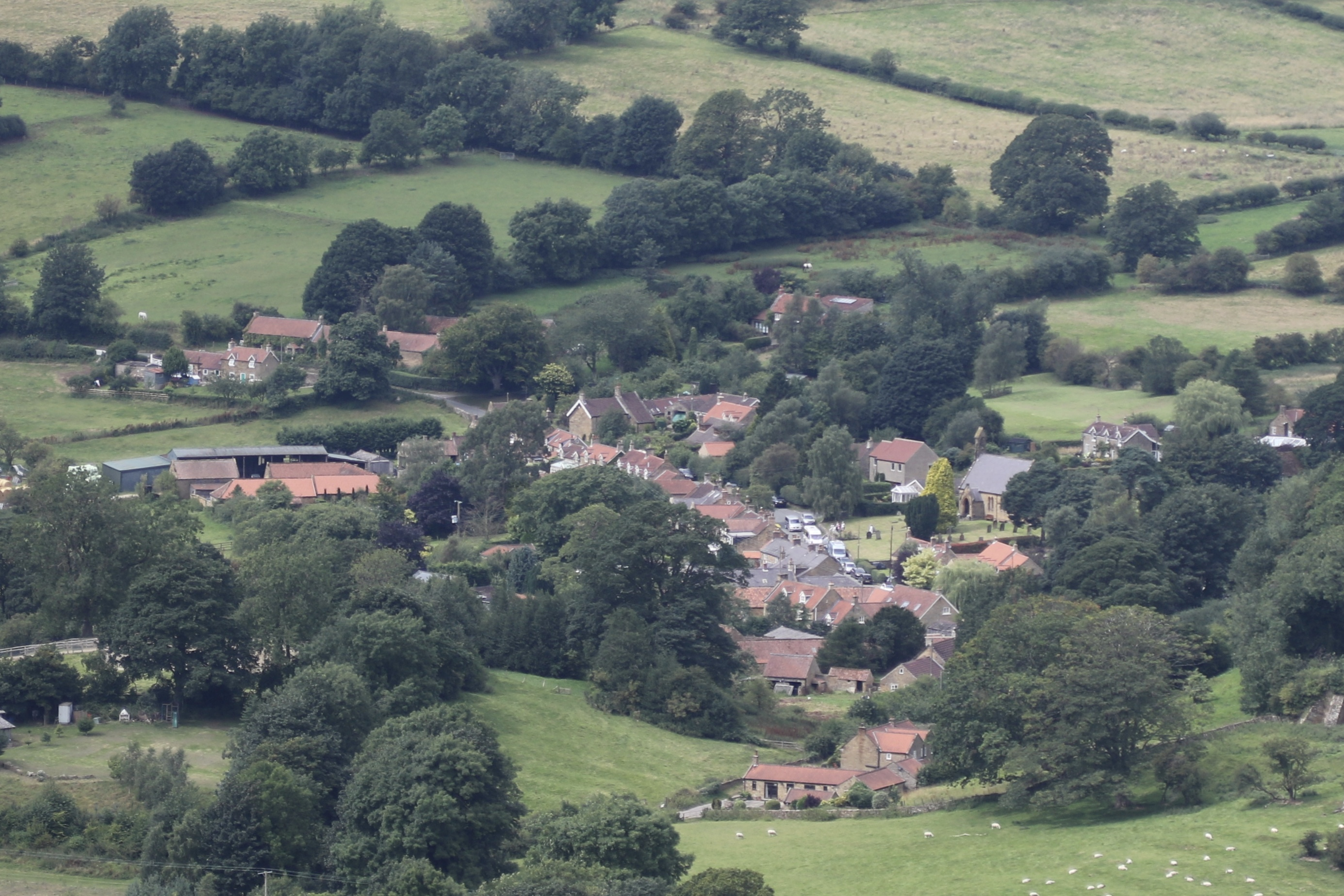
- Village of Boltby from the Cleveland Way

- Location within North Yorkshire
- Population: 143 (2011 census)
- OS grid reference: SE491866
- Civil parish: Boltby
- Unitary authority: North Yorkshire
- Ceremonial county: North Yorkshire
- Region: Yorkshire and the Humber
- Country: England
- Sovereign state: United Kingdom
- Post town: THIRSK
- Postcode district: YO7
- Police: North Yorkshire
- Fire: North Yorkshire
- Ambulance: Yorkshire
- UK Parliament: Thirsk and Malton

Boltby is a village and civil parish in the county of North Yorkshire, England. The village is on the edge of the North York Moors National Park at 460 feet (140 m), and about six miles (9.7 km) north-east of Thirsk. According to the 2011 census, it had a population of 143.

There are nine grade II listed structures in the civil parish including a bridge over Gurtof Beck. Ravensthorpe Manor House, built in the mid 19th century, is situate 0.5 miles (0.8 km) west of the village.

== History ==
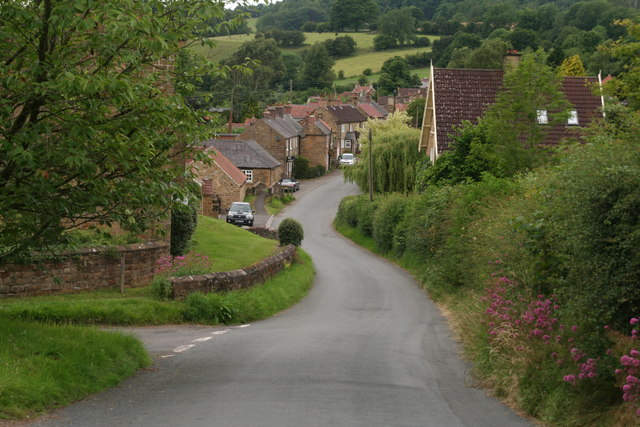
Boltby, 2014

The name Boltby derives from the Old Norse Boltibȳ meaning 'Bolti's village'.

Boltby is mentioned in the Domesday Book as Boltebi in the Yalestre hundred. After the Norman invasion, the land was owned by Hugh, son of Baldric. He granted Lordship of the local manor to Gerald of Boltby. Previously the Lord of the manor was Sumarlithi, son of Karli.

The eastern part of the Boltby was affected by flooding in 2005 when Gurtof Beck overflowed and damaged or destroyed buildings. Local reports were of water levels up to 3 metres (9.8 ft) deep.

== Governance ==
The village lies within the Thirsk and Malton UK Parliament constituency. It was in the North Riding of Yorkshire until 1974, when it was transferred to the new county of North Yorkshire. From 1974 to 2023 it was part of the Hambleton District. It is now administered by the unitary North Yorkshire Council.

The village and the eastern part of the civil parish is within the North York Moors National Park, which is responsible for some local government functions.

The parish shares a grouped parish council, known as Hillside Parish Council, with the civil parishes of Cowesby, Felixkirk, Kirby Knowle and Upsall.

== Geography ==
According to the 1881 UK Census, the population was 317. The 2001 UK Census recorded the population as 149, of which 124 were over the age of sixteen with 81 in employment. There are 70 dwellings of which 52 are detached. The population at the 2011 Census had reduced slightly to 143.

The low level geology of the area is of Devensian clay on beds of lower Jurassic lias.

The village lies 1.4 miles (2.3 km) west of the Cleveland Way National Trail.

The village is located 1.3 miles (2.1 km) south-east of Kirby Knowle; 1.8 miles (2.9 km) north-east of Felixkirk; 1.6 miles (2.6 km) north of Thirlby and 3 miles (4.8 km) north-west of Cold Kirby which are the nearest settlements.

== Religion ==
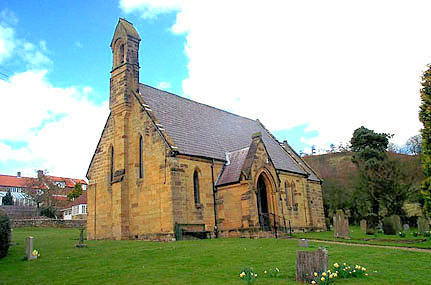
Holy Trinity Church, Boltby

There is one church in the village, dedicated to the Holy Trinity. This present building was constructed c. 1856 on the site of 1409 and 1802 structures. Parish registers date from around 1600.

== Ravensthorpe ==
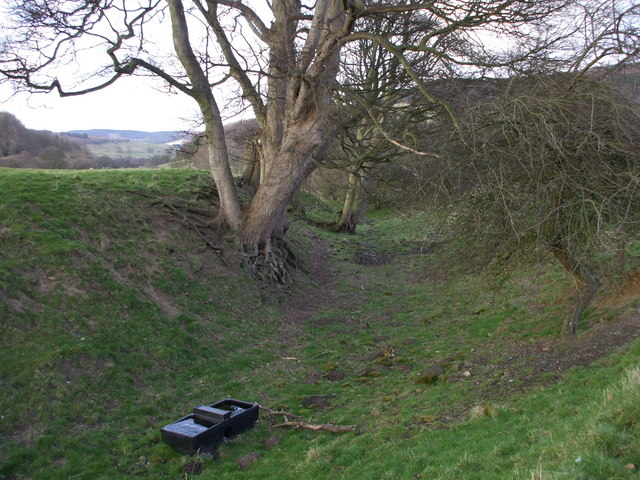
Remnant of the Medieval moat of Ravensthorpe Castle

About 1.0 mile (1.6 km) south of the village and to the immediate north-west of Tang Hall Farm (also known as Ravensthorpe Mill), is the site of the mediaeval moated castle or fortified manor house of Ravensthorpe, listed three times as a subsidiary manor in the Domesday Book of 1086, as Ravenestorp and Ravenetorp. In 1272 it consisted of a capital messuage and six tofts, with a watermill. The manorial mill survives as Ravensthorpe Mill. William de Cantilupe, 1st Baron Cantilupe (1262–1308) signed and sealed the Barons' Letter of 1301 as Willelmus de Cantilupo, Dominus de Ravenesthorp. He had inherited the manor on his second marriage, to Eve de Bolteby, second daughter and co-heiress of Adam de Bolteby of Ravensthorpe and Boltby and of Langley in Northumberland, and widow successively of Alan de Walkingham (d.1283) of Cowthorpe, Yorkshire and Richard Knout (d.1291). Cantilupe's other seats included Greasley in Nottinghamshire; Ilkeston in Derbyshire and Middle Claydon in Buckinghamshire. His inquisition post mortem of 1308 records that his manor of Ravensthorpe contained 24 bovates of demesne land; one free tenant; 29 cottars; five bondmen holding four bovates each, and three holding three bovates each. The watermill was worth £5 per annum. In 1362, on the death of Joan (widow of Sir William de Kyme), second wife and widow of Nicholas de Cantilupe, 3rd Baron Cantilupe (d.1355), Ravensthorpe passed under an entail to Sir William de Cantilupe (1344–1375), the younger of the two sons of William de Cantilupe, 4th Baron Cantilupe (1325–1375). On the death of Sir William de Cantilupe in 1375, Ravensthorpe passed to Sir Robert de Ros of Ingmanthorpe, from whom it escheated to the crown in 1377, passing in purparties to William la Zouche the younger and Sir Reynold Grey of Ruthin, in 1390 and 1391 respectively.

== Boltby Reservoir ==
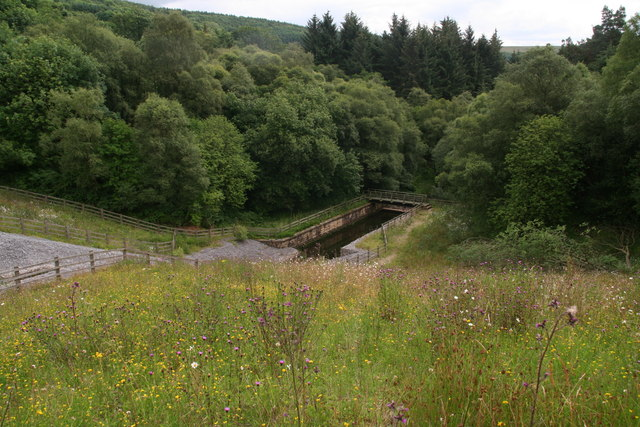
Outlet from former Boltby Reservoir, 2014

Boltby Reservoir is 1.2 miles (1.9 km) north-west of Boltby village and opened in 1882. It is 14.1 metres (46 ft) deep and covers an area of 3.1 hectares (7.7 acres) collecting water from a catchment area of 3.41 square kilometres (1.32 sq mi).

The reservoir was originally constructed on Ravensthorpe Estate by Thirsk and District Water Company to supply Thirsk, Thirsk railway station, Northallerton railway station and Romanby. Romanby's water flowed through a pipe laid alongside the railway line from Thirsk and was supplied separately from the remainder of Northallerton for many years. Thirsk and District Water Company subsequently enlarged the original reservoir and distribution network of pipes to supply other villages, and the airfields established around Thirsk during World War II.

A 1964 water quality emergency caused by absent filter beds required police be despatched across the supply area warning residents not to drink the unsafe Boltby water. Supply ceased to be drawn from the reservoir and operation / ownership was involuntarily transferred to Ryedale Joint Water Board. As of 2012, remaining operation of the facility is in the hands of Ryedale Joint Water Board's successor, Yorkshire Water.

Although now without a public house, the village had four during construction of the reservoir leading to incidents of unrest on site.

A legacy of late 19th century negotiations to construct the reservoir is an obligation upon successor water companies to provide a free water supply in perpetuity to Boltby residents.

== See also ==
- Listed buildings in Boltby
