= Upsall Castle =

Masonry Castle in North Yorkshire, England

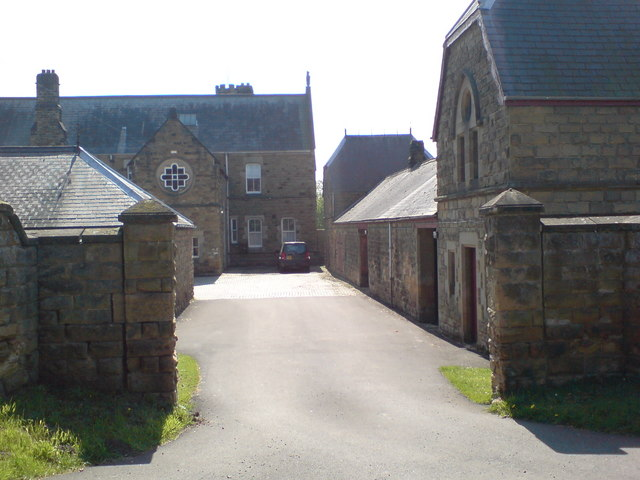
- "Upsall Castle" entrance, 2007
- Interactive map of Upsall Castle
- Type: Masonry Castle
- Location: Upsall, North Yorkshire
- Coordinates: 54.27536°N 1.30092°W
- Area: 5,525 m^{2}
- Built: 1327
- Owner: Gerald Turton

Upsall Castle is a fourteenth-century ruin, park and manor house in Upsall, near to Thirsk, in North Yorkshire, England.

== History ==
Some records state that there was a building of some construction on the site of the castle in 1130 and used by Roger De Mowbray. The earliest extant building on the site is the ruin of a quadrangular castle, probably begun in 1327 by Geoffrey Scrope, which was reputedly demolished in the Civil War. His son, Henry continued the building work. The last mention in records of the castle are in 1660.

Surveys revealed that the part of the southeast tower (Kitchen Tower) remained, as did the foundations for the south and west walls. The north and eastern structures of the old castle now lie beneath ground level. Mason markings are still visible, including the faded arms of the Scrope family. The castle, the old Gatehouse located west of the present day Garden Cottage and the remains of the old castle walls are all listed monuments. This castle was replaced by a manor house, which was rebuilt in the 19th century and then rebuilt again following destruction by fire in 1918.

The castle was part of the manor of the Scrope family until 1520, when it passed to Elizabeth, the daughter of Thomas Scrope, wife of Sir Ralph Fitz Randolph. It then passed again via his daughter, Agnes, to her son Christopher Wyvill, son of Ripon MP, Sir Marmaduke Wyvill. After this it passed to the Crown in 1577, before coming into the hands of the Constable family. They held it until 1768 when it was purchased briefly by William Chapman who sold it the Turton family.

In August 1609, Stephen Proctor and Timothy Whittingham captured three priests, including John Mush and Matthew Flathers in the castle vaults. The third priest escaped.

By 1828, "the little that remains" of the castle had been "converted into a farm-house and offices."

== Legends ==
John Constable, who resided at the castle in 1610, was a supporter of the Royal cause during the Civil War. The 19th-century writers William Grainge and John Gilbert Baker noted that he reportedly left a curse on any owner of Upsall who should prove disloyal to his king and country. The writers also recounted a folklore story of a man who dug under a bush at Upsall Castle, finding a pot of gold; later on, a stranger revealed to him that there was another pot of gold buried under the first, which he then dug up as well.

== See also ==
- Listed buildings in Upsall
