= Upsall =

Hamlet and civil parish in North Yorkshire, England

Coordinates: 54.27665°N 1.30582°W

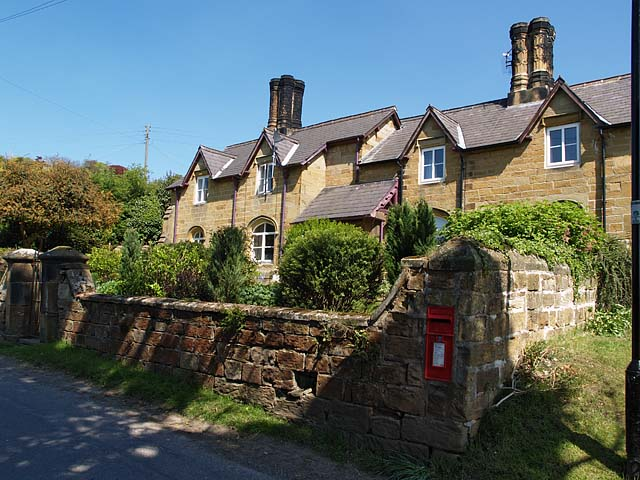
- Sandstone cottages in Upsall

- Location within North Yorkshire
- Population: 60
- OS grid reference: SE453870
- Unitary authority: North Yorkshire
- Ceremonial county: North Yorkshire
- Region: Yorkshire and the Humber
- Country: England
- Sovereign state: United Kingdom
- Post town: THIRSK
- Postcode district: YO7
- Dialling code: 01845
- Police: North Yorkshire
- Fire: North Yorkshire
- Ambulance: Yorkshire
- UK Parliament: Thirsk and Malton

Upsall is a hamlet in and civil parish in the county of North Yorkshire, England. It is situated approximately four miles north-east of Thirsk. Upsall is part of the Upsall and Roxby estates owned by the Turton family. The population of the civil parish was estimated at 60 in 2014.

== History ==
The village is mentioned in two entries of the Domesday Book as Upsale in the Yarlestre hundred. Lands at the time of the Norman invasion were in the possession of Earl Waltheof, but soon passed to the Crown from whence it was granted to Count Robert of Mortain. Some of the land was held for him by Richard of Soudeval. The lands passed to Robert de Mowbray, for whom the local Upsall family held the manor until 1327 when they were sold to Geoffrey Scrope. For a short while, the estates were Crown property before being granted to John Farnham in 1577. Thereafter, the lands passed through the Constable family to the Turtons in 1768.

The name Upsall is thought to derive from the Viking Upsal-ir, meaning high dwellings or high halls. The meaning is thus identical to Uppsala in Sweden.

== Governance ==
The village lies within Thirsk and Malton UK Parliament constituency. From 1974 to 2023 it was part of the Hambleton District, it is now administered by the unitary North Yorkshire Council.

The parish shares a grouped parish council, known as Hillside Parish Council, with the civil parishes of Boltby, Cowesby, Felixkirk and Kirby Knowle.

== Geography ==
The nearest settlements are Knayton 1.24 miles (2 km) to the north-west; Kirby Knowle 1.1 miles (1.8 km) to the east and Felixkirk 1.66 miles (2.67 km) to the south.

Upsall is home to a rare breed of cows called Upsall Polled Shorthorns. The herd was established in 1909 and narrowly escaped the 2001 outbreak of foot-and-mouth disease.

The National Cycle Network route 65A (Yorkshire Moors & Coast) passes through Upsall village.

== Religion ==
A Wesleyan chapel was erected in the village in 1887, but is now disused.

== Notable buildings ==
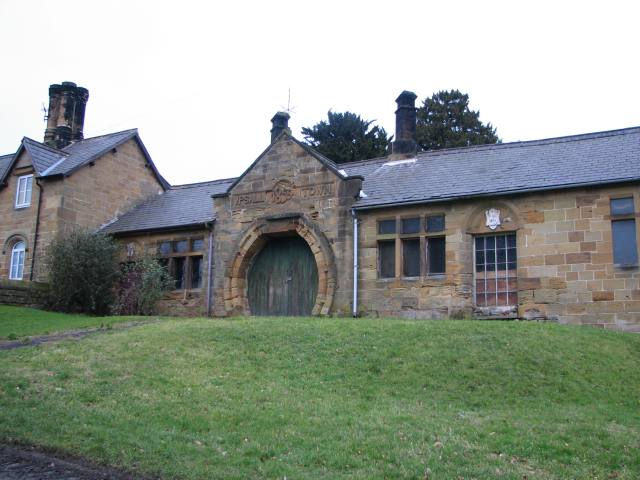
Upsall, The Old Forge

Upsall Castle lies near the middle of the village. The 19th-century building was destroyed by fire in 1918 and rebuilt in 1922. The original Upsall castle dated from the 14th century, and was rebuilt by the Scrope family. The Legend of Upsall Castle is associated with the original castle.

Upsall has some notable architecture. The old forge, with the words Upsall Town and the date 1859 inscribed above its horseshoe arch, lies in the centre of the village. Castle Farm is a Grade II listed structure and most of the buildings in Upsall are constructed from sandstone extracted from the old quarry. The abandoned Methodist chapel is one of the few brick-built buildings in Upsall.

Nevison Hall is reputed to be the birthplace and sometime residence of the highwayman, Will Nevison, also known as Swift Nick.

== Folklore ==
Upsall is one of the many locations for The Man Who Became Rich through a Dream folk tale (Aarne-Thompson type 1645). The tale tells of an Upsall man who dreamed for several nights that if he stood on London Bridge he would hear good news. He travelled to the bridge and told his story to a Londoner, who laughed, saying that he had dreamed for several nights about buried treasure located in Upsall, Yorkshire. The Upsall man returned home, and found the treasure.
