= Mount St. John Preceptory =

Monastery in North Yorkshire, England

Coordinates: 54°15′25.1″N 1°16′30.9″W

Mount St. John Preceptory was a preceptory of the Knights Hospitallers near Felixkirk in North Yorkshire, England.

== History ==
A preceptory to the honour of St. Mary was founded near Feliskirk early in the reign of Henry I when the Knights Hospitallers were given five knight's fees by William Percy I. The Hospitallers also obtained soon the advowson of the church there, and Robert Fossard acknowledged their right to it in 1210. In 1279 a vicarage was ordained, and the church was appropriated to the Hospitallers. The buildings were recorded as ruinous in 1338. At that time, the total receipts amounted to about 87½ marks. The church of Feliskirk contributed £26 to this sum, while voluntary offerings made in the district came to £13 6s. 8d. Both the preceptor and one confrater were chaplains. The foundation ordinances required the order to maintain hospitality and to make two distributions to the poor per year. The total deductions and expenses amounted to 37 marks. Including property in Westmorland and Northumberland, the gross value of the commandery in 1535 came to £137 2s, the clear value to £102 13s. 9d. Collections in Northumberland amounted to £9, similar collections in Yorkshire to £8.

After suppression, the buildings passed into the hands of the Archbishop of York. They were pulled down in 1720, and a manor house was built in their stead which is still known as Mount St John. It has been a grade II* listed building since 1978. Its stable block has also been listed at grade II since 1984.

Among the Preceptors of Mount St. John were (incomplete list in the order of their occurrence in documents):

- William de Reding
- John de Thame, named 1338
- Richard de Quertone, named 1365
- John Kylquyt, named 1415
- Thomas Pemberton, named 1528 and 1534
- Richard Broke, named 1539 and 1540
