= Cold Kirby =

Village and civil parish in North Yorkshire, England

Coordinates: 54°15′N 1°11′W

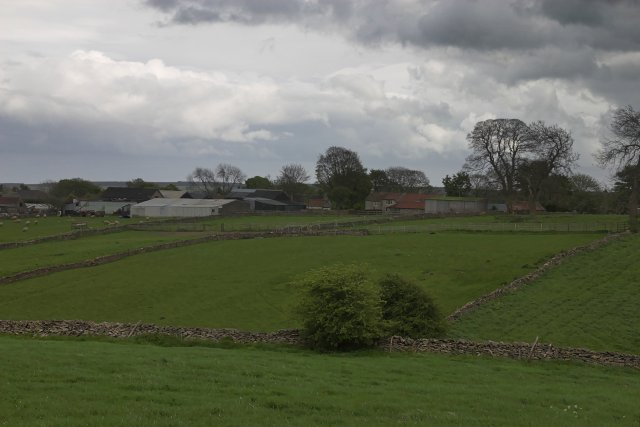
Cold Kirby

Cold Kirby is a village and civil parish in North Yorkshire, England. It is in the Hambleton Hills, near Rievaulx Abbey and Sutton Bank, 5 miles (8 km) west of Helmsley. The name Kirby derives from the Old Norse Kaeribȳ meaning 'Kaeri's village'.

The Cleveland Way long distance footpath passes through both civil parish and village on its way from Helmsley and Rievaulx to Sutton Bank and, eventually, Filey. The upper section of Sutton Bank is also in the civil parish. The whole civil parish lies within the North York Moors National Park.

From 1974 to 2023, the civil parish was part of the district of Ryedale. It is now administered by the unitary North Yorkshire Council. The population of the civil parish at the time of the 2011 census (including Angram Grange) was 205.

== See also ==
- Listed buildings in Cold Kirby
