= Felixkirk =

Village and civil parish in North Yorkshire, England

Coordinates: 54°15′20″N 1°17′01″W

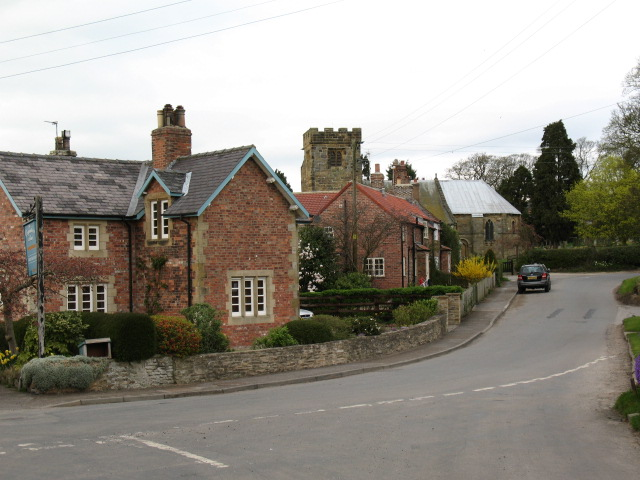
- Village Street, Felixkirk

- Location within North Yorkshire
- Population: 100
- OS grid reference: SE468438
- Civil parish: Felixkirk
- Unitary authority: North Yorkshire
- Ceremonial county: North Yorkshire
- Region: Yorkshire and the Humber
- Country: England
- Sovereign state: United Kingdom
- Post town: Thirsk
- Postcode district: YO7
- Police: North Yorkshire
- Fire: North Yorkshire
- Ambulance: Yorkshire
- UK Parliament: Thirsk and Malton

Felixkirk is a village and civil parish in the county of North Yorkshire, England. The village is situated about three miles north-east of Thirsk. The population of the civil parish was estimated at 100 in 2014.

== History ==
The village is named after its church, itself dedicated to St Felix, a Burgundian who travelled with St Paulinus converting Saxons in England to Christianity during the seventh century. It may have not been known by its current name at the time of the Norman invasion as it does not appear in this form in the Domesday Book of 1086. Instead it is referenced as Fridebi with the manor lands shared between Gamal, son of Kalri and Ligulf, subsequently passing after invasion to Hugh, son of Baldric, who made Gerard of Boltby lord of the manor.

There are competing etymologies for Fridebi. It is the same as the old place name of nearby Firby sometimes taken to mean Peaceful Place from fred, a Danish word for peace. Alternatively, like other hamlets with Danish derived names it might mean Freda's dwelling where the personal name Freda also means Peace.

Nearby hill, Mount St John, was the location of a preceptory of the Order of St John of Jerusalem built in the 11th century. After the Dissolution of the Monasteries, the preceptory buildings were handed to the Archbishop of York. In 1720, the buildings were pulled down and a new manor house was built. Still known as Mount St John, it is a grade II* listed building.

== Governance ==
The village is within the Thirsk and Malton UK Parliament constituency. From 1974 to 2023 it was part of the Hambleton District, it is now administered by the unitary North Yorkshire Council.

The parish shares a grouped parish council, known as Hillside Parish Council, with the civil parishes of Boltby, Cowesby, Kirby Knowle and Upsall.

== Geography ==
The village is at an elevation of 433 feet (132 m) above sea level at its highest point. The nearest settlements are Thirlby 1.3 miles (2.1 km) to the east; Sutton-under-Whitestonecliffe 1.7 miles (2.7 km) to the south-east; Upsall 1.6 miles (2.6 km) to the north; Boltby 1.9 miles (3.1 km) to the north-east and Thirsk 2.71 miles (4.36 km) to the south-west.

According to the 1881 UK Census, the population was 113. The 2001 UK Census recorded the population as 104, of which 85 were over the age of sixteen. Of those, 56 were in employment. The village contains 45 dwellings of which 24 are detached properties.

A bowl barrow at Howe Hill in the parish is a scheduled ancient monument. There are two Grade II* listed buildings (St Felix church and Mount St John) in the village and five Grade II listed structures.

== Education ==
Primary education is provided at nearby Thirsk Community, South Kilvington CE Primary and Knayton CE Primary Schools. These schools are within the catchment area of Thirsk School for secondary education.

== Religion ==
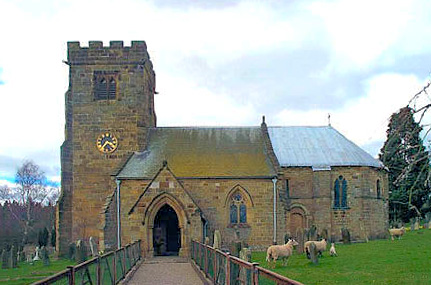
Church of St Felix

The village church is dedicated to St Felix and was substantially rebuilt in 1860 by William Hey Dykes, who is responsible for the unusual rounded apse. It is a grade II* listed building.

== See also ==
- Listed buildings in Felixkirk
