= Rossway =

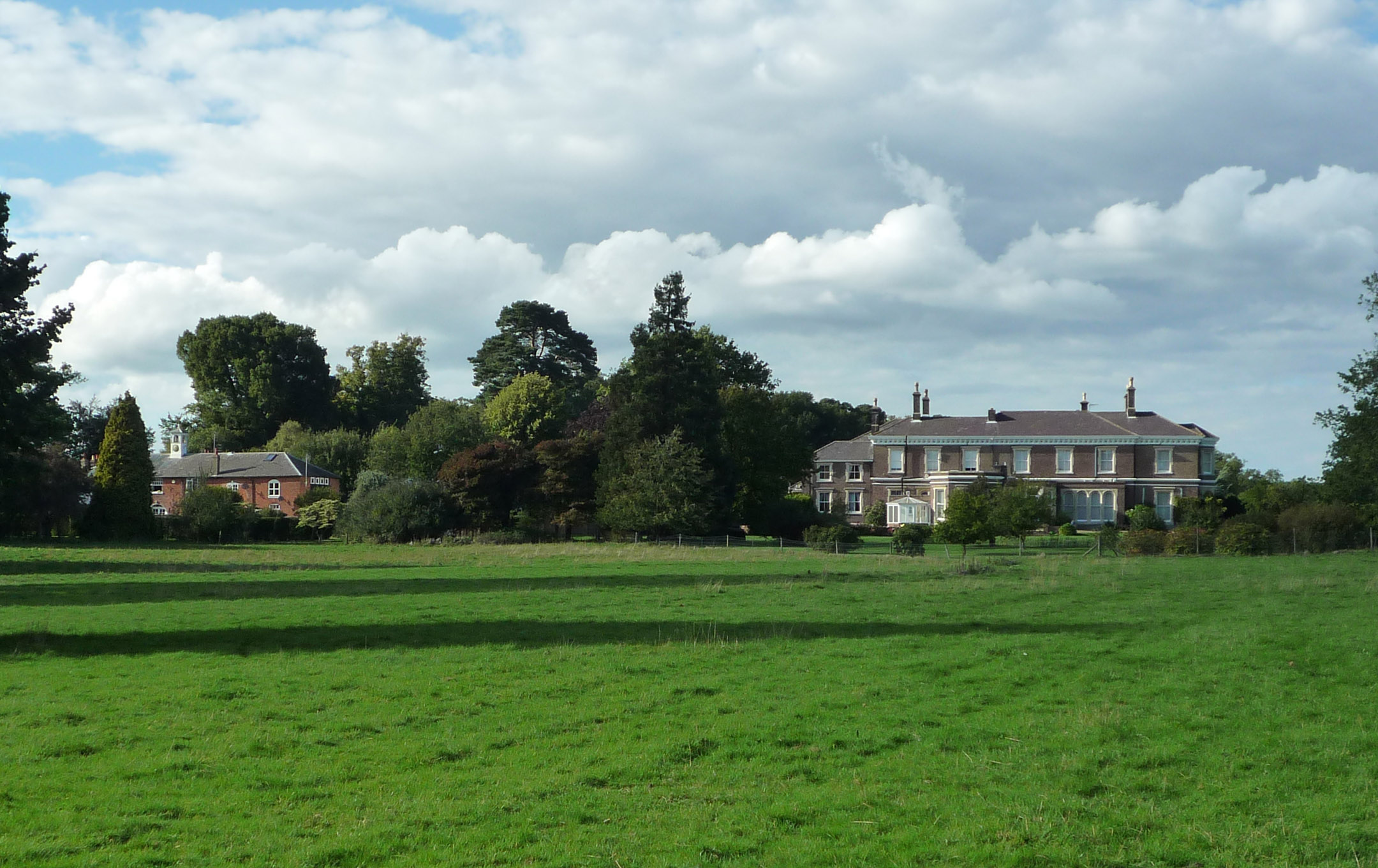
- Rossway House and Stable Block

- Location within Hertfordshire
- Former names: Rothway

General information
- Type: English country house
- Architectural style: Victorian Italianate
- Location: Hertfordshire, England, Northchurch, Berkhamsted, United Kingdom
- Coordinates: 51.75615°N 0.61095°W
- Completed: 1867
- Owner: Khoo Kay Peng

Technical details
- Floor count: 2
- Grounds: 1,000 acres (400 ha)

Design and construction
- Architect: Robert Evans
- Designations: Grade II listed building (main house)

Website
- rosswayparkestate.com

Rossway Park Estate is a 1,000-acre (400 ha) country estate located about 0.5 kilometers south of Berkhamsted in Hertfordshire, England. The house at the centre of the estate is a Grade II listed building.

== History ==
The Rossway Park estate, which dates from the 17th century and was then known as Rothway, was bought by Robert Sutton from Highgate in 1802. Charles Stanton Hadden, a coffee planter operating in Ceylon, acquired the estate in 1863, demolished the original mansion and built a new house which was completed in 1867. In 1903 the property passed to Major-General Charles Hadden, a British Army officer who became Master-General of the Ordnance. It then passed to the general's son, Major Adrian Hadden Paton, in 1949 and remained in the hands of the Hadden Paton family until 1998 when it was acquired by Khoo Kay Peng, chairman of MUI Group, which owned a majority stake in the retail chain Laura Ashley.

== House and estate buildings ==
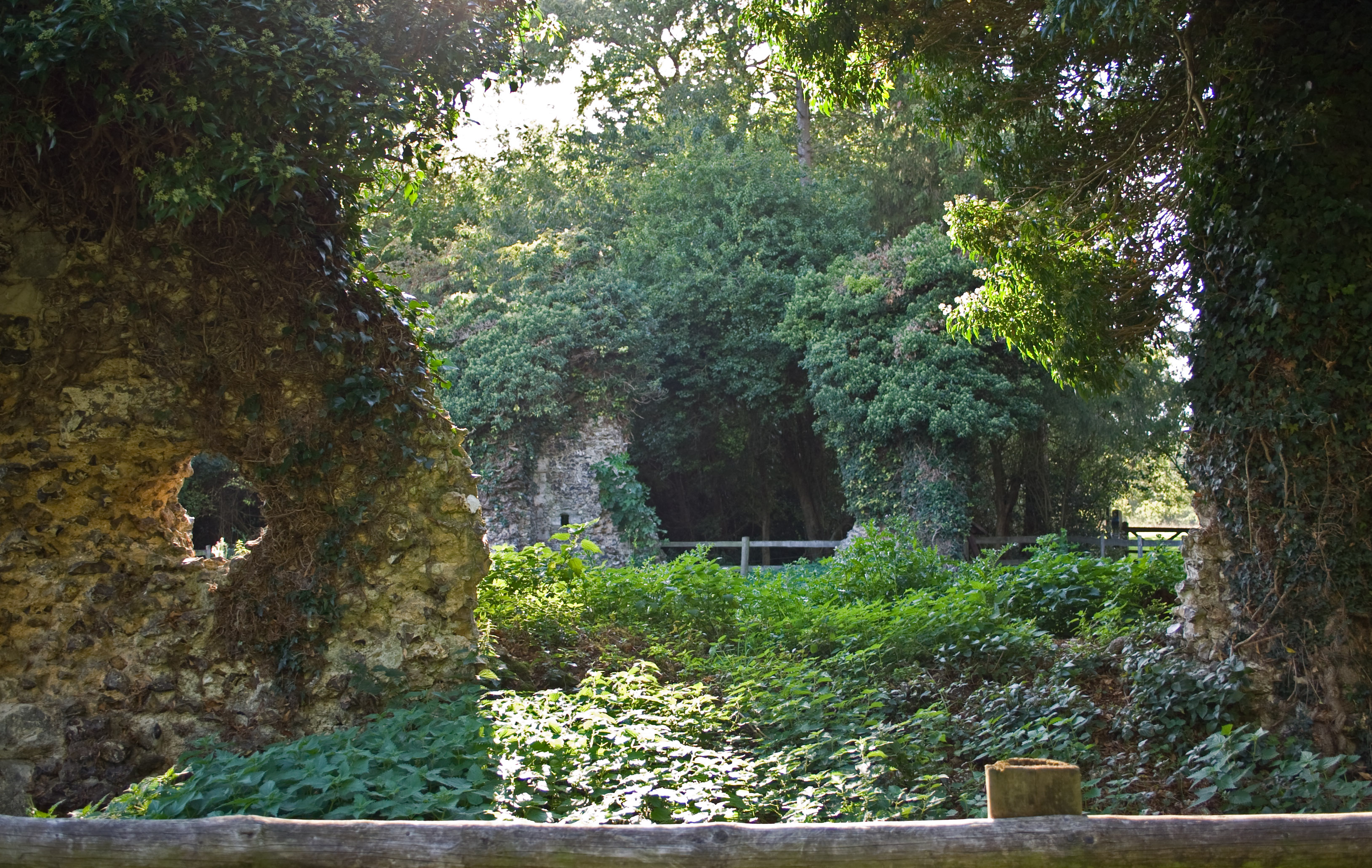
Marlin Chapel ruins

At the centre of the estate is Rossway, a large, Grade II-listed English country house. The present building dates from 1867 and was designed by the English architect Robert Evans in the Palladian style. The frontage features a central stone portico supported by columns with foliated capitals. The interior is richly decorated with large marble columns in the entrance hall, several marble fireplaces and foliated cornicing in the main rooms. A number of wooden fireplaces have been retained from the earlier 17th-century house. A number of ancillary buildings are also listed for their historic significance, such as the 16th-century farmhouse and 18th-century stable block.

Marlin Chapel Farm, also on the estate, has been listed as a scheduled monument; beneath the farm buildings, a double-moated site has been identified, possibly 13th century in origin, indicating the former presence of a prestigious aristocratic manor house. It is thought that the provision of a moat served as a status symbol rather than as a military defence. The farm is named after a 13th-century chapel building, Marlin Chapel, which once stood on the periphery of the moated site, Marlin being a corruption of Mary Magdalene, to whom the chapel is dedicated. The chapel ruins are now grade II listed.
