= Samuel Hambleton =

Samuel Hambleton may refer to:

- Samuel Hambleton (naval officer) (1777–1851), officer in the U.S. Navy who served during the War of 1812
- Samuel Hambleton (politician) (1812–1886), American politician
