= Eaton Bray =

Village in Bedfordshire, England

Coordinates: 51.8767°N 0.5954°W

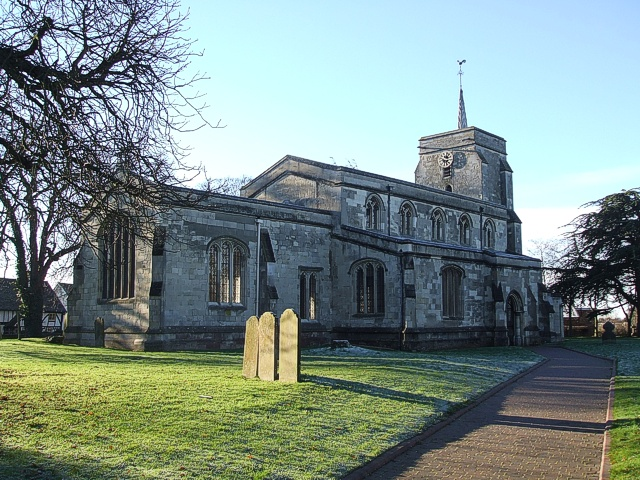
- St Mary the Virgin parish church

- Location within Bedfordshire
- Population: 2,644
- OS grid reference: SP967207
- Unitary authority: Central Bedfordshire
- Ceremonial county: Bedfordshire
- Region: East
- Country: England
- Sovereign state: United Kingdom
- Post town: Dunstable
- Postcode district: LU6
- Dialling code: 01525
- Police: Bedfordshire
- Fire: Bedfordshire
- Ambulance: East of England
- UK Parliament: Luton South and South Bedfordshire
- Website: Eaton Bray

Eaton Bray is a village and civil parish in Bedfordshire, England. It is situated about three miles south-west of the town of Dunstable and is part of a village which extends into the parish of Edlesborough. In the 2021 United Kingdom census the population of the parish was recorded as 2,644.

== Toponym ==
The toponym Eaton is common in England, being derived from the Old English eitone, meaning "farm by a river".

== Descent of the manor ==
The Domesday Book of 1086 lists the manor as Eitone, one of the numerous holdings throughout England of Odo, Bishop of Bayeux and Earl of Kent, uterine brother of King William the Conqueror. It later escheated to the crown. In 1205 the manor of Eaton (with many others) was granted to William I de Cantilupe (d.1239), steward of the household to King John (1199–1216), whereupon it became the caput of the feudal barony of Eaton. The grant was for knight-service of one knight and was in exchange for the manor of Coxwell in Berkshire, which had been granted to him previously. In 1221 Cantilupe built a castle at Eaton, which is stated in the Annals of Dunstable (written by chroniclers at nearby Dunstable Priory), as "a serious danger to Dunstable and the neighbourhood". The site of the castle, of which the square moat survives, is located approximately 800m to the west of the village and was listed as a scheduled monument in 1958. The 1274 inquisition post mortem of Sir George de Cantilupe (1252–1273), Lord of Abergavenny, the builder's great-grandson and the last in the male line, records many details concerning the arrangement of Eaton Castle: it was enclosed with a wall and a moat with two drawbridges; The hall had two chambers, a pantry and a buttery, with tiled roof; within the inner bailey were a great chamber, a foreign chamber, a garderobe, a house for a larder used for a kitchen because there was no kitchen; a drawbridge opened onto the deer park containing woodland of 28 acres; a new chapel and a granary. The outer bailey contained stables for sixty horses, with tiled roofs; a grange, cow houses, pigsties and other thatched buildings; beyond the walls were two gardens, one of three roods the other of one acre. In its final state the deer park covered about 100 acres (40 hectares), enclosed by a banks and ditches, small sections of which survive. Three sides of the square moat survive at Park Farm, open to the public for fishing. The suffix "Bray" was added following the acquisition of the manor by Sir Reginald Bray (d. 1503), in order to distinguish it from numerous other settlements of that name, as was common. The Bray family rebuilt a manor house on the site in the Tudor style. The next owner was the Huxley family. On the death of Sir John Huxley in 1675, the manor house was described as "empty and in a considerable state of disrepair". A deed dated about 1692 mentions "a manor, now known as 'Eaton Park House', surrounded by barns, stables and other outbuildings including a 'stone dovehouse' and a malthouse". The house is depicted within the moat on Jeffrey's 1765 map of Bedfordshire, but was demolished in 1794. The tithe map of 1849 shows the moated enclosure as pasture called "Park Gardens", and all standing remains on the site had been razed.

In the 19th century Arthur Macnamara (1831–1906) of Billington, known as "the Mad Squire", planned to build a mansion on the site of the castle, but ran out of money after completing the lodge at the entrance to Park Farm.

== Church of St Mary the Virgin, Eaton Bray with Edlesborough ==
The parish church was built soon after 1205 by William I de Cantilupe using stone from nearby Totternhoe. The organ was refurbished after a local fundraising campaign in the 1980s. The arcades of the nave and the font date from the Early English period. There is a 16th-century communion table.

== Governance ==
Eaton Bray is governed by Eaton Bray Parish Council (since 1894) and Central Bedfordshire Council (since 2009). Between 1894 and 1933 the parish formed part of Eaton Bray Rural District. Despite the name the council met in the nearby town of Leighton Buzzard. Eaton Bray Rural District was abolished to become part of Luton Rural District in 1933, which in turn became part of South Bedfordshire in 1974.

== Wallace Nurseries ==
Today the site of the former Wallace Nurseries is a housing estate many of the streets within which are named after varieties of plants created by the nursery, for example Saffron Rise and Coral Close.

William Osborne (born 1960), screenwriter

- Christopher Stearn (born 1980), cricketer

Jacqui and Steve Hargreaves (born 1960 and 1958), producers of 11,000 visors during the 2020 COVID-19 pandemic.
