= Bernard Ashley =

Bernard Ashley may refer to:

- Bernard Ashley (businessman) (1926–2009), British businessman and engineer, husband of Laura Ashley
- Bernard Ashley (author) (born 1935), British author of children's books
