= Khoo Kay Peng =

Malaysian Chinese businessman (born 1939)

Yang Berbahagia Tan Sri Khoo Kay Peng
- 邱繼炳
- Born: December 1939 (age 85); Batu Pahat, Johor, British Malaya (now Malaysia)
- Occupation: Businessman
- Title: Chairman, Laura Ashley plc
- Spouse: Pauline Chai (1970–2013; divorced)
- Children: 5

Chinese name
- Traditional Chinese: 邱繼炳
- Simplified Chinese: 邱继炳
- Hanyu Pinyin: Qiū Jìbǐng
- Hokkien POJ: Khu Kè-péng

Tan Sri Khoo Kay Peng (Chinese: 邱繼炳; born December 1939) is a Malaysian Chinese businessman. He is the chairman and a major shareholder of Laura Ashley plc, and the owner of MUI Group.

== Early life ==
Khoo Kay Peng was born in December 1939 in Batu Pahat, Johor.

== Career ==
Khoo was mentored by Khoo Teck Puat, who founded Malayan Banking (now Maybank) in 1960. Khoo joined the new bank and soon became a manager. In 1965, he was seconded to Bank Bumiputra, and quickly rose to a senior position. In his ten years there, he built relationships with Tengku Razaleigh Hamzah, Robert Kuok and Tan Koon Swan.

He left in 1976 to start his own business, developing property in Kuala Lumpur with a loan from Southern Banking, which made him a millionaire. In the same year, he bought a major stake in MUI Group, then a manufacturer of toothbrushes and household utensils, and used it as a vehicle for a series of corporate takeovers, growing MUI to a $91 million pre-tax profit in 1984.

Khoo operated for some time from 1980 from Australia, initially in Perth and later in Melbourne, but moved to the UK in the 1990s.

He is the owner of MUI Group, a conglomerate which includes "retail, hotel, food and financial-services interests in Asia, Australia, the U.S. and the U.K." according to Forbes. He also owned 44% of Laura Ashley plc and serves as its chairman. He is a director of Corus Hotels.

He is the 44th richest person in Malaysia, with an estimated wealth of US$300 million according to Forbes. However, the Financial Times suggested he was worth an estimated £400 million in February 2014.

In December 2018, Khoo retired from his role as the executive chairman at MUI, and was succeeded by his son, Andrew.

== Personal life ==
Khoo is a born-again Christian. He married former model and beauty queen, Pauline Chai Siew Phin, who hails from Ipoh, Perak in December 1970 when Chai was 24 and he was 31, shortly after she won the Miss Malaysia beauty pageant. They have five children—Alfred, Andrew, Angelina, Angeline and Alex. None of his children holds Malaysian citizenship or worked in Malaysia as all of them holds other countries' citizenship and resides in different locations in Singapore, Canada, England and Argentina. His eldest children, Alfred born with Tourette's syndrome while his two other children, Angelina and Alex have autism and Asperger's syndrome respectively.

He and his wife began divorce proceedings in 2013 after 43 years of marriage, with Chai citing the reason for the divorcement was due to Khoo's unreasonable behaviour. Chai, represented by Ayesha Vardag, issued a petition for divorce in London. However, the petition was disputed and for two years the couple fought over jurisdiction. Mr Justice Bodey of the English High Court ultimately ruled in Chai's favour. In April 2017, Chai was awarded £64 million in divorce settlements, one of the largest recorded.

He resides in Kuala Lumpur, Malaysia, while his former wife resides at Rossway, an estate in Hertfordshire, England. Their ongoing divorce has led to the revelation of personal details. Chai, who left Malaysia in 1980 to live in Australia, later in Canada before moved to England, renounced her Malaysian citizenship in 2009, claiming that she has "only one friend in Malaysia" and has "no interest" in her home country. Khoo later said that his marriage with Chai was a big mistake to him. He said: "Her (Chai's) behaviour and demeanour had changed. Now, I know who the real person (Chai) is, after 43 years of marriage".

Khoo's daughter, Angeline married Jedidiah Francis, a Caribbean-born data scientist of Indian descent. Due to cultural differences, he refused to give his blessings to them to get married, resulting Khoo and his daughter ended their relationship and no longer talking to each other. Khoo insisted that he would not accept Francis as his son-in-law.

== Honours ==
- Malaysia :
  - Commander of the Order of Loyalty to the Crown of Malaysia (P.S.M.) - Tan Sri (1986)
