= Mynydd Fforest =

Hill (400m) in Powys, Wales

Coordinates: 52.0468°N 3.3211°W

Mynydd Fforest (Forested Mountain) is a hill about two miles northwest of Llyswen in the county of Powys in Wales. It rises to 399.8 m (1,312 ft)) from the lower slopes of the Epynt, and has a prominence of 63 m (207 ft), so is classed as a Tump.

== Etymology and forestation ==
As the name suggests, the hill was covered in trees at one point but like many hills across the country, deforestation took place. Conifer plantations which border Mynydd Fforest have allowed a few European larches, and Sitka spruce to take root.

Apart from large areas of moorland, small areas of Mynydd Fforest have been re-taken by native trees, such as mountain ash, sessile oak, holly, hazel, hawthorn, blackthorn, and ash.

There are numerous springs and marshes which are home to newts, frogs, and toads. Many species of bird nest in the bracken also, the skylark especially. Buzzards and red kites have been spotted circling the hill on many occasions.

Due to the springs and tributaries crossing the paths at different points, there are a few fords along the way.

Unfortunately, due to the construction of the controversial Gas Pipeline from Milford Haven to Gloucester, the path to Brechfa Pool has been cut off and must be crossed by going through gates. Before the construction of the pipeline, one could walk over a very wide area, keeping erosion quite low, but as there is now fence surrounding the pipeline, gates have been set up to allow access to other areas beyond Mynydd Fforest, although there are few gates, so, while in the past people and vehicles were spread over a wide area, they have been funneled into few gates, increasing erosion and habitat loss. Illegal mountain biking has also caused disturbance to skylarks nesting in the bracken.

There is still sheep grazing on Mynydd Fforest and there are often ponies to be seen roaming around as well, although these are not wild. The bracken is cut down during August–November to be used as bedding for livestock during the winter.
