= Arthur Macnamara =

Arthur Macnamara (1831 – 11 February 1906) was a squire of Billington near Leighton Buzzard in Bedfordshire, England. He is known for building in and improving the village of Billington.

== Early life ==
Macnamara came from a wealthy family who owned many properties. They included in England, Caddington Hall in Hertfordshire and an estate at Eaton Bray in Bedfordshire, and in Wales, Llangoed Estate, the seat of which was Llangoed Hall at Llyswen in the historic county of Brecknockshire.

== Marriage ==
On 28 September 1854, Macnamara married Lady Sophia Hare, daughter of the local MP for St Albans the 2nd, Earl of Listowel. The couple were married in the bride's family estate at Ballyhooly in County Cork, Ireland. The couple then established their home at Caddington Hall.

At that time, young Macnamara developed a passion for building. He embarked on the project of re-creating the lost castle of Eaton Bray on some land bequeathed to him by his mother. After building grandiose lodges and clearing and preparing the moated site, he seemed to abandon the idea, probably due to lack of funds. All was not well in his marriage, either. Sophia's father, a Lord-in-Waiting to Queen Victoria, was able to secure his daughter a position as a Lady-in-Waiting to the Queen's daughter, Princess Louise, Duchess of Argyll.

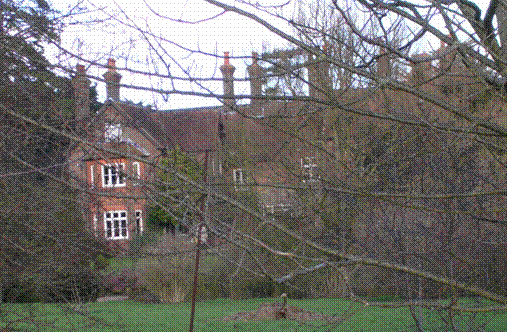
The Manor House was built by Arthur Macnamara at Billington, one of the Irish McNamaras of the Ennistymon House branch from County Clare. This book has been republished in a limited edition by Martin Breen. See http://www.martinbreen.com/ for more details.

== Construction ==
In the early 1880s, Macnamara began to acquire land and cottages at Billington and embarked on an ambitious building project, perhaps inspired by the building of Mentmore by Baron Mayer de Rothschild, which was only five miles away.

At first, he built farm houses in the village, adorning each with the Macnamara cypher 'AM'. As Billington became the estate village, Macnamara began to build a manor house, which was a large, multi-gabled Victorian mansion. The grounds had stable yards, lodges, and farm houses. At Little Billington, a mile away, a lodge was built for a new principal approach to the house, but as money became exhausted, the drive was never built.

A row of cottages existed within sight of the new drive, although as the landlord, Macnamara turned out the elderly occupants and placed them in the workhouse.

== Reputation ==
Macnamara had a reputation for severity, and was regarded as someone who was cruel to the common people of the village. It was said that when he encountered any of his tenants driving sheep or cattle along the road, he ordered his coachman not to stop or slow down. If people did not hurry out of his path, they were mowed down. As chairman of the police and the largest land owner in the district, he thought he was above the law. The slightest affront imagined by the squire could lead to the eviction of the perpetrators from their homes.

However, Squire Macnamara had one huge fear: he was frightened of thunder. An underground suite of rooms was furnished at Billington Manor, where he would retreat for long periods of time at the slightest threat of thunder.

== Death ==
On 11 February 1906, Arthur Macnamara died in the great house, alone except for his housekeeper. The cause of his death was cirrhosis of the liver.

After his death, he was found to be bankrupt. Lady Sophia sold the estate in her old age. She then lived at Heath and Reach, Leighton Buzzard, where members of the royal family visited her.

Arthur Macnamara was buried in the Billington churchyard, with a monumental tombstone surrounded by iron railings. There is a legend that it was a tradition for the spikes on top of the railings to curve outwards to keep the devil out, but on Arthur Macnamara's grave, the spikes were turned in to prevent him from escaping. (The railings were removed during World War II when iron work was melted down to help the war effort.)

Lady Sophia McNamara died in 1912. She chose to be buried in Ireland.
