= Llangoed Hall =

Country house hotel in Powys, Wales

Coordinates: 52.0517°N 3.2847°W

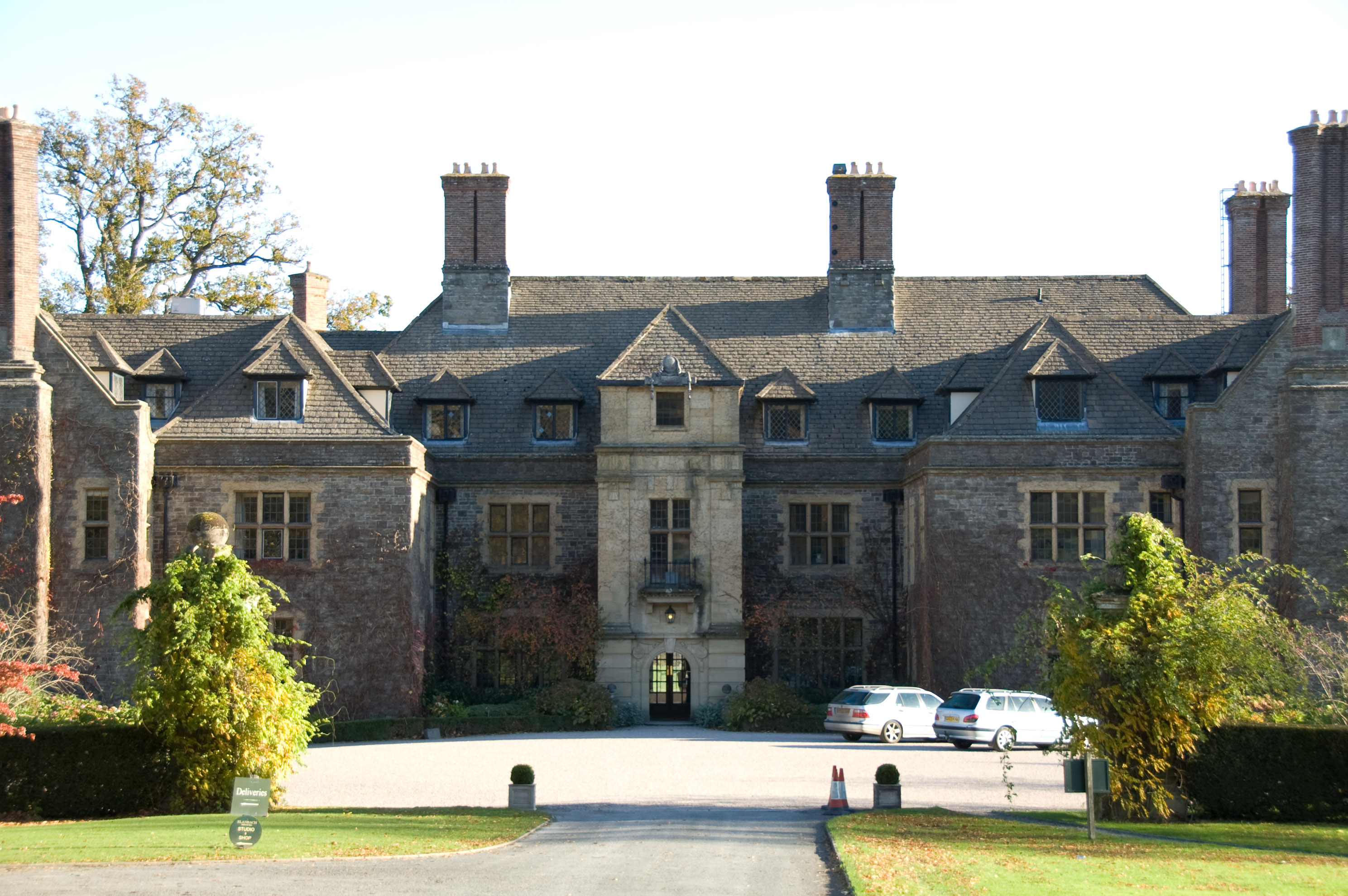
Llangoed Hall in 2007

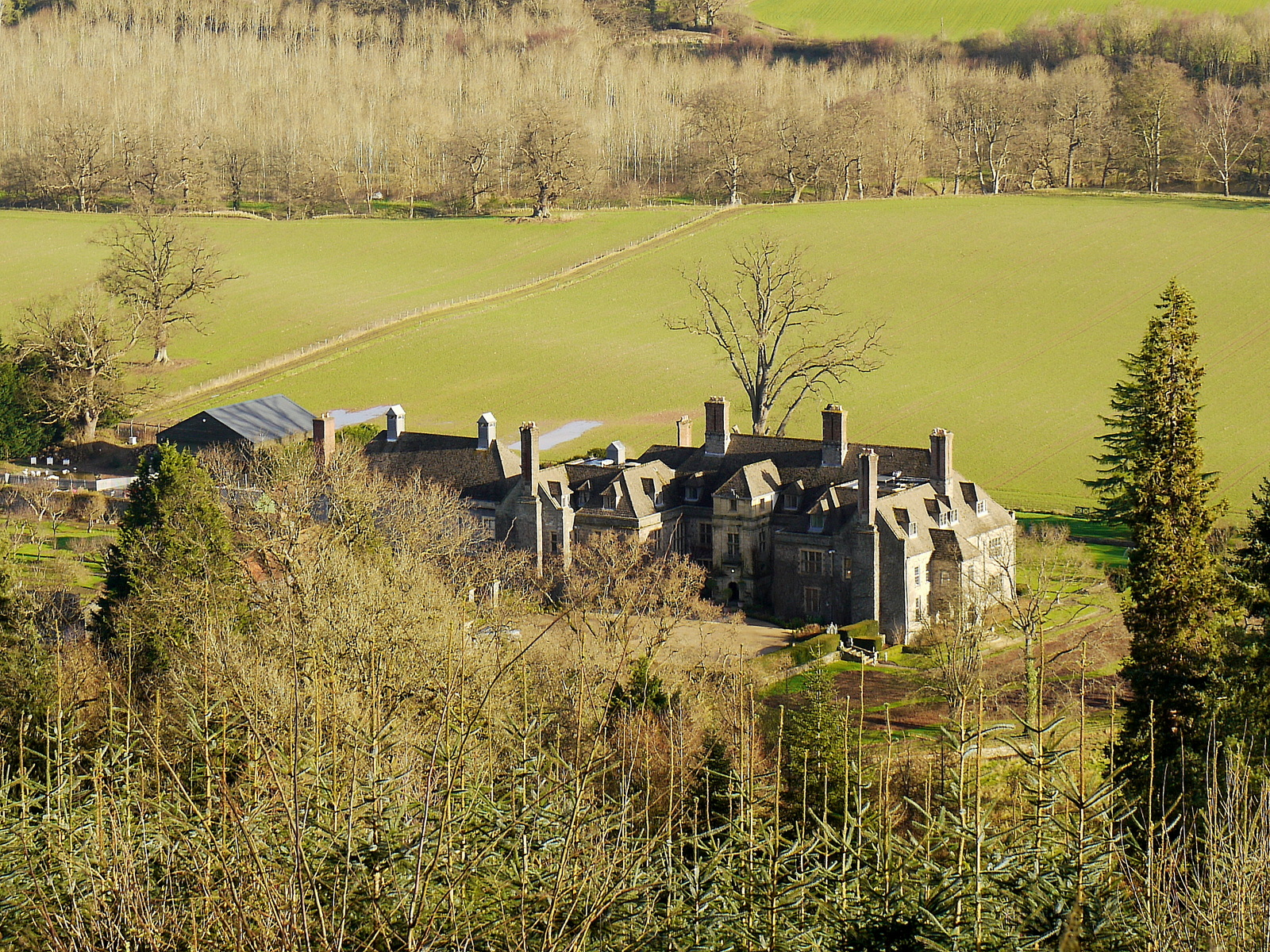
Llangoed Hall - aerial view

Llangoed Hall is a country house hotel, near the village of Llyswen, in Powys, Mid Wales. It is known for its decoration in Laura Ashley fabrics and styles, and was owned by Sir Bernard Ashley, the widower of the designer. It is a Grade II* listed building, and its gardens and park are listed at Grade II on the Cadw/ICOMOS Register of Parks and Gardens of Special Historic Interest in Wales.

== History ==
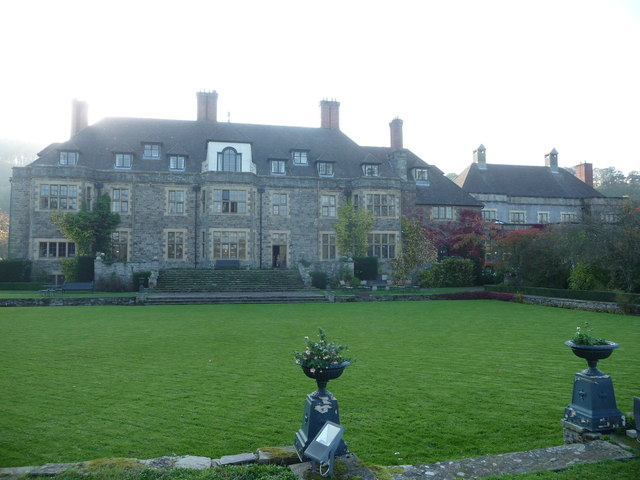
Part of Llangoed Hall Hotel

The Hall, originally known as Llangoed Castle, was donated to the church in 560 by Prince Iddon in expiation of his sins. It might have been the site of the reputed White Palace, which was the home of the first Welsh parliament. A mansion existed from 1632.

It was in the possession of the Macnamara family for two generations until 1847, but changed hands to settle a gambling debt. After the First World War, Clough Williams-Ellis re-designed it as a country house, retaining the surviving Jacobean porch, as part of the south wing but creating several Arts and Crafts additions.

Sir Bernard Ashley bought Llangoed Hall in 1987 and opened it as a hotel in 1990. The Ashley family sold the hall to Von Essen Hotels in November 2010 for an undisclosed sum. The property was put up for sale again in February 2012 after Von Essen went into administration in April 2011.

== Hotel ==
Sir Bernard Ashley's intention was to recreate Llangoed Hall as an Edwardian house, replete with high-society Edwardian customs, period furnishings and antique fittings. The hotel also has an art collection with pieces by Whistler, Augustus John, Walter Sickert, Andrew Melville, John Duncan Fergusson and Albert Lynch.

Bedrooms are individually designed and decorated with furnishings from Laura Ashley and Sir Bernard's venture company Elanbach, which he created in 2000 and is based in the hotel's grounds. It won the Best Restaurant in Wales award in its first year.
