= Ayesha Vardag =

English solicitor and divorce lawyer

- Born: Ayesha Mary Barbara Vardag; March 1968 (age 58); London, England
- Education: University of Cambridge (BA); Université libre de Bruxelles (LLM)
- Occupation: Solicitor
- Employer: Vardags Ltd
- Spouse: Stephen Bence
- Children: 5
- Website: vardags.com

Ayesha Mary Barbara Vardag (born March 1968) is an English solicitor and divorce lawyer.

== Early life ==
Vardag was raised by her mother Barbara in Oxfordshire, England, and studied Law at Queens' College, Cambridge with Duke of Edinburgh award for membership of the Inner Temple. She took a Masters as a Cambridge Wiener Anspach scholar in European Law at the Université libre de Bruxelles, where she worked on research projects at the International Court of Justice in The Hague and at the UN (IAEA) Legal Division in Vienna.

== Legal career ==
Vardag qualified as a solicitor in 1996 and was initially trained at Linklaters. She taught Family Law at Queen Mary University of London

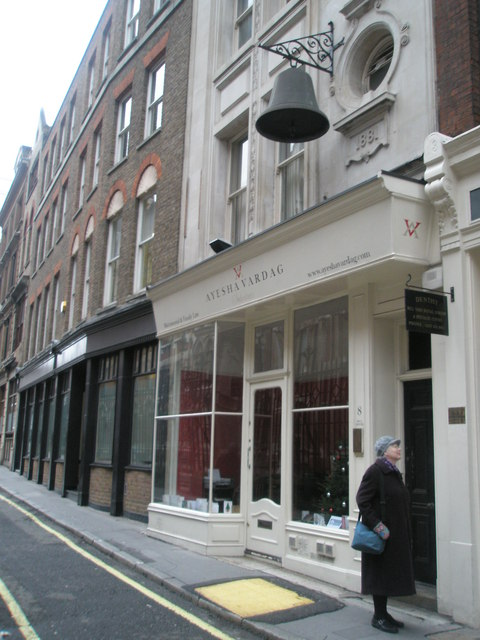
Ayesha Vardag's Offices in Bell Yard, December 2009

Prior to becoming a family lawyer, she worked for the New York law firm Weil, Gotshal & Manges. Vardags training in matrimonial law was as one of two assistants to Raymond Tooth, senior partner at London law firm, Sears Tooth, and co-founder of the International Academy of Matrimonial Lawyers, an invitation-only organisation which now consists of over 500 of the world's leading family lawyers. Vardag founded Ayesha Vardag solicitors in 2005, which incorporated as Vardags in May 2010.

=== Notable cases ===
In 2010, Vardag represented German heiress Katrin Radmacher in the Radmacher v Granatino case which allowed a prenuptial agreement for the first time in the UK. She and her team won a ruling holding that the prenup drawn up to protect Radmacher's £100 million fortune from her French-born husband Nicolas Granatino, was legally binding. While the case established for the first time that prenups are enforceable in the UK, courts still retain the discretionary right to veto them if they are found to be unfair. She acted for Radmacher throughout the hearings in the High Court, Court of Appeal and Supreme Court. Her firm, then named Ayesha Vardag Solicitors, is noted as the instructing solicitors on all three judgments.

In 2017, in a four-year-long divorce case complicated by a dispute over whether jurisdiction lay in the UK or Malaysia, Vardag represented London-based Malaysian former beauty queen, Pauline Chai, whose husband, Malaysian tycoon and non-executive chair of Laura Ashley Holdings, Khoo Kay Peng, wanted the case heard in their original homeland. The Vardags jurisdiction argument was decided in favour of her client. Chai was awarded a settlement of £64 million.

== Personal life ==
Vardag is married to Stephen Bence, a financial consultant who is chief executive officer of Vardags. As of April 2016, the couple has five children. A previous marriage ended in divorce. She appeared with Bence in Season 1 Episode 1 of Couples Come Dine With Me and finished last.

== See also ==
- Family law
