= Inn at Perry Cabin =

Hotel in Saint Michaels, Maryland, United States

Coordinates: 38°47′25″N 76°13′18″W

Inn At Perry Cabin
- Interactive map of the Inn At Perry Cabin area

General information
- Location: Saint Michaels, Maryland United States
- Opening: 1999

Other information
- Number of rooms: 79
- Number of suites: 38
- Number of restaurants: 1

Inn at Perry Cabin is a hotel in St. Michaels, Maryland, USA. The building dates back to the colonial era and the site was one of the original land grants from the English Crown to the New World.

The original Inn, built in 1816, (now the north wing of the manor house) was designed and built by Purser Samuel Hambleton, a War of 1812 Navy veteran and aide-de-camp to Commodore Oliver Hazard Perry. The Inn was built to resemble the Commodore’s cabin (‘Perry Cabin’) on the flagship USS Niagara.

The property changed over time from a private home to a working farm, and then again to a riding academy.

In 1980 Harry Meyerhoff of St. Michaels, along with sons Tom and Jack, converted it into a six-room hotel with a small restaurant. In September 1989, Sir Bernard Ashley purchased the property and began a two-year expansion that transformed The Inn at Perry Cabin into a 41-room luxury hotel.

Orient-Express Hotels acquired the property in May 1999. By 2003, the company completed a $17 million improvement program designed by the architecture firm of Cooper, Robertson & Partners, which included three new buildings and 38 guest suites to bring the total room count from its original 41 up to 79. In March 2014 Orient-Express Hotels changed its name to Belmond, and the hotel was renamed Inn at Perry Cabin by Belmond. The Inn at Perry Cabin was also inducted into Historic Hotels of America, the official program for Historic Preservation, in 2018. It is no longer listed as of 2026.

== Popular culture ==
The Inn at Perry Cabin was the site of the main wedding reception in the film Wedding Crashers, starring Owen Wilson and Vince Vaughn
