= USS Hambleton =

Gleaves-class destroyer

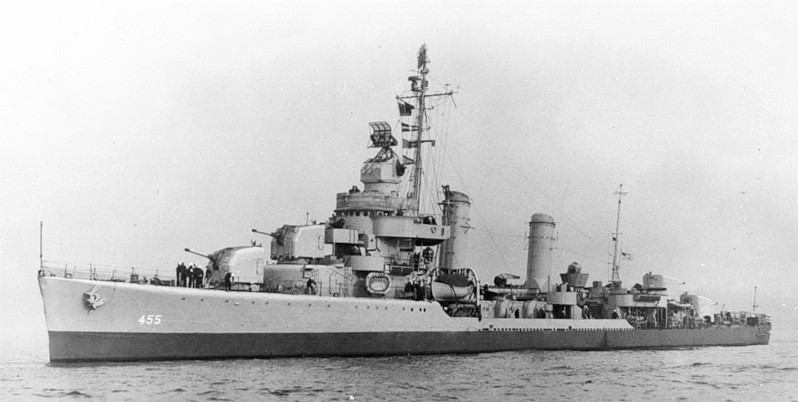
- USS Hambleton (DD-455) underway in February 1944

History

United States
- Name: Hambleton
- Namesake: Samuel Hambleton
- Builder: Federal Shipbuilding & Drydock Co.
- Laid down: 16 December 1940
- Launched: 26 September 1941
- Commissioned: 22 December 1941
- Identification: DD-455
- Reclassified: DMS-20, 15 November 1944
- Decommissioned: 15 January 1955
- Stricken: 1 June 1971
- Fate: Sold for scrap, 22 November 1972

General characteristics
- Class & type: Gleaves-class destroyer
- Displacement: 2,200 tons
- Length: 347 ft 11 in (106.05 m)
- Beam: 36 ft 1 in (11.00 m)
- Draft: 15 ft 8 in (4.78 m)
- Propulsion: 50,000 shp (37,000 kW); 2 propellers
- Speed: 35 kn (65 km/h; 40 mph)
- Range: 6,500 nmi (12,000 km; 7,500 mi) at 12 kn (22 km/h; 14 mph)
- Complement: 272
- Armament: 4 × 5 in (127 mm) dual purpose guns, 4 × Bofors 40 mm guns, 5 × Oerlikon 20 mm cannons, 5 × 21 in (533 mm) torpedo tubes, 6 × depth charge projectors, 2 × depth charge tracks

USS Hambleton (DD-455/DMS-20) was a Gleaves-class destroyer of the United States Navy, named for Purser Samuel Hambleton (1777–1851).

Hambleton was laid down by the Federal Shipbuilding & Drydock Co., Kearny, New Jersey, on 16 December 1940 and launched on 26 September 1941, sponsored by Mrs. Nannie Hambleton Martin, great-grandniece of Samuel Hambleton. The destroyer was commissioned on 22 December 1941.

== Service history ==
=== 1942-1943 ===
Departing Norfolk on 31 January 1942, in company with Emmons, Hambleton began a shakedown, unique in wartime, that took her through the Panama Canal to Callao, Peru; Valparaíso, Chile; Guayaquil, Ecuador; Cartagena, Colombia; and Balboa, Panama Canal Zone She was diverted for antisubmarine search north of Cuba in early March, and on 15 March 1942 rescued six men on a life raft who had survived the torpedoing of Ceibra. After antisubmarine patrol along the East Coast and intensive training in Casco Bay, Maine, Hambleton sailed as escort to the cruiser Augusta and aircraft carrier Ranger on 14 April. Reaching Africa's Gold Coast on 10 May, Ranger launched her cargo of Curtiss P-40s for the North African fighting and headed back to the West Indies. In heavy rain and low visibility on 17 May, Hambleton collided with Ellyson and had to proceed to San Juan and then Charleston Navy Yard for repairs.

Hambleton joined a fast troop transport out of New York on 1 July, sailed for Ireland and arrived on 11 July. Immediately she reported for duty with the Joint British and American Naval Forces In Europe. With Royal Navy personnel on board as communications liaison, she conducted antisubmarine patrols and served as plane guard for the battleship Duke of York through August. She then returned to the United States for duty along the coast in preparation for Operation Torch, the forthcoming invasion of North Africa.

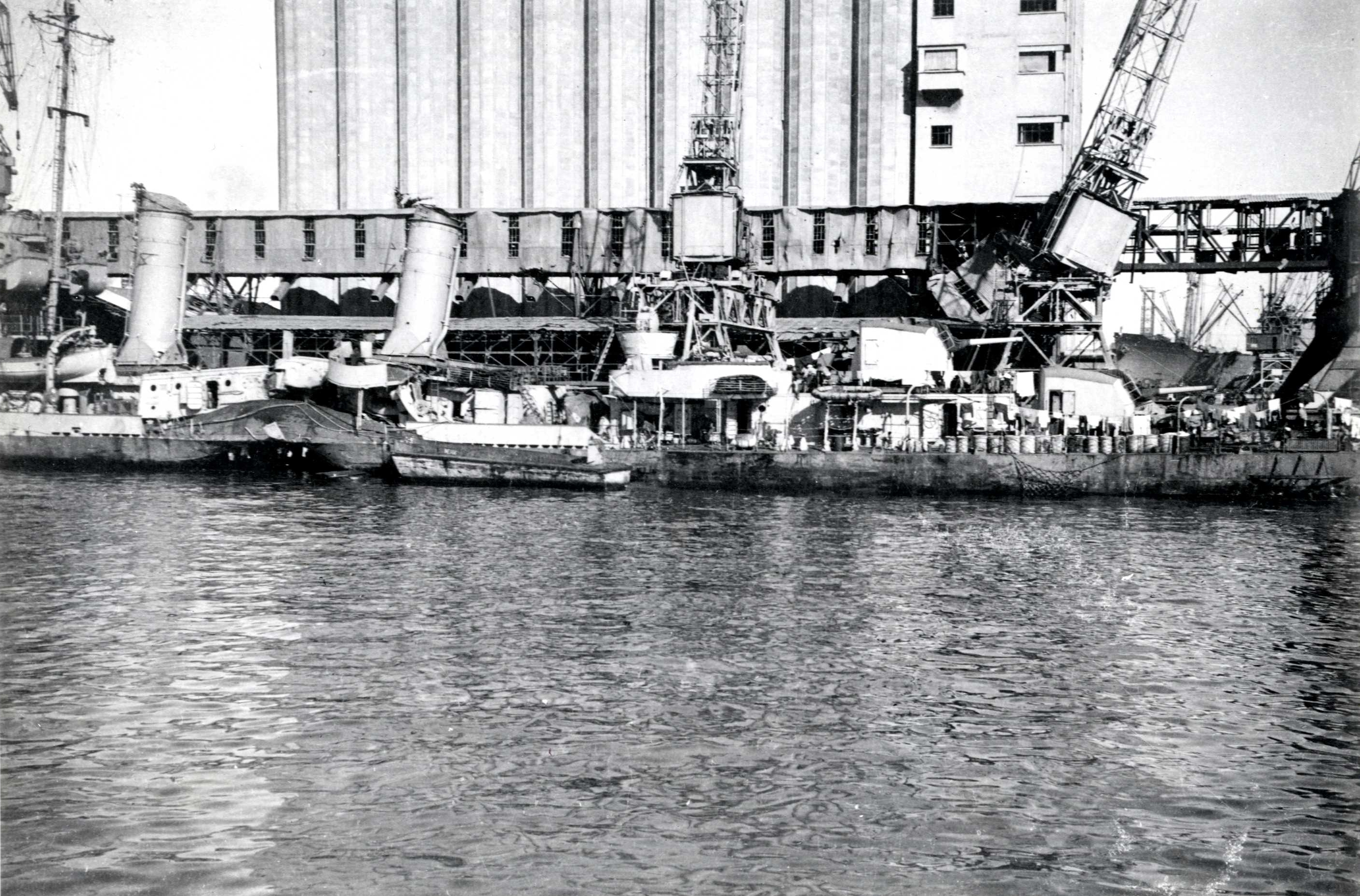
Hambleton after being torpedoed in November 1942.

Hambleton joined the invasion fleet on 28 October, and as part of Admiral H. Kent Hewitt's Western Naval Task Force, she screened the escort carrier Sangamon during operations against airfields in French Morocco on D-Day, 8 November. As she lay anchored by Winooski off Fedala in the evening of 11 November 1942, Hambleton was struck amidships on the port side by a torpedo fired by the German submarine U-173. With all power gone, the destroyer took a 12 degree list to starboard as her damage control parties worked swiftly to jettison topside weights and shore up weakened bulkheads. The crippled ship was towed to Casablanca for temporary repairs in the floating dry dock sunk just the day before. Seabees cut the ship in two, removed a 40-foot (12 m) section of her damaged hull, then joined the two remaining halves together. Escorted by a tug, Hambleton reached Boston 28 June 1943 for permanent repairs.

=== 1944 ===
==== Normandy invasion ====
After a second shakedown in the Caribbean and training along the East Coast, Hambleton escorted a convoy to Oran in April 1944, and began to prepare for her role in the Normandy invasion. Operating in the Western Mediterranean with seven other destroyers and British scout planes, she sank the German submarine U-616 on 17 May after an intensive 4-day pursuit of the German marauder. From the Mediterranean Hambleton sailed to Plymouth, England, staging area for the epochal invasion. She escorted a large convoy of LSTs to the landing areas on 7 June, D-Day plus 1, and remained off Omaha Beach for critical shore bombardment and screening duties. In the early morning hours of 9 June, Hambleton's radar picked up several contacts, soon determined to be Nazi E-boats. Her guns blazing, Hambleton set out after the enemy. In a 4-hour running gun battle, she sank one and severely damaged another of the five German boats. After returning for provisions at Portland, England, Hambleton was back on the line for the Bombardment of Cherbourg 25 June.

Hambleton departed Belfast, Northern Ireland on 4 July, and steamed to the Mediterranean, touching Oran, Algeria, 10 July and reaching Naples, Italy, on 15 July. On 11 August, she participated in the bombardment of shore positions on the southern coast of France prior to Operation Anvil, the invasion of that vital area. Hambleton remained in the Mediterranean for patrol and screening duty until sailing to Boston on 25 October.

==== Conversion to Destroyer/Minesweeper ====
Arriving Boston on 8 November, the battle-training destroyer was converted into a high speed minesweeper and redesignated DMS-20 on 15 November.

=== 1945 ===
==== Okinawa ====
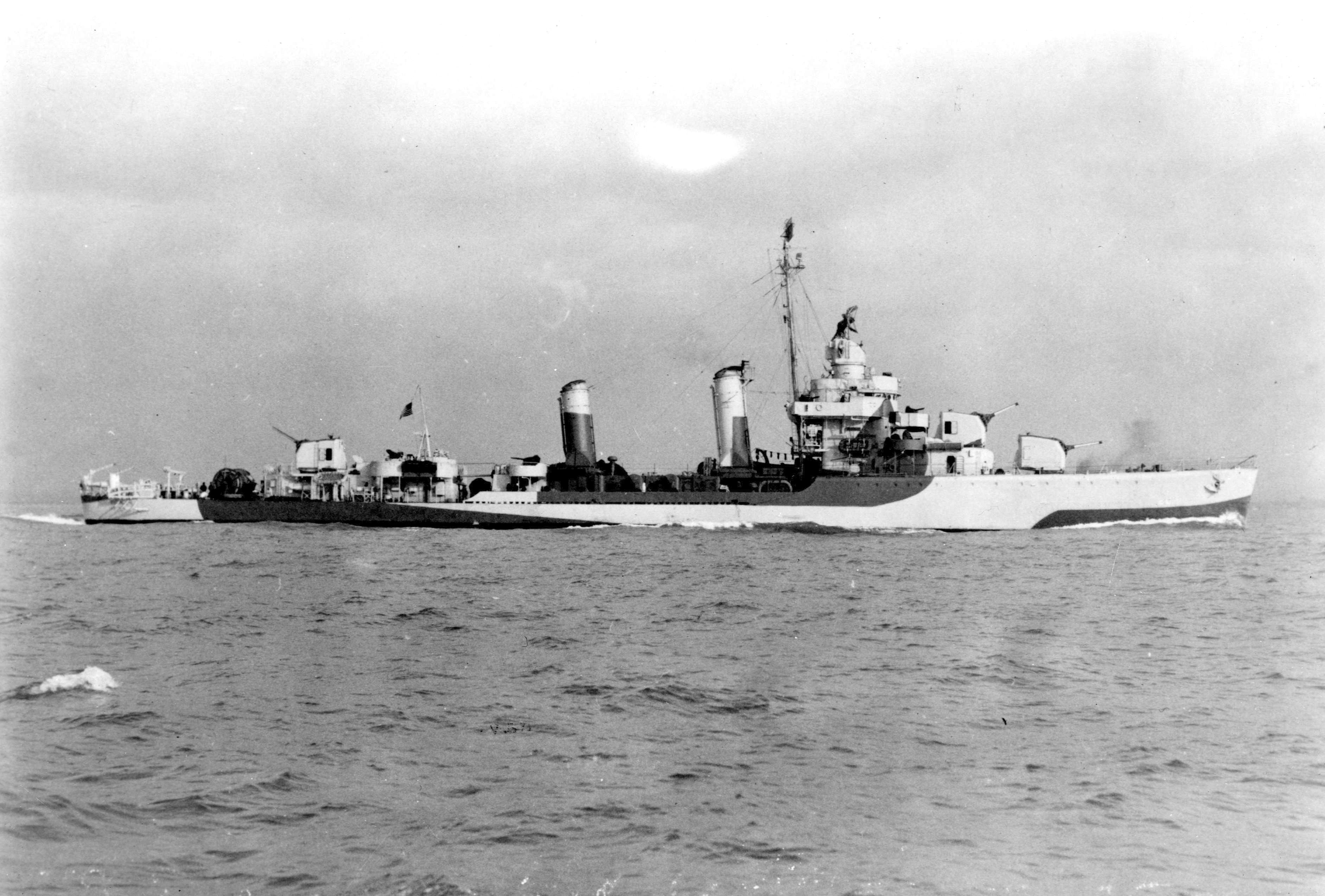
Hambleton after conversion to a high-speed minesweeper.

Hambleton emerged from the yard 13 December and sailed for the Pacific 30 December. Steaming via San Diego, Pearl Harbor, and Eniwetok, she arrived Ulithi 9 March 1945, to prepare for the invasion of Okinawa, the largest amphibious assault in the Pacific. Departing on 19 March, she arrived off Okinawa, the gateway to the heart of the Japanese Empire, 23 March. Prior to the invasion 1 April, she cleared channels and anchorages for the 1,200 ships taking part in the invasion. During the long campaign that followed, she operated off Okinawa to sweep, screen, patrol, and provide fire support. She was under almost constant attack from the air. Although damaged on 3 April by a kamikaze, which splashed close aboard her port quarter, Hambleton remained on duty as part of the fleet that had come to the Ryukyu Islands.

With Okinawa nearly secured, Hambleton and her sister ships deployed to the East China Sea in mid-July to begin massive sweeping of mines of this area. In a month they cleared more than 600 miles (970 km) from the 7,200-square-mile (19,000 km^{2}) area in one of the largest sweep operations yet launched. Hambleton was in the East China Sea for a second such mission when Japanese acceptance of peace terms was announced 15 August. Joining Admiral William F. Halsey's 3rd Fleet off Tokyo, Hambleton steamed into Tokyo Bay 28 August to clear the way for the occupation forces. In the next few months Hambleton swept a total of 184 mines from Japanese minefields in various straits and channels. During this period she rode out four typhoons, one of which battered her with 60-foot (18 m) waves. Departing Japanese waters 20 November, Hambleton steamed via Eniwetok, Pearl Harbor, and San Diego to Norfolk arriving late December.

=== 1946–1955 ===
Based at Charleston, South Carolina, the veteran minesweeper maintained an operational pattern that kept her prepared for the emerging Cold War struggle. During the next decade Hambleton participated in fleet and tactical exercises in the Caribbean and along the East Coast. In 1949, 1952, and 1954 she deployed to the Mediterranean and operated with the 6th Fleet from the shores of North Africa to the turbulent Middle East.

After returning to Charleston from her third Mediterranean cruise on 6 July 1954, Hambleton decommissioned on 15 January 1955, and entered the Atlantic Reserve Fleet. She was reclassified DD-455 the same day.

Hambleton was stricken from the Naval Vessel Register on 1 June 1971. She was sold 22 November 1972 and broken up for scrap.

== Awards ==
Hambleton received seven battle stars for World War II service.
