= MUI Group =

Malaysian holding company

Malayan United Industries Berhad
- Company type: Public limited company
- Traded as: MYX: 3891
- ISIN: MYL3891OO008
- Founded: 28 May 1960
- Headquarters: Malaysia
- Key people: Khoo Kay Peng, Chairman & CEO
- Subsidiaries: List of subsidiaries
- Website: www.muiglobal.com

Malayan United Industries Berhad (MUI; MYX: 3891) is a Malaysian holding company. It was founded in 1960, and owned by Khoo Kay Peng. The main businesses of the group includes retailing, hotels, food and confectionery, financial services, property, travel and tourism. The group has business presence in the UK, Continental Europe, the US, Canada, the UAE, Malaysia, Thailand, Australia, Hong Kong, China, Japan and Singapore.

Some of the major company names in MUI group includes Metrojaya Berhad, Laura Ashley plc, Corus Hotels and Network Foods. The company also purchased evangelist Jim Bakker's bankrupt Heritage USA Christian resort and theme park in Fort Mill, South Carolina, in 1991 and operated it for a number of years under its subsidiary, Regent Carolina Corporation, before selling the property in the mid-2000s. In recent years, MUI relocated Laura Ashley's United States corporate headquarters to a building at the former Heritage USA site that once served as Jim Bakker's PTL ministry headquarters.

== Subsidiaries ==
=== Retailing ===
- Metrojaya Berhad
- Laura Ashley Holdings plc

=== Financial services ===
- PM Securities Sdn Bhd

=== Hotels ===
- Corus Hotels UK
- Corus Hotels Kuala Lumpur
- Corus Paradise Resort Port Dickson

=== Properties ===
- MUI Properties

=== Food and confectionery ===
- Network Foods Group
- Network Foods Malaysia
