= Charles Hadden =

British Army general

Major-General Sir Charles Hadden KCB
- Born: 2 June 1854; Nottingham, Nottinghamshire, England
- Died: 13 September 1924 (aged 70); Rossway, Hertfordshire, England
- Military career
- Allegiance: United Kingdom
- Branch: British Army
- Rank: Major-General
- Awards: Knight Commander of the Order of the Bath

Sir Charles Frederick Hadden KCB (2 June 1854 – 13 September 1924) was a British Army officer who served as Master-General of the Ordnance.

== Early life and education ==
Hadden was born in Nottingham, the son of Charles Stanton Hadden, a Ceylon coffee planter. He was educated at Elstree School and Cheltenham College before attending the Royal Military Academy, Woolwich.

== Military career ==
Hadden was commissioned into the Royal Artillery in 1873. He was appointed Chief Inspector at the Royal Arsenal at Woolwich in 1893 and then became a Member of the Ordnance Committee and an Associate Member of Explosives Committee in 1901.

He was made Commandant of the Ordnance College and Director of Artillery in 1904 before moving on to be Master-General of the Ordnance in 1907. In that capacity he was a member of a special committee set up by Prime Minister H. H. Asquith to exploit aerial construction in 1909. He was promoted to major general in April 1910 and appointed president of an ordnance board and Royal Artillery committee in 1913.

== Personal life ==
In 1885, Hadden married Frances Mabel Strong, the daughter of Col. Clement Strong of the Coldstream Guard.

He lived at Rossway near Berkhamsted.

He died suddenly of heart failure, aged 70.

Military offices
Preceded by Sir James Wolfe Murray	Master-General of the Ordnance; 1907–1913	Succeeded by Sir Stanley von Donop
