= Christopher Stearn =

English cricketer

Personal information
- Full name: Christopher Paul Stearn
- Born: 11 July 1980 (age 46); Eaton Bray, Bedfordshire, England
- Batting: Right-handed
- Bowling: Right-arm medium-fast

Domestic team information
- Years: Team
- 2001–2005: Bedfordshire
- 2005–2006: Oxford University

Career statistics
Competition	First-class
Matches	2
Runs scored	71
Batting average	71.00
100s/50s	–/–
Top score	38
Catches/stumpings	1/–
- Source: Cricinfo, 25 July 2019

Christopher Paul Stearn (born 11 July 1980) is an English former first-class cricketer.

Stearn was born at Eaton Bray in July 1980. He was educated at Bedford School, before going up to Worcester College, Oxford. After graduating from Oxford, he undertook an MPhil in polar studies at St Edmund's College, Cambridge for a year, before three years of DPhil studies in weathering processes in desert environments back at Oxford. During his DPhil period at Oxford, he made his debut in first-class cricket for Oxford University against Cambridge University at Fenner's in 2005. He made a second first-class appearance for Oxford University in the same fixture in 2006, this time played at Oxford. He scored 71 runs in his two matches, with a high score of 38. He gained a cricket blue while at Oxford. In addition to playing first-class cricket, Stearn also played minor counties cricket for Bedfordshire from 2001–05, making six appearances in the Minor Counties Championship. After completing his studies he became a geography teacher, where he taught at Bedford School and King Edward's School, Birmingham. After running the Geography department at Cranleigh School for several years, he moved to and now works in Australia.
