= Laura Ashley (company) =

British textile design company

Laura Ashley Holdings
- Type: Public
- Industry: Home accessories; Furniture; Home decorating; Fashion; Hospitality
- Predecessor: Ashley Mountney Ltd, 1954
- Founded: 1954; 72 years ago in Pimlico, London, UK
- Founder: Laura Ashley; Bernard Ashley
- Headquarters: London, United Kingdom
- Area served: Worldwide
- Key people: Ng Kwan Cheong (CEO); Khoo Kay Peng (chairman); Seán Anglim (Finance director)
- Owner: Marquee Brands
- Website: www.lauraashley.com

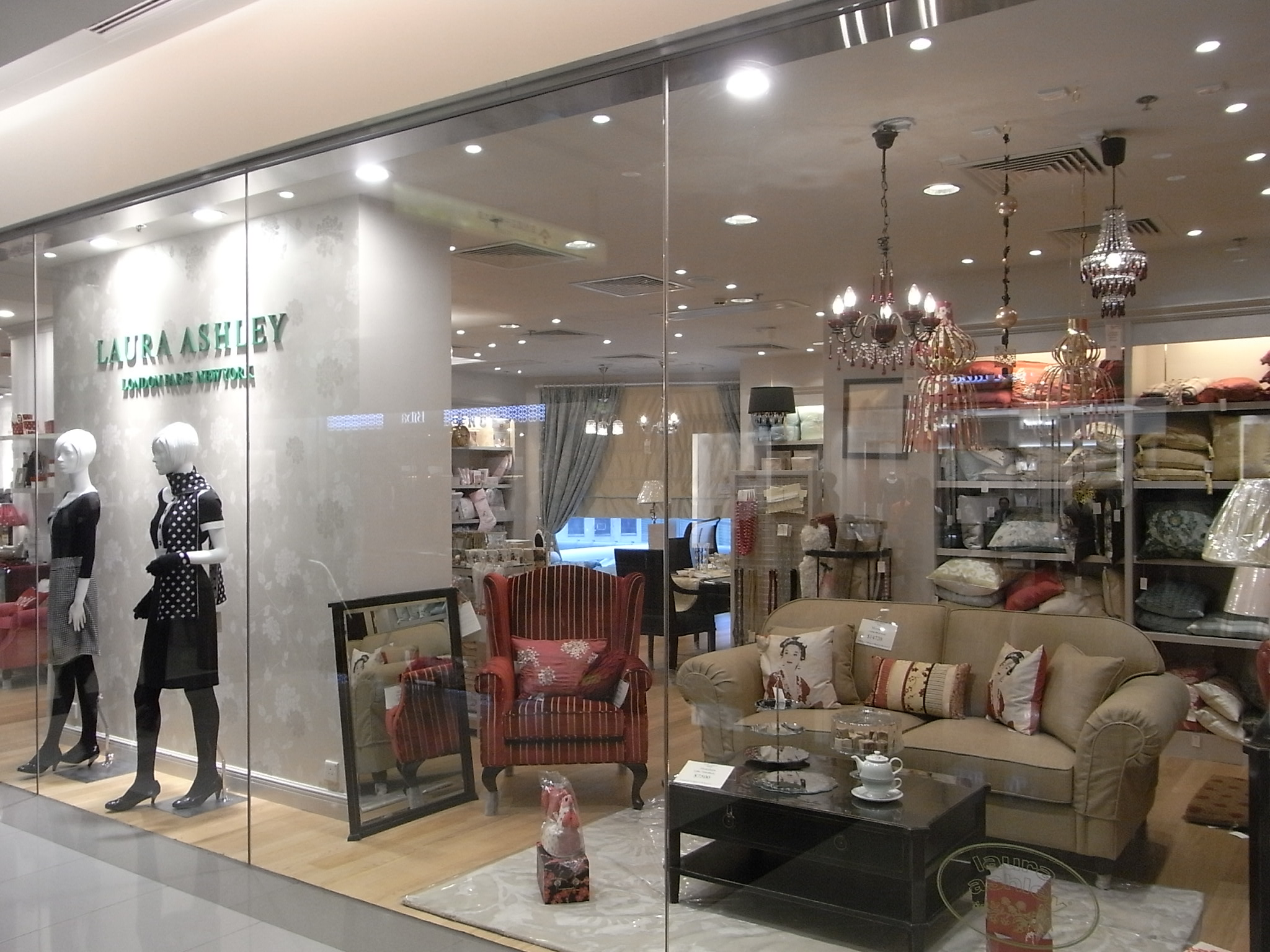
Laura Ashley shop, Hong Kong

Laura Ashley is a British textile design company. Founded by Laura Ashley and her husband Bernard Ashley in 1953 in London, it first became known for creating Victorian-style head scarves - one of which was worn by Audrey Hepburn in the film Roman Holiday.

The firm relocated to Wales in 1961, and later grew to become an international retail chain with more than 500 stores, selling clothing and household goods. In 1985, it was taken public after the death of its founder. Its products have been described as 'quintessentially English.'

After it filed for administration in March 2020, the company was relaunched following its sale to Gordon Brothers. In January 2025, it was sold to Marquee Brands.

== History ==
=== Origins ===
Bernard Ashley met Welsh secretary Laura Mountney at a youth club in Wallington, London. While working as a secretary and raising her first two children, part-time she designed napkins, table mats, and tea-towels which Bernard printed on a machine he had designed in an attic flat in Pimlico, London. The couple had invested £10 in wood for the screen frame, dyes and a few yards of linen. Laura's inspiration to start producing printed fabric came from a Women's Institute display of traditional handicrafts at the Victoria & Albert Museum. When Laura looked for fabric carrying Victorian designs to help her make patchwork, she found no such thing existed. Here was an opportunity, and she started to print Victorian style headscarves in 1953.

Audrey Hepburn appeared alongside Gregory Peck in the 1953 film Roman Holiday, wearing a Laura Ashley headscarf. As a fashion icon, she instantly created a style that became popular around the globe. The Ashleys' scarves quickly became successful with stores, retailing both via mail order and high street chains such as John Lewis.

From 1953, Bernard left his city job and the couple began to expand the company, initially named Ashley Mountney Ltd incorporating Laura Ashley's maiden name. Laura designed the prints and Bernard built the printing equipment, so forging a complementary partnership that was to give the company its unique strength throughout the years. Laura remained in charge of design until shortly before her death, while Bernard handled the operational side.

Employing staff to cope with the growth of sales, the company name was changed to Laura Ashley because Bernard felt a woman's name was more appropriate for the type of products.

=== Expansion ===
The new company moved to Kent in 1955, but the business was nearly wiped out in 1958, when the River Darent overflowed – leaving equipment, dyes, and fabrics floating in three feet of water.

Turnover rose from £2,000 to £8,000 in 1960, which left them looking for new premises. As the new M4 Motorway had just been built, Laura suggested Wales as there was much space, and driving up the new road one weekend, found a suitable house and shop available for a sum below their residual savings in Machynlleth, Powys.

The family moved to Wales in 1961, just after the birth of their third child. The first shop opened at 35 Maengwyn Street, which still today trades as an interior design shop, and the Laura Ashley association is commemorated by a small plaque. The family lived above the shop for six years before moving to Carno, Montgomeryshire.

The Ashleys' first Welsh factory was originally located in the social club in Carno; in 1967, the factory moved across to the village's former railway station.

These were crucial times in the development of the company. Bernard had developed his flat-bed printing process to produce 5,000 metres of fabric per week, and, in 1966, Laura produced her first dress for social rather than work attire. The long length silhouette became the Laura Ashley trademark. It also was to work successfully in the company's favour, as fashion switched from the mini to the maxi skirt at the end of the 1960s. A newspaper suggested that by donning a Laura Ashley number, women could look as beautiful as Katharine Ross in the film Butch Cassidy and the Sundance Kid.

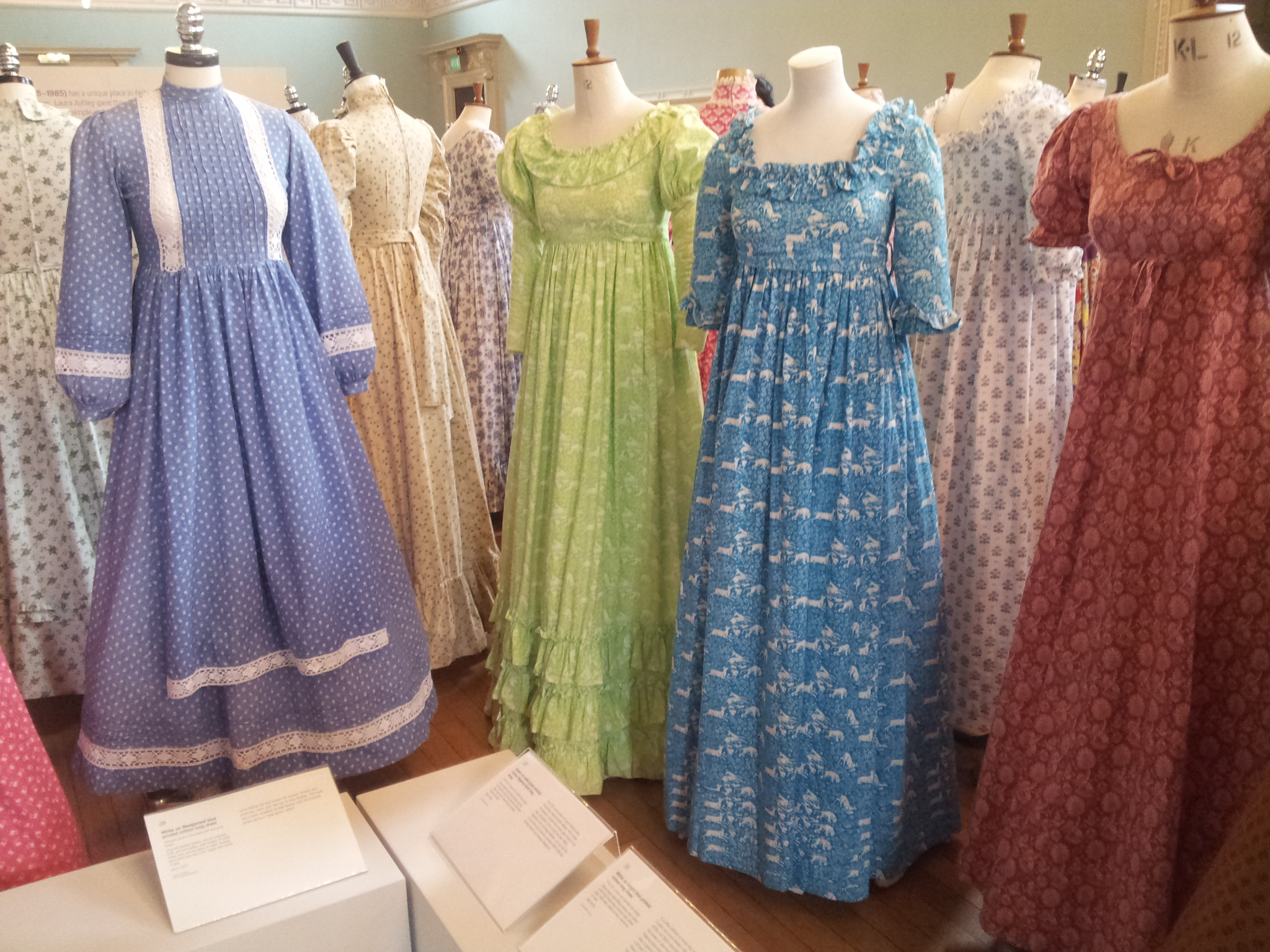
1970s Laura Ashley dresses on display in the Fashion Museum, Bath, in 2013.

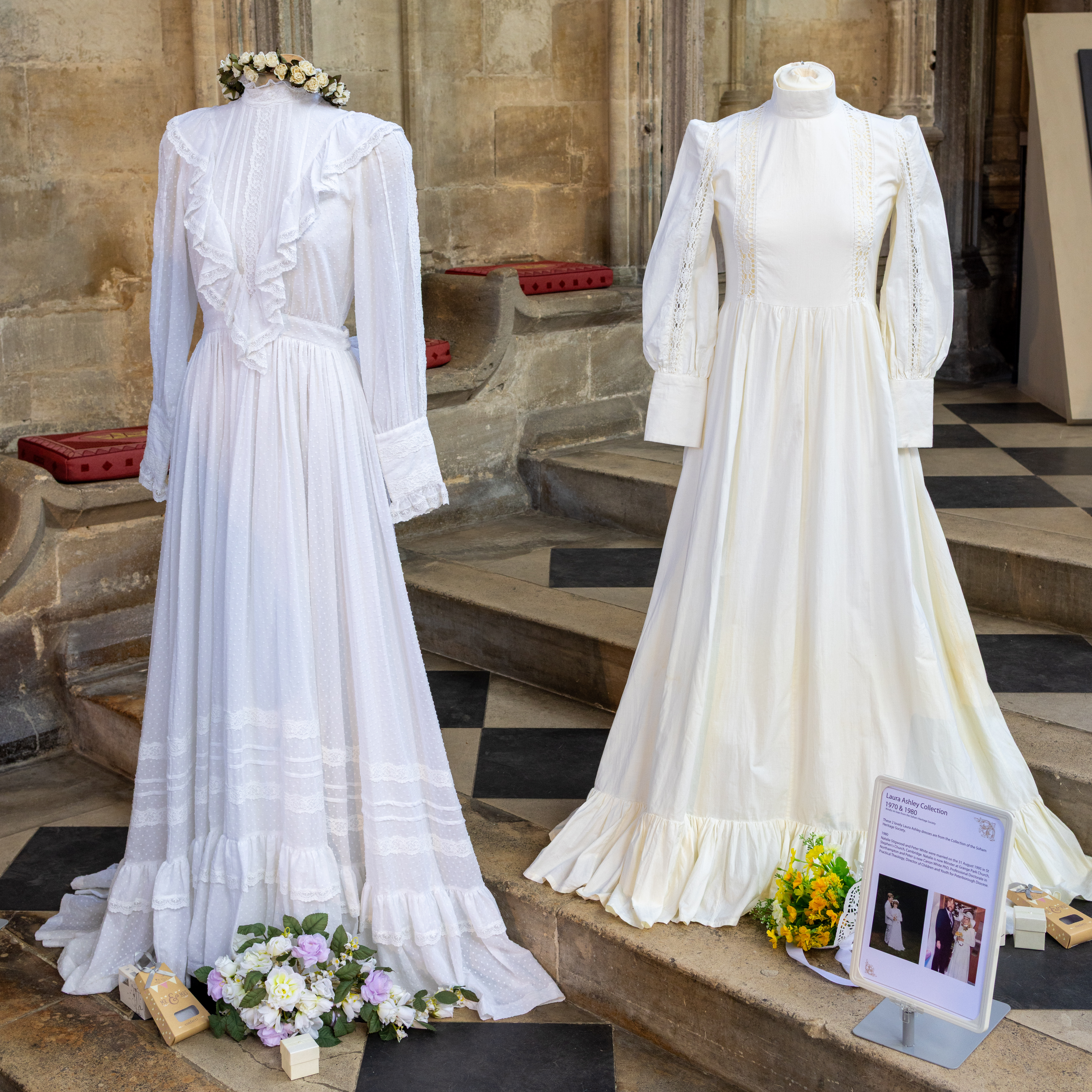
1970 and 1980 Laura Ashley wedding dresses

=== Retail shops ===
The first shop under the Laura Ashley name opened in Pelham Street, South Kensington, in 1968, with additional shops opened in Shrewsbury and Bath in 1970. In one week alone, London's Fulham Road shop sold 4,000 dresses – which resulted in the new factory in Newtown, Montgomeryshire. It was the opening of the Paris shop in 1974, which was the first to feature the distinctive green frontage and stripped wooden interior; and in the same year the first U.S. shop opened in San Francisco. A licensing operation led to the opening of department store concessions in Australia, Canada, and Japan from 1971 onwards.

By 1975, turnover was £5 million per year and the company employed 1,000 people worldwide. Laura turned down the offer of an OBE because her husband Bernard was not also offered the honour, but a Queen's Award for Export was accepted in 1977. Turnover reached £25 million in 1979, and a range of perfume was launched. The addition of a home in France enabled Laura to go back to her roots of fabric design, and the company launched its home furnishings collections. At one point the company was the largest employer in north Powys, with an excess of 13,000 staff in 500 shops and 13 factories according the BBC. In 1982, the book The Laura Ashley Book of Home Decorating was published.

By the time of Laura Ashley's death in 1985, the company had over 220 stores around the world, employed over 4,000 people and turned over US$130 million annually. The New York Times wrote of Ashley’s style of fashion: “With their high necks, full skirts, mutton sleeves, and lace and ruffle adornments, these dresses, along with prim pin-tucked cotton blouses, lace-trimmed nightgowns, and grosgrain-ribbon-tied hats, solidified the ‘Laura Ashley look.’”

== Public company ==
Two months after Laura Ashley's death in 1985, Laura Ashley Holdings plc went public in a flotation that was 34 times oversubscribed. That same year, the first store in Japan was opened in Tokyo. Chairman Bernard Ashley accepted a knighthood in 1987, the same year in which the company opened a new factory, called Texplan, for printing fabrics and wallpapers, and launched new child and home furnishings ranges.

In the early 1990s, Laura Ashley plc was suffering from a combination of over expansion of its retail outlets and dependence on what had become an overly complex and costly outsourced network of manufacturers. In 1991, American James Maxmin became the CEO at Laura Ashley, aiming to refocus the company on its core business. Over the next two and a half years, Maxmin led a series of changes, addressing problems in manufacturing and logistics that foreshadowed principles of his later book, The Support Economy, co-authored with his wife, Harvard Business School Professor Shoshana Zuboff. One of the most significant initiatives at this time was a strategic alliance with FedEx, forming a sort of proto-federation, aimed at improving distribution for close to 500 Laura Ashley stores. The alliance was established as a 10-year partnership, but it was relatively open-ended, premised on trust. The objective was to be able to supply 99 percent of Laura Ashley's merchandise to customers anywhere in the world within 48 hours. The alliance replaced a legacy system that would route a T-shirt manufactured in Hong Kong to a warehouse in Newtown, Wales, before sending it to a retail store in Japan.

In 1992, Maxmin led Laura Ashley to its first profits since 1989, and, in 1993, profits were expected to reach £12 million. Laura Ashley plc celebrated its 40th anniversary in 1993, the same year that Sir Bernard retired as chairman and became honorary life president. But in early April 1994, Maxmin abruptly resigned from Laura Ashley, citing major differences with Sir Bernard over strategy. Over the next five years, four individuals were given the Chief Executive role in quick succession in an attempt to find a solution to the growing financial difficulties of the company, during which time the company's bankers became increasingly concerned. A new source of finance was desperately needed, and this was found in 1998, in a new relationship with the Malaysian MUI Group. Laura Ashley closed its last rural factory in Wales in 1999.

== MUI Asia management ==
In May 1998, MUI Asia Limited became a major shareholder in Laura Ashley Holdings plc and under the new management, this world famous international brand was back in profit. Rescued from the receivers in 1998, 58 per cent of the shares are believed to be controlled directly or indirectly by the company's chairman Dr Khoo Kay Peng. Part of the rescue of the parent company involved selling off the United States operations for the sum of $1, the buyer being a company also controlled by MUI. All retail stores were subsequently closed and the Laura Ashley brand is now represented in the USA through its e-commerce business.

Laura Ashley experienced several setbacks in the early years of the new century. In October 2002, it launched a £18m lawsuit against L'Oréal, which manufactured the Laura Ashley perfumes; Laura Ashley was eventually awarded a reduced amount of damages, which however, did not even cover the legal costs of the suit. By 2003, Laura Ashley closed all of its North American stores in order to focus on the UK market. A positive direction seemed to be underway early in 2004 with the establishment of a relationship with Scottish couture designer Alistair Blair, who had previously designed for Dior and Givenchy, and soon afterwards the company posted a profit compared with the loss of the previous year, especially on the back of an expansion of home furnishing sales although clothing sales continued to decline. However, by the end of the year the arrangement with Blair was terminated. Laura Ashley closed its flagship store on London's Regent Street in late 2005 because of rent increases.

Despite these issues, profitability seemed to be returning to the company in the years immediately prior to the 2008 financial crisis. Profits for 2005 stood at £6.1 million, and this figure was doubled in 2006 to £12.2 million, representing the strongest performance since the MUI buyout. Both fashion and home accessories were attributed as strong areas for the company at this time.

There were some areas of concern emerging at the start of the 2008 financial crisis. The company was criticised in 2009 for price discrepancies, which meant Irish customers were charged more than their UK counterparts for the same items, a situation which Laura Ashley justified. The following year the company was involved in an acrimonious industrial dispute, again in the Republic of Ireland. In 2011, the company was found to be in breach of fair employment conditions in a case raised in Northern Ireland and was required to pay compensation to the aggrieved employee. In 2012, the company responded with complacency to a significant number of negative online consumer reviews, pointing to improving sales and profitability figures, but the Financial Times, perhaps somewhat prophetically, commented "Laura Ashley may be right to shrug off online criticism. However, no company can expect to do well for ever. Web reviews, particularly when many persistently repeat the same complaints, may indicate looming difficulties".

Some signs of weakness in the company were seen when, in early 2016, Laura Ashley's Australian operations entered voluntary administration, but they managed to trade out of the difficulties and in the event remained afloat for more than a further two years.

There were some changes and pull-backs for Laura Ashley internationally in 2018. Early in the year, the long-standing relationship with Japanese company Aeon was terminated by Aeon due to reduced profitability of their Laura Ashley operations. All 120 stores in Japan closed in September that year. However, as the Aeon relationship was expiring in September 2018, it was announced that the Master Licence arrangement previously with Aeon had been taken up by the large Itochu Corporation which already had diverse interests in the textiles field. Itochu announced that they intended to "expand the offering at major department stores [and] specialty stores ... and showcase the appeal of the brand to new customer groups through an official e-commerce site and directly managed shops ... with target retail sales of 8.0 billion yen in three years".

At the very end of the year, Laura Ashley Australia suddenly went into administration, and when no buyer for the operation was found, all stores across Australia, as well as the online business, ceased operating at the end of 2018. New chairman Andrew Khoo was upbeat at the year's end, looking to expand Laura Ashley's online sales and perhaps later a physical presence in the Chinese market.

Setbacks were also experienced in the UK operation. In December 2018, it was announced that 40 stores would close due to poor trading conditions. In February 2019, anticipated poor performance for the financial year was flagged, though an expansion of online sales and hospitality ventures were identified as areas of growth. In August 2019, an expanded annual loss was announced, brought about by declining sales of traditional mainstay products even as new ventures in tearooms and hotels were expanding.

In 2020, immediately following the COVID-19 outbreak, Laura Ashley said it would file for administration. According to Sky News, the company became one of the first large UK companies to do so as a result of the pandemic. At this time, the company had 150 retail locations.

== Gordon Brothers management ==
On 22 April 2020, it was announced that investment firm Gordon Brothers had acquired the Laura Ashley brand name, archives and intellectual property rights out of administration. In October 2020, it was announced that Laura Ashley would return with a flagship store in the Westfield Shopping Centre in West London in 2021 through Next's 500 UK stores & website, and with a series of new stores. That year, they also released a collaborated line with dressmaker Batsheva.

In 2022, they partnered with IMG to reestablish their presence in China, India, Europe, Australia, New Zealand, and the Middle East. That year, Laura Ashley partnered with Mamas & Papas to design a line of baby clothing, nursery bedding, toys, and pushchairs. They also partnered with Baggu on a line of bags, and partnered with companies Graham & Brown as well as Ashley Wilde. By the end of 2022, there were 600 retailers that had Laura Ashley in stock alongside its own stores, and the company had a portfolio of in excess of 3,000 products.

In 2023, the company celebrated its 70th anniversary with events including a quilt exhibition and heritage exhibit held in Newtown, Wales. A heritage plaque was laid by the City of Newtown discussing the company’s founding as a part of the event. That year, Laura Ashley partnered for a new line with Lucky Brand.

== Senior management ==
=== Chief Executive Officers ===
- 1976–1990 – John James
- 1991–1993 – Jim Maxmin
- 1993–1995 – A. Schouten
- 1995–1997 – Ann Iverson
- 1997–1998 – David Hoare
- 1998–1999 – Victoria Egan
- 1999–2020 – Ng Kwan Cheong
- 2020–present – Katharine Poulter
