= Laura Ashley =

Welsh fashion designer and businesswoman (1925–1985)

- Ashley in the 1960s
- Born: Laura Mountney; 7 September 1925; Dowlais, Merthyr Tydfil, Wales
- Died: 17 September 1985 (aged 60); Coventry, West Midlands, England
- Resting place: St. John the Baptist Church, Carno, Wales
- Education: Marshall's School, Merthyr Tydfill; Elmwood School, Croydon
- Occupation: Fashion designer/businesswoman
- Known for: Founder
- Spouse: Bernard Ashley (m. 1949)
- Children: 4

Laura Ashley (née Mountney; 7 September 1925 – 17 September 1985) was a Welsh fashion designer and businesswoman, who founded the eponymous fashion retailer. She originally made furnishing materials in the 1950s, expanding the business into clothing design and manufacture in the 1960s. The Laura Ashley style is characterised by Romantic designs – often with a 19th-century rural feel – and the use of natural fabrics.

== Early life ==
Ashley was born at her grandmother's home, 31 Station Terrace, Dowlais, Merthyr Tydfil, Wales. She was raised in a civil service family as a Strict Baptist. The chapel she attended in Dowlais (Hebron) was Welsh language and although she could not understand it, she loved it, especially the singing. Educated at Marshall's School in Merthyr Tydfil until 1932, she was then sent to the Elmwood School, Croydon. She was evacuated back to Wales aged 13, but with so many World War II evacuees there were no school places left and she attended Aberdare Secretarial School.

An apron that purports to be the first garment made by her when a teenager hangs in the dining room of the Llangoed Hall Hotel near Brecon in Powys.

In 1942, at age 16, she left school and served in the Women's Royal Naval Service. During this period she met engineer Bernard Ashley at a youth club in Wallington. After the war, Bernard was posted to India with the Gurkhas, and the pair corresponded by letter. From 1945 to 1952, she worked as a secretary for the National Federation of Women's Institutes in London, marrying Bernard in 1949.

== The company ==
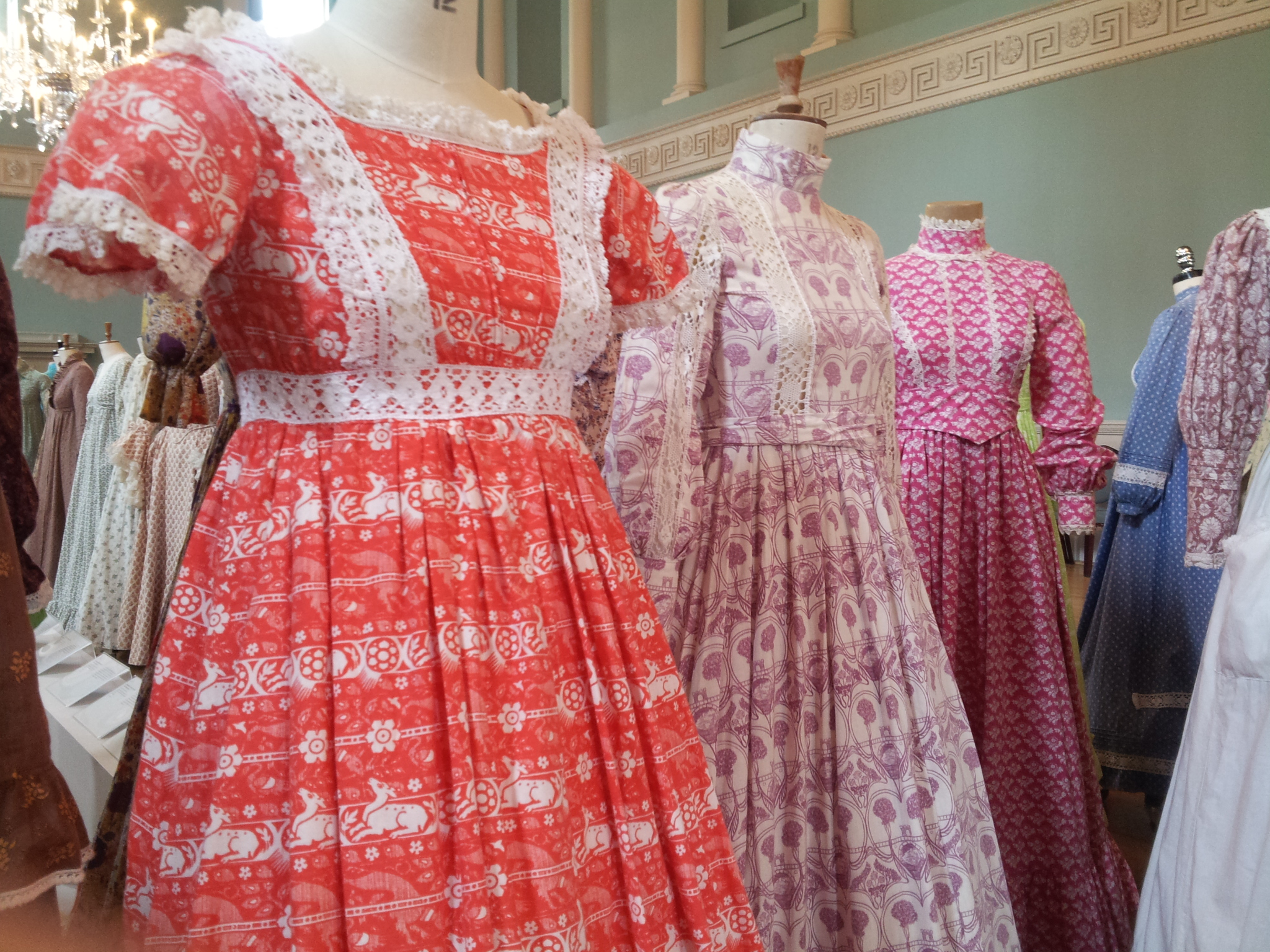
1970s printed cotton dresses by Laura Ashley exhibited at the Fashion Museum, Bath, in 2013

While working as a secretary and raising her first two children, Ashley undertook some development work for the Women's Institute on quilting. Revisiting the craft she had learnt with her grandmother, she began designing headscarves, napkins, table mats and tea-towels which Bernard printed on a machine he had designed in their attic flat at 83 Cambridge Street, Pimlico, London.

The couple had invested £10 in wood for the screen frame, dyes and a few yards of linen. Ashley's inspiration to start producing printed fabric came from a Women's Institute display of traditional handicrafts at the Victoria & Albert Museum. When Ashley looked for small patches carrying Victorian designs to help her make patchworks, she found no such thing existed. Here was an opportunity, and she started to print Victorian style headscarves in 1953.

The scarves quickly became successful – retailing both via mail order and at high street chains such as John Lewis – and Bernard left his City job to print fabrics full-time. The company was originally registered as Ashley Mountney (Laura's maiden name), but Bernard changed the name to Laura Ashley because he felt a woman's name was more appropriate for the type of products they were producing. The new company moved to Kent in 1955, but when the third of their four children was born, the family moved to Wales in 1960.

Laura Ashley's first shop was opened at 35 Maengwyn Street, Machynlleth, Montgomeryshire, in 1961.

== Personal life ==
Laura and Bernard Ashley had four children who were all involved with the business. David (born 1954/55), the eldest son, designed the shops; one of the daughters, Jane, was the company photographer; another daughter, Emma, and their second son, Nick, were part of the company's fashion design team. Bernard was the company chairman and Laura kept a close eye on fabrics. The success of the business meant that the Ashleys could afford a yacht, a private plane, the French Château de Remaisnil in Picardy, and Rhydoldog House, a mansion near Rhayader, Powys, Wales, a town-house in Brussels, and the villa Contenta in Lyford Cay, New Providence, Bahamas.

=== Death ===
In 1985, just after her 60th birthday, Laura Ashley fell down the stairs of her daughter's home in the West Midlands and was taken to hospital in Coventry, where she died ten days later of a brain haemorrhage. She is buried in the churchyard of St John the Baptist, in Carno, Wales.

== Legacy ==
Two months after her death in 1985, Laura Ashley Holdings went public in a flotation that was 34 times oversubscribed. A memorial plaque to Laura Ashley, at the family's former home of 83 Cambridge Street, Pimlico, was unveiled on 5 July 1994.

Sir Bernard Ashley died of cancer on 14 February 2009.

Her house, Rhydoldog House, was bought in 2021 by Charlotte Church for a wellbeing retreat.

== Foundation ==
The Laura Ashley Foundation was set up in 1987; as the Foundation has been run by the late Sir Bernard and their children, the strategy has evolved from purely funding the arts to also funding broader community and social welfare projects. It was this evolution that prompted the change of name in 2011 from The Laura Ashley Foundation to The Ashley Family Foundation.
