= Samuel Hambleton (naval officer) =

18th-century U.S. naval officer

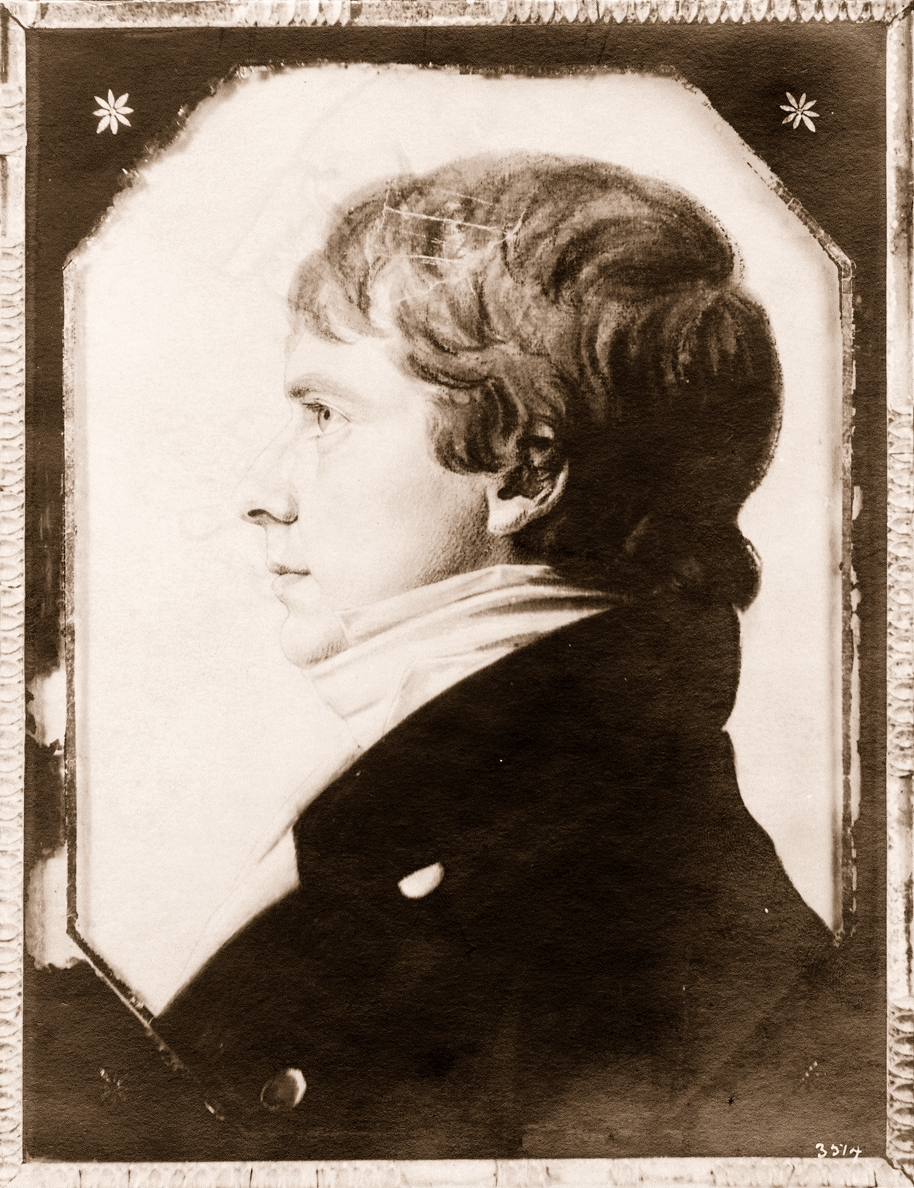
- Purser Samuel Hambleton, from a chalk drawing by Saint-Mémin, c. 1806
- Born: 1777; Talbot County, Maryland, U.S.
- Died: 1851 (aged 73–74); Talbot County, Maryland, U.S.
- Military career
- Branch: United States Navy
- Service years: 1806–1832
- Rank: Lieutenant
- Conflicts: War of 1812; Battle of Lake Erie

Samuel Hambleton (1777–1851) was a United States Navy officer who served during the War of 1812.

== Early life ==
Samuel Hambleton was born on 29 March 1777 in Talbot County, Maryland at "Martingham", an estate granted to his great-great-grandfather, William Hambleton, by Lord Baltimore in 1657.

== Career ==
Entering the Navy and becoming a Purser of the Navy on 6 December 1806, he served as Acting Lieutenant in Lawrence during the Battle of Lake Erie in the War of 1812. He was a journalist and letter-writer. Hambleton's wartime journal is housed at the Maryland Historical Society, has become one of the most-used primary sources by historians researching the Battle of Lake Erie.

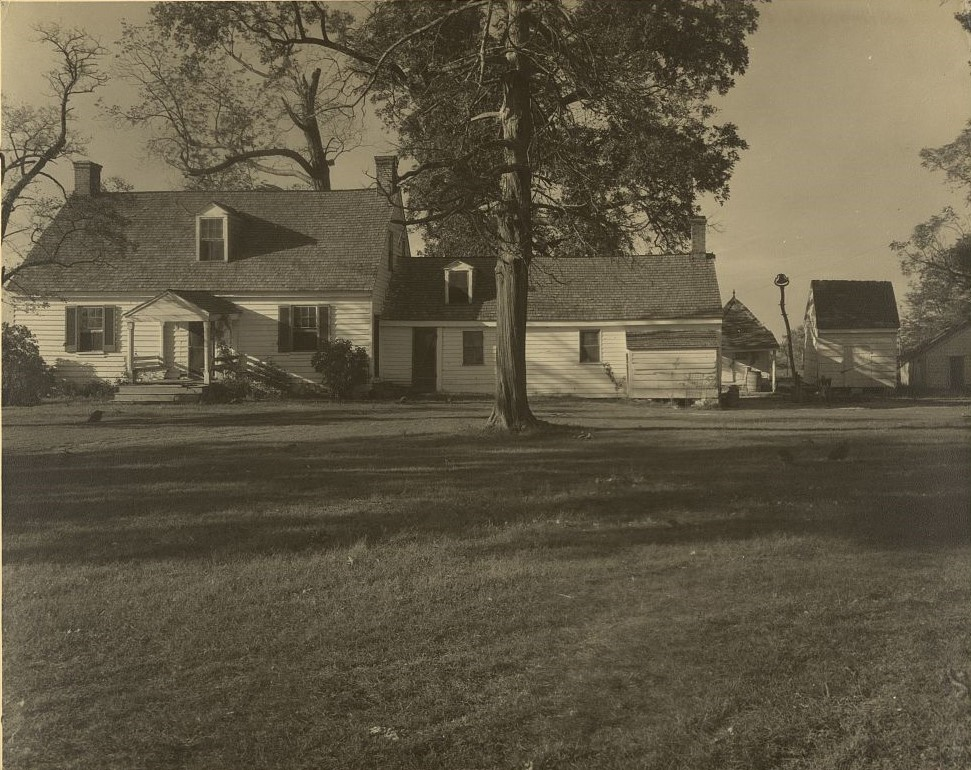
West Martingham, St. Michaels, built 1659, by Frances Benjamin Johnston, 1936–37

Samuel Hambleton, being eight years older than Oliver Hazard Perry, became Perry's most trusted officer and confidant. In July, 1813, when Perry suggested to Hambleton that he needed a signal flag to let his fleet know when to engage the British, it was Samuel Hambleton who suggested using the words of Captain James Lawrence, "Don't Give Up The Ship." Perhaps not sure if reminding his men of Lawrence's death and the loss of his ship Chesapeake would be inspiring or demoralizing, Perry slept on the idea before agreeing to it the next day. Hambleton had the flag sewn by women of Erie, Pennsylvania and it was presented to Perry's captains the evening before the Battle of Lake Erie, and to his men aboard Lawrence on the day of the Battle.

Hambleton's battle flag

During the battle, Perry's next-in-command, Captain Jesse Elliott, failed to bring his brig "Niagara" into range to engage the British. As a result, Perry's brig, "Lawrence" sustained damage until it was a floating wreck. Perry and Hambleton together worked the last working gun aboard "Lawrence" until it, too, failed. With most of his men dead or wounded, Perry called for someone to lower the battle flag that Hambleton had designed, and then had his men row him through constant sniper fire (reportedly shooting one oar in half) back to the "Niagara", when he relieved Elliott of duty and took command. After sailing the fresh ship back into battle, he overpowered the remaining enemy ships. He sent home the message penciled on the back of an envelope, "We have met the enemy, and they are ours...."

Commodore Oliver Hazard Perry commended Hambleton for gallant conduct in encouraging his men and personally working the last operable gun aboard against the enemy. Hambleton was severely wounded by a cannonball falling from the rigging, but continued fighting. He continued working in the days following the Battle without seeking medical attention until the infection became so severe that the wound was lanced, discharging pieces of broken bone from his shoulder blade. A piece of the bone was sent home to his mother in a letter, and is currently displayed with the letter at the Chesapeake Bay Maritime Museum.

Following the Battle of Lake Erie, Hambleton returned home to St. Michaels, Maryland and built a home which he named Perry Cabin after his friend Oliver Hazard Perry. It was eventually expanded by subsequent owners into Inn at Perry Cabin, a well-known luxury hotel and spa. He named the adjoining farmland Navy Point after the branch of service he loved. Navy Point today contains the 18-acre campus of the Chesapeake Bay Maritime Museum.

Samuel Hambleton's trunk, with his initials and ornate metalwork on the lid, was discovered in the home of his great niece in the "Hambleton House" in Easton, Maryland in the 1960s. The trunk included his personal papers as well as Hambleton's Congressional Medal commemorating his service at the Battle of Lake Erie. It is currently held in the collection of the Historical Society of Talbot County.

Until 1832 Purser Hambleton served actively in the Navy, attached to Java and Columbus during Mediterranean cruises and to John Adams and Erie in the West Indies. With the exception of a tour of duty at the Philadelphia Navy Yard from 1843 to 1845, Hambleton remained on leave or waiting order from 1832 until his death.

== Death ==
Hambleton died on 17 January 1851 in Talbot County. He was buried in the family cemetery at Old Martingham.

== Namesake ==
In 1941, the destroyer USS Hambleton (DD-455) was named in his honor.
