= Billington, Bedfordshire =

Civil parish in Bedfordshire, England

Coordinates: 51.896°N 0.635°W

Billington
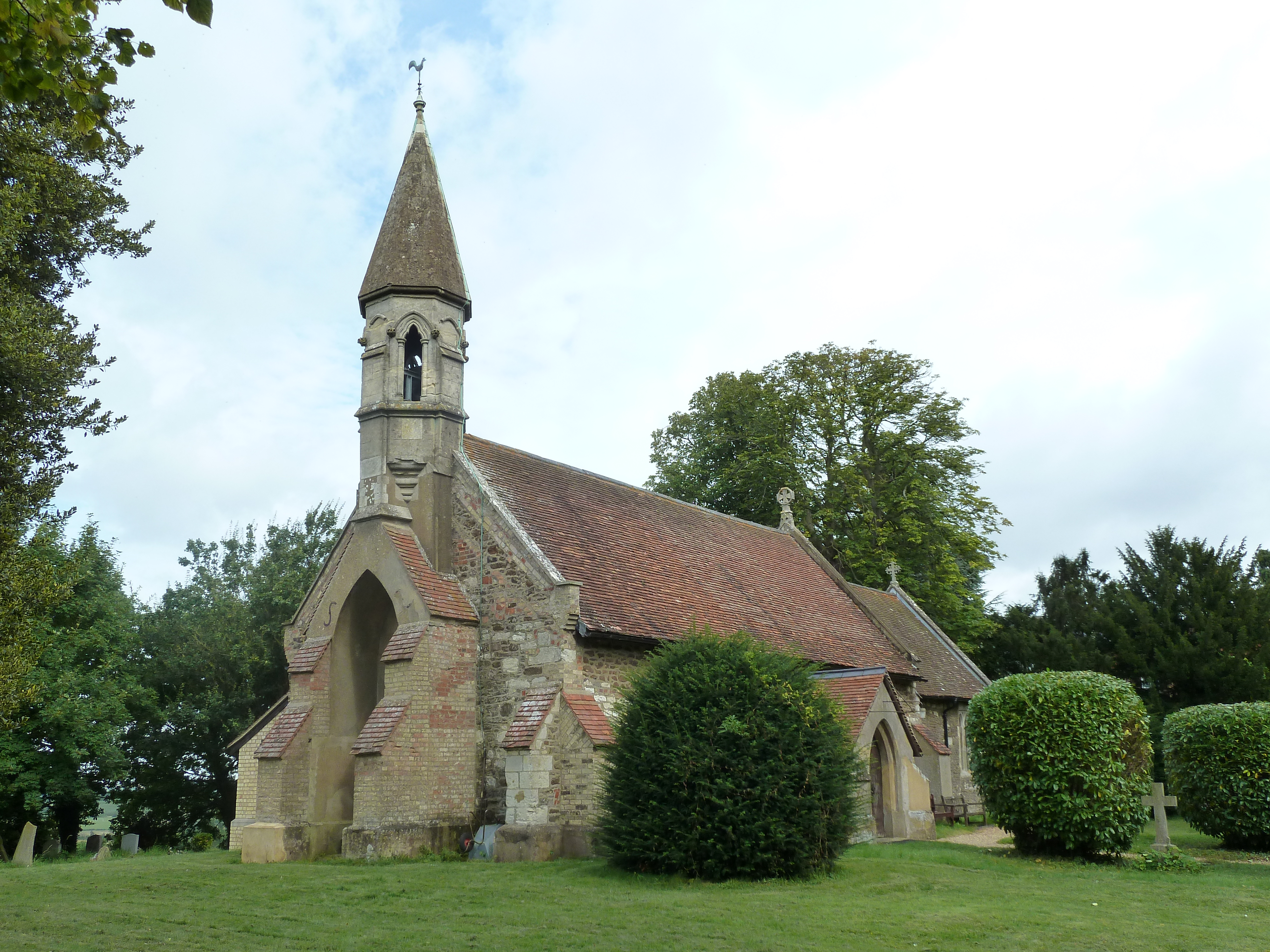
- Parish church of St Michael and All Angels, Great Billington

- Location within Bedfordshire
- Population: 359
- OS grid reference: SP9422
- Civil parish: Great Billington
- Unitary authority: Central Bedfordshire
- Ceremonial county: Bedfordshire
- Region: East
- Country: England
- Sovereign state: United Kingdom
- Post town: LEIGHTON BUZZARD
- Postcode district: LU7
- Dialling code: 01525
- Police: Bedfordshire
- Fire: Bedfordshire
- Ambulance: East of England
- UK Parliament: South West Bedfordshire

Billington is a civil parish in Bedfordshire about 3 miles (4.8 km) south of Leighton Buzzard and not far from the Buckinghamshire border. There are two settlements: Little Billington (a hamlet in the west of the parish) and one that is now called Great Billington (straddling the A4146). At the 2021 census, the parish had a population of 359.

The name of the parish is recorded in 1196 as Billendon, and may come from Anglo-Saxon language Billan dūn = "hill of a man named Billa". Another theorized original meaning is "hill with a sharp ridge". The spelling Billyngdon appears in a legal record, dated 1440, where Hugh and Thomas Billyngdon of Billyngdon, Beds, gentlemen, are mentioned.

The village is known for its high density of Travellers, who outnumber the settled community. This community live in privately owned, but permitted, sites in the village, three in Little Billington and one between Billington and the nearby village of Stanbridge.

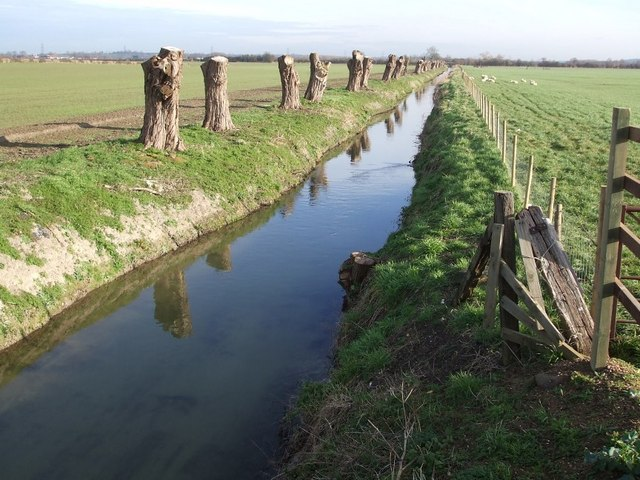
The River Ouzel at Great Billington

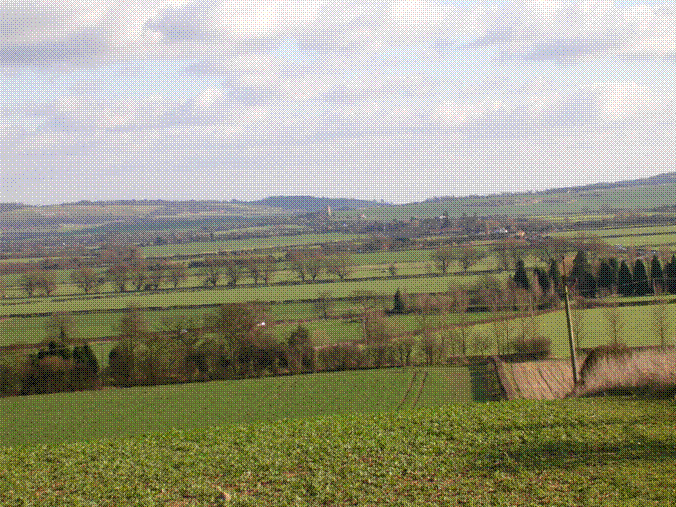
View from summit of Billington Hill, looking towards Edlesborough and the Chiltern Hills

The centre of Great Billington is Billington Hill, on top of which is the small parish church. The church was originally a small mediaeval chapel; however, in the late 1860s it was enlarged to a church, and a rectory built next to it to house the first incumbent. This was when Billington was first recorded as a parish in its own right. The bell turret of the church (it has no tower) came to the church secondhand, from the church at nearby Linslade, which was being enlarged at the time. The interior of the church is very simple; a small stained glass window in the west wall commemorates Edward Bradshaw, the first rector.

The village once had a common, where the peasants cultivated their own strips of land; the name 'common' still survives as a field name. It was enclosed at the time of the enclosures, and is today part of a local farm. It is traversed by two public footpaths.

The village contains some half-timbered thatched cottages, in the area around the summit of the hill, and also some old farmhouses and cottages. One of the thatched cottages on top of the hill has the dubious honour of having featured on countless chocolate boxes and biscuit tins. One of the more attractive houses in the village is Walkers Farm, a brick and timber house dating from the 16th century. Its once-thatched roof is now tiled.

During the late 1870s and early 1880 large areas of the village were bought by Arthur Macnamara who built at this time the manor house, and transformed the village into a typical Victorian estate village. The village school, halfway up the hill, was built at this time. It closed in the 1950s.

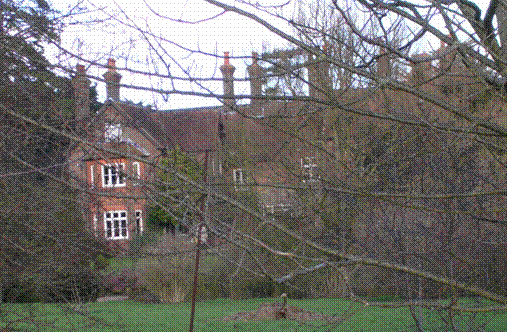
The Manor House. built by Arthur Macnamara at Billington

In the early 20th century a point-to-point course was built on the estate, people came from all over England to attend the race meeting held there. Edward VIII when Prince of Wales was a frequent competitor at the races. The races discontinued after World War II.

== Use of the name Great Billington ==
Mapmakers, from Thomas Jefferys in 1765 to the Ordnance Survey in 2006, have consistently written the word "Billington" next to the settlement by the church and the words "Little Billington" next to the hamlet of that name.

In the 1990s, there was a campaign by villagers to use the name "Great Billington", with a claim that it was always used historically. This is not the case in most books on local history and place-names, but there are examples of earlier use in a will dated 1543, Kelly's Directory ("comprising Great and Little Billington"), the Victoria County History ("hamlets of Great and Little Billington"), and the Royal Mail Postcode Directory (either "Great" or "Little" in the official postal addresses). As a result of the campaign, the county council unveiled a new "Great Billington" village sign on 20 June 1997, and some of the road signs at entrances to the settlement now use the name. On 1 September 1998 the parish was renamed from "Billington" to "Great Billington".

"Great Billington" has been used as the name of the whole civil parish, but the parish council now uses the name "Billington" again. The ecclesiastical parish is called "Billington". On 1 April 2019 the parish was renamed from "Great Billington" back to "Billington".

== 2012 slavery case ==
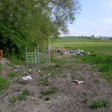
Public footpath through Billington's former common land, adjacent to the Traveller camp

On 11 July 2012, four members from one family were convicted of keeping workers in a state of servitude and forcing them to perform unpaid work. The family, who lived on one of the three travellers' sites in Little Billington, were found to have controlled, exploited, verbally abused and beaten the men for financial gain. The case was the first successful conviction under new slavery laws, following their introduction in 2010. The men, many of them homeless and addicted to alcohol or other drugs, were recruited outside jobcentres or at soup kitchens, and were promised paid work, food and lodgings. On arrival at the site, their heads were shaved, and they were forced to work up to 19 hours a day in the family's paving business. They were routinely abused, underfed, and housed in littered, cramped sheds or horseboxes that were unfit for human habitation, with no heating or running water. One victim was paid just £80 during the 15 years he was with the family. Victims who had managed to escape informed police. In September 2011 armed police raided the site with sniffer dogs and helicopter support, removing 23 men. Although some of the released men subsequently returned to the site, eight testified against the family in court. Two of the accused, a husband and wife, were jailed for 11 years and 4 years respectively.
