= Llyswen =

Coordinates: 52.03359°N 3.26672°W

- Location within Powys
- Principal area: Powys
- Preserved county: Powys
- Country: Wales
- Sovereign state: United Kingdom
- Post town: BRECON
- Postcode district: LD3
- Dialling code: 01874
- Police: Dyfed-Powys
- Fire: Mid and West Wales
- Ambulance: Welsh
- UK Parliament: Brecon, Radnor and Cwm Tawe
- Senedd Cymru – Welsh Parliament: Brecon & Radnorshire

Llyswen is a small village in Powys, Wales on the west bank of the River Wye. It was formerly within the county of Brecknockshire and now forms part of the Community of Bronllys. Until 1986 Llyswen was a community itself. The nearest town is Brecon approximately 8 miles (13 km) to the south-west.

== History ==
'Llys-wen' is Welsh for "The White Court" and the settlement is first mentioned as a site of a court where the sons of Rhodri Mawr, ninth century King of the Britons, might arbitrate their differences. It has been suggested that the remains of a hill fort above the village might be the location of this court.

=== Parish Church ===
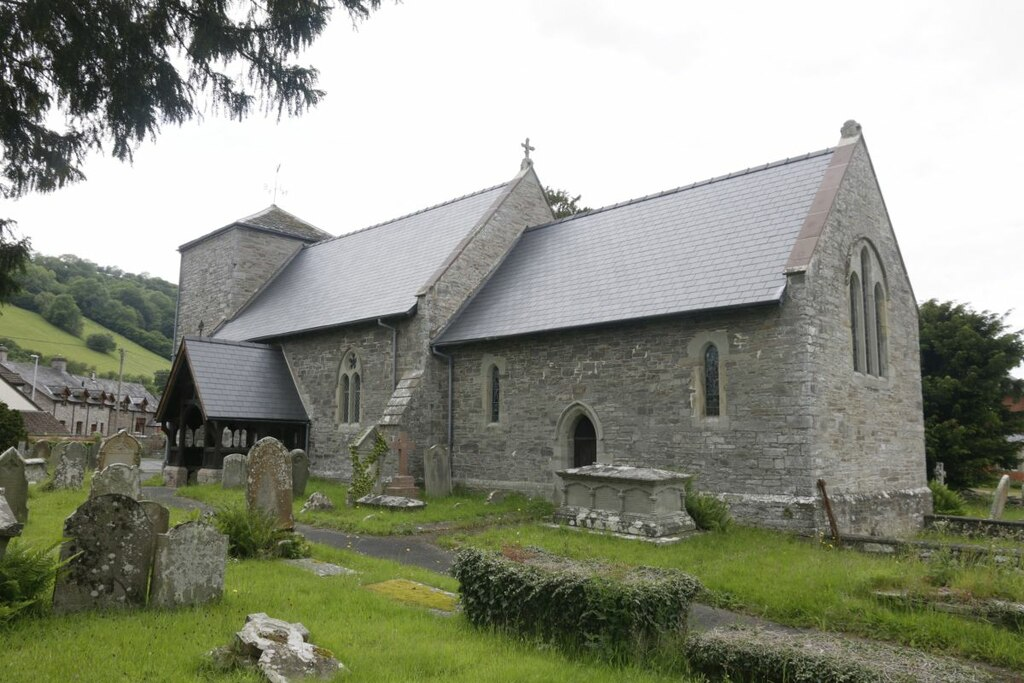
St Gwendoline's Church

The site of the parish church may be of equal age or older. It is dedicated to St Gwendoline, one of the many saintly offspring of King Brychan of Brycheiniog, who is said to have been killed by pagan Saxons and buried in nearby Talgarth. Unfortunately the church was destroyed and rebuilt in 1862 and only the Norman font remains. Unusually, this destruction (common in the Victorian period) drew adverse comment at the time. A contemporary editorial in Archaeologia Cambrensis said: "We are sorry to hear that this ancient edifice has been pulled down...We have no right...to remove the handiwork of our forefathers...It would be better to let the old buildings, plain or ugly as they may be, pass down unscathed to our children, who will have more respect for them than is shewn by ourselves."

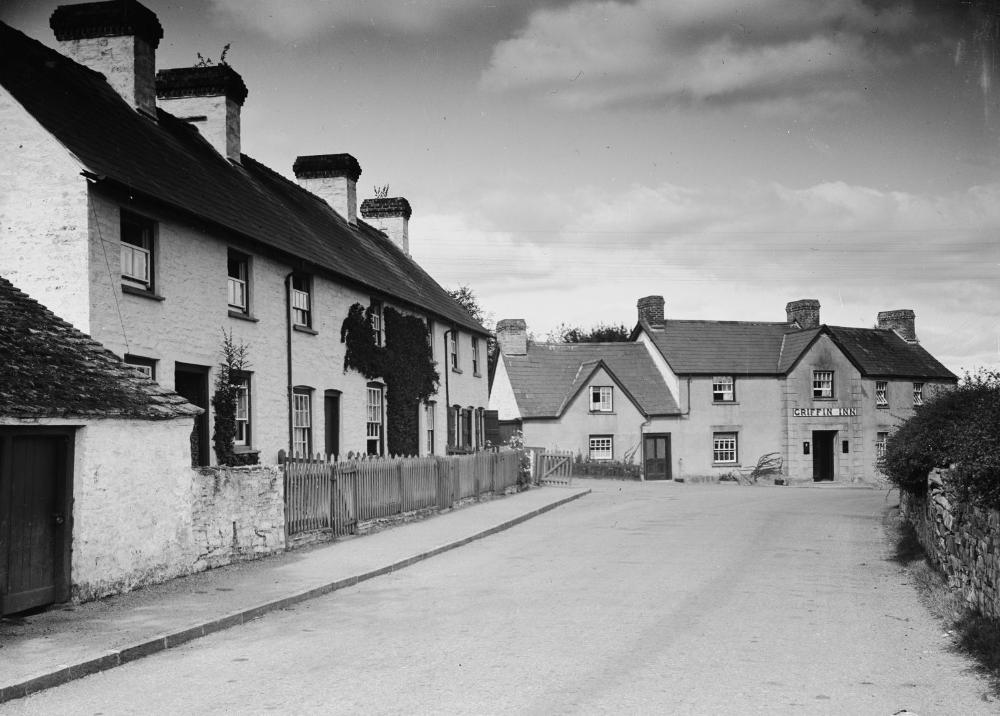
Photo taken by Percy Benzie Abery in the 1910s of village and inn.

=== Llyswen Castle ===
Following the Norman invasion of Wales, Llyswen became subject to the Marcher Lords and in the 12th century formed part of the lands of Walter de Clifford. Most villages in the area were fortified with a motte-and-bailey castle and a possible site for Llyswen Castle has been identified, though no supporting documentary evidence exists.

=== Llangoed Hall ===
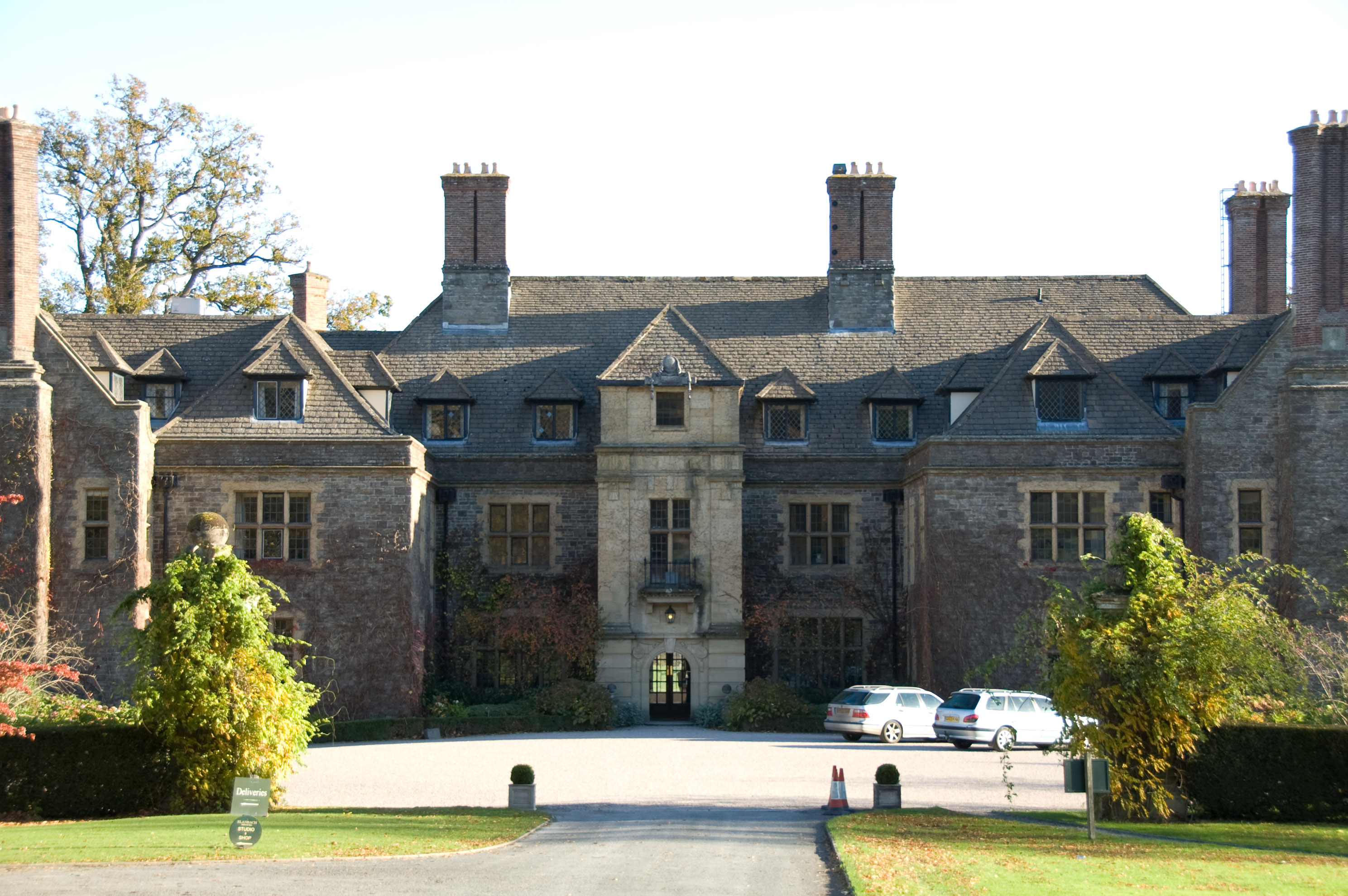
Llangoed Hall

Llangoed Hall to the north of the village was built in 1633 by the Williams family of Old Gwernyfed in nearby Aberllynfi. It was lost to the MacNamara family (apparently after a game of cards) in about 1800 and subsequently much rebuilt. A London hatter called Archibald Christy bought the house in about 1860 and later had it extensively redesigned by the architect Clough Williams-Ellis, who formed the romantic notion that it was the site of the original 'White Court'. In 1987 the house was bought and much restored in Edwardian style by Sir Bernard Ashley, who subsequently opened it as the Llangoed Hall Hotel and fabric design centre. It is now a grade II* listed building.

=== The Hermit of Llyswen ===
The romantic radical and poet John Thelwall built himself a "hermitage" at Llyswen Farm during his exile in Wales. His friends William and Dorothy Wordsworth and Samuel Taylor Coleridge visited him there in August 1798. The figure of "The Solitary" from Wordsworth's later poem 'The Excursion' may have been based on Thelwall in Llyswen.

== Today ==
A travel guide of 1847 referred to Llyswen as a "miserable village". Things have apparently improved since then. In 2008, Llyswen was judged one of the top ten most desirable British villages in which to live.
