= Corus Hotels =

Hotel chain

- Headquarters: Berkhamsted
- Number of locations: 10

Corus Hotels is a group of three hotels based in the UK, with two hotels in Malaysia. The hotels are owned by London Vista Hotel Limited, which is part of Malayan United Industries. The brand name was launched in 1998 by the Regal Hotel Group, in order to differentiate it from Regal Hotels International.

== History ==
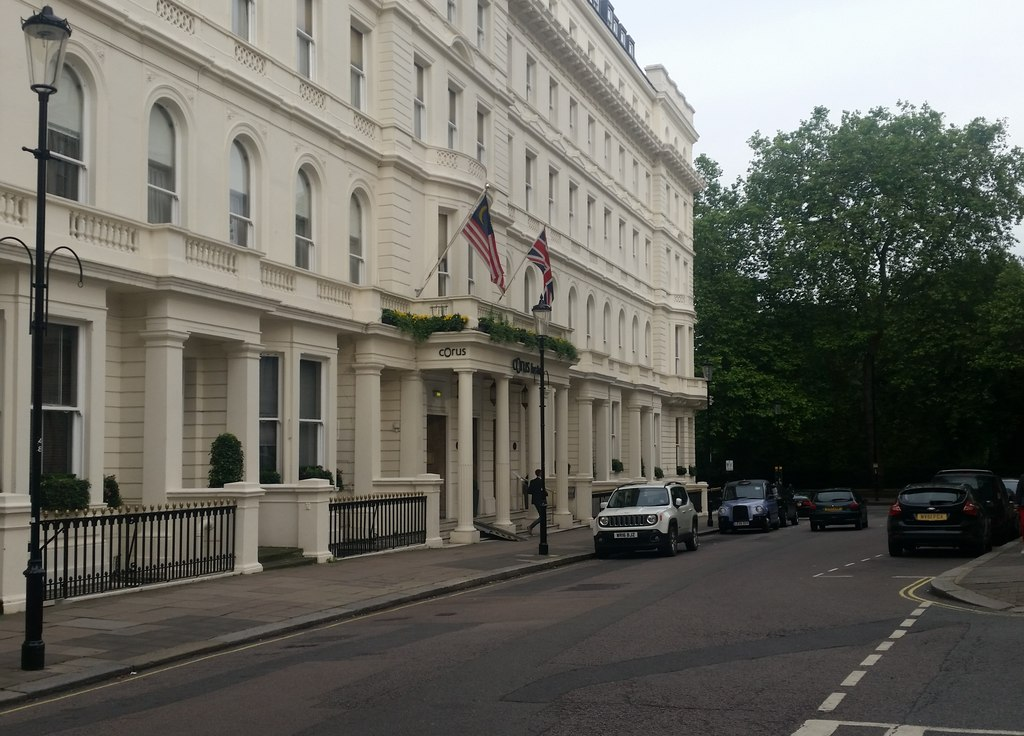
Corus Hyde Park London, Lancaster Gate.

In 2003, Corus launched a chef training school, and later, a Reception School.

In 2010, Corus Hotels found itself in the national newspapers for retiring maitre d' Elena Salvoni, on the same day that the Government announced plans to scrap the default retirement age. Ms Salvoni was 90 years old.

== Hotels ==
- Corus Hotel Hyde Park, London
- Burnham Beeches Hotel, Burnham, Buckinghamshire
- The Iliffe Hotel, Coventry closed
- St. James' Hotel, Grimsby
- Corus Hotel Kuala Lumpur, Kuala Lumpur
- Corus Paradise Resort Port Dickson, Port Dickson
