= Bernard Ashley (businessman) =

English businessperson and engineer (1926–2009)

Sir Bernard Ashley
- Born: Bernard Albert Ashley; 11 August 1926; Brixton, London, England
- Died: 14 February 2009 (aged 82); Elan Valley, Rhayader, Wales
- Resting place: St. John the Baptist Church, Carno, Powys
- Education: Whitgift School
- Occupations: Engineer, fashion designer, businessman
- Years active: 1953–2009
- Known for: Fashion design
- Title: Knight Bachelor (1987)
- Spouses: Laura Mountney (m. 1949; died 1985) Regine Burnell (m. 1990)
- Children: 4
- Website: elanbach.com

Sir Bernard Albert Ashley (11 August 1926 – 14 February 2009) was an English businessman and engineer. He was the husband of Laura Ashley, and was her business partner from the founding of their fashion-textiles-centred business.

An engineer with a love of trains, planes and boats, Ashley was often portrayed in the media as a businessman instead of a designer – but he had a huge love of colour and design.

He had interests in Laura Ashley Holdings and the country-house hotel Llangoed Hall. Ranked 796th richest person in the UK with a fortune of £60m in fashion and hotels by the Sunday Times Rich List. He lived mainly in Brussels, but had houses in Hay-on-Wye and France.

== Early life ==
Ashley was born 11 August 1926, the son of Albert Ashley and Hilda Maud Ashley. He attended Whitgift Middle School in Croydon. He served with the Brigade of Gurkhas in India after World War II.

== Laura Ashley plc ==
After World War II, engineer Bernard Ashley met Welsh secretary Laura Mountney at a youth club in Wallington, London. While working as a secretary and raising her first two children, part-time she designed napkins, table mats, tea-towels which Bernard printed on a machine he had designed in an attic flat in Pimlico, London. The couple had invested £10 in wood for the screen frame, dyes and a few yards of linen.

From 1953, Bernard left his city job and the couple began to expand the company. This put themselves on the road to becoming an international company with a brand that is recognised around the globe. Laura designed the prints and Bernard built the printing equipment, so forging a complementary partnership that was to give the company its unique strength throughout the years. Laura remained in charge of design until shortly before her death, while Bernard handled the operational side.

Employing staff to cope with the growth of sales, the company was originally registered as Ashley Mountney (Laura's maiden name), but Bernard changed the name to Laura Ashley because he felt a woman's name was more appropriate for the type of products.

The newly formed company moved to Kent in 1955, but the business was nearly wiped out in 1958, when the River Darent overflowed – leaving equipment, dyes and fabrics floating in three feet of water. Turnover rose from £2,000 to £8,000 in 1960, and in light of the birth of the third of their four children, the family moved to Wales in 1961. Originally located in the social club in Carno, Montgomeryshire, in 1967 the factory moved across to the village's railway station.

These were crucial times in the development of the company – Bernard had developed his flat-bed printing process to produce 5,000 metres of fabric per week, and in 1966 Laura produced her first dress for social rather than work attire. By 1970, sales had reached £300,000 per year, and in one week alone, London's Fulham Road shop sold 4,000 dresses – which resulted in the new factory in Newtown, Montgomeryshire. It was the opening of the Paris shop in 1974 which was the first to feature the distinctive green frontage and stripped wooden interior; and, in the same year, the first USA shop opened in San Francisco. A licensing operation led to the opening of department store concessions in Australia, Canada and Japan from 1971 onwards. By 1975, turnover was £5million per year and the company employed a thousand people worldwide. Laura turned down the offer of an OBE (she was upset Bernard had not been offered one) but a Queen's Award for Export was accepted in 1977.

Two months after Laura's death in 1985, Laura Ashley Holdings plc went public in a flotation that was 34 times oversubscribed. Bernard Ashley was knighted in 1987.

However, by the end of the 1980s Laura Ashley was distinctly out of fashion. Women were making inroads in the boardroom, and sharp suits and shoulder pads were at odds with everything Laura Ashley stood for. Sir Bernard's larger-than-life personality and idiosyncratic style of management meant that he fell out of favour with the City. The first of a new group of CEO's was employed, in James Maxmin, who rationalised the production and distribution system – that until then, replaced a legacy system that would route, for example, a T-shirt manufactured in Hong Kong to a warehouse in Newtown, Wales, before sending it to a retail store in Japan. In 1992, Dr Maxmin led Laura Ashley to its first gross profits since 1989, and in fiscal 1993, gross profits were expected to reach 12 million pounds. But in early April 1994, Dr Maxmin abruptly resigned from Laura Ashley, citing major differences over strategy with Sir Bernard.

Laura Ashley celebrated its 40th anniversary in 1993, the same year that Sir Bernard retired as chairperson and became honorary life president.

== Elanbach ==
In 2000, Sir Bernard set up a new textile company named Elanbach and requested that daughter Emma Shuckburgh (née Ashley) act as its creative director. Named after Emma's home in the Elan Valley near Rhayader, it is based at Sir Bernard's five-star hotel, Llangoed Hall, near Brecon, and was to be sold in shops in London and Paris.

Emma admitted to the BBC that she was surprised to be asked by her father: It's very exciting. It's a realisation of a dream. I kept thinking my father would say "I have changed my mind. I was joking." He hasn't said no to anything, so it's all going in the shops. Having grown up watching her mother design, Emma says the job simply comes naturally to her: I did my first dress design for Laura Ashley when I was 14, I was complaining there was nothing I could wear. She said, "right, just design some stuff then." I don't feel I have to live up to some great thing at all.

The company launched its first shop in Hay-on-Wye in 2001, and included designs from Emma's daughter, Rose.

== Ashley houses ==
Sir Bernard Ashley bought Llangoed Hall, seeing it as the place where he could fulfill his ambition to recreate the atmosphere of an Edwardian house party. He later replicated this in other locations, but sold the two American properties in 1999 to Orient-Express Hotels, renamed as Belmond Ltd. in 2014.

- Keswick Hall – in Charlottesville, Virginia – sold in 1999 to Orient-Express Hotels.
- Llangoed Hall – near Brecon, Powys. Purchased 1987, now a hotel and the base for Elanbach.
- Inn at Perry Cabin hotel, in Talbot County, Maryland – sold in 1999 to Orient-Express Hotels.

== Personal life ==
Laura and Sir Bernard were married from 1949 until her death in 1985. Laura had four children, the expansion of the business meant the need for an escape point, and for creativity. They bought a house in France in the early 1970s, and kept in touch with the family and business through flying, with Sir Bernard's accomplished skills as a pilot.

The Ashley children were all involved in the business. David (born 1954/55), the eldest son, designed and opened 182 shops across America, daughter Jane was the company photographer; youngest daughter Emma designed textiles and their second son, Nick, was design director for Laura Ashley during its successful flotation in 1985. Nick went on to launch his own brand Nick Ashley, an exclusive menswear range, with a shop in Notting Hill and outlets throughout Japan.

Sir Bernard Ashley served as chairman of Laura Ashley, while Laura Ashley oversaw the company's fabric design. The company's commercial success enabled the couple to acquire considerable assets, including a yacht, a private aircraft, a French chateau in Picardy, a town-house in Brussels, and the villa Contenta in Lyford Cay, New Providence, Bahamas, which in 2006 was offered for sale at $8.5million.

In 1985, on her 60th birthday, while she was visiting her children in the UK, Laura fell down the stairs and was rushed to hospital where she died ten days later. Her name lives on through her business. She is buried in the churchyard of St John the Baptist, in Carno, Powys, Wales.

In 1990, he married Regine Burnell. He died of cancer on 14 February 2009 and is buried with Laura.
