= Boulogne agreement =

14th century proclamation on the rights of the Crown and the king's honor

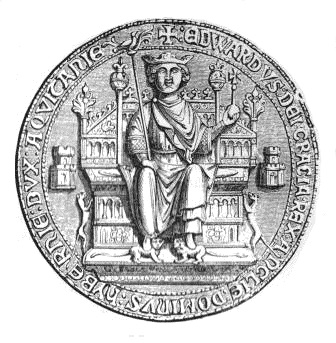
Seal of Edward II

The Boulogne agreement was a document signed by a group of English magnates in 1308, concerning the government of Edward II. After the death of Edward I in 1307, discontent soon developed against the new king. This was partly due to lingering problems from the previous reign, but also related to issues with Edward II himself. Particularly his abandonment of the Scottish Wars and his patronage of the unpopular Piers Gaveston caused discontent. Drawn up in Boulogne-sur-Mer during the king's nuptials, the document vaguely asserted the signatories' duty to guard the rights of the Crown. Three months later, the agreement was the basis for another document, justifying opposition to the king. This latter document, the so-called Declaration of 1308, is notable for its use of the "doctrine of capacities": the distinction between the person of the King and the institution of the Crown.

The document today exists only in a 17th-century transcript by the antiquarian William Dugdale. The Boulogne agreement was largely unknown to modern historians up until the 1960s, but it is now considered significant because it is the first documented expression of the conflict between king and nobility, which was to dominate so much of the reign of Edward II. Though historians agree on the document's importance, there is still disagreement over its interpretation, particularly whether the signatories should be seen as oppositional or loyal to the king.

== Background ==
Edward II succeeded as king of England on 7 July 1307, on the death of his father Edward I. The expectations of the new king were high, and he initially enjoyed a good relationship with the leading magnates of the realm. There were, however, some issues of contention remaining from the reign of his father. Edward I's incessant wars had put a great fiscal burden on the country, and his confrontational style had led to conflict with some of the leading lay and ecclesiastical lords. This had culminated in the drafting of the so-called Remonstrances in 1297, a set of complaints about royal government. By Edward I's death in 1307, most of these issued had been resolved. It was nevertheless in the interest of the leading men of the country to make sure that the new king did not act the way his father had, and ignored the opinions of his councillors.

There were also certain personal issues regarding the new king that caused concern. Shortly before his death, Edward I had exiled Prince Edward's favourite and possible lover Piers Gaveston, whom the king believed had too much influence over the prince. At his deathbed he had supposedly exhorted some of his closest followers – Henry de Lacy, Earl of Lincoln, Guy de Beauchamp, Earl of Warwick, Aymer de Valence, Earl of Pembroke and Robert Clifford – to keep watch over his son, and particularly to make sure that Gaveston did not return. One of Edward II's first actions as king was nevertheless to recall Gaveston from exile. He also gave him the title of Earl of Cornwall – a title normally reserved for members of the royal family – thereby furthering the aggravation against the favourite. Another source of discontent was Edward II abandoning the Scottish Wars pursued by his father. This left the way open for Robert the Bruce to regain land the English had conquered, to the detriment of many English magnates.

On 22 January 1308, Edward II left England for France, leaving Gaveston behind as Regent. By the Treaty of Montreuil in 1299, it had been agreed that Edward should marry Isabella, the daughter of Philippe IV of France. Accompanying the king were several great nobles, including Lincoln, Pembroke, Clifford, John de Warenne, Earl of Surrey and Humphrey de Bohun, Earl of Hereford. On 25 January Edward and Isabella were married at Boulogne-sur-Mer, and on 31 January Edward performed homage for the Duchy of Aquitaine, which the English king held of the French king. On that same day, the nobles mentioned above, with others, gathered to sign the document that has become known to history as the Boulogne agreement.

== Document and interpretation ==
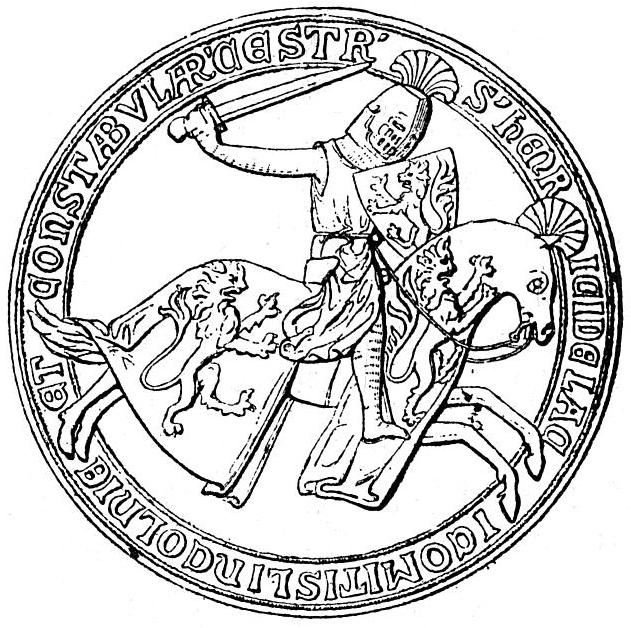
Henry de Lacy, Earl of Lincoln, was the oldest and most respected among the earls of Edward II.

The document was signed and dated at Boulogne on the 31 January 1308. At the top of the list of signatories was Antony Bek, Bishop of Durham and Patriarch of Jerusalem. He was followed by the four earls Lincoln, Pembroke, Surrey and Hereford, and five men of baronial families: Clifford, Payn Tybetot, Henry de Gray, John de Botetourt and John de Berwick. The document today exists in the Bodleian Library in Oxford, as a transcript made by the 17th-century antiquarian William Dugdale. Dugdale's transcript is believed to be based on an older document, which was probably lost in the Cotton library fire of 1731.

The text of the document is rather vague and noncommittal. The signatories were concerned with guarding the king's honour and the rights of the Crown (garder son honeur et les dreits de sa Corounne). There was also a promise to address and correct both the things that had been done against that honour and those rights, as well as the past and present oppression of the people (les choses que sont feites avant ces houres countre soen honour et le droit de sa Coronne, et les oppressiouns que ount estre feit et uncore se fount de jour en jour a soen people). Nothing is said about what specifically these things were, but it must be assumed that the target was Gaveston. Bek was given the authority to excommunicate whoever broke the terms of the agreement.

Because of the vague language of the document, there has been much scholarly debate over how it should be interpreted. John Maddicott saw the wording as a hostile warning to the new king to avoid the mistakes of his father, or face the consequences. J. R. S. Phillips, on the other hand, took the signatories to be positively inclined towards Edward II. There were others who were more intrinsic in their opposition to the king and Gaveston, primarily the Earl of Warwick. The purpose of the document, in Phillips view, was to present the king with a warning, and hopefully protect him against the more antagonistic members of the nobility.

== Aftermath and transmission ==
The Boulogne agreement had little immediate impact, and is notable mostly for its influence on a later document presented in parliament in April that year. In the meanwhile, on 25 February, the king had been crowned. Before the coronation, the king had been forced to include an additional clause in his coronation oath. The king obliged himself to abide by the law, but this exact meaning of this promise was ambiguous. The clause referred to laws the people "shall have chosen" (aura eslu), which left it unclear whether it also included future enactments. At the coronation ceremony that followed, Gaveston acted with such presumption and arrogance as to further alienate the leading magnates.

The document from the April parliament, today referred to as the Declaration of 1308, contained three articles and was presented by the Earl of Lincoln. The first article invoked the so-called "doctrine of capacities": that the subjects of the realm owed allegiance to the institution of the Crown, not to the person of the King. If the King abused his position, it was his subject's duty to correct this, thereby upholding the pledge of the Boulogne agreement to protect the rights of the Crown. The second article was an attack on Gaveston – though he was not mentioned by name – implicitly demanding his renewed exile. The third article referred to the additional clause from the coronation oath. It was here taken to mean that the king had obliged himself to abide by any decisions made by his subjects; past, present or future. The king initially held out against the opposition, but the earls also received support from Philippe IV, who was offended by Edward's apparent preference of Gaveston over Isabella. On 18 May Edward agreed to once again send Gaveston into exile.

Dugdale both transcribed the Boulogne agreement and made a reference to it, in a footnote in his 1675 Baronage of England. After this the document was absent from history writing for almost three centuries. Dugdale's footnote was mentioned by certain historians, but it was not until 1965 that the document itself was again used as a source, when Noël Denholm-Young quoted a few lines from it in his History and Heraldry: 1254–1310. In 1972, J. R. S. Phillips printed a complete transcription of the Boulogne agreement in his book Aymer de Valence, Earl of Pembroke 1307–1324.

== See also ==
- Ordinances of 1311
- Royal prerogative
