= Doctrine of capacities =

English legal theory

The doctrine of capacities is a concept in political theory of medieval England which asserts a distinction between the person of the King and the institution of the Crown. The roots of this political theory can be traced back to the years shortly after the Norman Conquest. Here the distinction was made between the ecclesiastics in their temporal and spiritual capacities. When William the Conqueror brought a case against his brother Odo of Bayeux, Odo defended himself by claiming that as a bishop he could not be prosecuted by lay authorities. William replied that he was not being prosecuted in his capacity as bishop, but in his temporal capacity as Earl of Kent. In the reign of Edward I, the principle was applied to the chancellor, to distinguish between his official capacities. Even more significantly, Edward I himself tied the doctrine to the institution of the monarchy, when he tried to revoke a grant he had made as prince after he became king, claiming that he was to be considered a different person then.

In April 1308, in a document presented in parliament, certain barons used the doctrine of capacities to justify opposition against King Edward II. The specific case revolved around King Edward's favourite Piers Gaveston, whom the opposition wanted exiled. This Declaration of 1308 argued that it was the subjects' duty to protect the dignity of the Crown, even if that meant opposition to the King – an act that would normally signify treason. In 1321, however, the opposition against Edward II took the opposite position when they accused Hugh Despenser the Younger of his participation in the Declaration of 1308. By this accusation the doctrine was largely discredited, and rarely used again in the medieval period.

== See also ==
- Right of revolution
- Royal prerogative
- Ordinances of 1311

== Sources ==
- Chrimes, S. B. (1936). English Constitutional Ideas in the Fifteenth Century. Cambridge: Cambridge University Press.
- Davies, James Conway (1967) [1918]. The Baronial Opposition to Edward II: Its Character and Policy, a Study in Administrative History. London: Cass.
- Maddicot, J.R. (1970). Thomas of Lancaster, 1307–1322. Oxford: Oxford University Press. ISBN 0-19-821837-0. OCLC 132766.
- Maitland, Frederic William; Pollock, Frederick (1996) [1898]. The History of English Law Before the Time of Edward I. Cambridge: Cambridge University Press. ISBN 1-886363-22-6.
- Valente, Claire (2003). The Theory and Practice of Revolt in Medieval England. Ashgate: Aldershot. ISBN 0-7546-0901-4.
