= Edward II =

King of England from 1307 to 1327

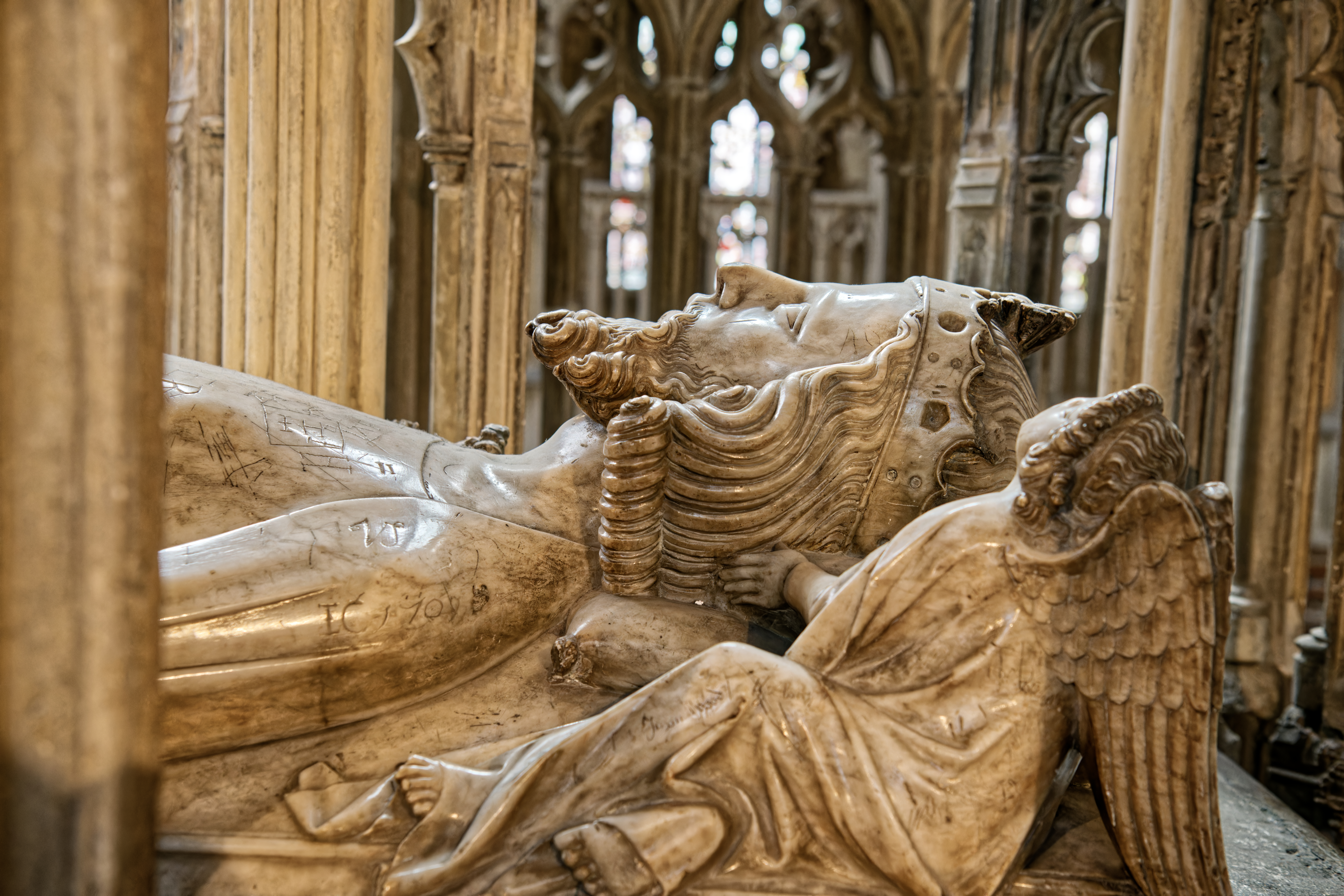
- Tomb effigy, Gloucester Cathedral

King of England
- Reign: 7 July 1307 – 21 January 1327
- Coronation: 25 February 1308
- Predecessor: Edward I
- Successor: Edward III
- Born: 25 April 1284; Caernarfon Castle, Gwynedd, Wales
- Died: 21 September 1327 (aged 43); Berkeley Castle, Gloucestershire, England
- Burial: 20 December 1327; Gloucester Cathedral, Gloucestershire, England
- Spouse: Isabella of France (m. 1308)
- Issue Detail: Edward III of England; John, Earl of Cornwall; Eleanor, Duchess of Guelders; Joan, Queen of Scots; Adam FitzRoy (ill.)
- House: Plantagenet
- Father: Edward I of England
- Mother: Eleanor of Castile

Edward II (25 April 1284 – 21 September 1327), also known as Edward of Caernarfon or Caernarvon, was King of England from 1307 until he was deposed in January 1327. The fourth son of Edward I, Edward became the heir to the throne following the death of his older brother Alphonso. Beginning in 1300, Edward accompanied his father on campaigns in Scotland, and in 1306 he was knighted in a grand ceremony at Westminster Abbey. Edward succeeded to the throne the next year, following his father's death. In 1308, he married Isabella, daughter of the powerful King Philip IV of France, as part of a long-running effort to resolve the tensions between the English and French crowns.

Edward had a close and controversial relationship with Piers Gaveston, who had joined his household in 1300. The precise nature of Edward and Gaveston's relationship is uncertain; they may have been friends, lovers, or sworn brothers. Gaveston's arrogance and power as Edward's favourite provoked discontent both among the barons and the French royal family, and Edward was forced to exile him. On Gaveston's return, the barons pressured the King into agreeing to wide-ranging reforms called the Ordinances of 1311. The newly empowered barons banished Gaveston, to which Edward responded by revoking the reforms and recalling his favourite. Led by Edward's cousin Thomas, 2nd Earl of Lancaster, a group of the barons seized and executed Gaveston in 1312, beginning several years of armed confrontation. English forces were pushed back in Scotland, where Edward was decisively defeated by Robert the Bruce at the Battle of Bannockburn in 1314. Widespread famine followed, and criticism of the King's reign mounted.

The Despenser family, in particular Hugh Despenser the Younger, became close friends and advisers to Edward, but in 1321 Lancaster and many of the barons seized the Despensers' lands and forced the King to exile them. In response, Edward led a short military campaign, capturing and executing Lancaster. Edward and the Despensers strengthened their grip on power, revoking the 1311 reforms, executing their enemies and confiscating estates. Unable to make progress in Scotland, Edward finally signed a truce with Robert. Opposition to the regime grew, and when Isabella was sent to France to negotiate a peace treaty in 1325, she turned against Edward and refused to return. Isabella allied herself with the exiled Roger Mortimer, and invaded England with a small army in 1326. Edward's regime collapsed and he fled into Wales, where he was captured in November. Edward was forced to relinquish his crown in January 1327 in favour of his son, Edward III of England, and he died in Berkeley Castle on 21 September, probably murdered on the orders of the new regime.

Edward's relationship with Gaveston inspired Christopher Marlowe's 1592 play Edward II, along with other plays, films, novels and media. Many of these have focused on the possible sexual relationship between the two men. Edward's contemporaries criticised his performance as a king, noting his failures in Scotland and the oppressive regime of his later years, although 19th-century academics have argued that the growth of parliamentary institutions during his reign was a positive development for England over the longer term. Debate has continued into the 21st century as to whether Edward was a lazy and incompetent king, or simply a reluctant and ultimately unsuccessful ruler.

== Background ==
Edward II was the fourth son of Edward I, King of England, Lord of Ireland, and ruler of Gascony in south-western France (which he held as the feudal vassal of the King of France), and Eleanor, Countess of Ponthieu in northern France. Eleanor was from the Castilian royal family. Edward I proved a successful military leader, leading the suppression of the baronial revolts in the 1260s and joining the Ninth Crusade. During the 1280s he conquered North Wales, removing the native Welsh princes from power and, in the 1290s, he intervened in Scotland's civil war, claiming suzerainty over the country. He was considered an extremely successful ruler by his contemporaries, largely able to control the powerful earls that formed the senior ranks of the English nobility. The historian Michael Prestwich describes Edward I as "a king to inspire fear and respect", while John Gillingham characterises him as an "efficient bully".

Despite Edward I's successes, when he died in 1307 he left a range of challenges for his son to resolve. One of the most critical was the problem of English rule in Scotland, where Edward I's long but ultimately inconclusive military campaign was ongoing when he died. His control of Gascony created tension with the French kings. They insisted that the English kings give homage to them for the lands; the English kings saw this demand as insulting to their honour, and the issue remained unresolved. Edward I also faced increasing opposition from his barons over the taxation and requisitions required to resource his wars, and left his son debts of around £200,000 on his death. (Note: It is impossible to accurately convert sums of medieval money into modern incomes and prices. For comparison, it cost Edward's father, Edward I, around £15,000 to build the castle and town walls of Conwy, while the annual income of a 14th-century nobleman such as Richard le Scrope, 1st Baron Scrope of Bolton, was around £600 a year.)

== Early life (1284–1307) ==
=== Birth ===
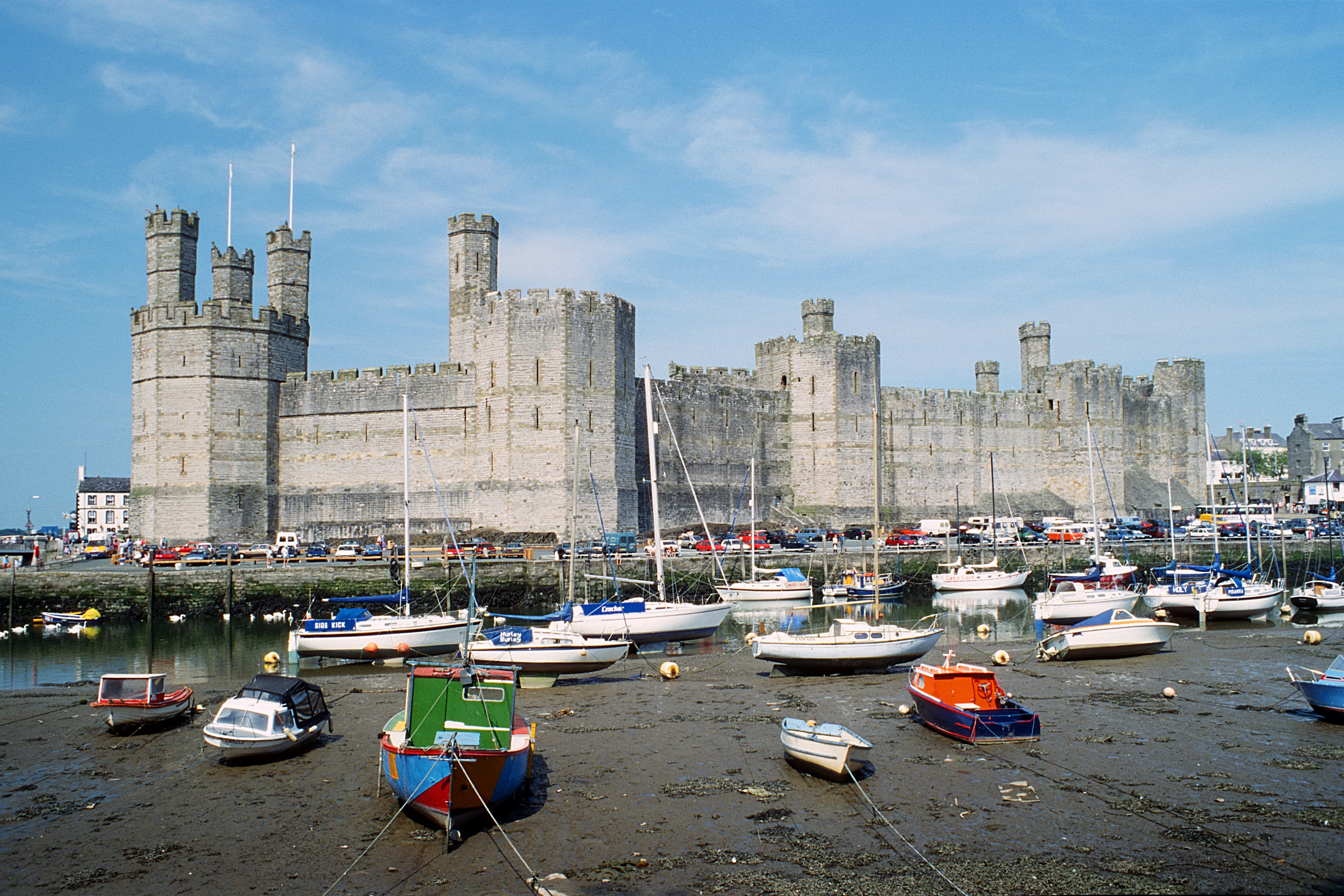
Caernarfon Castle in north Wales, Edward's birthplace

Edward II was born in Caernarfon Castle in north Wales on 25 April 1284, less than a year after Edward I had conquered the region, and as a result is sometimes called Edward of Caernarfon. The King probably chose the castle deliberately as the location for Edward's birth as it was an important symbolic location for the native Welsh, associated with Roman imperial history, and it formed the centre of the new royal administration of North Wales. Edward's birth brought predictions of greatness from contemporary prophets, who believed that the Last Days of the world were imminent, declaring him a new King Arthur, who would lead England to glory. David Powel, a 16th-century clergyman, suggested that the baby was offered to the Welsh as a prince "that was borne in Wales and could speake never a word of English", but there is no evidence to support this account.

Edward's name was English in origin, linking him to the Anglo-Saxon saint Edward the Confessor, and was chosen by his father instead of the more traditional Norman and Castilian names selected for Edward's brothers: John and Henry, who had died before Edward was born, and Alphonso, who died in August 1284, leaving Edward as the heir to the throne. Although Edward was a relatively healthy child, there were enduring concerns throughout his early years that he too might die and leave his father without a male heir. After his birth, Edward was looked after by a wet nurse called Mariota or Mary Maunsel for a few months until she fell ill, when Alice de Leygrave became his foster mother. He would have barely known his natural mother, Eleanor, who was in Gascony with his father during his earliest years. An official household, complete with staff, was created for the new baby, under the direction of a clerk, Giles of Oudenarde.

=== Childhood, personality and appearance ===
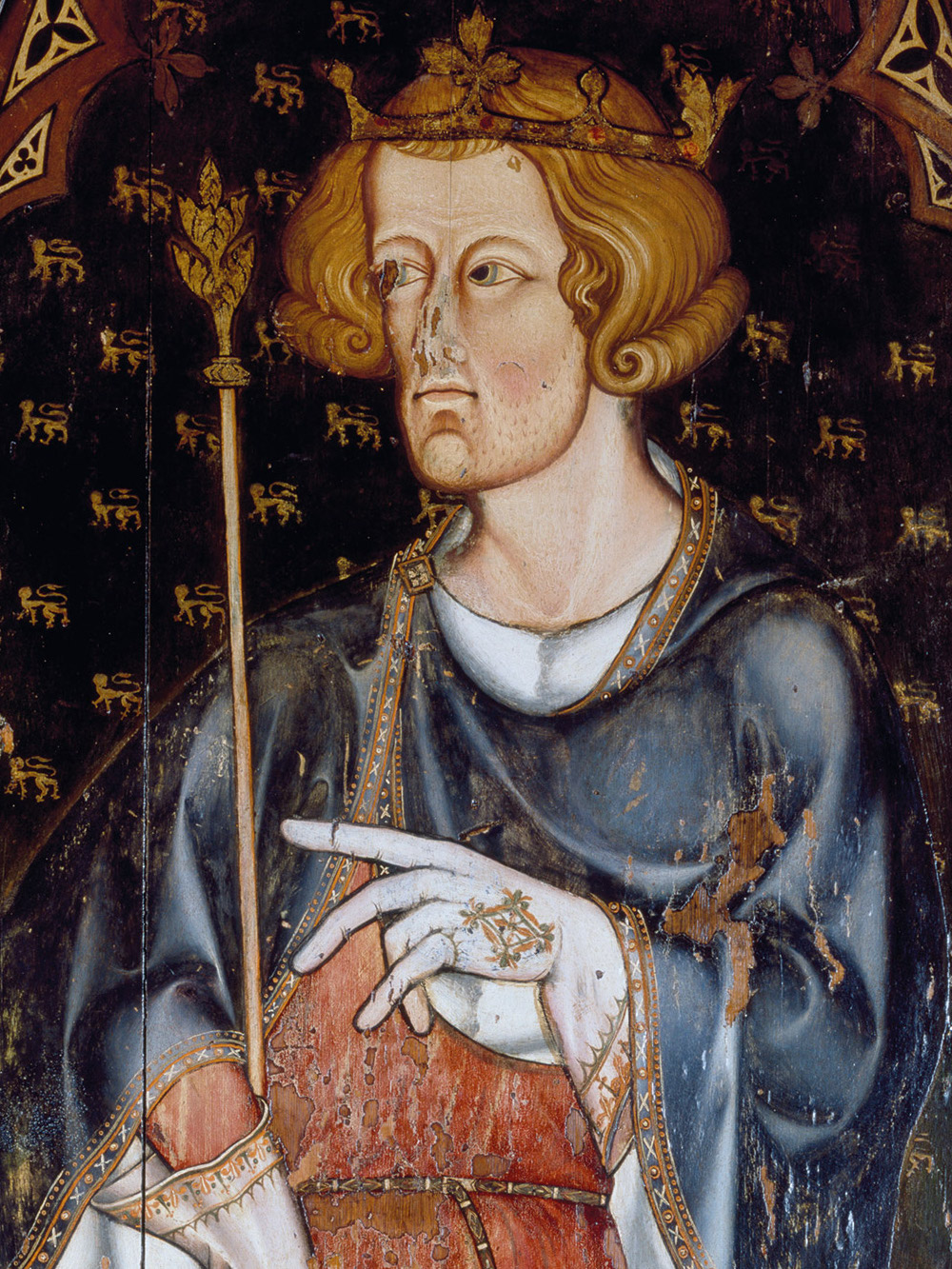
Portrait in Westminster Abbey, thought to be of Edward's father, Edward I

Spending increased on Edward's personal household as he grew older and, in 1293, William of Blyborough took over as its administrator. Edward was probably given a religious education by the Dominican friars, whom his mother invited into his household in 1290. He was assigned one of his grandmother's followers, Guy Ferre, as his magister, who was responsible for his discipline, training him in riding and military skills. It is uncertain how well educated Edward was; there is little evidence for his ability to read and write, although his mother was keen that her other children be well educated, and Ferre was himself a relatively learned man for the period. (Note: Earlier histories of Edward II considered him poorly educated, principally because he took his coronation oath in French, rather than Latin, and because of his interest in agricultural crafts. His use of French at his coronation is no longer interpreted in this fashion, but there is little other evidence to show to what extent Edward was educated. The links drawn between an interest in crafts and low intelligence are no longer considered accurate.) Edward likely mainly spoke Anglo-Norman French in his daily life, in addition to some English and possibly Latin. (Note: The historian Seymour Phillips considers it probable that Edward possessed some Latin; Roy Haines is less convinced.)

Edward had a normal upbringing for a member of a royal family. (Note: Earlier historical accounts of Edward have suggested that his childhood was marred by a lack of contact with his family and an absence of familial affection, influencing his later personality and problems; although Edward's father, Edward I, is still considered an "irascible and demanding" figure, his childhood is no longer thought unusual for the period, or particularly isolated.) He was interested in horses and horsebreeding, and became a good rider; he also liked dogs, in particular greyhounds. In his letters, he shows a quirky sense of humour, joking about sending unsatisfactory animals to his friends, such as horses who disliked carrying their riders, or lazy hunting dogs too slow to catch rabbits. He was not particularly interested in hunting or falconry, both popular activities in the 14th century. He enjoyed music, including Welsh music and the newly invented crwth instrument, as well as musical organs. He did not take part in jousting, either because he lacked the aptitude or because he had been banned from participating for his personal safety, but he was certainly enthusiastic in his support of the sport.

Edward grew up to be tall and muscular, and was considered good-looking by the standards of the period. He had a reputation as a competent public speaker and was known for his generosity to household staff. Unusually, he enjoyed rowing, as well as hedging and ditching, and enjoyed associating with labourers and other lower-class workers. (Note: The historian Seymour Phillips notes, however, that there is relatively little hard evidence to support the statements made by contemporaries about Edward's enjoyment of rural pastimes.) This behaviour was not considered normal for the nobility of the period and attracted criticism from contemporaries.

In 1290, Edward's father had confirmed the Treaty of Birgham, in which he promised to marry his six-year-old son to the young Margaret of Norway, who had a potential claim to the crown of Scotland. Margaret died later that year, bringing an end to the plan. Edward's mother, Eleanor, died shortly afterwards, followed by his grandmother, Eleanor of Provence. Edward I was distraught at his wife's death and held a huge funeral for her; his son inherited the County of Ponthieu from Eleanor. Next, a French marriage was considered for the young Edward, to help secure a lasting peace with France. As part of the arrangement, Edward I offered fortresses in Gascony but King Philip IV, who occupied the fortresses, refused to release them, provoking the Gascon War in 1294. The idea was replaced with the proposal of a marriage to a daughter of the rebellious Guy, Count of Flanders, but this too failed after King Philip was able to have the proposed bride sent to Paris.

=== Early campaigns in Scotland ===
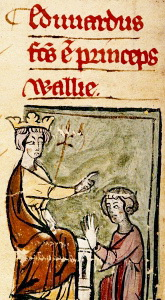
Early 14th-century depiction of Edward I (left) declaring his son Edward (right) the Prince of Wales

Between 1297 and 1298, Edward was left as regent in charge of England while the King campaigned in Flanders against Philip IV, who had occupied part of the English king's lands in Gascony. On his return, Edward I signed a peace treaty, under which he took Philip's sister Margaret as his wife and agreed that Prince Edward would in due course marry Philip's daughter, Isabella, who was then only two years old. In theory, this marriage would mean that the disputed Duchy of Gascony would be inherited by a descendant of both Edward and Philip, providing a possible end to the long-running tensions. The young Edward seems to have got on well with his new stepmother, who gave birth to two sons, Thomas of Brotherton in 1300 and Edmund of Woodstock in 1301. As king, Edward later provided his half-brothers with financial support and titles. (Note: Edward II faced criticism from contemporaries for favouring Gaveston above his half-brothers, although detailed research by Alison Marshall shows more generosity, Marshall arguing that "for once", Edward was criticised unfairly.)

Edward I returned to Scotland once again in 1300, and this time took his son with him, making him the commander of the rearguard at the siege of Caerlaverock Castle. In the spring of 1301, the King declared Edward the Prince of Wales, granting him the earldom of Chester and lands across North Wales; he seems to have hoped that this would help pacify the region, and that it would give his son some financial independence. Edward received homage from his Welsh subjects and then joined his father for the 1301 Scottish campaign; he took an army of around 300 soldiers north with him and captured Turnberry Castle. Prince Edward also took part in the 1303 campaign during which he besieged Brechin Castle, deploying his own siege engine in the operation. In the spring of 1304, Edward conducted negotiations with the rebel Scottish leaders on the King's behalf and, when these failed, he joined his father for the siege of Stirling Castle.

In 1305, Edward and his father quarrelled, probably over the issue of money. The prince had an altercation with Bishop Walter Langton, who served as the royal treasurer, apparently over the amount of financial support Edward received from the Crown. The King defended his treasurer, and banished Prince Edward and his companions from his court, cutting off their financial support. After some negotiations involving family members and friends, father and son were reconciled.

The Scottish conflict flared up once again in 1306, when Robert the Bruce killed his rival John Comyn III of Badenoch and declared himself King of the Scots. Edward I mobilised a fresh army, but decided that, this time, his son would be formally in charge of the expedition. Prince Edward was made the duke of Aquitaine and then, along with many other young men, he was knighted in a lavish ceremony at Westminster Abbey called the Feast of the Swans. Amid a huge feast in the neighbouring hall, reminiscent of Arthurian legends and crusading events, the assembly took a collective oath to defeat Bruce. It is unclear what role Prince Edward's forces played in the campaign that summer, which, under the orders of Edward I, saw a punitive, brutal retaliation against Bruce's faction in Scotland. (Note: The English 1306 campaign in Scotland was brutal, and the chronicler William Rishanger held Prince Edward responsible for savage attacks on the local population; the historian Seymour Phillips has noted that many of Rishanger's other details are incorrect, and casts doubt on the chronicle's more extreme statements.) Edward returned to England in September, where diplomatic negotiations to finalise a date for his wedding to Isabella continued.

=== Piers Gaveston and sexuality ===
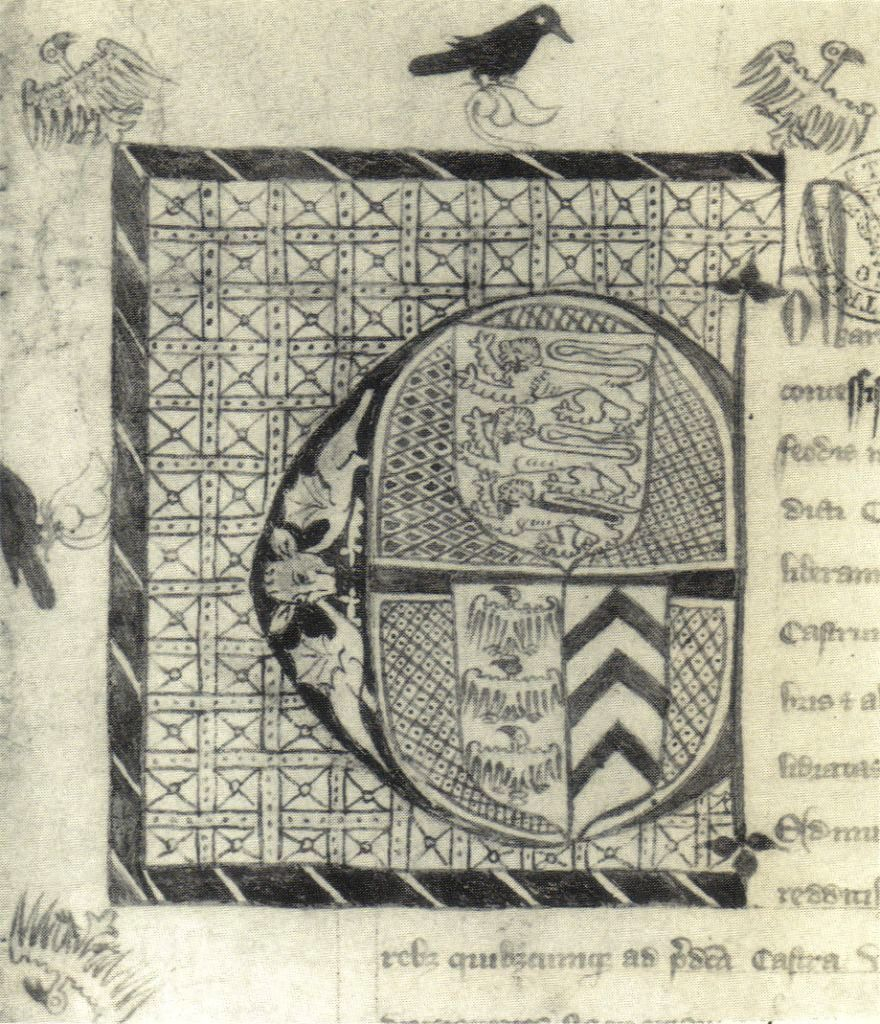
Initial from the charter granting Piers Gaveston the earldom of Cornwall

During this time, Edward became close to Piers Gaveston. Gaveston was the son of one of the King's household knights whose lands lay adjacent to Gascony, and had himself joined Prince Edward's household in 1300, possibly on Edward I's instruction. The two got on well; Gaveston became a squire and was soon being referred to as a close companion of Edward, before being knighted by the King during the Feast of the Swans in 1306. The King then exiled Gaveston to Gascony in 1307 for reasons that remain unclear. According to one chronicler, Edward had asked his father to allow him to give Gaveston the County of Ponthieu, and the King responded furiously, pulling his son's hair out in great handfuls, before exiling Gaveston. The official court records, however, show Gaveston being only temporarily exiled, supported by a comfortable stipend; no reason is given for the order, suggesting that it may have been an act aimed at punishing the prince.

The possibility that Edward had a sexual relationship with Gaveston or his later favourites has been extensively discussed by historians, complicated by the scarcity of surviving evidence to determine for certain the details of their relationships. (Note: John Boswell puts forward one of the most prominent arguments in favour of Edward and Gaveston having been lovers. Jeffrey Hamilton supports that the relationship was sexual, but that it was probably not overtly so. Roy Haines is sympathetic to the argument that Edward and Gaveston had had a sexual relationship; Miri Rubin argues in favour of their being friends, with a "very intense working relationship"; Seymour Phillips believes it most likely that Edward regarded Gaveston as his adoptive brother.) Homosexuality was fiercely condemned by the Church in 14th-century England, which equated it with heresy. Both men had sexual relationships with their wives, who bore them children; Edward also had an illegitimate son, and may have had an affair with his niece, Eleanor de Clare.

The contemporary evidence supporting their homosexual relationship comes primarily from an anonymous chronicler in the 1320s who described how Edward "felt such love" for Gaveston that "he entered into a covenant of constancy, and bound himself with him before all other mortals with a bond of indissoluble love, firmly drawn up and fastened with a knot." The first specific suggestion that Edward engaged in sex with men was recorded in 1334, when Adam Orleton, the Bishop of Winchester, was accused of having stated in 1326 that Edward was a "sodomite", although Orleton defended himself by arguing that he had meant that Edward's adviser, Hugh Despenser the Younger, was a sodomite, rather than the late king. The Meaux Chronicle from the 1390s simply notes that Edward gave himself "too much to the vice of sodomy".

Alternatively, Edward and Gaveston may have simply been friends with a close working relationship. Contemporary chronicler comments are vaguely worded; Orleton's allegations were at least in part politically motivated, and are very similar to the highly politicised sodomy allegations made against Pope Boniface VIII and the Knights Templar in 1303 and 1308, respectively. Later accounts by chroniclers of Edward's activities may trace back to Orleton's original allegations, and were certainly adversely coloured by the events at the end of Edward's reign. Such historians as Michael Prestwich and Seymour Phillips have argued that the public nature of the English royal court would have made it unlikely that any homosexual affairs would have remained discreet; neither the contemporary Church, Edward's father nor his father-in-law appear to have made any adverse comments about Edward's sexual behaviour. (Note: Prestwich changed his mind about Edward's sexuality. In 1997 he wrote that Edward's relationship with Gaveston "was almost certainly of a homosexual character", and in 2003 that Edward and Gaveston had entered into a bond of adoptive brotherhood, but with a "sexual element", but in 2006 he argued that Edward was strictly heterosexual.)

A more recent theory, proposed by the historian Pierre Chaplais, suggests that Edward and Gaveston entered into a bond of adoptive brotherhood. Compacts of adoptive brotherhood, in which the participants pledged to support each other in a form of "brotherhood-in-arms", were not unknown between close male friends in the Middle Ages. Many chroniclers described Edward and Gaveston's relationship as one of brotherhood, and one explicitly noted that Edward had taken Gaveston as his adopted brother. Chaplais argues that the pair may have made a formal compact in either 1300 or 1301, and that they would have seen any later promises they made to separate or to leave each other as having been made under duress, and therefore invalid.

== Early reign (1307–1311) ==
=== Coronation and marriage ===
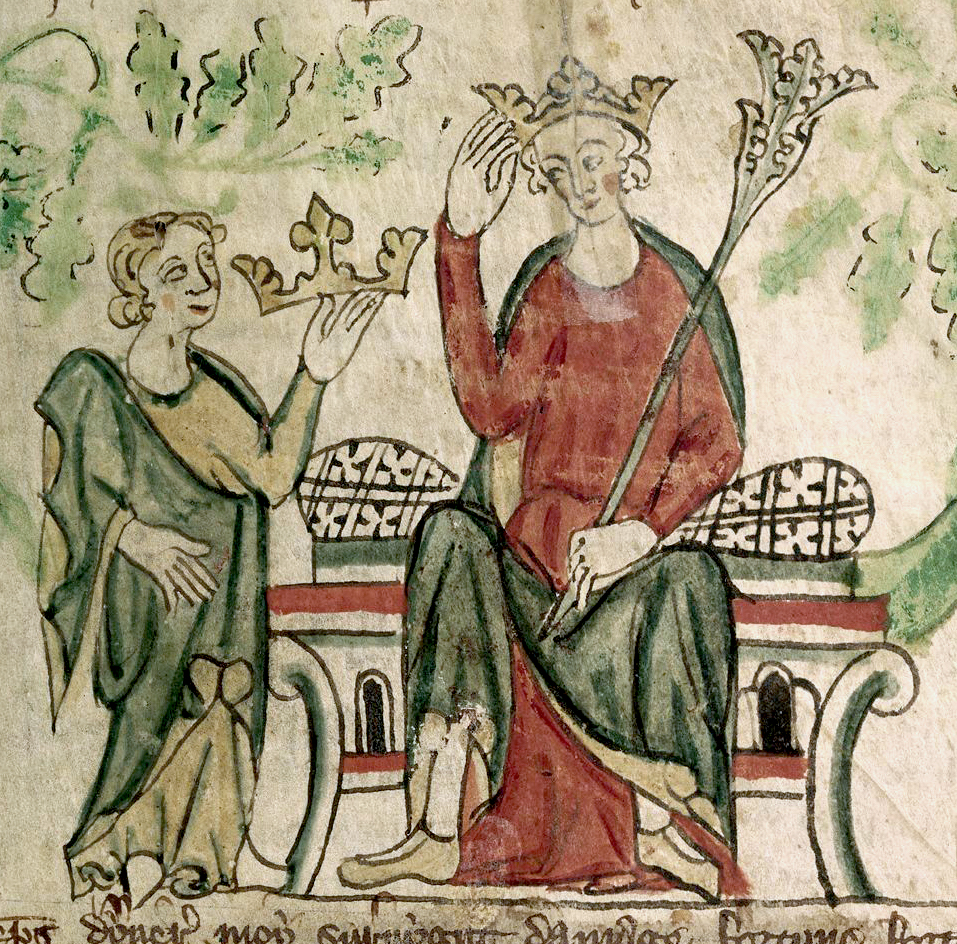
Edward II shown receiving the English crown in a contemporary illustration

Edward I mobilised another army for the Scottish campaign in 1307, which Prince Edward was due to join that summer, but the elderly king had been increasingly unwell and died on 7 July at Burgh by Sands. Edward travelled from London immediately after the news reached him, and on 20 July he was proclaimed king. He continued north into Scotland and on 4 August received homage from his Scottish supporters at Dumfries, before abandoning the campaign and returning south. Edward promptly recalled Piers Gaveston, who was then in exile, and made him Earl of Cornwall, before arranging his marriage to the wealthy Margaret de Clare. (Note: Despite Edward appointing Piers Gaveston as the Earl of Cornwall in 1307, Edward's chancery declined to recognise him as such until 1309.) Edward also arrested his old adversary Bishop Langton, and dismissed him from his post as treasurer. Edward I's body was kept at Waltham Abbey for several months before being taken for burial to Westminster, where Edward erected a simple marble tomb for his father. (Note: The story that Edward I had asked his son to swear to boil his body, bury the flesh and take bones on campaign in Scotland was a later invention.)

In 1308, Edward's marriage to Isabella of France proceeded. Edward crossed the English Channel to France in January, leaving Gaveston as his custos regni in charge of the kingdom. This arrangement was unusual, and involved unprecedented powers being delegated to Gaveston, backed by a specially engraved Great Seal. Edward probably hoped that the marriage would strengthen his position in Gascony and bring him much needed funds. The final negotiations, however, proved challenging: Edward and Philip IV did not like each other, and the French king drove a hard bargain over the size of Isabella's dower and the details of the administration of Edward's lands in France. As part of the agreement, Edward gave homage to Philip for the Duchy of Aquitaine and agreed to a commission to complete the implementation of the 1303 Treaty of Paris.

The pair were married in Boulogne on 25 January. Edward gave Isabella a psalter as a wedding gift, and her father gave her gifts worth over 21,000 livres and a fragment of the True Cross. The pair returned to England in February, where Edward had ordered Westminster Palace to be lavishly restored in readiness for their coronation and wedding feast, complete with marble tables, forty ovens and a fountain that produced wine and pimento, a spiced medieval drink. After some delays, the ceremony went ahead on 25 February at Westminster Abbey, under the guidance of Henry Woodlock, the Bishop of Winchester. As part of the coronation, Edward swore to uphold "the rightful laws and customs which the community of the realm shall have chosen". It is uncertain what this meant: It might have been intended to force Edward to accept future legislation, it may have been inserted to prevent him from overturning any future vows he might take, or it may have been an attempt by the king to ingratiate himself with the barons. (Note: It is unclear who wrote this part of the coronation oath, or what their intentions where. Historical discussions over the coronation oath have included debate over the tense of the Latin phrase aura eslau, which would change the meaning of the oath from referring to future legislation, to a retrospective statement about respecting existing laws and customs. It is also uncertain to what extent any changes in the coronation oath were driven by wider political disagreements between Edward and the barons, or were specifically focused over concerns with Gaveston's position.) The event was marred by the large crowds of eager spectators who surged into the palace, knocking down a wall and forcing Edward to flee by the back door.

Isabella was only twelve at the time of her wedding, young even by the standards of the period, and Edward probably had sexual relations with mistresses during their first few years together. During this time he fathered an illegitimate son, Adam, who was born possibly as early as 1307. Edward and Isabella's first son, the future Edward III, was born in 1312 amid great celebrations, and three more children followed: John in 1316, Eleanor in 1318 and Joan in 1321.

=== Tensions over Gaveston ===
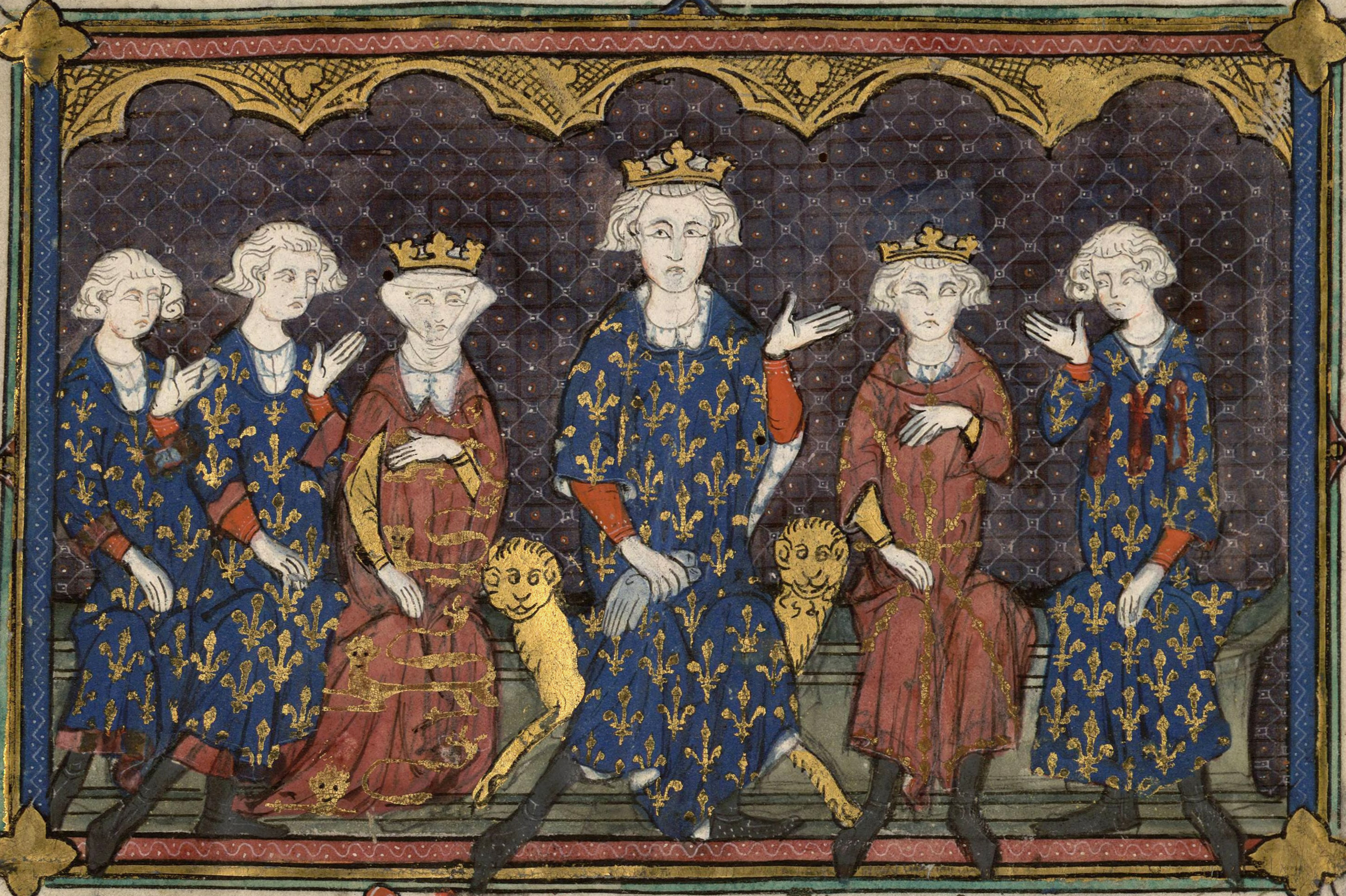
Isabella of France (third from the left) with her father, Philip IV of France (tallest), in a French manuscript

Gaveston's return from exile in 1307 was initially accepted by the barons, but opposition quickly grew. He appeared to have an excessive influence on royal policy, leading to complaints from one chronicler that there were "two kings reigning in one kingdom, the one in name and the other in deed". Accusations, probably untrue, were levelled at Gaveston that he had stolen royal funds and had purloined Isabella's wedding presents. Gaveston had played a key role at Edward's coronation, provoking fury from both the English and the French contingents about the earl's ceremonial precedence and magnificent clothes, and about Edward's apparent preference for Gaveston's company over that of Isabella at the feast.

Parliament met in February 1308 in a heated atmosphere. Edward was eager to discuss the potential for governmental reform, but the barons were unwilling to begin any such debate until the problem of Gaveston had been resolved. Violence seemed likely, but the situation was resolved through the mediation of the moderate Henry de Lacy, 3rd Earl of Lincoln, who convinced the barons to back down. A fresh parliament was held in April, where the barons once again criticised Gaveston, demanding his exile, this time supported by Isabella and the French monarchy. Edward resisted, but finally acquiesced, agreeing to send Gaveston to Aquitaine, under threat of excommunication by the Archbishop of Canterbury should he return. At the last moment, Edward changed his mind and instead sent Gaveston to Dublin, appointing him as the Lord Lieutenant of Ireland.

Edward called for a fresh military campaign for Scotland, but this idea was quietly abandoned, and instead the king and the barons met in August 1308 to discuss reform. Behind the scenes, Edward started negotiations to convince both Pope Clement V and Philip IV to allow Gaveston to return to England, offering in exchange to suppress the Knights Templar in England, and to release Bishop Langton from prison. Edward called a new meeting of members of the Church and key barons in January 1309, and the leading earls then gathered in March and April, possibly under the leadership of Thomas, 2nd Earl of Lancaster. Another parliament followed, which refused to allow Gaveston to return to England, but offered to grant Edward additional taxes if he agreed to a programme of reform.

Edward sent assurances to the Pope that the conflict surrounding Gaveston's role was at an end. On the basis of these promises, and procedural concerns about how the original decision had been taken, the Pope agreed to annul the Archbishop's threat to excommunicate Gaveston, thus opening the possibility of Gaveston's return. Gaveston arrived back in England in June, where he was met by Edward. At the parliament the next month, Edward made a range of concessions to placate those opposed to Gaveston, including agreeing to limit the powers of the royal steward and the marshal of the royal household, to regulate the Crown's unpopular powers of purveyance, and to abandon recently enacted customs legislation; in return, parliament agreed to fresh taxes for the war in Scotland. Temporarily, at least, Edward and the barons appeared to have come to a successful compromise.

=== Ordinances of 1311 ===
Following his return, Gaveston's relationship with the major barons became increasingly difficult. He was considered arrogant, and he took to referring to the earls by offensive names, including calling one of their more powerful members the "dog of Warwick". The Earl of Lancaster and Gaveston's enemies refused to attend parliament in 1310 because Gaveston would be present. Edward was facing increasing financial problems, owing £22,000 to his Frescobaldi Italian bankers, and facing protests about how he was using his right of prises to acquire supplies for the war in Scotland. His attempts to raise an army for Scotland collapsed and the earls suspended the collection of the new taxes.

The king and parliament met again in February 1310, and the proposed discussions of Scottish policy were replaced by debate of domestic problems. Edward was petitioned to abandon Gaveston as his counsellor and instead adopt the advice of 21 elected barons, termed Ordainers, who would carry out a widespread reform of both the government and the royal household. Under huge pressure, he agreed to the proposal and the Ordainers were elected, broadly evenly split between reformers and conservatives. While the Ordainers began their plans for reform, Edward and Gaveston took a new army of around 4,700 men to Scotland, where the military situation had continued to deteriorate. Robert the Bruce declined to give battle and the campaign progressed ineffectually over the winter until supplies and money ran out in 1311, forcing Edward to return south.

By now the Ordainers had drawn up their Ordinances for reform and Edward had little political choice but to give way and accept them in October. The Ordinances of 1311 contained clauses limiting the king's right to go to war or to grant land without parliament's approval, giving parliament control over the royal administration, abolishing the system of prises, excluding the Frescobaldi bankers, and introducing a system to monitor the adherence to the Ordinances. In addition, the Ordinances exiled Gaveston once again, this time with instructions that he should not be allowed to live anywhere within Edward's lands, including Gascony and Ireland, and that he should be stripped of his titles. Edward retreated to his estates at Windsor and Kings Langley; Gaveston left England, possibly for northern France or Flanders.

== Mid-reign (1311–1321) ==
=== Death of Gaveston ===
Tensions between Edward and the barons remained high, and the earls opposed to the king kept their personal armies mobilised late into 1311. By now Edward had become estranged from his cousin, the Earl of Lancaster, who was also the Earl of Leicester, Lincoln, Salisbury and Derby, with an income of around £11,000 a year from his lands, almost double that of the next wealthiest baron. Backed by the earls of Arundel, Gloucester, Hereford, Pembroke and Warwick, Lancaster led a powerful faction in England, but he was not personally interested in practical administration, nor was he a particularly imaginative or effective politician.

Edward responded to the baronial threat by revoking the Ordinances and recalling Gaveston to England, being reunited with him at York in January 1312. The barons were furious and met in London, where Gaveston was excommunicated by the Archbishop of Canterbury and plans were put in place to capture Gaveston and prevent him from fleeing to Scotland. Edward, Isabella and Gaveston left for Newcastle, pursued by Lancaster and his followers. Abandoning many of their belongings, the royal party fled by ship and landed at Scarborough, where Gaveston stayed while Edward and Isabella returned to York. After a short siege, Gaveston surrendered to the earls of Pembroke and Surrey, on the promise that he would not be harmed. He had with him a huge collection of gold, silver and gems, probably part of the royal treasury, which he was later accused of having stolen from Edward.

On the way back from the north, Pembroke stopped in the village of Deddington in the Midlands, putting Gaveston under guard there while he went to visit his wife. The Earl of Warwick took this opportunity to seize Gaveston, taking him to Warwick Castle, where the Earl of Lancaster and the rest of his faction assembled on 18 June. At a brief trial, Gaveston was declared guilty of being a traitor under the terms of the Ordinances; he was beheaded on Blacklow Hill the following day, under the authority of Lancaster. Gaveston's body was not buried until 1315, when his funeral was held in Kings Langley Priory.

=== Tensions with Lancaster and France ===
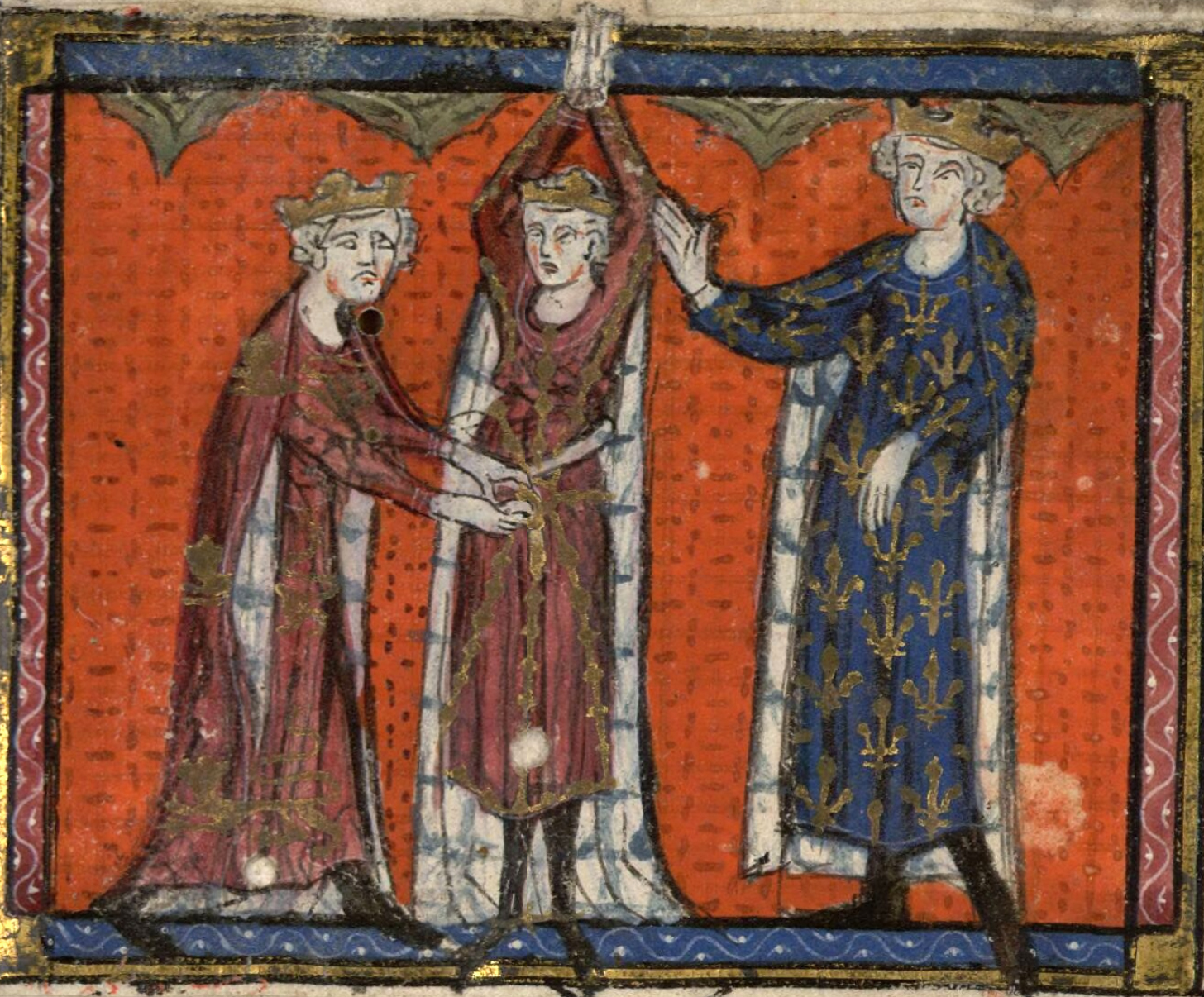
Edward (left) and Philip IV at the knighting ceremony in Notre Dame in Paris in 1312

Reactions to the death of Gaveston varied considerably. Edward was furious and deeply upset over what he saw as the murder of Gaveston; he made provisions for Gaveston's family, and intended to take revenge on the barons involved. The earls of Pembroke and Surrey were embarrassed and angry about Warwick's actions, and shifted their support to Edward in the aftermath. To Lancaster and his core of supporters, the execution had been both legal and necessary to preserve the stability of the kingdom. Civil war again appeared likely, but in December, the Earl of Pembroke negotiated a potential peace treaty between the two sides, which would pardon the opposition barons for the killing of Gaveston, in exchange for their support for a fresh campaign in Scotland. Lancaster and Warwick, however, did not give the treaty their immediate approval, and further negotiations continued through most of 1313.

Meanwhile, the Earl of Pembroke had been negotiating with France to resolve the long-standing disagreements over the administration of Gascony, and as part of this Edward and Isabella agreed to travel to Paris in June 1313 to meet with Philip IV. Edward probably hoped both to resolve the problems in the south of France and to win Philip's support in the dispute with the barons; for Philip it was an opportunity to impress his son-in-law with his power and wealth. It proved a spectacular visit, including a grand ceremony in which the two kings knighted Philip's sons and two hundred other men in Notre-Dame de Paris, large banquets along the River Seine, and a public declaration that both kings and their queens would join a crusade to the Levant. Philip gave lenient terms for settling the problems in Gascony, and the event was spoiled only by a serious fire in Edward's quarters.

On his return from France, Edward found his political position greatly strengthened. After intense negotiation, the earls, including Lancaster and Warwick, came to a compromise in October 1313, fundamentally very similar to the draft agreement of the previous December. Edward's finances improved, thanks to parliament agreeing to the raising of taxes, a loan of 160,000 florins (£25,000) from the Pope, £33,000 borrowed from Philip, and further loans organised by Edward's new Italian banker, Antonio Pessagno. For the first time in his reign, Edward's government was well funded.

=== Battle of Bannockburn ===
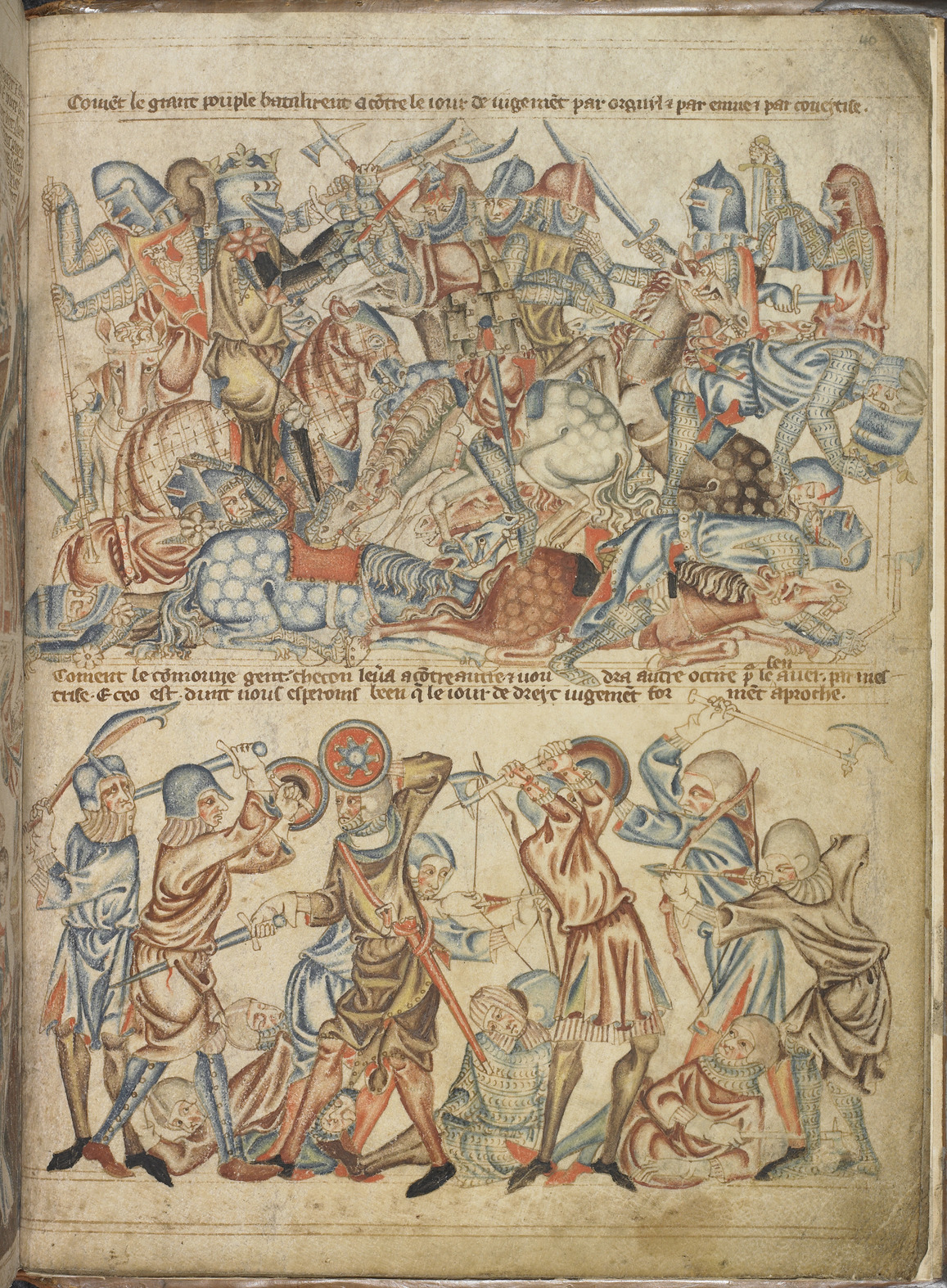
Depiction of the Battle of Bannockburn in 1314 from the Holkham Bible, now in the British Library

By 1314, Robert the Bruce had recaptured most of the castles in Scotland once held by Edward, pushing raiding parties into northern England as far as Carlisle. In response, Edward planned a major military campaign with the support of Lancaster and the barons, mustering a large army between 15,000 and 20,000 strong. Meanwhile, Robert had besieged Stirling Castle, a key fortification in Scotland; its English commander had stated that unless Edward arrived by 24 June, he would surrender. News of this reached the king in late May, and he decided to speed up his march north from Berwick-upon-Tweed to relieve the castle. Robert, with between 5,500 and 6,500 troops, predominantly spearmen, prepared to prevent Edward's forces from reaching Stirling.

The battle began on 23 June as the English army attempted to force its way across the high ground of the Bannock Burn, which was surrounded by marshland. Skirmishing between the two sides broke out, resulting in the death of Sir Henry de Bohun, whom Robert killed in personal combat. Edward continued his advance the following day, and encountered the bulk of the Scottish army as they emerged from the woods of New Park. Edward appears not to have expected the Scots to give battle here, and as a result had kept his forces in marching, rather than battle, order, with the archers—who would usually have been used to break up enemy spear formations—at the back of his army, rather than the front. His cavalry found it hard to operate in the cramped terrain and were crushed by Robert's spearmen. The English army was overwhelmed and its leaders were unable to regain control.

Edward stayed behind to fight, but it became obvious to the Earl of Pembroke that the battle was lost and he dragged the king away from the battlefield, hotly pursued by the Scottish forces. Edward only just escaped the heavy fighting, making a vow to found a Carmelite religious house at Oxford if he survived. The historian Roy Haines describes the defeat as a "calamity of stunning proportions" for the English, whose losses in the battle were huge. In the aftermath of the defeat, Edward retreated to Dunbar, then travelled by ship to Berwick, and then back to York; in his absence, Stirling Castle quickly fell.

=== Famine and criticism ===
After the fiasco of Bannockburn, the Earls of Lancaster and Warwick saw their political influence increase, and they pressured Edward to re-implement the Ordinances of 1311. Lancaster became the head of the royal council in 1316, promising to take forward the Ordinances through a new reform commission, but he appears to have abandoned this role soon afterwards, partially because of disagreements with the other barons, and possibly because of ill-health. Lancaster refused to meet with Edward in parliament for the next two years, bringing effective governance to a standstill. This stymied any hopes for a fresh campaign into Scotland and raised fears of civil war. After much negotiation, once again involving the Earl of Pembroke, Edward and Lancaster finally agreed to the Treaty of Leake in August 1318, which pardoned Lancaster and his faction and established a new royal council, temporarily averting conflict.

Edward's difficulties were exacerbated by prolonged problems in English agriculture, part of a wider phenomenon in northern Europe known as the Great Famine. It began with torrential rains in late 1314, followed by a very cold winter and heavy rains the following spring that killed many sheep and cattle. The bad weather continued, almost unabated, into 1321, resulting in a string of bad harvests. Revenues from the exports of wool plummeted and the price of food rose, despite attempts by Edward's government to control prices. Edward called for hoarders to release food, and tried to encourage both internal trade and the importation of grain, but with little success. The requisitioning of provisions for the royal court during the famine years only added to tensions.

Meanwhile, Robert the Bruce exploited his victory at Bannockburn to raid northern England, initially attacking Carlisle and Berwick, and then reaching further south into Lancashire and Yorkshire, even threatening York itself. Edward undertook an expensive but unsuccessful campaign to stem the advance in 1319, but the famine made it increasingly difficult to keep his garrisons supplied with food. Meanwhile, a Scottish expedition led by Robert's brother Edward Bruce successfully invaded Ireland in 1315. Edward Bruce declared himself the High King of Ireland. He was finally defeated in 1318 by Edward II's Irish justiciar, Edmund Butler, at the Battle of Faughart, and Edward Bruce's severed head was sent back to Edward II. Revolts also broke out in Lancashire and Bristol in 1315, and in Glamorgan in Wales in 1316, but were suppressed.

The famine and the Scottish policy were felt to be a punishment from God, and complaints about Edward multiplied, one contemporary poem describing the "Evil Times of Edward II". Many criticised Edward's "improper" and ignoble interest in rural pursuits. In 1318, a mentally ill man named John of Powderham appeared in Oxford, claiming that he was the real Edward II, and that Edward was a changeling, swapped at birth. John was duly executed, but his claims resonated with those criticising Edward for his lack of regal behaviour and steady leadership. Opposition also grew around Edward's treatment of his royal favourites.

Edward had managed to retain some of his previous advisers, despite attempts by the Ordainers to remove them, and divided the extensive de Clare inheritance between two of his new favourites, the former household knights Hugh Audley and Roger Damory, instantly making them extremely rich. (Note: The de Clare inheritance had belonged to Gilbert de Clare, the late Earl of Gloucester, who died fighting at Bannockburn. The estates were divided up among his three sisters, one of whom was already married to Hugh Despenser the Younger.) Many of the moderates who had helped deliver the peaceful compromise in 1318 now began to turn against Edward, making violence ever more likely.

== Later reign (1321–1326) ==
=== The Despenser War ===
The long-threatened civil war finally broke out in England in 1321, triggered by the tension between many of the barons and the royal favourites, the Despenser family. Hugh Despenser the Elder had served both Edward and his father, while Hugh Despenser the Younger had married into the wealthy de Clare family, become the King's chamberlain, and acquired Glamorgan in the Welsh Marches in 1317. Hugh the Younger subsequently expanded his holdings and power across Wales, mainly at the expense of the other Marcher Lords. The Earl of Lancaster and the Despensers were fierce enemies, and Lancaster's antipathy was shared by most of the Despensers' neighbours, including the Earl of Hereford, the Mortimer family and the recently elevated Hugh Audley and Roger Damory. Edward, however, increasingly relied on the Despensers for advice and support, and he was particularly close to Hugh the Younger, whom one chronicler noted he "loved ... dearly with all his heart and mind".

In early 1321, Lancaster mobilised a coalition of the Despensers' enemies across the Marcher territories. Edward and Hugh the Younger became aware of these plans in March and headed west, hoping that negotiations led by the moderate Earl of Pembroke would defuse the crisis. This time, Pembroke made his excuses and declined to intervene, and war broke out in May. The Despensers' lands were quickly seized by a coalition of the Marcher Lords and the local gentry, and Lancaster held a high-level gathering of the barons and clergy in June which condemned the Despensers for having broken the Ordinances. Edward attempted reconciliation, but in July the opposition occupied London and called for the permanent removal of the Despensers. Fearing that he might be deposed if he refused, Edward agreed to exile the Despensers and pardoned the Marcher Lords for their actions.

Edward began to plan his revenge. With the help of Pembroke, he formed a small coalition of his half-brothers, a few of the earls and some of the senior clergy, and prepared for war. Edward started with Bartholomew de Badlesmere, 1st Baron Badlesmere, and Isabella was sent to Bartholomew's stronghold, Leeds Castle, to deliberately create a casus belli. Bartholomew's wife, Margaret, took the bait and her men killed several of Isabella's retinue, giving Edward an excuse to intervene. Lancaster refused to help Bartholomew, his personal enemy, and Edward quickly regained control of south-east England. Alarmed, Lancaster now mobilised his own army in the north of England, and Edward mustered his own forces in the south-west. The Despensers returned from exile and were pardoned by the royal council.

In December, Edward led his army across the River Severn and advanced into the Welsh Marches, where the opposition forces had gathered. The coalition of Marcher Lords crumbled and the Mortimers surrendered to Edward, but Damory, Audley, and the Earl of Hereford marched north in January to join Lancaster, who had laid siege the king's castle at Tickhill. Bolstered by fresh reinforcements from the Marcher Lords, Edward pursued them, meeting Lancaster's army on 10 March at Burton-on-Trent. Lancaster, outnumbered, retreated without a fight, fleeing north. Andrew Harclay cornered Lancaster at the Battle of Boroughbridge, and captured the earl. Edward and Hugh the Younger met Lancaster at Pontefract Castle, where, after a summary trial, the earl was found guilty of treason and beheaded.

=== Edward and the Despensers ===
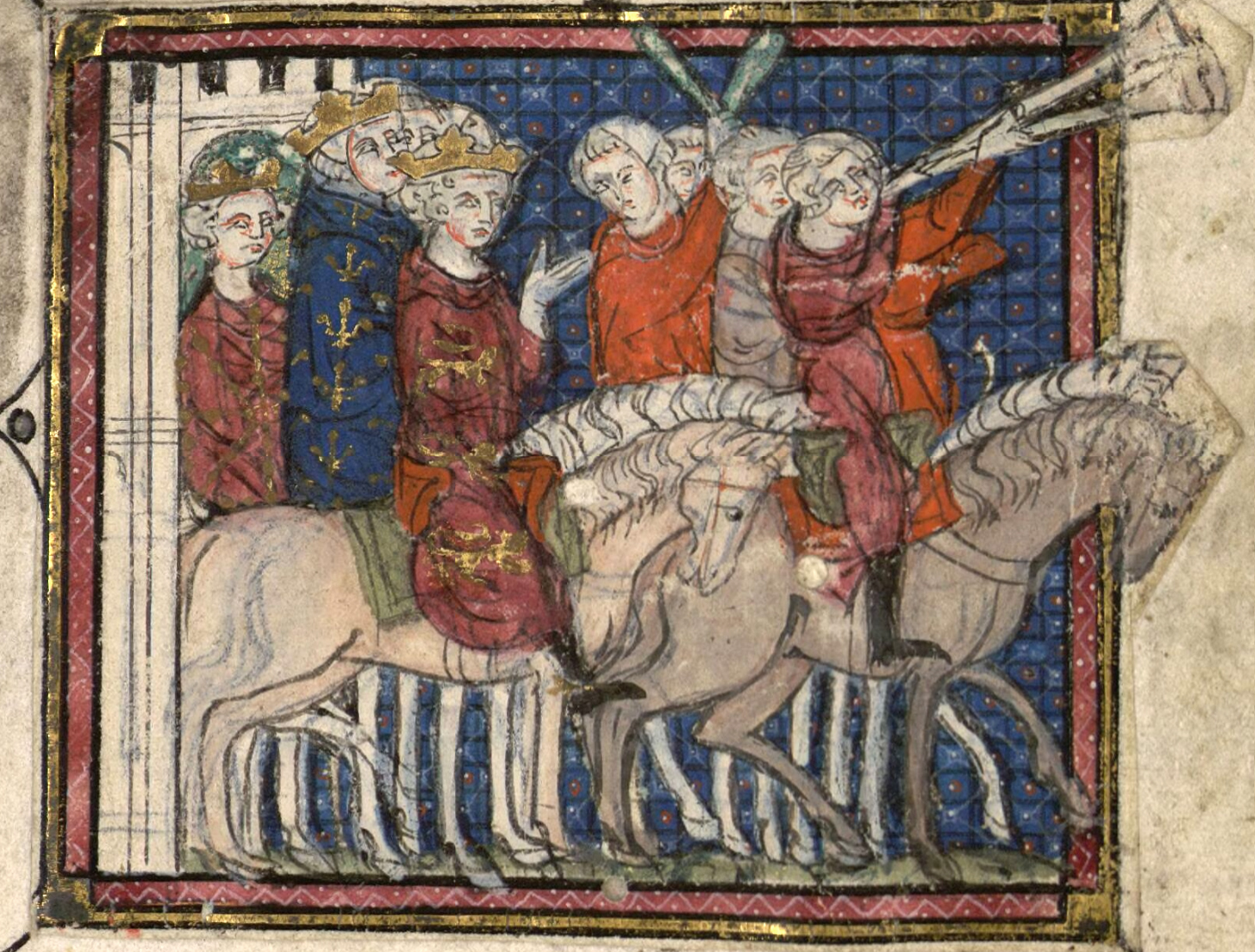
Edward (third from the left) hunting with Philip IV

Edward punished Lancaster's supporters through a system of special courts across the country, with the judges instructed in advance how to sentence the accused, who were not allowed to speak in their own defence. Many of these so-called "Contrariants" were simply executed, and others were imprisoned or fined, with their lands seized and their surviving relatives detained. The Earl of Pembroke, whom Edward now mistrusted, was arrested; he was released only after pledging all his possessions as collateral for his own loyalty. Edward was able to reward his loyal supporters, especially the Despenser family, with the confiscated estates and new titles. The fines and confiscations made Edward rich: almost £15,000 was brought in during the first few months, and by 1326, Edward's treasury contained £62,000. A parliament was held at York on 2 May 1322 at which the Ordinances were formally revoked through the Statute of York, and fresh taxes agreed for a new campaign against the Scots.

The English campaign against Scotland was planned on a massive scale, with a force of about 23,000 men. Edward advanced through Lothian towards Edinburgh, but Robert the Bruce declined to meet him in battle, drawing Edward further into Scotland. Plans to resupply the campaign by sea failed, and the large army rapidly ran out of food. Edward was forced to retreat south of the border, pursued by Scottish raiding parties. Edward's illegitimate son, Adam, died during the campaign, and the raiding parties almost captured Isabella, who was staying at Tynemouth and was forced to flee by sea. Edward planned a fresh campaign, backed by a round of further taxes, but confidence in his Scottish policy was diminishing. Andrew Harclay, instrumental in securing Edward's victories the previous year and recently made the Earl of Carlisle, independently negotiated a peace treaty with Robert the Bruce, proposing that Edward would recognise Robert as the King of Scotland and that, in return, Robert would cease to interfere in England. Edward was furious and immediately executed Harclay, but agreed to a thirteen-year truce with Robert.

Hugh Despenser the Younger lived and ruled in grand style, playing a leading role in Edward's government, and executing policy through a wide network of family retainers. Supported by Chancellor Robert Baldock and Lord Treasurer Walter Stapledon, the Despensers accumulated land and wealth, using their position in government to provide superficial cover for what historian Seymour Phillips describes as "the reality of fraud, threats of violence and abuse of legal procedure". Meanwhile, Edward faced growing opposition. Miracles were reported around the late Earl of Lancaster's tomb, and at the gallows used to execute members of the opposition in Bristol. Law and order began to break down, encouraged by the chaos caused by the seizure of lands. The old opposition consisting of Marcher Lords' associates attempted to free the prisoners Edward held in Wallingford Castle, and Roger Mortimer, one of the most prominent of the imprisoned Marcher Lords, escaped from the Tower of London and fled to France.

=== War with France ===
The disagreements between Edward and the French Crown over the Duchy of Gascony led to the War of Saint-Sardos in 1324. Charles, Edward's brother-in-law, had become King of France in 1322, and was more aggressive than his predecessors. In 1323, he insisted that Edward come to Paris to give homage for Gascony, and demanded that Edward's administrators in Gascony allow French officials there to carry out orders given in Paris. Matters came to a head in October when a group of Edward's soldiers hanged a French sergeant for attempting to build a new fortified town in the Agenais, a contested section of the Gascon border. Edward denied any responsibility for this incident, but relations between Edward and Charles soured. In 1324, Edward dispatched the Earl of Pembroke to Paris to broker a solution, but the earl died suddenly of an illness along the way. Charles mobilised his army and ordered the invasion of Gascony.

Edward's forces in Gascony were around 4,400 strong, but the French army, commanded by Charles of Valois, numbered 7,000. Valois took the Agenais and then advanced further and cut off the main city of Bordeaux. In response, Edward ordered the arrest of any French persons in England and seized Isabella's lands, on the basis that she was of French origin. In November 1324 he met with the earls and the English Church, who recommended that Edward should lead a force of 11,000 men to Gascony. Edward decided not to go personally, sending instead the Earl of Surrey. Meanwhile, Edward opened up fresh negotiations with the French king. Charles advanced various proposals, the most tempting of which was the suggestion that if Isabella and Prince Edward were to travel to Paris, and the prince was to give homage to Charles for Gascony, he would terminate the war and return the Agenais. Edward and his advisers had concerns about sending the prince to France, but agreed to send Isabella on her own as an envoy in March 1325.

== Fall from power (1326–1327) ==
=== Rift with Isabella ===
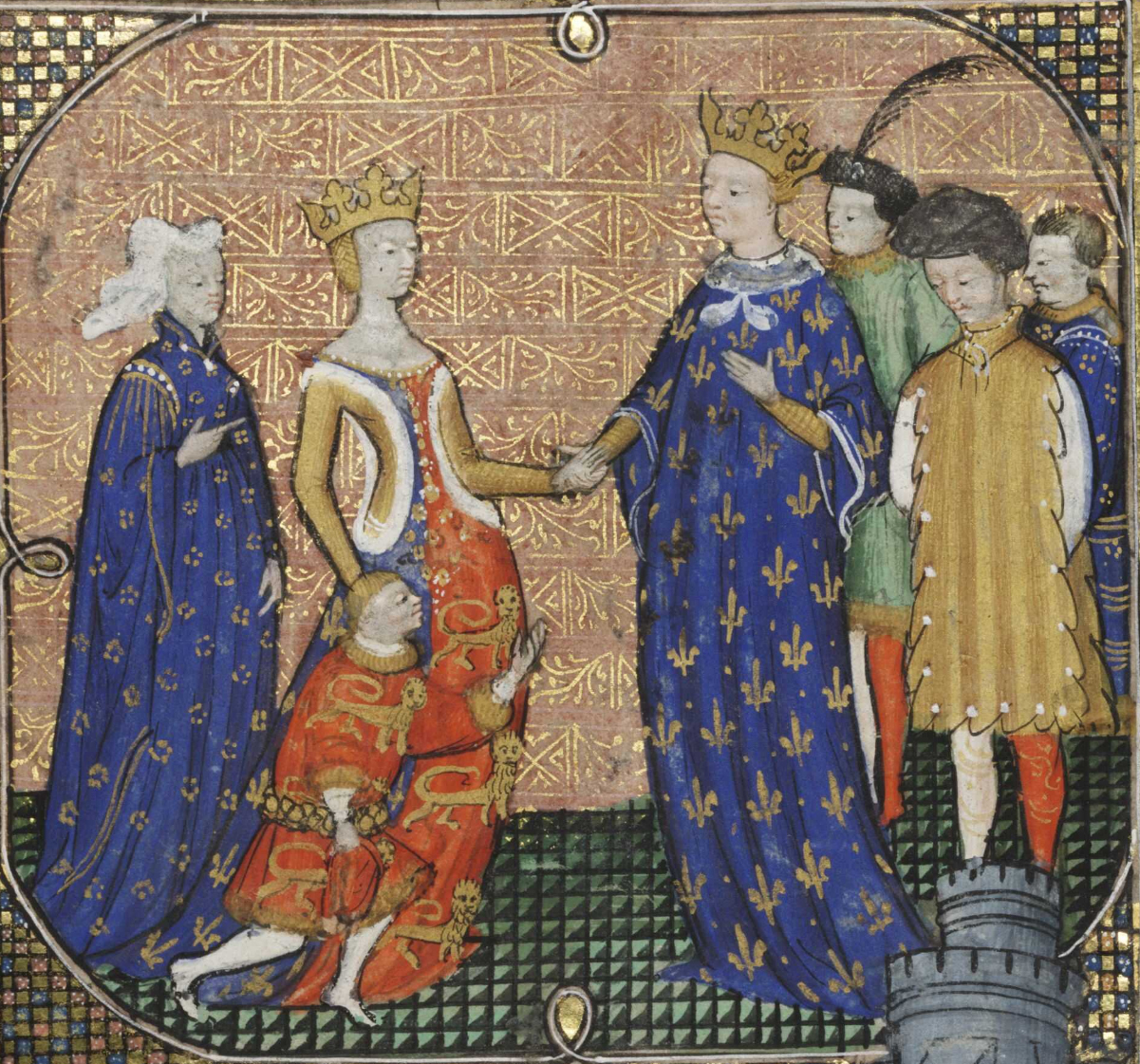
The future Edward III giving homage in 1325 to Charles IV under the guidance of Isabella of France

Isabella, with Edward's envoys, carried out negotiations with the French in late March. The negotiations proved difficult, and they arrived at a settlement only after Isabella personally intervened with her brother, Charles. The terms favoured the French Crown: In particular, Edward would give homage in person to Charles for Gascony. Concerned about the consequences of war breaking out once again, Edward agreed to the treaty but decided to give Gascony to his son, Edward, and sent the prince to give homage in Paris. The young Prince Edward crossed the English Channel and completed the bargain in September. (Note: Edward's lawyers put forward various arguments in the dispute with the French kings. One line of argument stemmed from the 1259 treaty agreed by Edward's grandfather, Henry III, under which Henry had agreed to give homage for Gascony; Edward's lawyers observed that this treaty, which underpinned Edward's 1303 treaty with France, had been a bilateral agreement between the two kings, rather than a conventional feudal agreement. As such, Edward's offering homage for Gascony was dependent on the French crown delivering on its own commitments, rather than an absolute duty. Edward's lawyers also argued that Isabella had a potential claim to the lands in the south under customary French law. When granting Gascony to Isabella, Phillip IV appeared to have been dividing up his lands, as was customary at the time, rather than giving a conditional grant, which meant that Gascony was an allod, Edward's personal property, and as such not subject to the French king's laws on the carrying of weapons or money.)

Edward now expected Isabella and their son to return to England, but instead she remained in France and showed no intention of making her way back. Until 1322, Edward and Isabella's marriage appears to have been successful, but by the time Isabella left for France in 1325, it had deteriorated. Isabella appears to have disliked Hugh Despenser the Younger intensely, not least because of his abuse of high-status women. Isabella was embarrassed that she had fled from Scottish armies three times during her marriage to Edward, and she blamed Hugh for the final occurrence in 1322. When Edward had negotiated the recent truce with Robert the Bruce, he had severely disadvantaged a range of noble families who owned land in Scotland, including the Beaumonts, close friends of Isabella. She was also angry about the arrest of her household and seizure of her lands in 1324. Finally, Edward had taken away her children and given custody of them to Hugh Despenser's wife.

By February 1326 it was clear that Isabella was involved in a relationship with an exiled Marcher Lord, Roger Mortimer. It is unclear when Isabella first met Mortimer or when their relationship began, but they both wanted to see Edward and the Despensers removed from power. (Note: Historian Roy Haines stresses the lack of evidence for any earlier relationship, while Paul Doherty argues that there is no evidence for them having been closely involved before December 1325, although he suspects that they may have been friends by 1323. While agreeing that there is no documentary evidence available, Ian Mortimer takes a more radical perspective, arguing that they met much earlier, and that Isabella helped Mortimer escape from the Tower of London in 1323.) Edward appealed for his son to return, and for Charles to intervene on his behalf, but this had no effect.

Edward's opponents began to gather around Isabella and Mortimer in Paris, and Edward became increasingly anxious about the possibility that Mortimer might invade England. Isabella and Mortimer turned to William I, Count of Hainaut, and proposed a marriage between Prince Edward and William's daughter, Philippa. In return for the advantageous alliance with the English heir to the throne, and a sizeable dower for the bride, William offered 132 transport vessels and eight warships to assist in the invasion of England. Prince Edward and Philippa were betrothed on 27 August, and Isabella and Mortimer prepared for their campaign.

=== Invasion ===
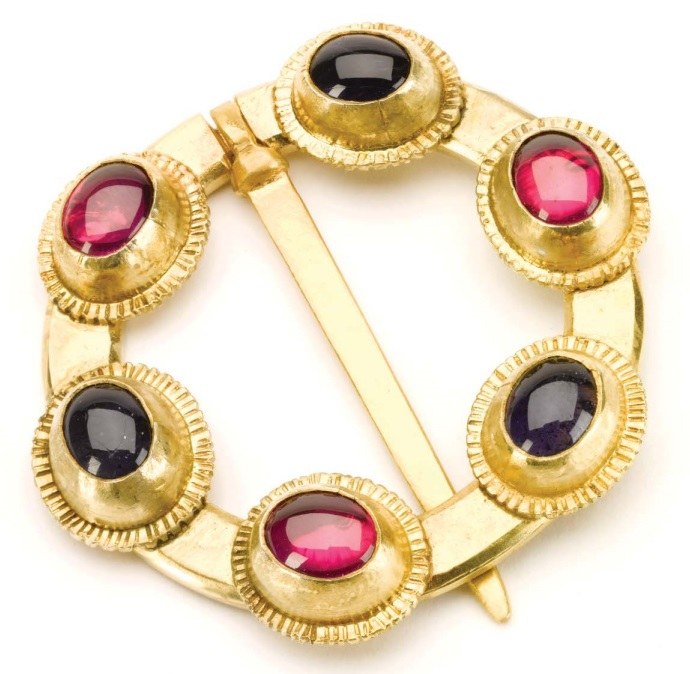
Replica of the Oxwich Brooch, found at Oxwich Castle in Wales, and probably owned by Edward and looted during the events of 1326

During August and September 1326, Edward mobilised his defences along the coasts of England to protect against the possibility of an invasion either by France or by Roger Mortimer. Fleets were gathered at the ports of Portsmouth in the south and Orwell on the east coast, and a raiding force of 1,600 men was sent across the English Channel into Normandy as a diversionary attack. Edward issued a nationalistic appeal for his subjects to defend the kingdom, but with little impact. The regime's hold on power at the local level was fragile, the Despensers were widely disliked, and many of those Edward entrusted with the defence of the kingdom proved incompetent or promptly turned against the regime. Some 2,000 men were ordered to gather at Orwell to repel any invasion, but only 55 appear to have actually arrived.

Roger Mortimer, Isabella and thirteen-year-old Prince Edward, accompanied by King Edward's half-brother Edmund of Woodstock, landed in Orwell on 24 September with a small force of men and met with no resistance. Instead, enemies of the Despensers moved rapidly to join them, including Edward's other half-brother, Thomas of Brotherton; Henry, 3rd Earl of Lancaster, who had inherited the earldom from his brother Thomas; and a range of senior clergy. Ensconced in the residence halls of the fortified and secure Tower of London, Edward attempted to garner support from within the capital. The city of London rose against his government, and on 2 October he left London, taking the Despensers with him. London descended into anarchy, as mobs attacked Edward's remaining officials and associates, killing his former treasurer Walter Stapledon in St Paul's Cathedral, and taking the Tower and releasing the prisoners inside.

Edward continued west up the Thames Valley, reaching Gloucester between 9 and 12 October; he hoped to reach Wales and from there mobilise an army against the invaders. Mortimer and Isabella were not far behind. Proclamations condemned the Despensers' recent regime. Day by day they gathered new supporters. Edward and the younger Despenser crossed over the border and set sail from Chepstow, probably aiming first for Lundy and then for Ireland, where the king hoped to receive refuge and raise a fresh army. Bad weather drove them back, though, and they landed at Cardiff. Edward retreated to Caerphilly Castle and attempted to rally his remaining forces.

Edward's authority collapsed in England where, in his absence, Isabella's faction took over the administration with the support of the Church. Her forces surrounded Bristol, where Hugh Despenser the Elder had taken shelter; he surrendered and was promptly executed. Edward and Hugh the Younger fled their castle around 2 November, leaving behind jewellery, considerable supplies, and at least £13,000 in cash, possibly once again hoping to reach Ireland, but on 16 November they were betrayed and captured by a search party north of Caerphilly. Edward was escorted first to Monmouth Castle, and from there back into England, where he was held at the Earl of Lancaster's fortress at Kenilworth. Edward's final remaining forces, by now besieged in Caerphilly Castle, surrendered after four months in March 1327.

=== Abdication ===
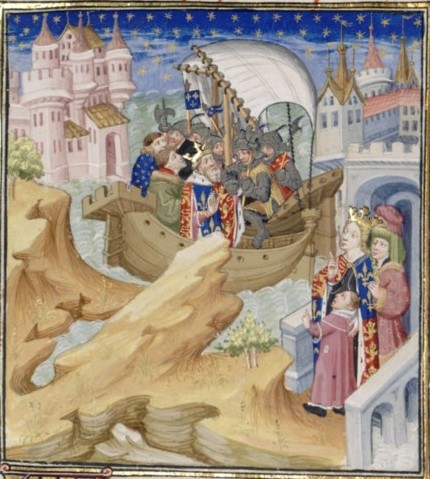
A 15th-century depiction of Isabella capturing Edward

Isabella and Mortimer rapidly took revenge on the former regime. Hugh Despenser the Younger was put on trial, declared a traitor and sentenced to be disembowelled, castrated and quartered; he was duly executed on 24 November 1326. Edward's former chancellor, Robert Baldock, died in Fleet Prison; the Earl of Arundel was beheaded. Edward's position, however, was problematic; he was still married to Isabella and, in principle, he remained the king, but most of the new administration had much to lose were he to be released and potentially regain power.

There was no established procedure for removing an English king. Adam Orleton, the bishop of Hereford, made a series of public allegations about Edward's conduct as king, and in January 1327 a parliament convened at Westminster at which the question of Edward's future was raised; Edward refused to attend the gathering. Parliament, initially ambivalent, responded to the London crowds that called for the king's son Edward to take the throne. On 12 January the leading barons and clergy agreed that Edward II should be removed and replaced by his son. The following day it was presented to an assembly of the barons, where it was argued that Edward's weak leadership and personal faults had led the kingdom into disaster, and that he was incompetent to lead the country.

Shortly after this, a representative delegation of barons, clergy and knights was sent to Kenilworth to speak to the king. On 20 January 1327, the Earl of Lancaster and the bishops of Winchester and Lincoln met privately with Edward in the castle. They informed Edward that if he were to resign as monarch, his son Edward would succeed him, but if he failed to do so, his son might be disinherited as well, and the crown given to an alternative candidate. In tears, Edward agreed to abdicate, and on 21 January, Sir William Trussell, representing the kingdom as a whole, withdrew his homage and formally ended Edward's reign. A proclamation was sent to London, announcing that Edward, now known as Edward of Caernarvon, had freely resigned his kingdom and that his son Edward would succeed him. The coronation took place at Westminster Abbey on 1 February 1327.

== Death (1327) ==
=== Death and aftermath ===
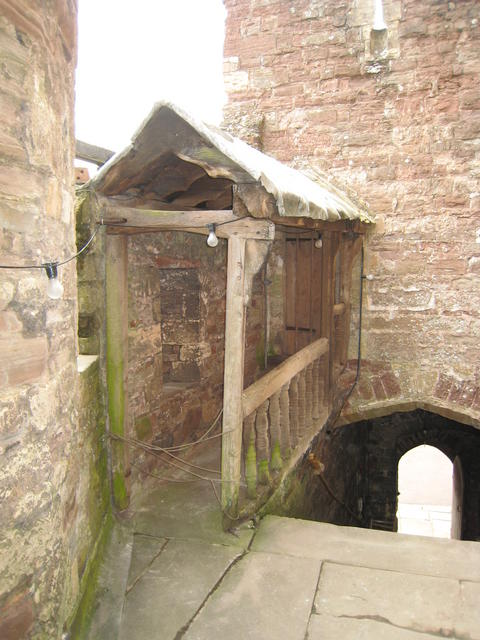
Covered walkway leading to a cell within Berkeley Castle, by tradition associated with Edward's imprisonment

Those opposed to the new government began to make plans to free Edward, and Roger Mortimer decided to move him to the more secure location of Berkeley Castle in Gloucestershire, where Edward arrived around 5 April 1327. Once at the castle, he was kept in the custody of Mortimer's son-in-law, Thomas de Berkeley, 3rd Baron Berkeley, and John Maltravers, who were given £5 a day for Edward's maintenance. It is unclear how well cared for Edward was; the records show luxury goods being bought on his behalf, but some chroniclers suggest that he was often mistreated. A poem, the "Lament of Edward II", has been attributed to Edward during his imprisonment by some scholars, but this is disputed. (Note: For a sceptical comment, see Vivian Galbraith; May McKisack reserved judgement, noting that "if he was indeed the author of the Anglo-Norman lament ascribed to him, he knew something of versification"; M. Smallwood feels that "the authorship question has not been settled"; Claire Valente writes "I think it unlikely that Edward II wrote the poem".)

Concerns continued to be raised over fresh plots to liberate Edward, some involving the Dominican order and former household knights, and one such attempt got at least as far as breaking into the prison within the castle. As a result of these threats, Edward was moved around to other locations in secret for a period, before returning to permanent custody at the castle in late summer 1327. The political situation remained unstable, and new plots appear to have been formed to free him.

On 23 September Edward III was informed that his father had died at Berkeley Castle during the night of 21 September. Without verifying it, Edward III started disseminating the news. Most historians take the view that Edward II died at Berkeley on that date, even though there is no more evidence for it than a letter that was later disputed by the sender, Thomas de Berkeley, in parliament in 1330. There is a minority view that he died much later. (Note: Mainstream historical interpretations of Edward's death include those of Seymour Phillips, who argues that it is "likely that he was murdered, probably by suffocation"; Roy Haines, who suggests that he was probably murdered and that "there is little reason to doubt that Edward of Caernarfon's corpse has remained there [Gloucester Cathedral] undisturbed since December 1327 or thereabouts"; Mira Rubin, who concludes that Edward may have been murdered; Michael Prestwich, who has "no doubt" that Mortimer plotted to murder Edward, and that he "almost certainly died at Berkeley"; Joe Burden, who believes that Mortimer issued orders for Edward to be killed, and that Edward was buried at Gloucester; Mark Ormrod, who argues that Edward was probably murdered, and Edward is buried at Gloucester; Jeffrey Hamilton, who finds the argument that Edward survived Berkeley "fantastic"; and Chris Given-Wilson, who believes it is "almost certainly ... true" that Edward died on the night of 21 September and was murdered.) His death was, as Mark Ormrod notes, "suspiciously timely", as it simplified Mortimer's political problems considerably, and most historians believe that Edward was probably murdered on the orders of the new regime, although it is impossible to be certain. Several of the individuals suspected of involvement in the death, including Sir Thomas Gurney, Maltravers and William Ockley, later fled. (Note: Thomas Berkeley was spared by Edward III, after a jury concluded in 1331 that he had not been involved in the killing of the late king. The same jury found that William Ockley and Thomas Gurney had been responsible for the death. Ockley was not heard of again, but Gurney fled and was pursued across Europe, where he was captured in Naples; he died as he was being returned to England. John Maltravers was not formally accused of murdering Edward II but left for Europe and from there contacted Edward III, possibly to make a deal over what he knew about the events of 1327; after a period in exile he was ultimately pardoned and given permission to return to England in 1351.) If Edward died from natural causes, his death may have been hastened by depression following his imprisonment.

The rule of Isabella and Mortimer did not last long after the announcement of Edward's death. They made peace with the Scots in the Treaty of Northampton, but this move was highly unpopular. Isabella and Mortimer both amassed and spent great wealth, and criticism of them mounted. Relations between Mortimer and Edward III became strained and in 1330 the king conducted a coup d'état at Nottingham Castle. He arrested Mortimer and then executed him on fourteen charges of treason, including the murder of Edward II. Edward III's government sought to blame Mortimer for all the recent problems, effectively politically rehabilitating Edward II. Edward III placed his mother under arrest, but she was released soon after.

=== Burial and cult ===
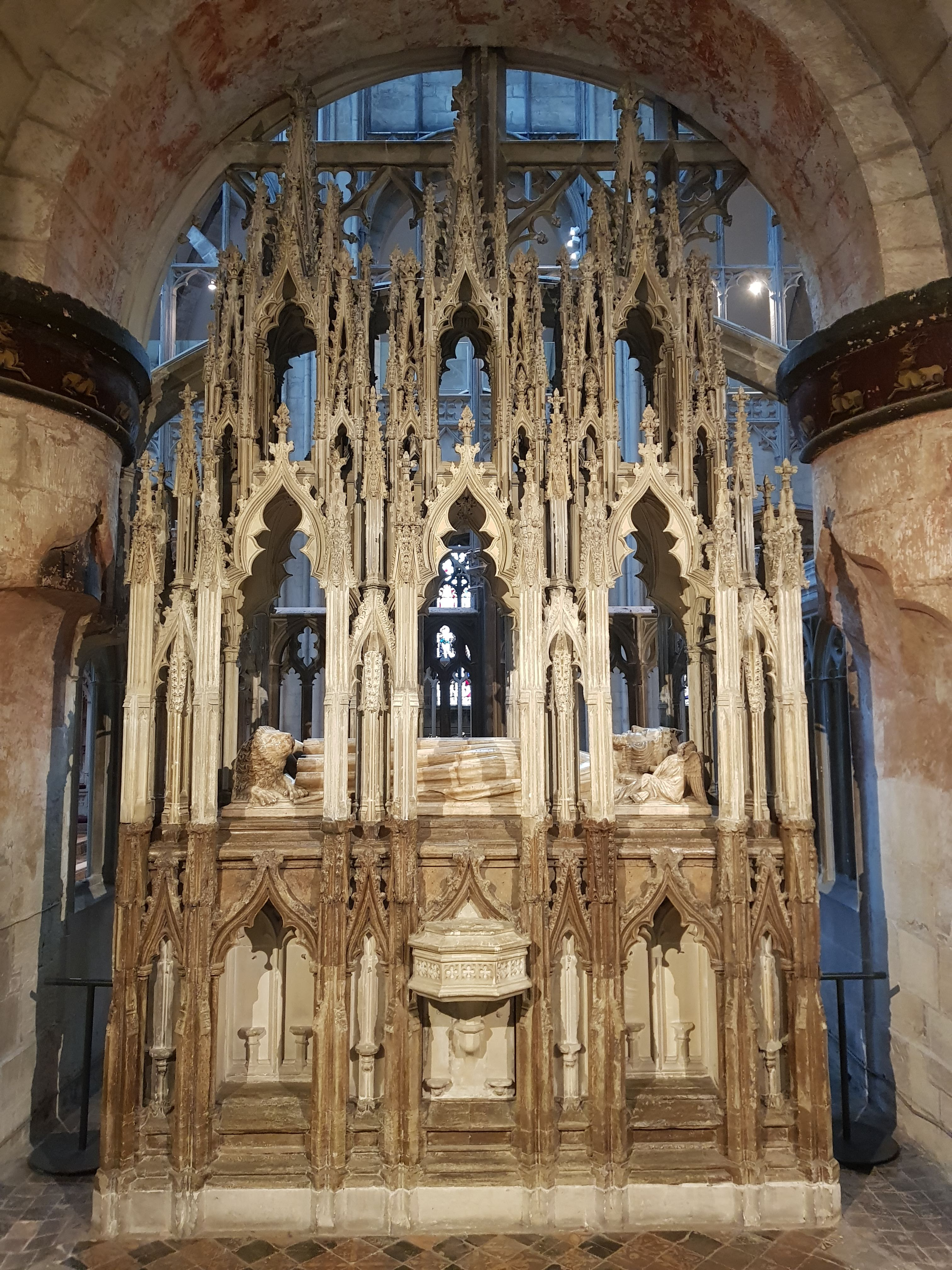
Edward II's tomb at Gloucester Cathedral

Edward's body was embalmed at Berkeley Castle, where it was viewed by local leaders from Bristol and Gloucester. It was then taken to Gloucester Abbey on 21 October, and on 20 December, Edward was buried by the high altar, the funeral having probably been delayed to allow Edward III to attend in person. (Note: The historian Joel Burden notes that this delay in burial was not unusual for the period; the bodies of many other royalty, including Edward I and Isabella of France, remained unburied for a similar period.) Gloucester was probably chosen because other abbeys had refused or been forbidden to take the king's body, and because it was close to Berkeley. (Note: Although it was normal for Westminster Abbey to be used to bury English monarchs by the 14th century, the practice was not as formalised as it later became.) The funeral was a grand affair and cost £351 in total, complete with gilt lions, standards painted with gold leaf and oak barriers to manage the anticipated crowds. Edward III's government probably hoped to put a veneer of normality over the recent political events, increasing the legitimacy of the young king's own reign.

A temporary wooden effigy with a copper crown was made for the funeral; this is the first known use of a funeral effigy in England, and was probably necessary because of the condition of the King's body, as he had been dead for three months. Edward's heart was removed, placed in a silver container, and later buried with Isabella at Newgate Church in London. His tomb includes a very early example of an English alabaster effigy, with a tomb chest and a canopy made of oolite and Purbeck stone. Edward was buried in the shirt, coif and gloves from his coronation, and his effigy depicts him as king, holding a sceptre and orb, and wearing a strawberry-leaf crown. The effigy features a pronounced lower lip, and may be a close likeness of Edward. (Note: Earlier scholarship had argued that the effigy on the tomb was an idealised carving, although more recent work has put more emphasis on its likely resemblance to Edward II.)

Edward II's tomb rapidly became a popular site for visitors, probably encouraged by the local monks, who lacked an existing pilgrimage attraction. Visitors donated extensively to the abbey, allowing the monks to rebuild much of the surrounding church in the 1330s. Miracles reportedly took place at the tomb, and modifications had to be made to enable visitors to walk around it in larger numbers. The chronicler Geoffrey le Baker depicted Edward as a saintly, tortured martyr, and Richard II gave royal support for an unsuccessful bid to have Edward canonised in 1395. The tomb was opened by officials in 1855, uncovering a wooden coffin, still in good condition, and a sealed lead coffin inside it. The tomb remains in what is now Gloucester Cathedral, and was extensively restored in 2007 and 2008 at a cost of over £100,000.

=== Controversies ===
Controversy rapidly surrounded Edward's death. With Mortimer's execution in 1330, rumours began to circulate that Edward had been murdered at Berkeley Castle. Accounts that he had been killed by the insertion of a red-hot iron or poker into his anus slowly began to spread, possibly as a result of deliberate propaganda; chroniclers in the mid-1330s and 1340s disseminated this account further, supported in later years by Geoffrey le Baker's colourful account of the killing. It became incorporated into most later histories of Edward, typically being linked to his possible homosexuality. Most historians now dismiss this account of Edward's death, querying the logic in his captors murdering him in such an easily detectable fashion. (Note: Initial sources either did not suggest that Edward had been murdered at all, or suggested that he had been suffocated or strangled. The first sources to begin to successfully popularise the "anal rape" narrative were the longer Brut and Polychronicon chronicles in the mid-1330s and 1340s, respectively. One of Edward's biographers, Seymour Phillips, notes that while the hot iron story could be true, it is much more likely that he was suffocated, noting that the account of the red-hot iron seems suspiciously similar to earlier accounts of the murder of King Edmund Ironside; the similarities to this earlier story are also highlighted by Ian Mortimer and Pierre Chaplais. His other biographer, Roy Haines, makes no reference at all to the red-hot poker story. Ian Mortimer, who argues that Edward did not die in 1327, naturally disputes the "anal rape" story. Paul Doherty notes that modern historians take the "lurid description of Edward's death with more than a pinch of salt". Michael Prestwich has noted that most of Geoffrey le Baker's story "belongs to the world of romance rather than of history", but has also noted that Edward "very possibly" died from the insertion of a red-hot iron.)

Another set of theories surround the possibility that Edward did not really die in 1327. These theories typically involve the "Fieschi Letter", sent to Edward III by an Italian priest called Manuel Fieschi, who claimed that Edward escaped Berkeley Castle in 1327 with the help of a servant and ultimately retired to become a hermit in the Holy Roman Empire. The body buried at Gloucester Cathedral was said to be that of the porter of Berkeley Castle, killed by the assassins and presented by them to Isabella as Edward's corpse to avoid punishment. The letter is often linked to an account of Edward III meeting with a man called William the Welshman in Antwerp in 1338, who claimed to be Edward II. Some parts of the letter's content are considered broadly accurate by historians, although other aspects of its account have been criticised as implausible. A few historians have supported versions of its narrative. Paul C. Doherty questions the veracity of the letter and the identity of William the Welshman, but nonetheless has suspicions that Edward may have survived his imprisonment. The popular historian Alison Weir believes the events in the letter to be essentially true, using the letter to argue that Isabella was innocent of murdering Edward; and Natalie Fryde has claimed that Edward's survival is "a possibility". The historian Ian Mortimer suggests that the story in Fieschi's letter is broadly accurate, but argues that it was Mortimer and Isabella who had Edward secretly released, and who then faked his death, a fiction later maintained by Edward III when he came to power. Ian Mortimer's account was criticised by most scholars when it was first published, in particular by historian David Carpenter, who argues that there is no "convincing evidence for Edward’s survival, let alone for it being the result of a Mortimer plot". (Note: For a critique of the theory that Edward II survived his imprisonment, see David Carpenter's review in the London Review of Books, and Roy Haines's biography of Edward.) There is no evidence for Edward's death at Berkeley Castle in 1327 except one letter that Thomas de Berkeley, 3rd Baron Berkeley, sent from Berkeley Castle to Edward III, informing him of his father's death. Edward proceeded to announce the death without verifying its truth. Berkeley later, publicly in parliament in 1330, denied having sent the letter.

== Edward as king ==
=== Kingship, government and law ===
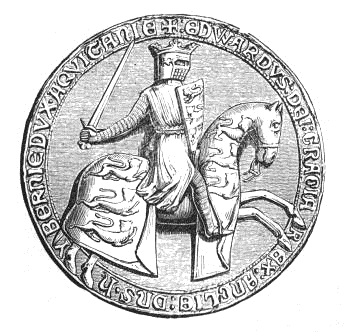
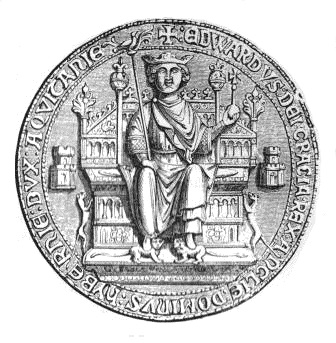
Edward's Great Seal

Edward was ultimately a failure as a king; the historian Michael Prestwich observes that he "was lazy and incompetent, liable to outbursts of temper over unimportant issues, yet indecisive when it came to major issues", echoed by Roy Haines' description of Edward as "incompetent and vicious", and as "no man of business". Edward did not just delegate routine government to his subordinates, but also higher level decision making, and Pierre Chaplais argues that he "was not so much an incompetent king as a reluctant one", preferring to rule through a powerful deputy, such as Piers Gaveston or Hugh Despenser the Younger. Edward's willingness to promote his favourites had serious political consequences, although he also attempted to buy the loyalty of a wider grouping of nobles through grants of money and fees. He could take a keen interest in the minutiae of administration, however, and on occasion engaged in the details of a wide range of issues across England and his wider domains. (Note: Most historians suggest that Edward increased his engagement with administration in the 1320s, although Michael Prestwich suggests that many of Edward's later correspondence on governmental issues were written for him by the Despensers. Generally, current historians have tended to stress Edward's later role in governance, even if he did not necessarily prove to be a competent or successful administrator. Miri Rubin argues that he was "deeply involved" in governance and portrays Edward's abilities sympathetically; Anthony Musson stresses Edward's later involvement in the legal system; Seymour Phillips argues that Edward was more closely involved in governmental business than has been previously suggested, although his interest was "sporadic and unpredictable", and heavily influenced by his advisors; Roy Haines notes Edward's "idiosyncrasy" in engaging in business, and the dominant role of the Despensers in setting policy, but stops short of Prestwich's position.)

One of Edward's persistent challenges through most of his reign was a shortage of money; of the debts he inherited from his father, around £60,000 was still owing in the 1320s. Edward worked his way through many treasurers and other financial officials, few of whom stayed long, raising revenues through often unpopular taxes, and requisitioning goods using his right of prise. He also took out many loans, first through the Frescobaldi family, and then through his banker Antonio Pessagno. Edward took a strong interest in financial matters towards the end of his reign, distrusting his own officials and directly cutting back on the expenses of his own household.

Edward was responsible for implementing royal justice through his network of judges and officials. It is uncertain to what extent Edward took a personal interest in dispensing justice, but he appears to have involved himself to some degree during the first part of his reign, and to have increasingly intervened in person after 1322. Edward made extensive use of Roman civil law during his reign when arguing in defence of his causes and favourites, which may have attracted criticism from those who perceived this as abandoning the established principles of English common law. Edward was also criticised by contemporaries for allowing the Despensers to exploit the royal justice system for their own ends; the Despensers certainly appear to have abused the system, although just how widely is unclear. Amid the political turbulence, armed gangs and violence spread across England under Edward's reign, destabilising the position of many of the local gentry; much of Ireland similarly disintegrated into anarchy.

Under Edward's rule, parliament's importance grew as a means of making political decisions and answering petitions, although as the historian Claire Valente notes, the gatherings were "still as much an event as an institution". After 1311, parliament began to include, in addition to the barons, the representatives of the knights and burgesses, who in later years would constitute the "commons". Although parliament often opposed raising fresh taxes, active opposition to Edward came largely from the barons, rather than parliament itself, although the barons did seek to use the parliamentary meetings as a way of giving legitimacy to their long-standing political demands. After resisting it for many years, Edward began intervening in parliament in the second half of his reign to achieve his own political aims. It remains unclear whether he was deposed in 1327 by a formal gathering of parliament or simply a gathering of the political classes alongside an existing parliament.

=== Court ===
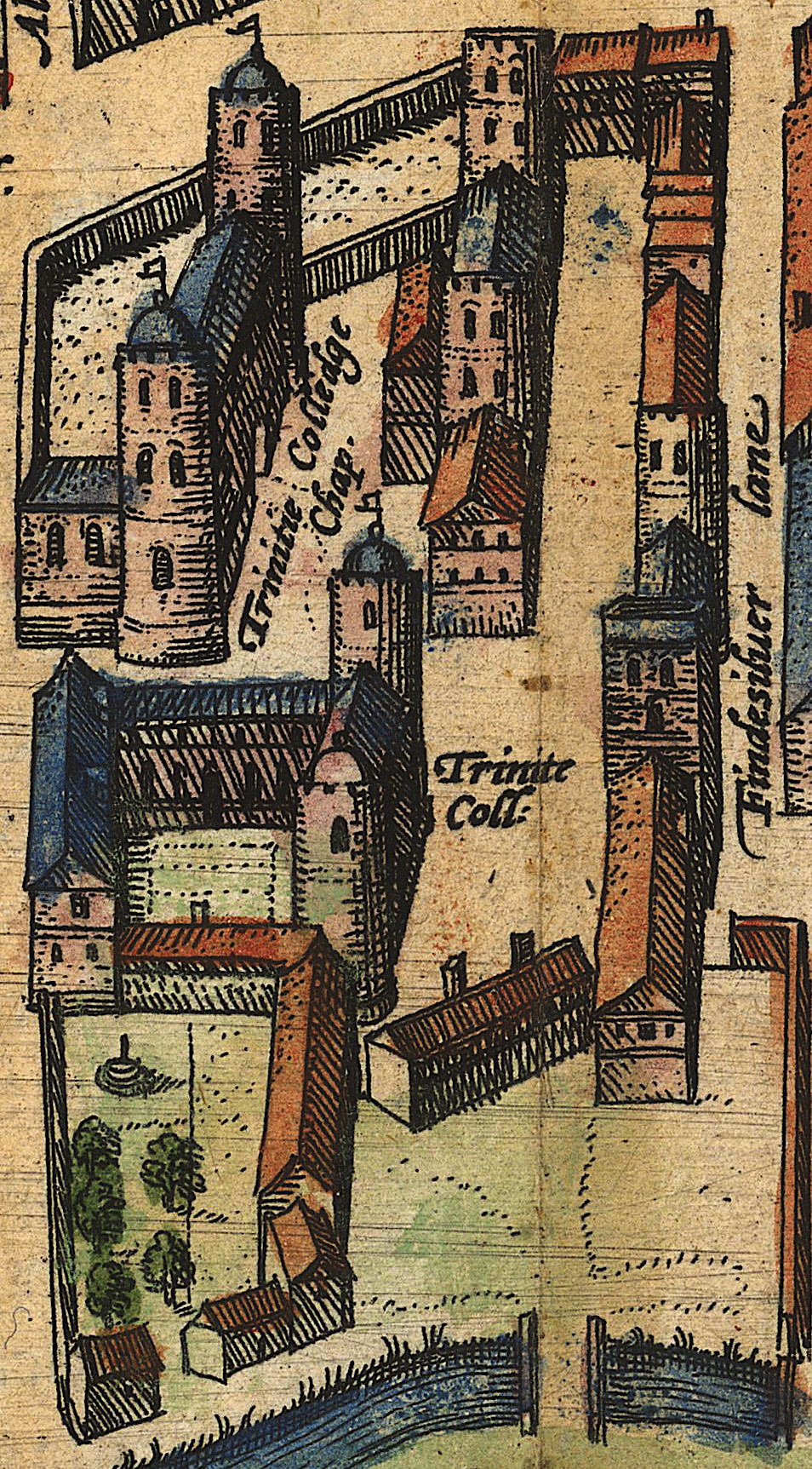
1575 map of Cambridge showing the King's Hall (top left) founded by Edward

Edward's royal court was itinerant, travelling around the country with him. When housed in Westminster Palace, the court occupied a complex of two halls, seven chambers and three chapels, along with other smaller rooms, but, due to the Scottish conflict, the court spent much of its time in Yorkshire and Northumbria. At the heart of the court was Edward's royal household, in turn divided into the "hall" and the "chamber"; the size of the household varied over time, but in 1317 was around five hundred people, including household knights, squires, and kitchen and transport staff. The household was surrounded by a wider group of courtiers, and appears to have also attracted a circle of prostitutes and criminal elements.

Music and minstrels were very popular at Edward's court, but hunting appears to have been a much less important activity, and there was little emphasis on chivalric events. Edward was interested in buildings and paintings, but less so in literary works, which were not extensively sponsored at court. There was an extensive use of gold and silver plates, jewels and enamelling at court, which would have been richly decorated. (Note: Among his more esoteric valuables, Edward had a pitcher, allegedly made from a griffin's egg.) Edward kept a camel as a pet and, as a young man, took a lion with him on campaign to Scotland. The court could be entertained in exotic ways: by an Italian snake-charmer in 1312, and the following year by 54 nude French dancers. (Note: The historian Miri Rubin argues that the displays show a lack of royal decorum. The historian Michael Prestwich notes that these court events imply to many "a decadent extravagance, fitting the familiar stereotype of the king", but goes on to argue that the court was really "conventional, and perhaps even rather dull"; Seymour Phillips questions if the naked French dancers were genuinely extravagant or simply intended to fit in with local French royal culture.)

=== Religion ===
Edward's approach to religion was normal for the period, and the historian Michael Prestwich describes him as "a man of wholly conventional religious attitudes". There were daily chapel services and almsgiving at his court, and Edward blessed the sick, although he did this less often than his predecessors. Edward remained close to the Dominican Order, which had helped to educate him, and followed their advice in asking for papal permission to be anointed with the Holy Oil of St. Thomas of Canterbury in 1319; this request was refused, causing the king some embarrassment. Edward supported the expansion of the universities during his reign, establishing King's Hall in Cambridge to promote training in religious and civil law, Oriel College in Oxford and a short-lived university in Dublin.

Edward enjoyed a good relationship with Pope Clement V, despite the king's repeated intervention in the operation of the English Church, including punishing bishops with whom he disagreed. With Clement's support, Edward attempted to gain the financial support of the English Church for his military campaigns in Scotland, including taxation and borrowing money against the funds gathered for the crusades. The Church did relatively little to influence or moderate Edward's behaviour during his reign, possibly because of the bishops' self-interest and concern for their own protection.

Pope John XXII, elected in 1316, sought Edward's support for a new crusade, and was also inclined to support him politically. In 1317, in exchange for papal support in his war with Scotland, Edward agreed to recommence paying the annual Papal tribute, which had been first agreed to by King John in 1213; Edward soon ceased the payments, however, and never offered his homage, another part of the 1213 agreement. In 1325 Edward asked Pope John to instruct the Irish Church to openly preach in favour of his right to rule the island, and to threaten to excommunicate any contrary voices.

== Legacy ==
=== Historiography ===
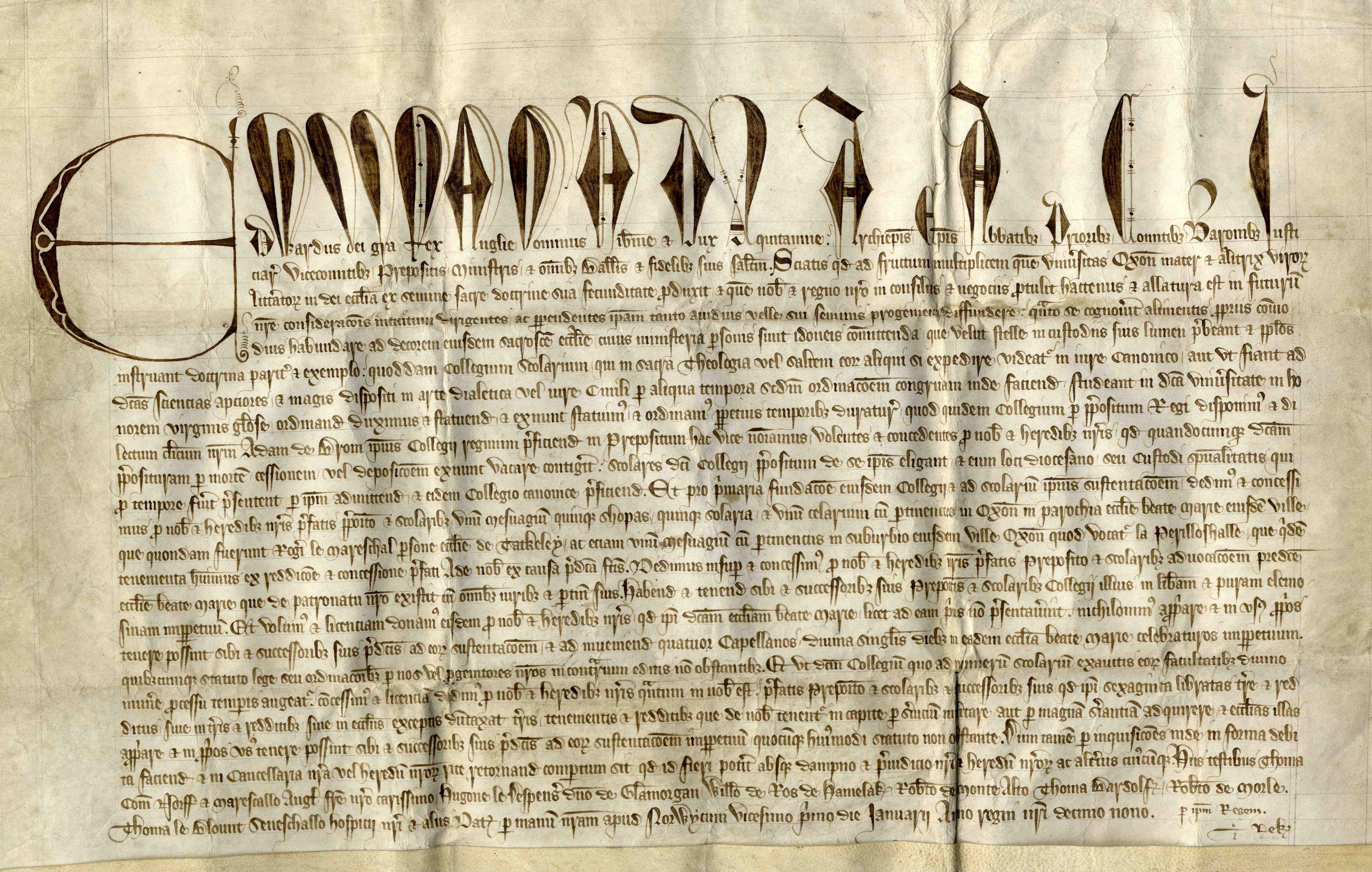
Oriel College's 1326 charter from Edward

No chronicler for this period is entirely trustworthy or unbiased, often because their accounts were written to support a particular cause, but it is clear that most contemporary chroniclers were highly critical of Edward. The Polychronicon, Vita Edwardi Secundi, Vita et Mors Edwardi Secundi and the Gesta Edwardi de Carnarvon for example all condemned the king's personality, habits, and choice of companions. Other records from his reign show criticism by his contemporaries, including the Church and members of his own household. Political songs were written about him, complaining about his failure in war and his oppressive government. Later in the 14th century, some chroniclers, such as Geoffrey le Baker and Thomas Ringstead, rehabilitated Edward, presenting him as a martyr and a potential saint, although this tradition died out in later years.

Historians in the 16th and 17th centuries focused on Edward's relationship with Gaveston, drawing comparisons between Edward's reign and the events surrounding the relationship of Jean Louis de Nogaret de La Valette, Duke of Épernon, and Henry III of France, and between George Villiers, 1st Duke of Buckingham, and Charles I of England. In the first half of the 19th century, popular historians such as Charles Dickens and Charles Knight popularised Edward's life with the Victorian public, focusing on the king's relationship with his favourites and, increasingly, alluding to his possible homosexuality. From the 1870s onwards, open academic discussion of Edward's sexuality was circumscribed by changing English values. By the start of the 20th century, English schools were being advised by the government to avoid overt discussion of Edward's personal relationships in history lessons. Views on his sexuality have continued to develop over the years.

By the end of the 19th century, more administrative records from the period had become available to historians such as William Stubbs, Thomas Tout and J. C. Davies, who focused on the development of the English constitutional and governmental system during his reign. Although critical of what they regarded as Edward II's inadequacies as a king, they also emphasised the growth of the role of parliament and the reduction in personal royal authority under Edward, which they perceived as positive developments. During the 1970s the historiography of Edward's reign shifted away from this model, supported by the further publishing of records from the period in the last quarter of the 20th century. The work of Jeffrey Denton, Jeffrey Hamilton, John Maddicott and Seymour Phillips re-focused attention on the role of the individual leaders in the conflicts. With the exceptions of Hilda Johnstone's work on Edward's early years and Natalie Fryde's study of Edward's final years, the focus of the major historical studies for several years was on the leading magnates rather than Edward himself, until substantial biographies of the king were published by Roy Haines and Seymour Phillips in 2003 and 2011.

=== Cultural references ===
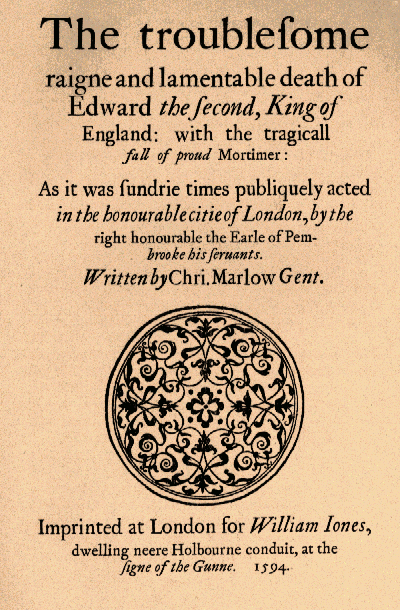
Title page of the earliest published text of Edward II (1594)

Several plays have shaped Edward's contemporary image. Christopher Marlowe's play Edward II was first performed around 1592 and focuses on Edward's relationship with Piers Gaveston, reflecting 16th-century concerns about the relationships between monarchs and their favourites. Marlowe presents Edward's death as a murder, drawing parallels between the killing and martyrdom; although Marlowe does not describe the actual nature of Edward's murder in the script, it has usually been performed following the tradition that Edward was killed with a red-hot poker. The character of Edward in the play, who has been likened to Marlowe's contemporaries James VI of Scotland and Henry III of France, may have influenced William Shakespeare's portrayal of Richard II. In the 17th century, the playwright Ben Jonson picked up the same theme for his unfinished work, Mortimer His Fall.

The filmmaker Derek Jarman adapted the Marlowe play into a film in 1991, creating a postmodern pastiche of the original, depicting Edward as a strong, explicitly homosexual leader, ultimately overcome by powerful enemies. In Jarman's version, Edward finally escapes captivity, following the tradition in the Fieschi letter. Edward's current popular image was also shaped by his contrasting appearance in Mel Gibson's 1995 film Braveheart, where he is portrayed as weak and implicitly homosexual, wearing silk clothes and heavy makeup, shunning the company of women and incapable of dealing militarily with the Scots.

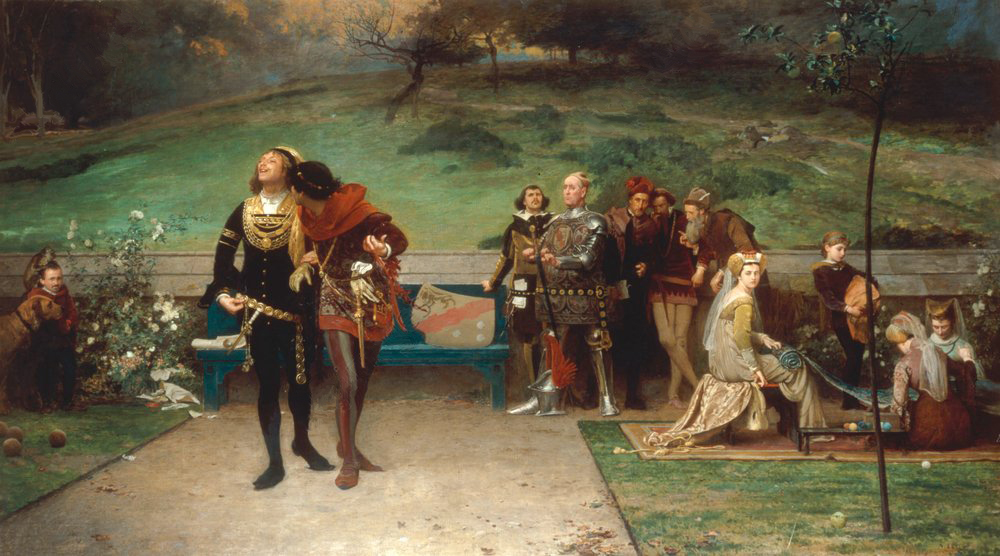
An 1872 painting by English artist Marcus Stone shows Edward II cavorting with Gaveston at left, while nobles and courtiers look on with concern.

Edward's life has also been used in a wide variety of other media. In the Victorian era, the painting Edward II and Piers Gaveston by Marcus Stone strongly hinted at a homosexual relationship between the pair, while avoiding making this aspect explicit. It was initially shown at the Royal Academy in 1872 but was marginalised in later decades as the issue of homosexuality became more sensitive. More recently, the director David Bintley used Marlowe's play as the basis for the ballet Edward II, first performed in 1995; the music from the ballet forms a part of composer John McCabe's symphony Edward II, produced in 2000. Novels such as John Penford's 1984 The Gascon and Chris Hunt's 1992 Gaveston have focused on the sexual aspects of Edward and Gaveston's relationship, while Stephanie Merritt's 2002 Gaveston transports the story into the 20th century.

== Issue ==
Edward's coat of arms as king

Edward II had four children with Isabella:

1. Edward III of England (13 November 1312 – 21 June 1377). Married Philippa of Hainault on 24 January 1328. They had eight sons and five daughters.
2. John of Eltham (15 August 1316 – 13 September 1336). Died aged 20. Never married. No issue.
3. Eleanor of Woodstock (18 June 1318 – 22 April 1355). Married Reinoud II of Guelders in May 1332 and had two sons.
4. Joan of the Tower (5 July 1321 – 7 September 1362). Married David II of Scotland on 17 July 1328 and became Queen of Scots, but had no issue.

Edward also fathered the illegitimate Adam FitzRoy (c. 1307–1322), who accompanied his father in the Scottish campaigns of 1322 and died shortly afterwards.

== Ancestry ==
Ancestors of Edward II of England

8. John, King of England
4. Henry III, King of England
9. Isabella, Countess of Angoulême
2. Edward I, King of England
10. Ramon Berenguer IV, Count of Provence
5. Eleanor of Provence
11. Beatrice of Savoy
1. Edward II, King of England
12. Alfonso IX, King of León
6. Ferdinand III, King of Castile
13. Berengaria, Queen of Castile
3. Eleanor, Countess of Ponthieu
14. Simon, Count of Ponthieu
7. Joan, Countess of Ponthieu
15. Marie, Countess of Ponthieu

== See also ==
- History of same-sex relationships, specifically the note on historiographical considerations
- List of earls in the reign of Edward II of England

== Bibliography ==
- Aberth, John (2003). A Knight at the Movies: Medieval history on film. London: Routledge. ISBN 978-0-4159-3885-3.
- Alexander, James W. (1985). "A Historiographical Survey: Norman and Plantagenet Kings since World War II". Journal of British Studies. 24 (1): 94–109. doi:10.1086/385826. ISSN 0021-9371. S2CID 154988120.
- Ashbee, Jeremy (2007). Conwy Castle. Cardiff, UK: Cadw. ISBN 978-1-8576-0259-3.
- Brintnell, Kent L. (2011). Ecce Homo: The male-body-in-pain as redemptive figure. Chicago, US: University of Chicago Press. ISBN 978-0-2260-7471-9.
- Brown, Elizabeth A. R. (1988). "The Political Repercussions of Family Ties in the Early Fourteenth Century: The Marriage of Edward II of England and Isabelle of France". Speculum. 63 (3): 573–595. doi:10.2307/2852635. ISSN 0038-7134. JSTOR 2852635. S2CID 154858717.
- Burden, Joel (2004). "Re-writing a Rite of Passage: The Peculiar Funeral of Edward II". In McDonald, Nicola; Ormrod, W. Mark (eds.). Rites of Passage: Cultures of Transition in the Fourteenth Century. Woodbridge, UK: York Medieval Press. pp. 13–30. ISBN 978-1-9031-5315-4.
- Burgtorf, Jochen (2008). "'With my life, his joyes began and ended': Piers Gaveston and King Edward II of England Revisited". In Saul, Nigel (ed.). Fourteenth Century England. Vol. V. Woodbridge, UK: The Boydell Press. pp. 31–51. ISBN 978-1-8438-3387-1.
- Carpenter, David (2004). The Struggle for Mastery: The Penguin History of Britain 1066–1284. London: Penguin. ISBN 978-0-1401-4824-4. OL 7348814M.
- Chaplais, Pierre (1994). Piers Gaveston: Edward II's Adoptive Brother. Oxford University Press. ISBN 978-0-1982-0449-7.
- Childs, Wendy R. (1991). "'Welcome My Brother': Edward II, John of Powderham and the Chronicles, 1318". In Wood, Ian; Loud, G. A. (eds.). Church and Chronicle in the Middle Ages: Essays Presented to John Taylor. London: Hambledon Press. pp. 149–164. ISBN 978-0-8264-6938-0. OL 8976202M.
- Coote, Lesley Ann (2000). Prophecy and Public Affairs in Later Medieval England. Woodbridge, UK: York Medieval Press. ISBN 978-1-9031-5303-1.
- Dodd, Gwilym; Musson, Anthony (2006). The Reign of Edward II: New Perspectives. Woodbridge, UK: York Medieval Press. ISBN 978-1-9031-5319-2. OL 17882067M.
  —— (2006). Parliament and Political Legitimacy in the Reign of Edward II. pp. 165–189. in Dodd & Musson 2006.
- Doherty, Paul (2004). Isabella and the Strange Death of Edward II. London: Robinson. ISBN 978-1-8411-9843-9.
- Duffy, Mark (2003). Royal Tombs of Medieval England. Stroud, UK: Tempus. ISBN 978-0-7524-2579-5.
- Durand, Ursin; Clémencet, Charles; Dantine, Maur-François (1818). L'art de verifier les dates des faits historiques, des chartes, des chroniques et autres anciens monuments depuis la naissance de notre-seigneur (in French). Vol. 12. Paris, France: n.p. OCLC 221519473.
- Galbraith, Vivian Hunter (1935). "The literacy of the medieval English kings". Proceedings of the British Academy. 21: 78–111. ISSN 0068-1202.
- Given-Wilson, Chris (1996). The English Nobility in the Late Middle Ages: The fourteenth-century political community. London: Routledge. ISBN 978-0-4151-4883-2.
- Haines, Roy Martin (2003). King Edward II: His life, his reign and its aftermath, 1284–1330. Montreal, Canada and Kingston, Canada: McGill-Queen's University Press. ISBN 978-0-7735-3157-4.
- Hallam, Elizabeth M.; Everard, Judith A. (2001). Capetian France, 987–1328 (2nd ed.). Harlow, UK: Longman. ISBN 978-0-5824-0428-1.
- Hamilton, J. S. (1991). "Piers Gaveston and the royal treasure". Albion: A Quarterly Journal Concerned with British Studies. 23 (2): 201–207. doi:10.2307/4050602. ISSN 0095-1390. JSTOR 4050602.
  —— (2006). The Character of Edward II: The letters of Edward of Caernarfon reconsidered. pp. 5–21. in Dodd & Musson 2006.
  —— (2010). The Plantagenets: History of a Dynasty. London: Continuum. ISBN 978-1-4411-5712-6.
- Horne, Peter (1999). "The besotted King and his Adonis: Representations of Edward II and Gaveston in late nineteenth-century England". History Workshop Journal. 47 (47): 30–48. doi:10.1093/hwj/1999.47.30. ISSN 1477-4569. PMID 11623897.
- Jordan, William Chester (1996). The Great Famine: Northern Europe in the early fourteenth century. Princeton, US: Princeton University Press. ISBN 978-0-6910-5891-7.
- Lawrence, Martyn (2006). Rise of a Royal Favourite: The Early Career of Hugh Despenser. pp. 204–219. in Dodd & Musson 2006.
- Logan, Robert A. (2007). Shakespeare's Marlowe: The influence of Christopher Marlowe on Shakespeare's artistry. Aldershot, UK: Ashgate. ISBN 978-1-4094-8974-0. OL 10852938M.
- Marshall, Alison (2006). The childhood and household of Edward II's half-brothers, Thomas of Brotherton and Edmund of Woodstock. pp. 190–204. in Dodd & Musson 2006.
- Martin, Matthew R. (2010). "Introduction". In Martin, Matthew R. (ed.). Edward the Second, by Christopher Marlowe. Ontario, Canada: Broadview Press. pp. 9–32. ISBN 978-1-7704-8120-6.
- McKisack, M. (1959). The Fourteenth Century: 1307–1399. Oxford University Press. OCLC 19375615.
- Menache, Sophia (2002). Clement V. Cambridge, UK: Cambridge University Press. ISBN 978-0-5215-9219-2.
- Mortimer, Ian (2004). The Greatest Traitor: The life of Sir Roger Mortimer, ruler of England 1327–1330. London: Pimlico. ISBN 978-0-7126-9715-6.
  —— (2005). "The Death of Edward II in Berkeley Castle". English Historical Review. 120 (489): 1175–1224. doi:10.1093/ehr/cei329. ISSN 0013-8266.
  —— (2006). Sermons of sodomy: A reconsideration of Edward II's sodomitical reputation. pp. 48–60. in Dodd & Musson 2006.
  —— (2008). The Perfect King: The life of Edward III, father of the English nation. London: Vintage. ISBN 978-0-0995-2709-1.
- Musson, Anthony (2006). Edward II: The public and private faces of the law. pp. 140–164. in Dodd & Musson 2006.
- O'Callaghan, Joseph F. (1975). A History of Medieval Spain. Ithaca, US: Cornell University Press. ISBN 978-0-8014-0880-9.
- Ormrod, W. Mark (2004). "Monarchy, Martyrdom and Masculinity: England in the Later Middle Ages". In Cullum, P. H.; Lewis, Katherine J. (eds.). Holiness and Masculinity in the Middle Ages. Cardiff, UK: University of Wales Press. pp. 174–191. ISBN 978-0-7083-1894-2.
  —— (2006). The Sexualities of Edward II. pp. 22–47. in Dodd & Musson 2006.
  —— (2011). Edward III. New Haven, US: Yale University Press. ISBN 978-0-3001-1910-7.
- Perry, Curtis (2000). "The politics of access and representations of the sodomite king in early modern England". Renaissance Quarterly. 53 (4): 1054–1083. doi:10.2307/2901456. ISSN 1935-0236. JSTOR 2901456. S2CID 155958161.
- Phillips, Seymour (2006). The Place of the Reign of Edward II. pp. 220–233. in Dodd & Musson 2006.
  —— (2011). Edward II. New Haven, CT & London: Yale University Press. ISBN 978-0-3001-7802-9.
- Prasch, Thomas (1993). "Edward II". American Historical Review. 98 (4): 1164–1166. doi:10.2307/2166608. ISSN 0002-8762. JSTOR 2166608.
- Prestwich, Michael (1997). Edward I (new ed.). New Haven, Connecticut: Yale University Press. ISBN 978-0-300-07157-3.
  —— (2003). The Three Edwards: War and state in England, 1272–1377 (2nd ed.). London & New York, NY: Routledge. ISBN 978-0-4153-0309-5.
  —— (2006). The court of Edward II. pp. 61–76. in Dodd & Musson 2006.
  —— (2007). Plantagenet England: 1225–1360. Oxford University Press. ISBN 978-0-1992-2687-0.
  —— (2008). "Edward I (1239–1307)". Oxford Dictionary of National Biography. Oxford University Press. doi:10.1093/ref:odnb/8517. (subscription, Wikipedia Library access or UK public library membership required)
- Ruddick, Andrea (2013). English Identity and Political Culture in the Fourteenth Century. Cambridge, UK: Cambridge University Press. ISBN 978-1-1070-0726-0.
- Rubin, Miri (2006). The Hollow Crown: A history of Britain in the late Middle Ages. London: Penguin. ISBN 978-0-1401-4825-1. OL 18287761M.
- Schofield, Phillipp R. (2005). "King Edward II: Edward of Caernarfon, his life, his reign, and its aftermath, 1284–1330 by Roy Martin Haines". Speculum (book review). 80 (4): 1295–1296. doi:10.1017/s0038713400001780. ISSN 0038-7134.
- Smallwood, M. (1973). "The Lament of Edward II". Modern Language Review. 68 (3): 521–529. doi:10.2307/3724989. ISSN 0026-7937. JSTOR 3724989.
- Tebbit, Alistair (2003). "Royal patronage and political allegiance: The household knights of Edward II, 1314–1321". In Prestwich, Michael; Britnell, Richard; Frame, Robin (eds.). Thirteenth Century England. The Durham Conference. Proceedings of the Durham Conference. Vol. X. Durham, UK: The Boydell Press. pp. 197–209. ISBN 978-1-8438-3122-8.
- Waugh, Scott L. (1991). England in the Reign of Edward III. Cambridge, UK: Cambridge University Press. ISBN 978-0-5213-1039-0. OL 1850113M.
- Weir, Alison (2006). Isabella: She-wolf of France, Queen of England. London: Pimlico. ISBN 978-0-7126-4194-4.
- Valente, Claire (1998). "The deposition and abdication of Edward II". The English Historical Review. 113 (453): 852–881. doi:10.1093/ehr/cxiii.453.852. ISSN 0013-8266.
  —— (2002). "The 'Lament of Edward II': Religious lyric, political propaganda". Speculum. 77 (2): 422–439. doi:10.2307/3301327. ISSN 0038-7134. JSTOR 3301327. S2CID 154602148.

Edward II House of Plantagenet Born: 25 April 1284 Died: 21 September 1327
Regnal titles
Preceded by Edward I	King of England; Lord of Ireland; 1307–1327	Succeeded by Edward III
Preceded by Edward I	Duke of Aquitaine; 1306–1325	Succeeded by Edward III
Preceded by Eleanor and Edward I	Count of Ponthieu; 1290–1325	Succeeded by Edward III
English royalty
Vacant Title last held by Welsh title: Dafydd ap Gruffudd (1283)	Prince of Wales; 1301–1307	Vacant Title next held by English title: Edward, the Black Prince
