= List of earls in the reign of Edward II of England =

The following individuals were Earls (suo jure or jure uxoris) or Countesses (suo jure) during the reign of King Edward II of England who reigned from 1307 to 1327.

The period of tenure as Earl or Countess is given after the name and title of each individual, including any period of minority.

- Earl of Arundel
  - Edmund FitzAlan, 9th Earl of Arundel (1302–1326)
- Earl of Carlisle
  - Andrew Harclay, 1st Earl of Carlisle (1322–1323)
- Earl of Chester
  - Edward of Windsor, Earl of Chester (1312–1327)
- Earl of Cornwall
  - Piers Gaveston, 1st Earl of Cornwall (1308–1312)
- Earl of Derby
  - Thomas, 2nd Earl of Lancaster (1296–1322)
- Earl of Essex
  - Humphrey de Bohun, 4th Earl of Hereford, 3rd Earl of Essex (1298–1322)
  - John de Bohun, 5th Earl of Hereford, 4th Earl of Essex (1322–1336)
- Earl of Gloucester
  - Ralph de Monthermer, 1st Baron Monthermer, Earl of Gloucester jure uxoris (1295–1307)
  - Gilbert de Clare, 8th Earl of Gloucester, (1308–1314)
- Earl of Hereford
  - Humphrey de Bohun, 4th Earl of Hereford (1298–1322)
  - John de Bohun, 5th Earl of Hereford (1322–1336)
- Earl of Hertford
  - Ralph de Monthermer, 1st Baron Monthermer, Earl of Hertford jure uxoris (1295–1307)
  - Gilbert de Clare, 8th Earl of Gloucester, 7th Earl of Hertford (1308–1314)
- Earl of Kent
  - Edmund of Woodstock, 1st Earl of Kent (1321–1330)
- Earl of Lancaster
  - Thomas, 2nd Earl of Lancaster (1296–1322)
  - Henry, 3rd Earl of Lancaster (1327–1345)
- Earl of Leicester
  - Thomas, 2nd Earl of Lancaster, 2nd Earl of Leicester (1296–1322)
  - Henry, 3rd Earl of Lancaster, 3rd Earl of Leicester (1324–1345)
- Earl of Lincoln
  - Henry de Lacy, 3rd Earl of Lincoln (1272–1311)
  - Alice de Lacy, 4th Countess of Lincoln suo jure (1311–1348)
- Earl of Norfolk
  - Thomas of Brotherton, 1st Earl of Norfolk (1312–1338)
- Earl of Oxford
  - Robert de Vere, 6th Earl of Oxford (1296–1331)
- Earl of Pembroke
  - Aymer de Valence, 2nd Earl of Pembroke (1296–1324)
- Earl of Richmond
  - John of Brittany, Earl of Richmond (1306–1334)
- Earl of Salisbury
  - Margaret Longespée, 4th Countess of Salisbury suo jure (1261–1310)
  - Alice de Lacy, 5th Countess of Salisbury suo jure (1310–1322)
- Earl of Surrey
  - John de Warenne, 7th Earl of Surrey (1304–1347)
- Earl of Warwick
  - Guy de Beauchamp, 10th Earl of Warwick (1298–1315)
  - Thomas de Beauchamp, 11th Earl of Warwick (1315–1369)
- Earl of Winchester
  - Hugh le Despenser, 1st Earl of Winchester (1322–1326)

== Sources ==
- Ellis, Geoffrey. (1963) Earldoms in Fee: A Study in Peerage Law and History. London: The Saint Catherine Press, Limited.
