= Adam (son of Edward II) =

English king's illegitimate son (1307–1322)

- Born: c. 1307
- Died: 18 September 1322 (aged 14–15)
- Buried: 30 September 1322; Tynemouth Priory
- Father: Edward II of England

Adam (c. 1307 – 18 September 1322) was an illegitimate son of King Edward II of England. The identity of Adam's mother is not known. He accompanied his father in the Scottish campaigns of 1322, and died shortly afterwards on 18 September 1322.

Adam is named as Ade filio domini Regis bastardo ("Adam, bastard son of the lord king") in Edward II's Wardrobe account of 1322. Between 6 June and 18 September that year, Adam was given a total of thirteen pounds and twenty-two pence to buy himself "equipment and other necessaries" (armatura et alia necessaria) to take part in Edward's Scottish campaign that autumn. This suggests he was somewhere in his teens, born between about 1303 and 1309.

The money was paid in five instalments, either to Adam directly or to his 'magister' (tutor) Hugh Chastilloun. Adam died during the campaign, of unknown causes, and was buried at Tynemouth Priory on 30 September 1322; his father paid for a silk cloth with gold thread to be placed over his body.

No other references to Adam have yet been discovered.

Adam's identity as the son of Edward II is not certain without a doubt. Medieval records sometimes used “son of the king” loosely for wards or royal dependents. It's also possible, though unlikely, that Adam was the bastard son of a previous king.

== Sources ==
- Seymour Phillips, Edward II (2010), pp. 102, 428–9
- F.D. Blackley, "Adam, the bastard son of Edward II", Bulletin of the Institute of Historical Research, xxxvii (1964), pp. 76–7.
- British Library Stowe MS 553.
