= Feast of the Swans =

14th-century historical event in England

The Feast of the Swans was a chivalric celebration of the knighting of 267 men at Westminster Abbey on Whitsunday in 1306. It followed a proclamation by Edward I that all esquires eligible for knighthood should come to Westminster to be knighted in turn by their future king, and to march with him against the Scots. The King first knighted his son Edward, Prince of Wales, who in turn knighted the 266 others.

At the feast that followed the king had two swans brought in. He swore before God and the swans to avenge the murder of John III Comyn, Lord of Badenoch and the desecration of Greyfriars Church in Dumfries by the Earl of Carrick Robert Bruce and his accomplices earlier in the year, and to fight the infidels in the Holy Land. Among those knighted were Piers Gaveston, Hugh le Despenser, John de Warenne, 7th Earl of Surrey, Roger Mortimer, 1st Earl of March and his uncle, Roger Mortimer of Chirk.

The event was dramatised in the 2018 film Outlaw King, substituting Prince Edward for his father with regards to swearing on the swans.

== See also ==
- Category:People knighted at the Feast of the Swans
