= Natalie Fryde =

British medievalist

Natalie M. Fryde is an historian of medieval England. Her areas of scholarship include Angevin England, King Edward II, and Magna Carta.

Her writing on Magna Carta has been described as "a new look". Her writing about the last portion of Edward II's reign was described as combining "a reappraisal of financial policy with an examination of the activities of the Despensers, neither of whom has yet found a biographer".

== Selected publications ==
- Fryde, Natalie M. (November 1971). "John Stratford, Bishop of Winchester, and the Crown, 1323–30". Historical Research. 44 (110). Blackwell Publishing Ltd: 153–161. doi:10.1111/j.1468-2281.1971.tb02062.x. ISSN 1468-2281.
- Fryde, Natalie M. (1975). "Edward III's Removal of his Ministers and Judges, 1340–1". Historical Research. 48 (118). Blackwell Publishing Ltd: 149–161. doi:10.1111/j.1468-2281.1975.tb00747.x. ISSN 1468-2281.
- The Tyranny and fall of Edward II 1321–1326. Cambridge: Cambridge University Press. 1979. ISBN 9780521222013.
- Why Magna Carta? Angevin England revisited. Münster: Lit Verlag. 2001. ISBN 9783825856571.
