= Pierre Chaplais =

French historian

Pierre Théophile Victorien Marie Chaplais (8 July 1920 – 26 November 2006) was a French historian. He was Reader in Diplomatic at the University of Oxford from 1957 to 1987.

Born in Châteaubriant, Loire-Inférieure (now Loire-Atlantique), France, Chaplais was educated at the Collège Saint-Sauveur in Redon and the University of Rennes, where he studied Law and Classics, with a view of becoming an academic lawyer. His education was interrupted by World War II, during which he served with the French Army until the 1940 Armistice. A member of the French Resistance, Chaplais was captured by the Gestapo and sent to Buchenwald. For his wartime activities he received the Médaille de la Résistance.

After the war Chaplais completed his education at Rennes and was admitted as an avocat. He then began a thesis on Anglo-French relations during 1259–1453 at the University of Paris. In 1946 he travelled to London to conduct research in the Public Record Office. There, under the influence of V. H. Galbraith, he registered for a PhD at the University of London instead. From 1948 to 1955 he was an editor for the Public Record Office, where he worked on the publication of treaty rolls. In 1955 he was elected Reader in Diplomatic at the University of Oxford, succeeding to Kathleen Major. In 1964 he was elected a professorial fellow of Wadham College, Oxford. He retired in 1987.
