= Bonne of Bourbon =

Countess of Savoy (1341–1402)

- The seal of Bonne

Countess consort of Savoy
- Tenure: 1355–1383
- Born: 1341
- Died: 19 January 1402 (aged 60–61); Château de Mâcon
- Spouse: Amadeus VI of Savoy
- Issue: Amadeus VII of Savoy; 2 died young
- House: Bourbon
- Father: Peter I, Duke of Bourbon
- Mother: Isabella of Valois

Bonne of Bourbon (1341 – 19 January 1402) was Countess of Savoy by marriage to Amadeus VI of Savoy. She served as regent of Savoy on several occasions: during her husband's absence from 1366 to 1367, jointly with her son in 1383, and finally during the minority of her grandson, Amadeus VIII, Duke of Savoy, from 1391 to 1395.

== Biography ==
Bonne was the daughter of Peter I, Duke of Bourbon, and Isabella of Valois. She was engaged to Amadeus VI, Count of Savoy as part of the Treaty of Paris (1355), which included a dowry of three thousand florins per year. She married Amadeus in September 1355 in Paris. Immediately after their wedding, her husband had to return to his army, still engaged in the Hundred Years' War.

=== First regency ===
In 1366, when her husband departed on a crusade to Bulgaria, he appointed Bonne as regent of Savoy for the duration of his absence, with the advice of his council.

In 1367, James, Lord of Piedmont, a cousin of Amadeus, died, leading to a succession dispute between his eldest son, Philip, and his widow, Margaret of Beaujeu, who acted on behalf of her young sons, Amadeus and Louis. As regent, Bonne was able to prevent the conflict from escalating into open warfare, but she was unable to resolve the dispute. Philip ultimately had to seek resolution from Amadeus in Venice.

She greatly enjoyed the Alpine mountain lakes of Savoy, and tried to ensure the castles she stayed in had good views of them. In 1371, she oversaw the building of the chateau at Ripaille, seeking to build a manor that would more easily accommodate the larger court of the Count. The new chateau had large windows overlooking Lake Geneva. She was a great patron of music, and was known for her skill on the harp.

In July 1382, funds were running low for her husband's ongoing wars in Italy, so she sold some of her jewelry for more than 400 florins to help him re-equip.

=== Second regency ===
In 1383, when her husband, Amadeus VI, died, he left a will granting his wife power over the government of Savoy despite their son, Amadeus VII, being in his early twenties. With the support of the Council, led by Louis de Cossonay and composed of several of her allies, such as Otton de Grandson, Bonne governed Savoy in her son's name. According to Max Bruchet, one of the fears of the Council in those days was the growing influence of French princes over Savoy: the Duke of Berry had married his daughter to Amadeus VII and his grandson, Amadeus VIII, would one day rule Savoy. The young Amadeus was also betrothed to Mary, the daughter of Philip II, the Duke of Burgundy. Both princes had been younger brothers of Charles V, the King of France, and were now acting as regents for their nephew, Charles VI.

=== Third regency ===
When Amadeus VII died of tetanus in 1391, and Bonne became regent. Her influence over Savoy came to an end when Amadeus VII's doctor (widely seen to have been responsible for the Count's death) accused the Countess of ordering her son's death in 1395. The Dukes of Berry and Burgundy also accused several members of the Count's Council of being complicit in the murder and Bonne was relieved of the regency and of caring for her grandson, the new Count Amadeus VIII.

Bonne died at the Château de Mâcon.

== Issue ==
She and Amadeus had three children:

- A daughter, born 1358, who died after a few weeks
- Amadeus VII of Savoy (March 1360 – November 1, 1391). He married Bonne of Berry (1365–1435), daughter of Duke John of Berry and a niece of Bonne of Bourbon.
- Louis of Savoy, born late 1364, died before the end of the year

== Ancestry ==
Ancestors of Bonne of Bourbon

16. Louis IX of France
8. Robert, Count of Clermont
17. Marguerite of Provence
4. Louis I, Duke of Bourbon
18. John of Burgundy
9. Beatrix of Bourbon
19. Agnes of Dampierre
2. Peter I, Duke of Bourbon
20. John I of Avesnes
10. John II, Count of Holland
21. Adelaide of Holland
5. Mary of Avesnes
22. Henry V of Luxembourg
11. Philippa of Luxembourg
23. Marguerite of Bar
1. Bonne of Bourbon
24. Louis IX of France (= 16)
12. Philip III of France
25. Marguerite of Provence (= 17)
6. Charles of Valois
26. James I of Aragon
13. Isabella of Aragon
27. Violant of Hungary
3. Isabella of Valois
28. Guy III, Count of Saint-Pol
14. Guy IV, Count of Saint-Pol
29. Matilda of Brabant
7. Mahaut of Châtillon
30. John II, Duke of Brittany
15. Marie of Brittany
31. Beatrice of England

== Sources ==
- Autrand, Françoise (1994). Charles V (in French). Fayard.
- Cox, Eugene L. (1967). The Green Count of Savoy. Princeton, New Jersey: Princeton University Press. LCCN 67-11030.
- Echols, Anne; Williams, Marty (1992). An Annotated Index of Medieval Women. Markus Weiner Publishing Inc.

Preceded by Yolande Palaeologina of Montferrat	Countess of Savoy; 1355–1383	Succeeded by Bonne of Berry
