= John of Brittany (disambiguation) =

John of Brittany was Earl of Richmond.

John of Brittany may also refer to:

- John I, Duke of Brittany
- John II, Duke of Brittany
- John III, Duke of Brittany
