= Fontevraud Gradual =

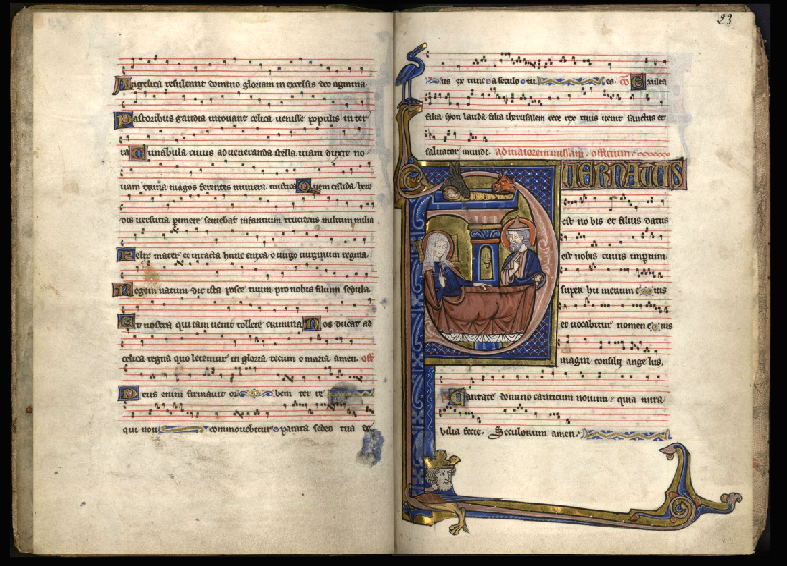
- Artist: Anonymous (presumably Nicolas Lombard)
- Year: 1250s
- Medium: Illuminated manuscript
- Designation: MS 2
- Location: Bibliothèque francophone multimédia, Limoges
- Website: graduel-bfm.limoges.fr

The Fontevraud Gradual (often known as the Gradual of Eleanor of Brittany) is an antiphonary or gradual of the mid-13th century, owned by Eleanor of Brittany (d. 1342), abbess of Fontevraud Abbey, and bequeathed to the abbey on her death. It contains Gregorian chant as well as three early polyphonic pieces. It is also noted for its miniatures in the form of historiated initials.

The manuscript is kept at the Limoges municipal library (Limoges MS 2) and is not publicly accessible. A digital version was made accessible online in 2019.

== History ==
The gradual was made in Paris in the 1250s, perhaps in the studio of Nicolas Lombard. Richard and Mary Rouse attribute the manuscript to one of the four artists who produced a glossy bible commissioned by Guy de La Tour du Pin, bishop of Clermont from 1250 to 1285. Its patrons may have been John II, Duke of Brittany and Beatrice of England, Eleanor's parents. It would have been entrusted to their daughter in 1290 when she arrived at the abbey. Eleanor became an abbess in 1304. The coat of arms of the abbess appears on the edges, but is later than the manuscript. When she died in 1342, she left the gradual to the abbey.

In 1387, Pascal Hugonot, abbot of Saint-Pierre de la Couture in Le Mans, donated the gradual to the collegiate church of Saint-Junien in Haute-Vienne. Father Joseph Nadaud studied it there in the middle of the 18th century. During the French Revolution and its seizure of religious property, the gradual was deposited in Limoges.

== Contents ==
The gradual is unconventional, with a rich and original iconography. It consists of 301 folia. Each page contains ten or eleven lines of music and text. The music is noted in black square notes on a staff of four red lines. The text is adorned with golden and coloured decorated initials.

=== Music ===
The gradual contains pieces of Gregorian chant, as well as its own repertoire: sequences, proses, readings and three polyphonic pieces with two voices: Res est admirabilis (sequence), Verbum bonum (sequence) and a Credo.

In 1993, an interpretation of parts of the gradual was recorded by Ensemble Organum in the refectory of the abbey. Another interpretation was recorded by the Choeur grégorien du Mans in 2000.

=== Illustrations ===
Many miniatures, in the form of large historiated initials, relate events of the life of Christ such as the Nativity, the Adoration of the Magi, and the Resurrection. They also include images of saints such as Saint Lawrence or Radegund. These are large initials that sometimes occupy almost half the page. The words they begin are written in golden capitals which span the width of the page.

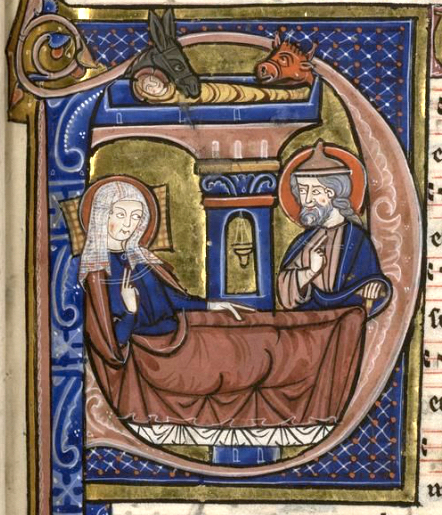
Nativity

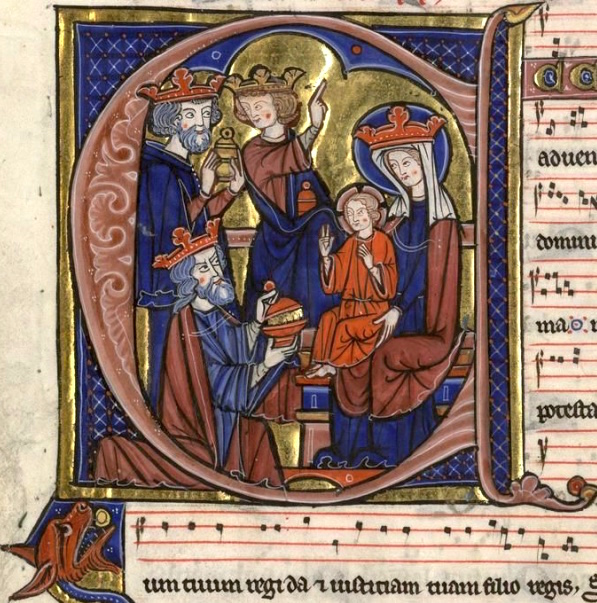
Adoration of the Magi

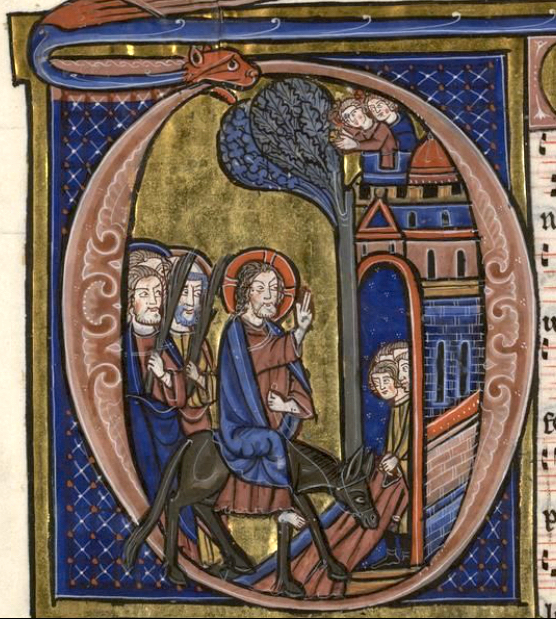
Entry into Jerusalem

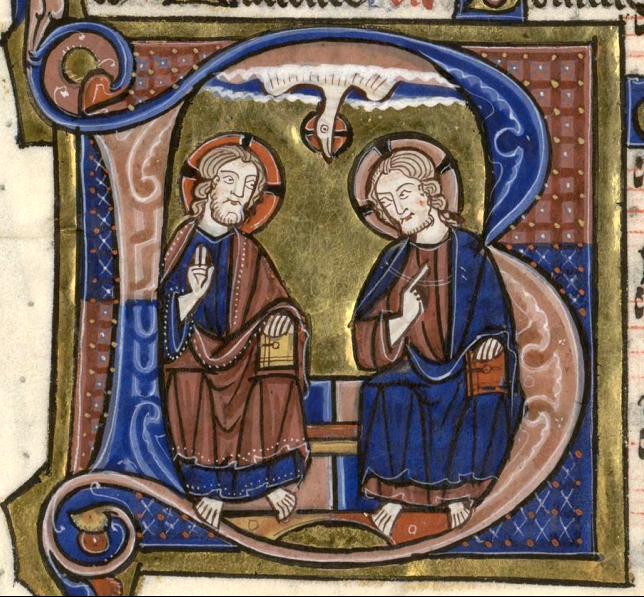
Trinity

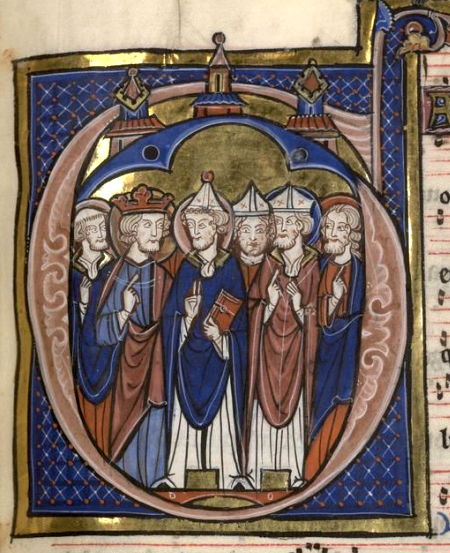
All Saints

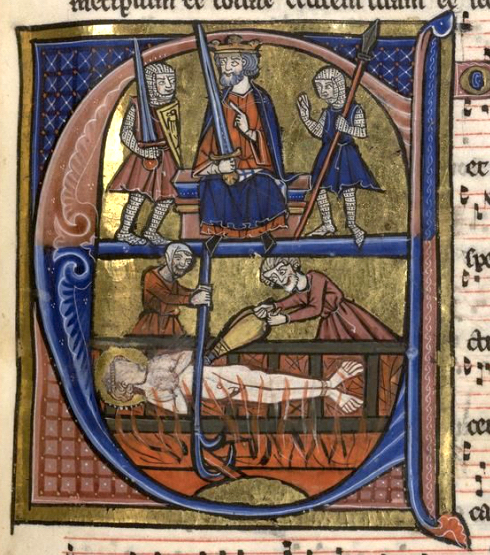
Saint Lawrence

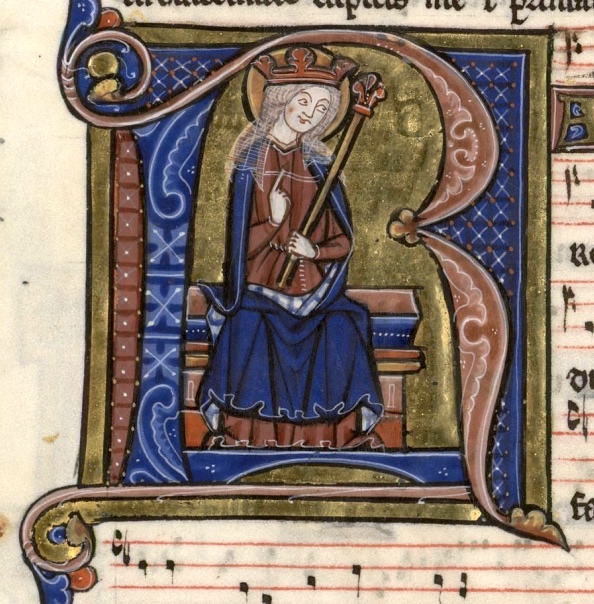
Radegund

=== Farced epistles ===
The document also contains several farced epistles. These are readings from the Mass in which the text of Scripture is provided, verse after verse, either with a Latin paraphrase or with a translation in the vernacular. The paraphrase or translation constitutes the 'farce' of the scriptural text. The farce usually takes a versified and musical form. The gradual contains five troped epistles, starting at folios 29, 46v, 272, 274 and 278. The epistle starting at fol. 29 is a farced epistle of Saint Stephen (from December 26).
