= Scott L. Waugh =

American historian and academic administrator

- Born: April 27, 1948 (age 78)
- Education: University of California, Los Angeles; University of London
- Occupations: Historian, academic administrator

Scott L. Waugh (born April 27, 1948) is an American historian and academic administrator. He is professor of history at the University of California, Los Angeles (UCLA), where he also served as executive vice chancellor and provost. He was an early supporter of Chicano Studies at UCLA. He is the author of two widely reviewed books about the Middle Ages, and the co-editor of a third book.

== Early life ==
Waugh graduated from the University of California, Los Angeles with a Bachelor of Arts degree in history in 1970. He was awarded a PhD in history from the University of London in 1975.

== Career ==
Waugh joined the department of history at UCLA in 1975. He is professor of history. He is the author of two books about the Middle Ages in England.

Waugh's first book, The Lordship of England: Royal Wardships and Marriages in English Society and Politics, 1217–1327, published in 1988, was reviewed by John Maddicott in Albion, by J. R. S. Phillips in The English Historical Review, by Richard W. Kaeuper in Speculum, and by Robert Bartlett in the Journal of British Studies.

Waugh's second book, England in the Reign of Edward III, published in 1991, was reviewed by Professor Ruth Mazo Karras of the University of Minnesota in Albion, by Anthony Goodman in History, by Ian Dawson in Teaching History, by James W. Alexander in Speculum, by Professor Stephen H. Rigby of the University of Manchester in The Economic History Review, by Professor Robert C. Stacey of the University of Washington in The Journal of Economic History, by Professor Kurt-Ulrich Jäschke of Saarland University in Historische Zeitschrift, and by Simon Walker in The English Historical Review.

With Peter D. Diehl, Waugh co-edited Christendom and Its Discontents: Exclusion, Persecution, and Rebellion, 1000-1500 in 1996. The book was reviewed by Professor Glenn W. Olsen of the University of Utah in The Catholic Historical Review, by George H. Shriver in Church History, and by P. J. Nugent in The Journal of Religion.

Waugh served as the dean of the Division of Social Sciences from 1992 to 2006. He was a "key negotiator" during the 1993 hunger strike at UCLA, when students demanded that Chicano Studies be added to the syllabus, and he established the discipline on campus.

Waugh went on to serve as acting executive vice chancellor and provost from 2006 to 2008. He served as executive vice chancellor and provost from December 1, 2008 until 2019.

== Works ==
=== Books ===
- Waugh, Scott L. (1988). The Lordship of England: Royal Wardships and Marriages in English Society and Politics, 1217–1327. Princeton, New Jersey: Princeton University Press. ISBN 9780691055091. OCLC 17384982.
- Waugh, Scott L. (1991). England in the Reign of Edward III. Cambridge, U.K.: Cambridge University Press. ISBN 9780521325103. OCLC 21197621.

=== Articles ===
- Diehl, Peter D.; Waugh, Scott L., eds. (1996). Christendom and Its Discontents: Exclusion, Persecution, and Rebellion, 1000–1500. Cambridge, U.K.: Cambridge University Press. ISBN 9780521471831. OCLC 31434395.
- 'The Origins of the Articles of the Escheat', Thirteenth Century V, ed.P.R. Coss and S.D. Lloyd (Woodbridge, 2006).
