= Piers Gaveston, 1st Earl of Cornwall =

Favourite of Edward II (c. 1284 – 1312)

Piers Gaveston
- Earl of Cornwall
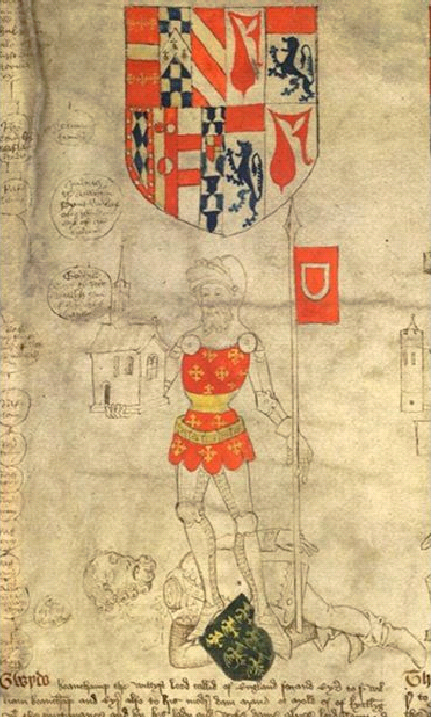
- 15th-century representation of Gaveston lying dead at the feet of Guy de Beauchamp
- Born: c. 1284
- Died: 19 June 1312 (aged 27–28); Blacklow Hill near Warwick, Warwickshire, Kingdom of England
- Buried: Kings Langley, Hertfordshire; 51.71559°N 0.45692°W
- Spouse: Margaret de Clare
- Issue: Joan Gaveston; Amie Gaveston (illegitimate)
- Father: Arnaud de Gabaston
- Mother: Claramonde de Marsan

Piers Gaveston, 1st Earl of Cornwall (c. 1284 – 19 June 1312) was an English nobleman of Gascon origin, and the favourite of Edward II of England.

At a young age, Gaveston made a good impression on King Edward I, who assigned him to the household of the King's son, Edward of Caernarfon. The prince's partiality for Gaveston was so extravagant that Edward I sent Gaveston into exile, but he was recalled a few months later, after the King's death led to the prince's accession as Edward II. Edward bestowed the Earldom of Cornwall on Gaveston, and arranged for him to marry Edward's niece Margaret de Clare, sister of the powerful Earl of Gloucester.

Gaveston's exclusive access to the King provoked several members of the nobility, and in 1308, the King agreed to send him into exile. During this absence, he served as the King's Lord Lieutenant of Ireland. Edward managed to negotiate a deal with the opposition, however, and Gaveston returned the next year. Upon his return his behaviour became even more offensive, and, by the Ordinances of 1311, it was decided that Gaveston should be exiled for a third time, to suffer outlawry if he returned. He did however return in late 1311 and, in 1312, he was hunted down and executed by a group of magnates led by Thomas, 2nd Earl of Lancaster, and Guy de Beauchamp, 10th Earl of Warwick.

It was alleged by medieval chroniclers (as discussed below under "Questions of sexuality") that Edward II and Piers Gaveston were lovers, which was reinforced by later portrayals in fiction, such as Christopher Marlowe's late 16th-century play Edward II. This assertion has received the support of some modern historians, while others have questioned it. According to Pierre Chaplais, the relationship between the two was that of an adoptive brotherhood, and Gaveston served as an unofficial deputy for a reluctant king. Other historians, like J.S. Hamilton, have pointed out that concern over the two men's sexuality was not the crux of the nobility's grievances, which rather centred on Gaveston's exclusive access to royal patronage.

== Family background and early life ==
=== Arnaud de Gabaston ===
Piers Gaveston's father was Arnaud de Gabaston, a Gascon (southwest France) knight in the service of Gaston VII, Viscount of Béarn. He had come into a substantial amount of land in Gascony through his marriage to Claramonde de Marsan, who was co-heir with her brother of the great landowner Arnaud-Guillaume de Marsan. Through the possessions of his wife, he also became a vassal of the King of England, in the King's capacity of Duke of Aquitaine. His service to Edward I of England stretched over a long period, starting in the Welsh Wars of 1282–83, in which he participated with a substantial contingent. Sometime before February 4, 1287, Claramonde died, and for the rest of his life, he struggled to retain his wife's inheritance from rival claims by relatives and neighbours. Because of this, he became financially dependent on the English king and was continuously in his service. He was used as a hostage by Edward twice: first in 1288 to Aragon, secondly in 1294 to the French king, when he managed to escape and flee to England in 1297. After returning home, he was back in England in 1300, where he served with Edward I in the Scottish Wars. He died at some point before 18 May 1302.

Little is known of Piers Gaveston's early years; even his year of birth is unknown. He and Prince Edward of Caernarfon, the future Edward II (born 25 April 1284) were said to be contemporaries (coetanei), so it can be assumed that he was born in or around 1284. Though one chronicle claims he accompanied his father to England in 1297, the first reliable reference to him is from Gascony later that year, when he served in the company of Edward I. In 1300, he sailed to England with his father and his elder brother, Arnaud-Guillaume de Marsan. It was at this time that he became a member of the household of Prince Edward. The King was apparently impressed by Gaveston's conduct and martial skills and wanted him to serve as a model for his son. In 1304, the King awarded Gaveston the wardship of Roger Mortimer of Wigmore, after the death of Mortimer's father, on the request of Edward, Prince of Wales. This put Gaveston in charge of Mortimer's possessions during the latter's minority and served as proof of the King's confidence in his son's companion.

As part of the circle around the prince, however, Gaveston also became entangled in conflicts between the King and his son. These difficulties first materialised in a dispute between treasurer Walter Langton and Prince Edward. The case enraged King Edward to the point where he banned his son from court and banished several men from the prince's household. Though the two were reconciled at a later point, the King still prevented Gaveston from rejoining the prince. This matter was settled before 26 May 1306, the date when Gaveston was knighted, four days after the prince. Later that year, Gaveston was once more in trouble, when he and twenty-one other knights deserted a Scottish campaign to attend a tournament. An arrest order was sent out for the deserters, but, at the insistence of Queen Margaret, they were all pardoned in January 1307.

== First exile and return ==
Gaveston's return to grace was only temporary. On 26 February 1307, Edward I announced that the prince's favourite had to leave the realm shortly after 30 April that year. This time it seems the punishment was not intended for Gaveston, though, but for the Prince of Wales. According to Walter of Guisborough, the prince appeared before the King to request that his own county of Ponthieu be given to Gaveston. Edward I, enraged, tore out handfuls of his son's hair and threw him out of the royal chambers. Though Guisborough cannot necessarily be trusted on the details of the events, the story reflects the general exasperation the King felt with the prince's favouritism towards Gaveston, and the lavish gifts bestowed on the favourite. This extravagance was clearly seen on Gaveston's departure, when Prince Edward equipped him with horses, luxurious clothes, and £260 of money.

Gaveston's first exile was to be a short one. In early July 1307, Edward I fell ill while once more campaigning in the north and lay dying at Burgh by Sands near the Scottish border. According to one chronicle, he gathered some of his most trusted men around him, including Henry de Lacy, Earl of Lincoln; Guy de Beauchamp, Earl of Warwick; and Aymer de Valence, soon to be Earl of Pembroke. Edward entrusted the magnates with the care of his son and instructed them particularly to prevent the return of Piers Gaveston from exile. Nevertheless, when the King died on 7 July, one of Edward II's first acts as king was to recall his friend. Gaveston returned almost immediately, and the two were reunited by early August.

== Earl of Cornwall ==
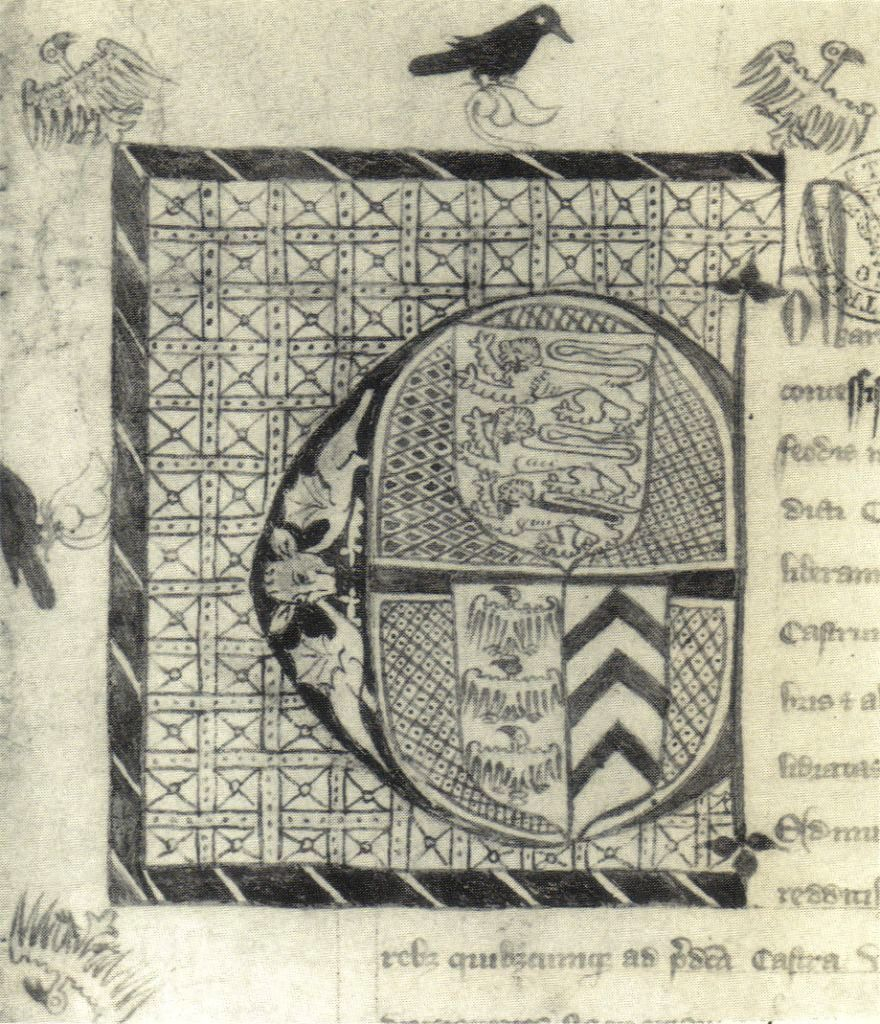
Initial from the charter granting Gaveston the earldom of Cornwall, showing the arms of England at top, and Gaveston's coat of arms impaled with those of de Clare below.

On 6 August 1307, less than a month after succeeding, Edward II made Piers Gaveston Earl of Cornwall. According to contemporary narrative sources, this was a controversial decision. Gaveston came from relatively humble origins, and his rise to the highest level of the peerage was considered improper by the established nobility. Furthermore, the earldom of Cornwall had traditionally been reserved for members of the royal family, and Edward I had intended it for one of his two younger sons from his second marriage. The discontent reported by the chronicles may have been the result of hindsight, however; there is no sign that the established nobility objected to the ennoblement of Gaveston at the time. The earldom gave Gaveston substantial landholdings over great parts of Britain, to the value of £4,000 a year. These possessions consisted of most of Cornwall, as well as parts of Devonshire in the south-west, land in Berkshire and Oxfordshire centred on the honour of Wallingford, most of the eastern part of Lincolnshire, and the honour of Knaresborough in Yorkshire, with the territories that belonged to it. In addition to this, Edward also secured a prestigious marriage between Gaveston and Margaret de Clare, sister of the powerful Earl of Gloucester. The possessions and family connection secured Gaveston a place among the highest levels of the English nobility.

Even though the new king was initially met with goodwill from his subjects, it was not long before certain members of the nobility became disaffected with Gaveston and the special relationship he enjoyed with Edward. On 2 December 1307, exactly one month after Gaveston's marriage, the King organised a tournament in Gaveston's honour at Wallingford Castle. Here Gaveston and his companions in arms handed a humiliating defeat to the earls of Warenne, Hereford, and Arundel. Gaveston won, according to various accounts of the events, either by bringing too many knights to the field, or simply by having a better contingent. From this point on Warenne – and possibly also the other two earls – became hostile to Gaveston.

When Edward II left the country early in 1308 to marry the French king's daughter Isabella, he appointed Gaveston regent in his place. This was a responsibility that would normally be given to a close family member of the reigning king. There is no sign that Gaveston exploited the regency for personal gains, but the other nobles were still offended by his arrogant behaviour. This behaviour continued at the coronation feast after the King's return, during which the King largely ignored his new wife in favour of Gaveston. The collective grievances first found expression in the so-called 'Boulogne agreement' of January 1308, in which the earls of Warenne, Hereford, Lincoln and Pembroke expressed concern about the oppression of the people and attacks on the honour of the crown. Though not mentioned by name, Gaveston was the implied target of this document. Later that year, in the April parliament, the so-called Declaration of 1308 demanded the renewed exile of Gaveston, again without explicitly mentioning the favourite by name. The King initially resisted, but had to give in to the demand once it became clear that the barons had the support of King Philip IV of France, who was offended by Edward's treatment of his daughter. On 18 May, Edward consented to send Gaveston into exile.

== Ireland and return ==
Coat of arms of Piers Gaveston

Gaveston was not exiled immediately; he did not have to leave the realm until 25 June, but faced excommunication by the Archbishop of Canterbury, Robert Winchelsey, should he return. Edward used the intervening period to provide for his favourite's continued prosperity and political importance. As compensation for the loss of the earldom of Cornwall, which was another condition of the exile, Gaveston was granted land worth 3,000 marks annually in Gascony, and land amounting to the same value in England. Further to this, he was appointed the King's Lieutenant of Ireland, so that a certain amount of honour could be maintained despite the humiliation of the exile. The appointment came the day after Richard de Burgh, Earl of Ulster, had been given the same position, indicating that it was an improvised measure. Gaveston's appointment came with wider authority than Ulster's, however, for he had full regal powers to appoint and dismiss any royal officers.

Gaveston's lieutenancy was primarily of a military nature; by the early 14th century, Ireland had become a rebellious and unruly dominion for the English crown. In this capacity Gaveston had considerable success, killing or defeating several major insurgents. He fortified the town of Newcastle McKynegan and Castle Kevin, and rebuilt the road from Castle Kevin to Glendalough. This helped pacify the county at least as far as the Wicklow Mountains, west of Dublin. In the field of administration he made less of a mark. The most notable issue with which he was involved concerned a dispute over murage – a toll on the town walls – between the citizens of Dublin. As during the regency, though, there is no evidence that Gaveston exploited his position for his own advantage and he did nothing to alienate the local elite.

Edward II began working towards a recall before Gaveston had even left. Through the distribution of patronage and concessions to political demands, he won over several of the earls who had previously been of a hostile disposition. Lincoln, who was the leader of the baronial opposition due to his age and great wealth, was reconciled with Edward by late summer of 1308. Even Warwick, who had been the most unyielding of the King's enemies, was gradually mollified. Significantly, though, Thomas, Earl of Lancaster, who had not been involved in the campaign to exile Gaveston, seems to have become disaffected at this time. Nevertheless, by 25 April 1309, Pope Clement V was satisfied that the difficulties between the King and his magnates had been settled, and agreed to lift the interdict against Gaveston. At the parliament that met at Stamford in July, Edward had to agree to a series of political concessions. The so-called Statute of Stamford was based on a similar document Edward I had consented to in 1300, called the articuli super carta, which was in turn based on Magna Carta. Before the Stamford Parliament, however, on 27 June, Gaveston had returned to England.

== Ordinances and final exile ==
On 5 August 1309, Gaveston was reinstated with the earldom of Cornwall. It did not take long, however, for him to alienate the earls once more. The chronicles tell of how Gaveston gave mocking nicknames to other earls, calling Lincoln 'burst-belly', Pembroke 'Joseph the Jew', Lancaster 'the fiddler' and Warwick 'the black dog of Arden' (from the forest of Arden in Warwickshire). Gaveston also began to exploit his relationship with the King more ostentatiously, obtaining favours and appointments for his friends and servants. The political climate became so hateful that in February 1310, a number of the earls refused to attend parliament as long as Gaveston was present. Gaveston was dismissed and, when parliament convened, the disaffected barons presented a list of grievances they wanted addressed. On 16 March, the King was forced to appoint a group of men to ordain reforms of the royal household. This group of so-called Lords Ordainers consisted of eight earls, seven bishops and six barons. Among the earls were supporters of the King, like Gloucester and John of Brittany, Earl of Richmond, as well as strong opponents, like Lancaster and Warwick.

While the Ordainers were at work drafting their reform document, Edward decided to address one of the main causes behind the discontent: the Scottish situation. Edward II had, almost immediately after his accession, abandoned the relentless Scottish campaigns of his father. As a result, Robert the Bruce had been able to regain the initiative in the war, reconquer lost territory, and stage destructive raids into the north of England. To aggravate matters, Edward had continued to raise extortionate taxes, ostensibly for the war in Scotland, but without showing any result. If the King could produce victory against the Scots, this would go a long way towards undermining the work of the Ordainers. In June, the King summoned the magnates for a military campaign, but most of the Ordainers refused on the basis of the work they were performing. When the King departed for Scotland in September, only Gloucester, Warenne and Gaveston among the earls accompanied him. The campaign proved frustrating for Edward, when Bruce refused to engage in open battle, or even get involved in negotiations. In February, Gaveston was sent with an army north from Roxburgh to Perth, but he failed to track down the Scottish army.

While the royal army was in the north, Edward received news from London that the Earl of Lincoln had died on 6 February 1311. This meant that a moderating influence on the baronial party had been lost, at the same time as the antagonistic Earl of Lancaster – who was Lincoln's son-in-law and heir – emerged as the leader of the Ordainers. With the Ordainers ready to present their programme of reform, Edward had to summon a parliament. In late July he appointed Gaveston Lieutenant of Scotland, and departed for London. Bruce still evaded the English successfully, in early August even staging a raid into northern England, and shortly after this Gaveston withdrew to Bamburgh Castle in Northumberland. When parliament met on 16 August, the King was presented with a set of proposed reforms of the royal household, as well as specific attacks on individuals, including a demand for the renewed exile of Piers Gaveston. Edward initially offered to agree to the reforms as long as Gaveston was allowed to stay, but the Ordainers refused. The King held out for as long as he could, but eventually had to agree to the Ordinances, which were published on 27 September. On 3 November, two days after the allotted deadline, Gaveston left England once again.

== Return and death ==
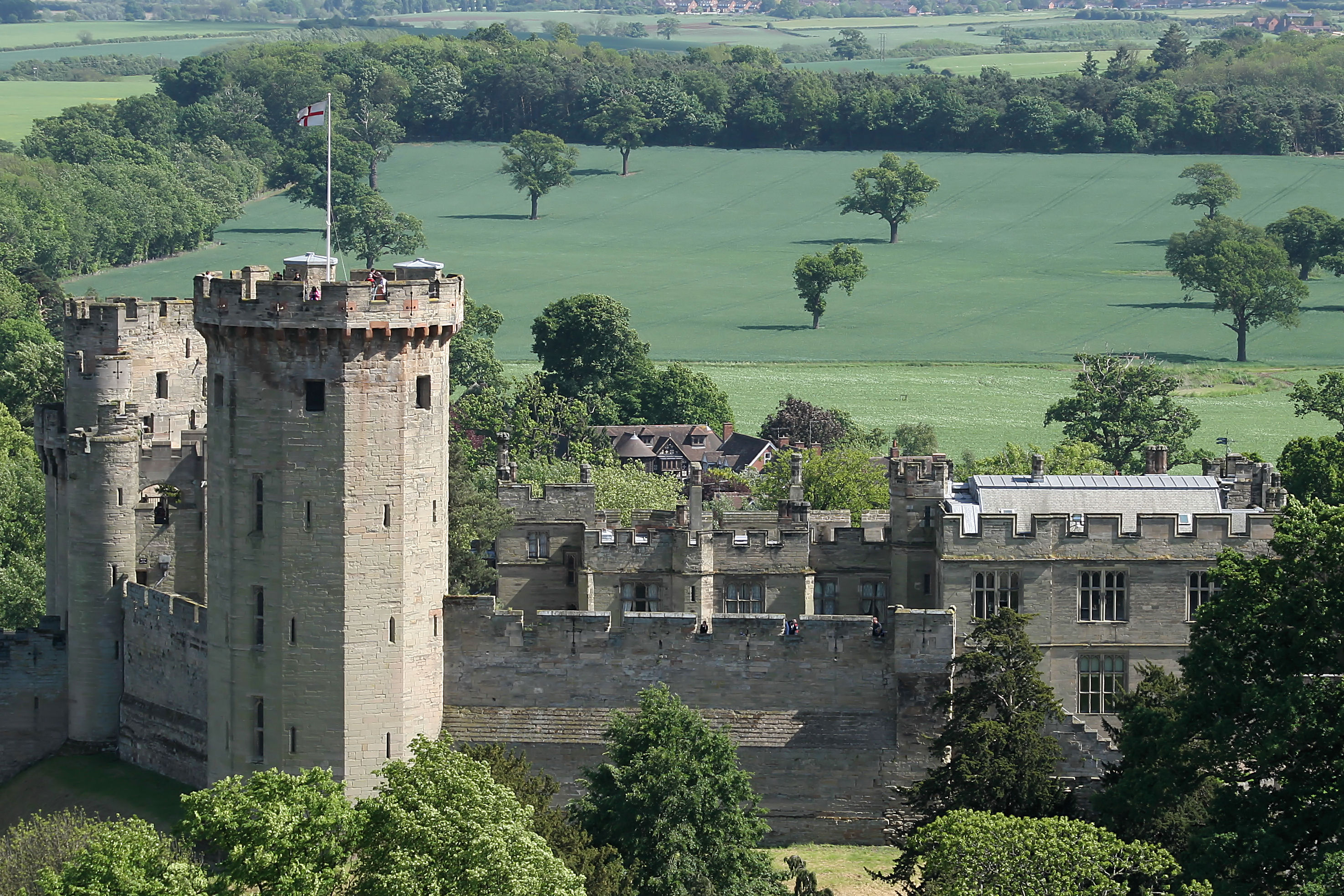
View of Warwick Castle from St Mary's Church

It is not known where Gaveston spent his time abroad; the conditions of his exile banned him from staying in any of the lands of the English king. This precluded both Aquitaine and Ireland, where he had spent previous exiles.

There is some evidence that he might have gone to France initially, but considering the French king's hostile attitude towards him, he is not likely to have stayed there long. Flanders is a much more likely candidate for Gaveston's third and final exile. This time his absence was even shorter than the second time, lasting no more than two months. Returning around Christmas 1311, he was reunited with the King early in 1312, probably at Knaresborough on 13 January. The reason for his quick return might have been the birth of his child, a daughter named Joan, around this time. On 18 January, Edward declared the judgement against Gaveston unlawful, and restored all lands to him.

The royal and baronial parties now both began preparations for war. In March, Gaveston settled at Scarborough, and began to fortify the castle. Around the same time, he was pronounced excommunicated by Archbishop Winchelsey at St Paul's. At the same meeting the barons – under the leadership of Lancaster – divided up the realm to oppose the King. Pembroke and Warenne were given the responsibility of capturing Gaveston.

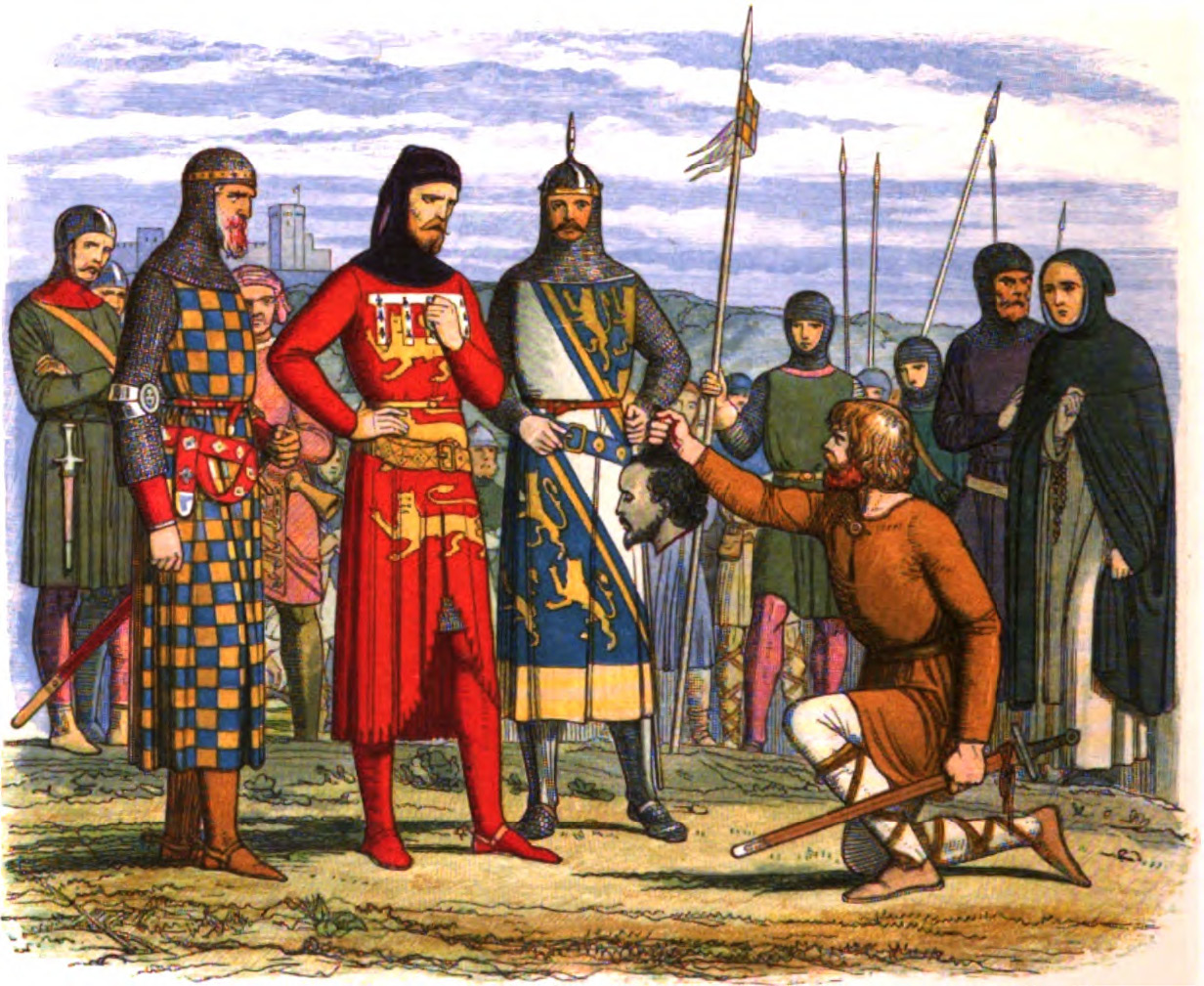
Gaveston's Head Shown to the Earl of Lancaster, from a popular history book of 1868

On 4 May, the King and Gaveston were at Newcastle, and barely escaped a force led by Lancaster, Henry Percy and Robert Clifford. Gaveston then returned to Scarborough, while the King left for York. Scarborough was soon besieged by Pembroke, Warenne, Percy and Clifford, and on 19 May Gaveston surrendered to the besiegers.

The terms of the surrender were that Pembroke, Warenne and Percy would take Gaveston to York, where the barons would negotiate with the king. If an agreement could not be reached by 1 August, Gaveston would be allowed to return to Scarborough. The three swore an oath to guarantee his safety. After an initial meeting with the King in York, Gaveston was left in the custody of Pembroke, who escorted him south for safekeeping.

On 9 June, Pembroke left to visit his wife, leaving Gaveston at the rectory at Deddington in Oxfordshire. When Warwick found out about Gaveston's whereabouts, he immediately rode out to capture him. The next morning he appeared at the rectory, where he took Gaveston captive and brought him back to his castle at Warwick. Pembroke, whose honour had been affronted, appealed for justice both to Gaveston's brother-in-law Gloucester and to the University of Oxford, but to no avail. At Warwick, Gaveston was condemned to death for violating the terms of the Ordinances before an assembly of barons, including Warwick, Lancaster, Hereford and Arundel.

On 19 June, he was taken out on the road towards Kenilworth as far as Blacklow Hill, which was on the Earl of Lancaster's land. Here, two Welshmen ran him through with a sword and beheaded him.

== Aftermath ==
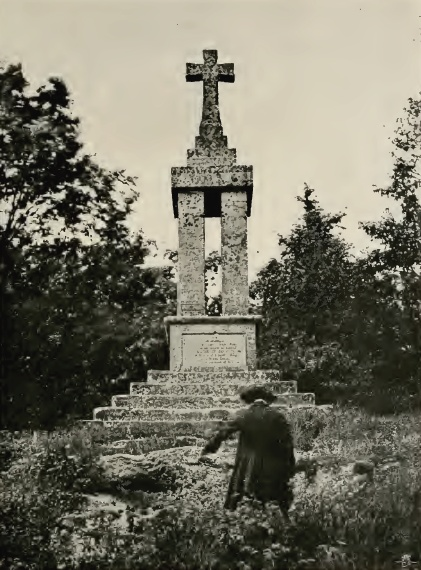
The 1823 Gaveston monument at Blacklow Hill, 52.3052°N 1.5774°W

Gaveston's body was simply left behind at the site of his execution. One chronicle tells of how four shoemakers brought it to Warwick, who refused to accept it, and ordered them to take it back outside his jurisdiction. Eventually, a group of Dominican friars brought it to Oxford.

A proper burial could not be arranged while Gaveston was still excommunicated, and it was not until 2 January 1315, after the King had secured a papal absolution for his favourite, that he could have his body buried in an elaborate ceremony at the Dominican foundation of Kings Langley Priory; the tomb is now lost. A cross with an inscription was erected at Blacklow Hill in 1823 by local squire Bertie Greathead on the site believed to be the location of Gaveston's execution.

Edward also provided a generous endowment for Gaveston's widow Margaret, who in 1317 married Hugh de Audley, later Earl of Gloucester. The King tried to find a suitable marriage for Piers' and Margaret's daughter Joan, but these arrangements came to nothing when Joan died in 1325, at the age of thirteen.

There is also some evidence that Gaveston might have fathered another, extra-marital daughter; one contemporary document refers to an "Amie filie Petri de Gaveston". This Amie was a chamberlain of Edward III's wife, Queen Philippa, and later married John Driby, a yeoman of the royal family.

Edward's initial reaction to the news of Gaveston's execution was rage; according to the Vita Edwardi, he swore to avenge the act. Circumstances, however, prevented him from taking immediate action against the executioners. During the previous raid on Newcastle, the King and Gaveston had to escape quickly, leaving behind horses and jewels worth a great amount of money. At the same time, the barons' extralegal action had alienated many of their former associates; the Earl of Pembroke, in particular, became strongly tied to the King's cause after the affront to his honour.

Through the arbitration of the Earl of Gloucester and others, a settlement was finally reached on 14 October 1313, whereby the barons were given a pardon and the horses and jewels were returned to the King. The following years were marked by a constant power struggle between Edward and Lancaster, centred on the maintenance of the Ordinances. The matter was not finally settled until 1322, when Lancaster was defeated at the Battle of Boroughbridge, and executed.

== Questions of sexuality ==
It was hinted at by medieval chroniclers, and has been alleged by some modern historians, that the relationship between Gaveston and Edward was sexual. The Annales Paulini claims that Edward loved Gaveston "beyond measure", while the Lanercost Chronicle says the intimacy between them was "undue". The Chronicle of Melsa states that Edward "delighted too much in the sodomitical vice", without making special reference to Gaveston. The portrayal of Gaveston as homosexual continued in fictional portrayals, such as Christopher Marlowe's play Edward II from the early 1590s, and the 1924 adaptation of that work by Bertolt Brecht and Lion Feuchtwanger.

Modern historians have been divided on the issue. T. F. Tout, writing in 1914, rejected the idea. J. S. Hamilton, who wrote a biography of Gaveston in 1988, on the other hand, says that "there is no question that the king and his favourite were lovers". Pierre Chaplais, writing a few years later, had more reservations. Chaplais cites the fact that Edward had four children with his wife – and even an extra-marital son – (despite bisexuality being a possibility) as well as the relative silence of contemporary commentators on the topic. He also finds it hard to believe that Philip IV of France would have allowed the English king to marry his daughter Isabella if Edward was known to be homosexual. Mark Ormrod has pointed out the inherent anachronism of speaking of homosexuality in a medieval context. Instead, Ormrod suggests the focus should be on the motivation behind the use of sexuality in contemporary attacks on the King and Gaveston.

If the king and Gaveston were indeed lovers, the question remains of what effect this had on their respective careers and eventual downfalls. John Boswell, in his Christianity, Social Tolerance, and Homosexuality, calls Gaveston Edward's lover, and writes that there is little doubt "that [Edward's] wife and the barons of England were violently hostile to Edward's sexual proclivities, although he more than fulfilled his royal duties by fathering four children with Isabella". Boswell argues that Edward and Gaveston fell victim to a new-found concern about sexual morals among the secular powers of Europe, manifested shortly before in the trial of the Knights Templar in 1307. This interpretation is disputed by Hamilton. "The favourite was murdered because of his control of patronage," writes Hamilton, "not because of his access to the king's bedchamber". This same view is also expressed by Roy Martin Haines, in his 2003 biography of Edward II.

== Historical assessment ==
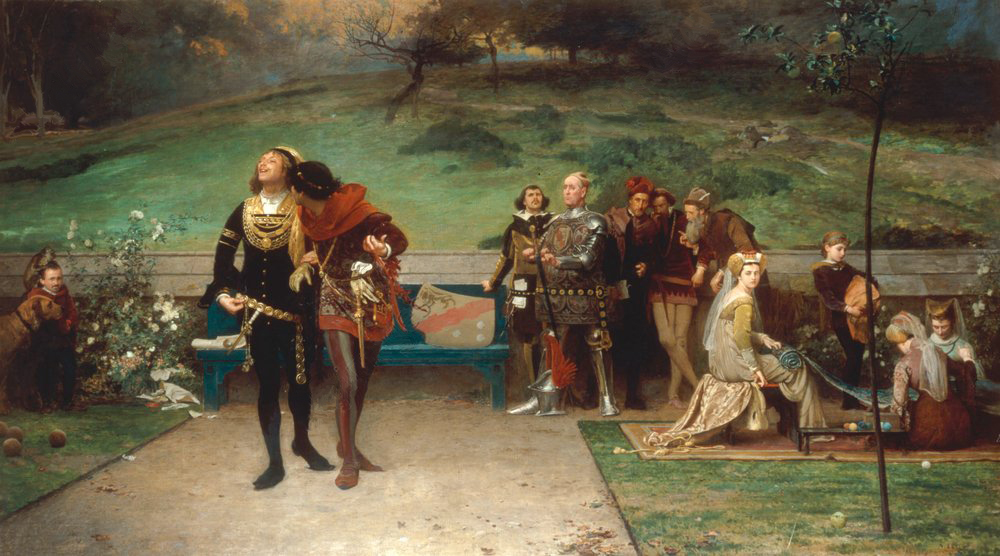
An 1872 painting by English artist Marcus Stone shows Edward II cavorting with Gaveston at left, while nobles and courtiers look on with concern.

Contemporary and near-contemporary chroniclers were generally negative in their attitudes towards Gaveston, blaming the royal favourite for many of the problems of the reign. Gaveston was accused of such various crimes as draining the treasury, orchestrating the arrest of treasurer Walter Langton, and filling the court with foreigners. According to the Lanercost Chronicle, "There was not anyone who had a good word to say about the king or Piers." Nevertheless, the chroniclers did not deny that he had certain good qualities. Irish chroniclers were appreciative both of his military and administrative skills during his period in Ireland. Likewise, Geoffrey the Baker called him "graceful and agile in body, sharp-witted, refined in manner, [and] sufficiently well versed in military matters".

Marlowe, however, focused exclusively on the negative aspects of Gaveston's biography, portraying him – according to Hamilton – as "a sycophantic homosexual with a marked tendency towards avarice, nepotism, and especially overweening pride". This was the impression that lived on in the popular imagination.

The first modern historians to deal with the reign of Edward II – William Stubbs, Thomas Frederick Tout and James Conway Davies – added little to the understanding of Gaveston. While generally agreeing with the chronicles, they allotted him no importance within their own main field of interest, that of constitutional history. For later generations of historians, the focus shifted from constitutional to personal issues. From the 1970s onwards, the topic of study became the personal relations between magnates and the crown, and the distribution of patronage. It is to this school of thought that Hamilton's biography belongs, in which he argues that it was Gaveston's exclusive access to royal patronage that was the driving force behind the baronial animosity towards him.

Chaplais, on the other hand, takes a different approach to the study of Gaveston and his place in the reign of Edward II. According to Chaplais, Edward was more or less indifferent to the practice of kingship, and essentially delegated the job to Gaveston. As an alternative to a homosexual relationship, Chaplais suggests that the bond that existed between the King and Gaveston was that of an adoptive brotherhood. This concept had a Biblical precedent in the traditionalist, platonic interpretation of the relationship between David and Jonathan, and also existed in the Middle Ages, as exemplified in The Song of Roland, the story of Roland and Olivier.

In modern popular culture, Gaveston has been portrayed in a variety of ways. In Derek Jarman's 1991 film Edward II, based on Marlowe's play, Edward and Gaveston are presented as victims of homophobia and prejudice.

In the 1995 movie Braveheart, on the other hand, Gaveston (thinly disguised as the character "Phillip") is again caricatured as arrogant and effeminate. There is also an Oxford University dining and drinking club called the Piers Gaveston Society.

== Sources ==
Primary:

- Guisborough, Walter of (1957). Harry Rothwell (ed.). The Chronicle of Walter of Guisborough. 3. Vol. 89. London: Camden Society.
- Childs, W. R., ed. (2005). Vita Edwardi Secundi. Oxford: Oxford University Press. ISBN 978-0-19-927594-6.

Secondary:

- Altschul, Michael (1965). A Baronial Family in Medieval England: The Clares, 1217–1314. Baltimore: The Johns Hopkins University Press.
- Barrow, G. W. S. (1965). Robert Bruce and the Community of the Realm of Scotland. London: Eyre & Spottiswoode.
- Boswell, John (1980). Christianity, Social Tolerance, and Homosexuality: Gay People in Western Europe from the Beginning of the Christian Era to the Fourteenth Century. Chicago: University of Chicago Press. ISBN 978-0-226-06711-7.
- Burgtorf, J. (2008). "With my Life, His Joyes Began and Ended: Piers Gaveston and King Edward II of England Revisited". In Nigel Saul (ed.). Fourteenth Century England V. Woodbridge: Boydell Press. pp. 31–51. ISBN 978-1-84383-387-1.
- Chaplais, P. (1994). Piers Gaveston: Edward II's Adoptive Brother. Oxford: Clarendon Press. ISBN 978-0-19-820449-7.
- Davies, James Conway (1918). The Baronial Opposition to Edward II: Its Character and Policy, a Study in Administrative History. London: Cass.
- Given-Wilson, Chris (1996). The English Nobility in the Late Middle Ages. London: Routledge. ISBN 978-0-415-14883-2.
- Haines, Roy Martin (2003). King Edward II: Edward of Caernarfon, His Life, His Reign, and Its Aftermath, 1284–1330. Montreal, London: McGill-Queens University Press. ISBN 978-0-7735-2432-3.
- Hamilton, J. S. (1988). Piers Gaveston, Earl of Cornwall, 1307–1312: Politics and Patronage in the Reign of Edward II. Detroit; London: Wayne State University Press; Harvester-Wheatsheaf. pp. 92–3. ISBN 978-0-8143-2008-2.
- Hamilton, J. S. (2004). "Gaveston, Piers, earl of Cornwall (d. 1312)". Oxford Dictionary of National Biography. Vol. 1. Oxford: Oxford University Press. doi:10.1093/ref:odnb/10463.
- Heyam, Kit (2020). The Reputation of Edward II, 1305-1697: A Literary Transformation of History. Amsterdam University Press. ISBN 978-94-6372-933-8.
- McKisack, May (1959). The Fourteenth Century: 1307–1399. Oxford: Oxford University Press.
- Maddicot, J. R. (1970). Thomas of Lancaster, 1307–1322. Oxford: Oxford University Press. ISBN 978-0-19-821837-1. OCLC 132766.
- Mortimer, Ian (2003). The Greatest Traitor: the Life of Sir Roger Mortimer, 1st Earl of March, Ruler of England 1327–1330. London: Jonathan Cape. ISBN 978-0-224-06249-7.
- Phillips, J. R. S. (1972). Aymer de Valence, Earl of Pembroke 1307–1324. Oxford: Oxford University Press. ISBN 978-0-19-822359-7. OCLC 426691.
- Phillips, Seymour (2010). Edward II. New Haven: Yale University Press. ISBN 978-0-300-15657-7.
- Prestwich, Michael (1997). Edward I (updated ed.). New Haven: Yale University Press. ISBN 978-0-300-07209-9.
- Prestwich, Michael (2007). Plantagenet England: 1225–1360 (new ed.). Oxford: Oxford University Press. ISBN 978-0-19-822844-8.
- Tout, T. F. (1914). The place of the Reign of Edward II in English History. Manchester: Manchester University Press.
- Tuck, Anthony (1985). Crown and Nobility 1272–1461: Political Conflict in Late Medieval England. London: Fontana. ISBN 978-0-00-686084-6.

Peerage of England
Vacant Title last held by Edmund of Almain	Earl of Cornwall; 1307–1312	Vacant Title next held by John of Eltham
Political offices
Preceded by Edmund Butler	Lord Lieutenant of Ireland; 1308–1309	Succeeded by John Wogan
