= Mahaut of Châtillon =

French noblewoman (1293–1358)

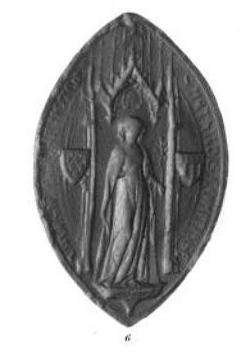
- Born: 1293
- Died: 3 October 1358
- Noble family: Châtillon
- Spouse: Charles of Valois (m. 1308; died 1325)
- Issue: Marie, Duchess of Calabria; Isabella, Duchess of Bourbon; Blanche, Queen of Germany; Louis, Count of Chartres
- Father: Guy IV of Châtillon, Count of Saint-Pol
- Mother: Marie of Brittany

Mahaut of Châtillon (1293 – 3 October 1358) was the daughter of Guy IV of Châtillon, Count of Saint-Pol and Marie of Brittany.

== Marriage ==
Born in 1293, Mahaut was the daughter of Guy IV of Châtillon, Count of Saint-Pol and Marie of Brittany, daughter of John II, Duke of Brittany and Beatrice of England. In 1308 she married Charles, Count of Valois, the third son of King Philip III of France and Isabella of Aragon. He was also the younger brother of King Philip IV. Charles himself had married twice before; upon the death of his second wife Catherine of Courtenay in 1308, he married Mahaut. Mahaut and Charles had four children. One of their daughters would make them ancestors of French kings, and another daughter would become Queen of Germany.

Mahaut and Charles's children were:

- Marie (1309–1332). Married Charles, Duke of Calabria and had issue.
- Isabella (1313 – 26 August 1388). She married Peter I, Duke of Bourbon. Had issue
- Blanche (1317–1348). She married Charles IV, King of Germany and Bohemia (after her death, he became Holy Roman Emperor). Sometimes called "Marguerite". Had issue
- Louis, Count of Chartres (1318–1328). Died young, no issue

Her husband Charles died in 1325. Mahaut died 33 years later in 1358 at the age of 65, having outlived three of her four children; only her second daughter Isabella outlived her.

== Ancestors ==
Ancestors of Mahaut of Châtillon

8. Hugh I, Count of Blois
4. Guy III, Count of Saint-Pol
9. Marie of Avesnes
2. Guy IV, Count of Saint-Pol
10. Henry II, Duke of Brabant
5. Matilda of Brabant
11. Maria of Swabia
1. Mahaut of Châtillon
12. John I, Duke of Brittany
6. John II, Duke of Brittany
13. Blanche of Navarre
3. Marie of Brittany
14. Henry III of England
7. Beatrice of England
15. Eleanor of Provence

== Sources ==
- Henneman, John Bell (1971). Royal Taxation in Fourteenth-Century France: The Development of War Financing, 1322–1359. Princeton University Press. ISBN 0-691-05188-7.
- Russell, Delbert W. (2013). "The Cultural Context of the French Prose "remaniement" of the Life of Edward the Confessor by a nun of Barking Abbey". In Wogan-Browne, Jocelyn (ed.). Language and Culture in Medieval Britain: The French of England, C.1100-c.1500. Boydell & Brewer.
