= Marie de St Pol =

Foundress of Pembroke College, Cambridge

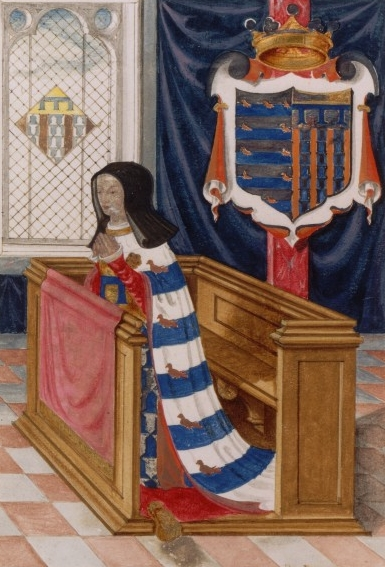
Marie de Châtillon at prayer (Bibliothèque nationale de France)

Marie de St Pol, Countess of Pembroke (c. 1303 – 1377) was the second wife of Franco-English nobleman Aymer de Valence, 2nd Earl of Pembroke, and is best known as the founder (or foundress) of Pembroke College, Cambridge.

== Family and early life ==
Marie was born into the powerful French house of Châtillon, Counts of Saint Pol. Her father was Guy IV, Count of Saint-Pol and her mother was Marie of Brittany. During the thirteenth and fourteenth centuries, the Châtillons married more often into the royal line than any other noble family, and they were renowned for holding prominent positions as Cardinals and Constables of France. Marie herself was cousin to Charles, Duke of Brittany. She was the fourth daughter of Guy, Count of St Pol and Marie of Brittany. She had four sisters and two brothers, but nothing is known about her childhood. She was also the great-granddaughter of Henry III of England through her mother.

== Marriage to the Earl of Pembroke ==
Marie and Pembroke were married in Paris in 1321. Both Philippe V of France and Edward II of England were involved in the negotiations for her marriage. Marie was only seventeen when she married, whilst her husband was already fifty. It was his second marriage after the death of his first wife Béatrice de Clermont in 1320. Almost nothing is known of their three years of marriage except the occasion of his death in France on 23 June 1324. They had no children.

Legend has it that she was maiden, wife, and widow all in the space of a single day when her husband was killed in front of her in a friendly jousting match, arranged to celebrate their marriage in 1324. However, other writers indicate he was murdered or died of apoplexy.

After Aymer's death, Marie was free to use her considerable wealth for religious and charitable ends.

== Temple Newsam, Leeds ==
In 1327, Marie de St Pol was granted the estate at Temple Newsam, Leeds by Edward III in exchange for estates in Hertford, Haverford, Higham Ferrers, Monmouth and Hodenak. The deed stated that it was for Edward's "dear kinswoman" and that the estate was worth £70 per annum. She was also granted the estate at Temple Hirst, now in North Yorkshire, which was worth £30 per annum. Marie held the manor at Temple Newsam for 50 years. It is not known whether she lived there and built a house on the site, but it is likely.

== Denny Abbey ==
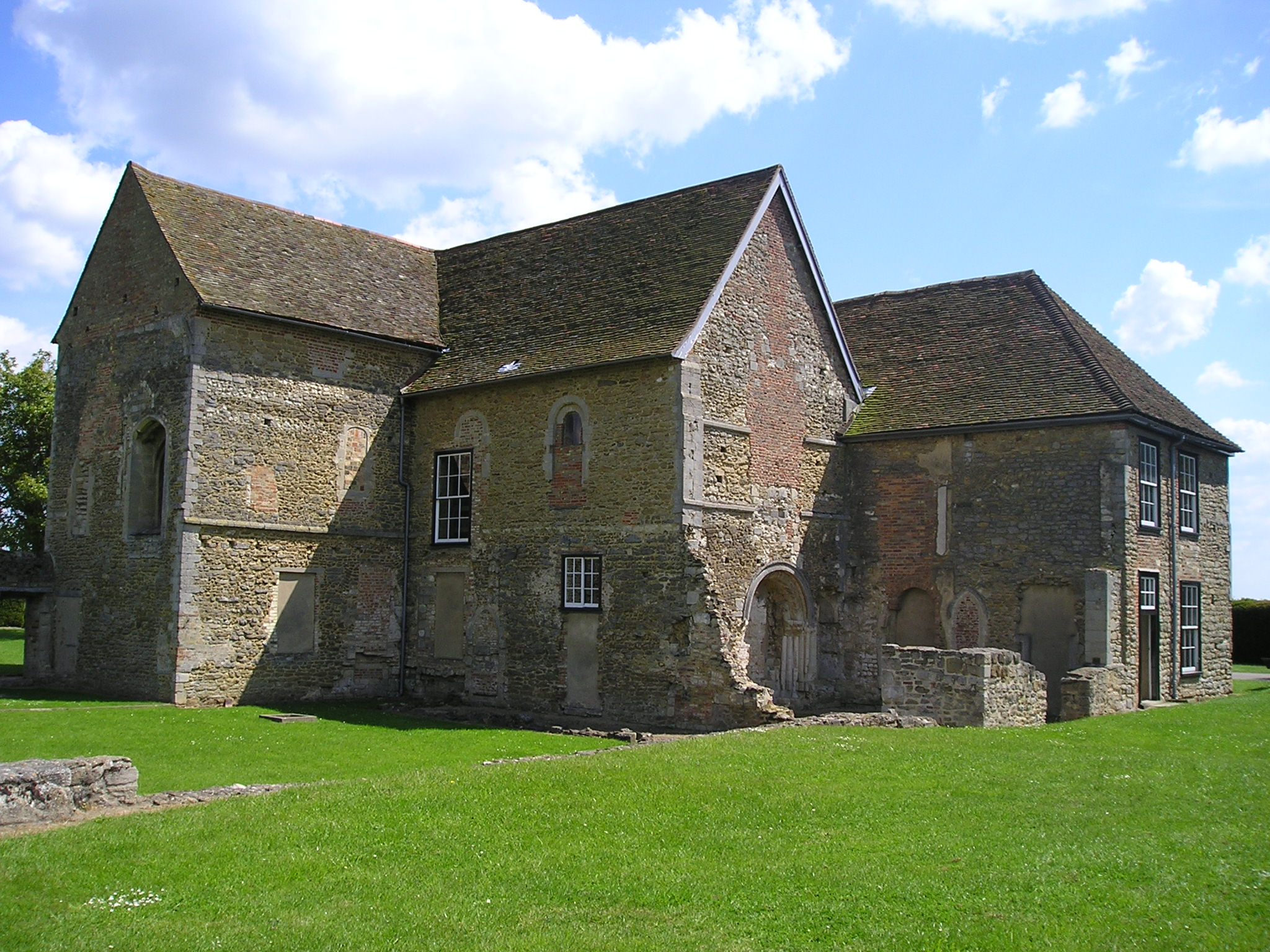
Denny Abbey, between Cambridge and Ely; the burial place of Marie de St Pol

In 1336, Marie was granted the manor of Denny in Cambridgeshire by Edward III, and there organised the foundation of a Franciscan nunnery in 1342; the order is known as the Poor Clares. The order was strengthened when the nearby community at Waterbeach was closed. Marie adapted part of the abbey as a home. The former choir of the church was pulled down and Marie built a more spacious choir, divided between herself and the nuns. The former nave was also divided and partly converted into her private accommodation. The south aisle of the church was pulled down and a two-storey building was made for her ladies-in-waiting and domestic staff. After Marie's death, this accommodation became the guest lodgings for the nunnery.

== Foundation of Pembroke College, Cambridge ==
Edward III's charter in 1347 gave Marie the authority to found a house of scholars in Cambridge, allowing them to study in the faculties of the university and also awarded them property in Cambridge for their habitation. The resulting college was known as the Hall of Valence-Mary, and is known today as Pembroke College, home to over 700 students and fellows. This makes it the oldest Cambridge College with an unbroken constitution from its foundation to survive on its original site. In 1355 and 1366, Marie acquired papal bulls to allow the college its own chapel, which was the first college chapel to be built in Cambridge. This chapel building still exists as the Old Library, immediately to the left (or north) of the college gatehouse. It should not be confused with the later classical chapel to the south by Sir Christopher Wren.

The first statutes of the college gave preference to students born in France who had already studied elsewhere in England. The foundation of the college demonstrates Mary's piety as well as her interest in education. Mary favoured the Franciscan order of Christianity, so she required that at least one proctor always be a Franciscan friar. In addition, this kind of charitable bequest to house and support thirty scholars benefited her soul, according to the tenets of medieval Christianity.

Marie arranged for the fellows of the college to be the counsellors and instructors of the nuns at Denny Abbey.

== Later life ==
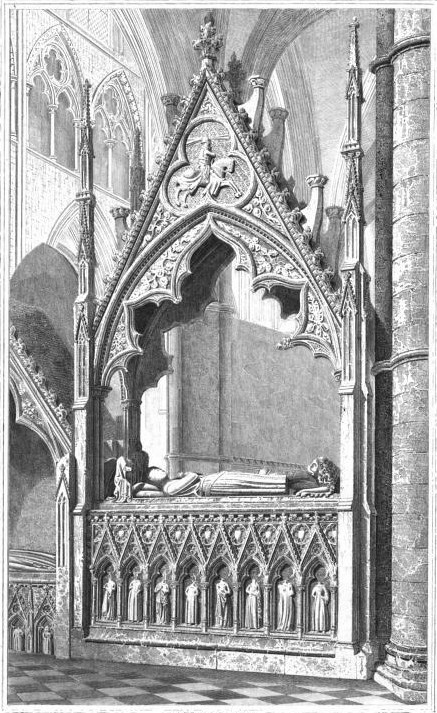
The tomb of Aymer de Valence, 2nd Earl of Pembroke, the husband of Marie de St Pol, in Westminster Abbey. Engraving by Edward Blore.

Marie had important ties with both the English and French kings. In 1326 Edward II exempted her from the royal order to arrest all French persons, and Edward III exempted her from the 1337 confiscation of the lands of aliens. As well as lands in France that she held in her own right, she also acquired the estates that had belonged to her husband. However, in 1372 her lands in France were confiscated by King Charles V.

Marie drew up her will on 20 February 1377 at her estate of Braxted Park in Great Braxted in Essex, which stipulated that she wanted to be buried in the choir of the chapel at Denny in the habit of a Franciscan nun. Marie died on the 16 or 17 March 1377 and was buried in Denny Abbey, to the north of Cambridge on the road to Ely. The abbey became a farmhouse and all traces of Marie de St Pol's tomb have been lost. She is believed to have been buried next to the high altar; the site is now grass.

In 1992 a memorial was placed on a pillar opposite her husband's splendid tomb effigy in Westminster Abbey, situated in the north ambulatory. Designed by Donald Buttress, Abbey Surveyor, the memorial was made from slate and stone with partial gilding, and bears the Countess's coat of arms and the inscription:

“MARY DE ST POL COUNTESS OF PEMBROKE 1304 AD 1377”.

== See also ==
- Elizabeth de Burgh, Lady of Clare
- Countess of Pembroke
