= John, Count of Saint-Pol =

14th Century Count

John of Saint-Pol (died 1344) was Count of Saint-Pol between 1317 and 1344.

He was the eldest son of Guy IV, Count of Saint-Pol and Marie of Brittany.

He married in 1319 with Joanna, daughter of John I of Fiennes, and had 2 children:

- Guy V, Count of Saint-Pol, no issue;
- Mathilde (1335–1373), married Guy I, Count of Ligny.

== Sources ==
John, Count of Saint-Pol House of Châtillon Died: 1344
Preceded by Guy IV	Count of Saint-Pol; 1317–1344	Succeeded by Guy V
