= Marie of Brittany, Countess of Saint-Pol =

13th C Capetian Noble

- Born: 1268
- Died: 1339 (aged 70–71)
- Noble family: House of Dreux
- Spouse: Guy IV, Count of Saint-Pol
- Issue Detail: John of Châtillon; Mahaut of Châtillon; Marie of Châtillon
- Father: John II, Duke of Brittany
- Mother: Beatrice of England

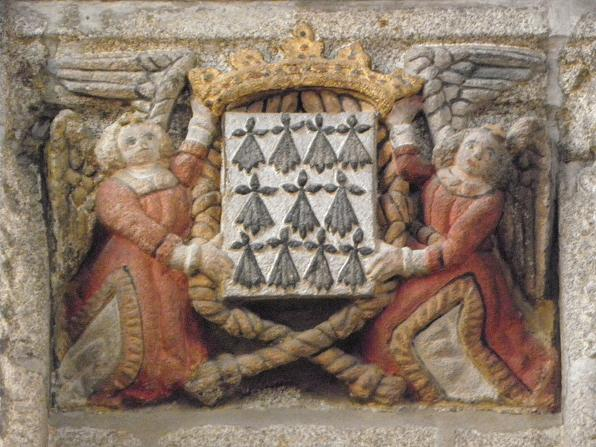
Brittany coat of arms in the form of a banner on an altarpiece in the Church of Saint-Sulpice in Fougères (Brittany).

Marie of Brittany (1268–1339) was the daughter of John II, Duke of Brittany, and Beatrice of England. She is also known as Marie de Dreux.

== Family ==
Her maternal grandparents were Henry III of England and Eleanor of Provence, Henry was a son of King John of England. John was son of Henry II of England and his wife Eleanor of Aquitaine.

Her sister was Blanche of Brittany, wife to Philip of Artois and mother of Margaret of Artois, Robert III of Artois and Joan of Artois, Countess of Foix. Margaret was mother of Jeanne d'Évreux, Queen of France.

== Marriage ==
She married Guy IV, Count of Saint-Pol, in 1292, their children were as follows:

- John of Châtillon (d. 1344), Count of Saint Pol
- James of Châtillon (d.s.p. 1365), Lord of Ancre
- Mahaut of Châtillon (1293–1358), married Charles of Valois
- Beatrix of Châtillon, married in 1315 Jean de Dampierre, Lord of Crèvecœur
- Isabeau of Châtillon (d. 19 May 1360), married in May 1311 Guillaume I de Coucy, Lord of Coucy
- Marie of Châtillon, married Aymer de Valence, 2nd Earl of Pembroke
- Eleanor of Châtillon, married Jean III Malet, Lord of Granville
- Joan of Châtillon, married Miles de Noyers, Lord of Maisy

== Ancestry ==
Ancestors of Marie of Brittany, Countess of Saint-Pol

8. Peter I, Duke of Brittany
4. John I, Duke of Brittany
9. Alix of Thouars
2. John II, Duke of Brittany
10. Theobald I of Navarre
5. Blanche of Navarre
11. Agnes of Beaujeu
1. Marie of Brittany
12. John of England
6. Henry III of England
13. Isabella of Angoulême
3. Beatrice of England
14. Ramon Berenguer IV, Count of Provence
7. Eleanor of Provence
15. Beatrice of Savoy
