= Eleanor of Brittany =

Eleanor of Brittany may refer to:

- Eleanor, Fair Maid of Brittany (1184–1241), daughter of Geoffrey II, Duke of Brittany and Constance, Duchess of Brittany, long-time prisoner of English kings.
- Eleanor of Brittany (abbess) (1275–1342), daughter of John II, Duke of Brittany and Beatrice of England, abbess of Fontevraud.
