= Guy V of Saint-Pol =

14th Century Count

Guy V of Châtillon, Count of Saint-Pol
- Died: 1360; London
- Noble family: House of Châtillon
- Spouse: Johanna of Luxembourg-Ligny
- Father: John, Count of Saint-Pol
- Mother: Johanna of Fiennes

Guy V of Châtillon, Count of Saint-Pol (d. 1360 in London) was a French nobleman. He was a member of the House of Châtillon and was the son of Count John of Saint-Pol (d. 1344) and his wife Johanna of Fiennes.

In the Hundred Years' War, he served as a royal commander (lieutenant du roi) in the French army. He fought several battles against the English in Picardy. He was one of the hostages sent to England under the terms of the Treaty of Brétigny of 1360. He died of the plague shortly after arriving in London.

Guy was married to Johanna (d. 1392), a daughter of Lord John I of Ligny. Since they had no children, he was succeeded as Count of Saint-Pol by his sister Mahaut and her husband Guy of Luxembourg-Ligny.

== Sources ==
- Russell, Delbert W. (2013). "The Cultural of the French Prose remaniement of the Life of Edward the Confessor by a Nun of Barking Abbey". In Collette, Carolyn P.; Wogan-Browne, Jocelyn (eds.). Language and Culture in Medieval Britain: The French of England, C.1100-c.1500. York Medieval Press. ISBN 9781903153475.

Guy V of Saint-Pol House of Châtillon Died: 1360
Preceded by John	Count of Saint-Pol; 1344–1360	Succeeded by Mahaut and Guy
