= Guy IV of Saint-Pol =

French noble

Guy IV of Châtillon
- Count of Saint-Pol
- Born: c. 1254
- Died: 6 April 1317 (aged 62–63)
- Noble family: Châtillon
- Spouse: Marie of Brittany
- Issue: John of Châtillon; Mahaut of Châtillon; Marie of Châtillon
- Father: Guy III, Count of Saint-Pol
- Mother: Matilda of Brabant

Guy IV of Châtillon, Count of Saint Pol (c. 1254– 6 April 1317) was a French nobleman. He was the son of Guy III, Count of Saint-Pol and Matilda of Brabant.

In 1292, he married Marie of Brittany, daughter of John II, Duke of Brittany and Beatrice of England. They had:

- John, Count of Saint-Pol (d. 1344), married Joanna, daughter of John I of Fiennes
- Jacques of Châtillon (d.s.p. 1365), Lord of Ancre
- Mahaut of Châtillon (1293–1358), married in 1308 Charles of Valois
- Beatrix of Châtillon, married in 1315 John of Dampierre, Lord of Crèvecœur
- Isabeau of Châtillon (d. 19 May 1360), married in May 1311 Guillaume I de Coucy, Lord of Coucy
- Marie of Châtillon, married Aymer de Valence, 2nd Earl of Pembroke
- Eleanor of Châtillon, married John III Malet, Lord of Graville
- Jeanne of Châtillon, married Miles de Noyers, Lord of Maisy

He held the office of Grand Butler of France.

He was placed in joint command (with Robert VI of Auvergne) of one of the two reserve "battles" of the French troops at the Battle of the Golden Spurs in 1302, where the French army was led by his elder half-brother Robert II, Count of Artois. He was able to escape when the French were routed by the Flemings, but his brother Jacques, elder half-brother Robert, and many of his relatives were killed.

== Sources ==
- Binski, Paul; Panayotova, Stella, eds. (2007). The Cambridge Illuminations: The Conference Papers. Harvey Miller. ISBN 9781905375172.
- Bradbury, Jim (2007). The Capetians:Kings of France, 987-1328. Hambledon Continuum.
- Campbell, Anna (2017). "Franciscan Nuns in England, the Minoress Foundations and Their Patrons, 1281-1367". In Robson, Michael J.P. (ed.). The English Province of the Franciscans (1224-c.1350). Brill. pp. 426–447.
- Golden, Judith K. (2002). "Instructional Images and the Life of St. Eustace". In Hourihane, Colum (ed.). Insights and Interpretations. Princeton University Press. ISBN 9780691099903.
- Russell, Delbert W. (2013). "The Cultural Context of the French Prose "remaniement" of the Life of Edward the Confessor by a nun of Barking Abbey". In Wogan-Browne, Jocelyn (ed.). Language and Culture in Medieval Britain: The French of England, C.1100-c.1500. Boydell & Brewer. pp. 290–302.
- Sargent-Baur, Barbara N. (1999). Philippe de Remi, Le Roman de la Manekine. Rodopi.

Preceded by Hugh VI	Count of Saint Pol; 1292–1317	Succeeded by John II
