= Beatrice of England =

13th-century English princess and duchess of Brittany

- Countess of Richmond
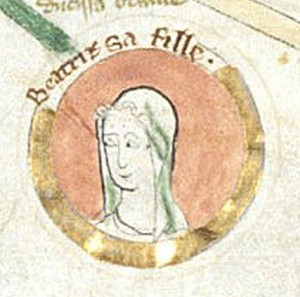
- Born: 25 June 1242; Bordeaux, France
- Died: 24 March 1275 (aged 32); London, England
- Burial: Grey Friars Church, London
- Spouse: John II, Duke of Brittany (m. 1260)
- Issue: Arthur II, Duke of Brittany; John, Earl of Richmond; Marie, Countess of Saint Pol; Peter, Viscount of Leon; Blanche, Countess of Artois; Eleanor of Brittany, Abbess of Fontevrault
- House: Plantagenet
- Father: Henry III, King of England
- Mother: Eleanor of Provence

Beatrice of England (25 June 1242 – 24 March 1275) was a member of the House of Plantagenet, the daughter of Henry III of England and Eleanor of Provence. She married John de Dreux, heir to the duchy of Brittany.

== Childhood ==
Born 25 June 1242, Beatrice was the second-eldest daughter of King Henry III of England and Eleanor of Provence. Beatrice's childhood was plagued by tragedy, and by the stresses of her father's reign coupled with her mother's unpopularity with the English people.

== Marriage and issue ==
In 1256 the queen of Cyprus, Plaisance of Antioch, proposed that she marry Beatrice's brother Edmund Crouchback and that her son, King Hugh II of Cyprus, marry Beatrice.

At one point, Henry conducted negotiations for Beatrice to marry the king of France and also rejected a proposal that she should wed the son of the king of Norway. On 22 January 1260, when she was seventeen, she married John de Dreux, heir to the duchy of Brittany, at Saint-Denis. Beatrice and John had:

- Arthur II, Duke of Brittany (1261–1312)
- John of Brittany, Earl of Richmond (1266–1334)
- Marie of Brittany, Countess of Saint-Pol, wife of Guy III of Châtillon (1268–1339)
- Pierre, Viscount de Leon (1269–1312)
- Blanche of Brittany, wife of Philip of Artois (1271–1327)
- Eleanor of Brittany, Abbess of Fontevrault (1275–1342)

Beatrice

== Death ==
Beatrice died on 24 March 1275 in London, England. John II honoured his wife with a chantry, an institutional chapel on private land or within a greater church, which was to be finished when he died, so that he and Beatrice would be together again. Beatrice was buried at Greyfriars, London. (Note: Her burial is recorded in the London Greyfriar's register.) Beatrice died before her husband succeeded to the duchy, therefore she was never styled Duchess of Brittany.

== Historical overview ==
Though little information is available concerning Beatrice's activities, she was an important part of English history. Her marriage to John II helped forge an alliance with France, thus placing the Earldom of Richmond under the so-called shield of England.

During Henry's reign, there was much opposition to him in England. At a time when Simon de Montfort wanted to strip the king of some of his power to give more say to the barons, it was necessary for Henry to strengthen his rule via family marriages to useful people. His first daughter had married the king of Scotland, and Beatrice's marriage to John II, who controlled the Earldom of Richmond, gave Henry an additional source of power. Moreover, a substantial number of French nobles came to England and could be appointed to political positions.

When Henry was crowned, very few areas within the Angevin Empire (comprising Gascony, Béarn, Angoulême, Saintonge and Agenais), remained loyal to Henry.

The marriage of Beatrice and John II would prove to be useful for Henry III, if only to help Henry recover Poitou. Now Henry had English security and influence on the northern border, and the instance on English overlordship. Though Henry was planning on regaining Poitou, he was defeated after his campaign. Because he could not regain Poitou, his domains were small compared to the Angevin Empire. With his various strategies, Henry III reigned over England for 56 years until his death in 1272.

== Bibliography ==
- Armstrong, A. S. (2018). "'Sisters in cahoots: female agency in the marriage of Beatrice of England and John of Brittany'". Journal of Medieval History (44): (441) 439–456.
- Golden, Judith K. (2002). "Instructional Images and the Life of St. Eustace". In Hourihane, Colum (ed.). Insights and Interpretations. Princeton University Press.
- Howell, Margaret (1992). "The Children of King Henry III and Eleanor of Provence". In Coss, Peter R.; Lloyd, S.D. (eds.). Thirteenth Century England IV: Proceedings of the Newcastle Upon Tyne. The Boydell Press.
- Kingsford, C L (1915). "Register of the Grey Friars of London: Index of those buried in the church and cloister (A-K)', in The Grey Friars of London (Aberdeen, 1915)". pp. 134–139.
- Lloyd, Simon D. (1 July 1989). Jones, Michael (ed.). England and her Neighbours, 1066-1453: Essays in Honour of Pierre Chaplais. Bloomsbury Publishing. ISBN 978-0-8264-3374-9.
- Morvan, Frederic (2009). La Chevalerie bretonne et la formation de l'armee ducale, 1260-1341 (in French). Presses Universitaires de Rennes. ISBN 978-2-7535-0827-9.
- Vincent, Nicholas (2001). The Holy Blood: King Henry III and the Westminster Blood Relic. Cambridge University Press.
- Waugh, Scott L. (1988). The Lordship of England: Royal Wardships and Marriages in English Society and Politics, 1217–1327. Princeton University Press.
