= John II of Brittany =

Duke of Brittany from 1286 to 1305

John II
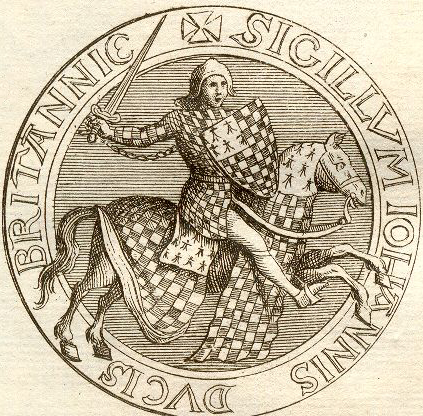

Duke of Brittany
- Reign: 8 October 1286 – 18 November 1305
- Predecessor: John I
- Successor: Arthur II
- Born: 3/4 January 1239
- Died: 18 November 1305 (aged 66); Lyon, Kingdom of Arles
- Burial: Notre-Dame des Carmes
- Spouse: Beatrice of England (m. 1260; died 1275)
- Issue: Arthur II, Duke of Brittany; John, 1st Earl of Richmond; Marie, Countess of Saint Pol; Peter, Viscount of Leon; Blanche, Countess of Artois; Eleanor, Abbess of Fontevrault
- House: Dreux
- Father: John I, Duke of Brittany
- Mother: Blanche of Navarre

John II (Breton: Yann; French: Jean; 3/4 January 1239 – 18 November 1305) reigned as Duke of Brittany from 1286 until his death, and was also Earl of Richmond in the Peerage of England. He took part in two crusades prior to his accession to the ducal throne. As a duke, John was involved in the conflicts between the kings of France and England. He was crushed to death in an accident during the celebrations of a papal coronation.

== Life ==
John was the eldest son of Duke John I of Brittany and Blanche of Navarre. On 22 January 1260, he married Beatrice, a daughter of King Henry III of England. John was very close to his brother-in-law, Edward I. In 1271, he accompanied Edward to the Ninth Crusade, meeting there with his father and King Louis IX of France. Louis succumbed to an illness in Tunis, and John's father returned to Brittany. John, however, followed Edward to Palestine. The crusade ended the following year, having achieved little. In 1285, John took part in the Aragonese Crusade at the side of King Philip III of France.

Upon the death of his father on 8 October 1286, John succeeded him as duke of Brittany, inheriting also the Earldom of Richmond in the Peerage of England. His namesake son was governing Aquitaine in the name of his uncle Edward I, when King Philip IV declared Edward's rule forfeit in May 1294 after Edward's refusal to stand before the Parlement of Paris over fishing disputes the previous year that had escalated into naval warfare between the two countries. John assisted his brother-in-law in the ensuing Gascon War but suffered only defeats. When the English army sought to recover by plundering the Breton Abbaye Saint-Mathieu de Fine-Terre in 1296, however, John abandoned Edward's cause. In response, Edward deprived him of the earldom. John proceeded to ally himself with the French, arranging a marriage between his grandson John and King Philip's cousin Isabella of Valois. Philip then raised him into the Peerage of France in September 1297. During the negotiations over the final Treaty of Paris ending the war, John was among Philip's chief negotiators with the English.

From 1294 until 1304, John assisted the King of France in his campaign against Count Guy of Flanders, taking part in the decisive Battle of Mons-en-Pévèle. Following King Philip's victory, in 1305, John travelled to Lyon to attend the coronation of Pope Clement V. John was leading the Pope's horse through the crowd during the celebrations. So many spectators had piled atop the walls that one of them crumbled and collapsed on top of the Duke. He died four days later, on 18 November. His body was placed in a lead coffin and sent down the Loire. He was buried on 16 December in the Carmelite convent he had founded in Ploërmel.

== Issue ==
John and Beatrice had six children, several of whom were raised at the English court of their uncle Edward I.

- Arthur II, Duke of Brittany (1262–1312)
- John, Earl of Richmond (c. 1266–1334)
- Marie, wife of Guy III of Châtillon (1268–1339)
- Peter, Viscount of Leon (1269–1312)
- Blanche, wife of Philip of Artois (1271–1327)
- Eleanor of Brittany, Abbess of Fontevrault (1275–1342)

== See also ==
- Dukes of Brittany family tree

John II of Brittany House of Dreux Cadet branch of the Capetian dynasty Born: 1239 Died: 18 November 1305
Regnal titles
Preceded by John I	Duke of Brittany; 1286–1305	Succeeded by Arthur II
Peerage of England
Preceded by John	Earl of Richmond; 1268–1305	Vacant Forfeited Title next held by John
