= J. R. S. Phillips =

British historian

John Roland Seymour Phillips (born 1940) is a British historian and academic. He did a Doctor of Philosophy degree at the University of London in 1967, on the subject of the 14th-century Earl of Pembroke, Aymer de Valence. Later he published a book on the same subject. Phillips was head of the department of medieval history, at the University College Dublin. Today he is professor emeritus at that university. In 2010, Phillips contributed a volume on King Edward II to the Yale English Monarchs series.

== Select publications ==
- Aymer de Valence, Earl of Pembroke 1307–1324. Oxford: Oxford University Press. 1972. ISBN 0-19-822359-5. OCLC 426691.
- The Medieval Expansion of Europe. Oxford: Oxford University Press. 1988. ISBN 0-19-219232-9.
- Edward II. New Haven and London: Yale University Press. 2010. ISBN 978-0-300-15657-7.
