= John Maddicott =

English historian

John Maddicott FSA FRHistS FBA
- Born: John Robert Lewendon Maddicott; July 22, 1943 (age 83)

Academic background
- Education: Worcester College, Oxford

Academic work
- Discipline: History
- Sub-discipline: Medieval history; political history; social history; England in the Late Middle Ages; Anglo-Saxon
- Institutions: University of Manchester; Exeter College, Oxford
- Main interests: Political and Social History; Anglo-Saxon Economy
- Notable works: Thomas of Lancaster, 1307-22 (1970); Simon de Montfort (1994); The Origins of the English Parliament, 924-1327 (2010)

John Robert Lewendon Maddicott (born 22 July 1943) is an English historian who has published works on the political and social history of England in the 13th and 14th centuries, and has also written a number of leading articles on the Anglo-Saxon economy, his second area of interest.

Born in Exeter, Devon, he was educated at Worcester College, Oxford. He has written a biography of Thomas, 2nd Earl of Lancaster, and one on Simon de Montfort, 6th Earl of Leicester. In Hilary term 2004, he delivered the Ford Lectures, the most prestigious history lectures in Oxford University, on the topic of the genesis of the English Parliament. He taught at the University of Manchester and was a fellow and tutor in history at Exeter College, Oxford, from 1969 until 2006. An elected Fellow of the British Academy (FBA), he was also joint editor of the English Historical Review from 1990 to 2000. In 2001 he delivered the British Academy's Raleigh Lecture on History.

== Selected publications ==
- Thomas of Lancaster, 1307-22: A Study in the Reign of Edward II. (Oxford, 1970)
- "The English Peasantry and the Demands of the Crown, 1294-1341", Past and Present. Vol Supplement No. 1 (1975)
- "Trade, Industry and the Wealth of King Alfred", Past and Present. Vol 123 (1989) JSTOR 650989
- Simon de Montfort. (Cambridge, 1994)
- 'An Infinite Multitude of Nobles': Quality, Quantity and Politics in the Pre-Reform Parliaments of Henry III, in Thirteenth Century England, vii (1999), pp. 17–46
- "Power and prosperity in the Age of Bede and Beowulf", Proceedings of the British Academy. (2002)
- The Origins of the English Parliament, 924-1327. (Oxford, 2010)
