= 1327 =

1327 in various calendars
- Gregorian calendar: 1327; MCCCXXVII
- Ab urbe condita: 2080
- Armenian calendar: 776; ԹՎ ՉՀԶ
- Assyrian calendar: 6077
- Balinese saka calendar: 1248–1249
- Bengali calendar: 733–734
- Berber calendar: 2277
- English Regnal year: 20 Edw. 2 – 1 Edw. 3
- Buddhist calendar: 1871
- Burmese calendar: 689
- Byzantine calendar: 6835–6836
- Chinese calendar: 丙寅年 (Fire Tiger); 4024 or 3817 — to — 丁卯年 (Fire Rabbit); 4025 or 3818
- Coptic calendar: 1043–1044
- Discordian calendar: 2493
- Ethiopian calendar: 1319–1320
- Hebrew calendar: 5087–5088
- Hindu calendars
- Vikram Samvat: 1383–1384
- Shaka Samvat: 1248–1249
- Kali Yuga: 4427–4428
- Holocene calendar: 11327
- Igbo calendar: 327–328
- Iranian calendar: 705–706
- Islamic calendar: 727–728
- Japanese calendar: Karyaku 2 (嘉暦２年)
- Javanese calendar: 1238–1240
- Julian calendar: 1327; MCCCXXVII
- Korean calendar: 3660
- Minguo calendar: 585 before ROC 民前585年
- Nanakshahi calendar: −141
- Thai solar calendar: 1869–1870
- Tibetan calendar: མེ་ཕོ་སྟག་ལོ་ (male Fire-Tiger); 1453 or 1072 or 300 — to — མེ་མོ་ཡོས་ལོ་ (female Fire-Hare); 1454 or 1073 or 301

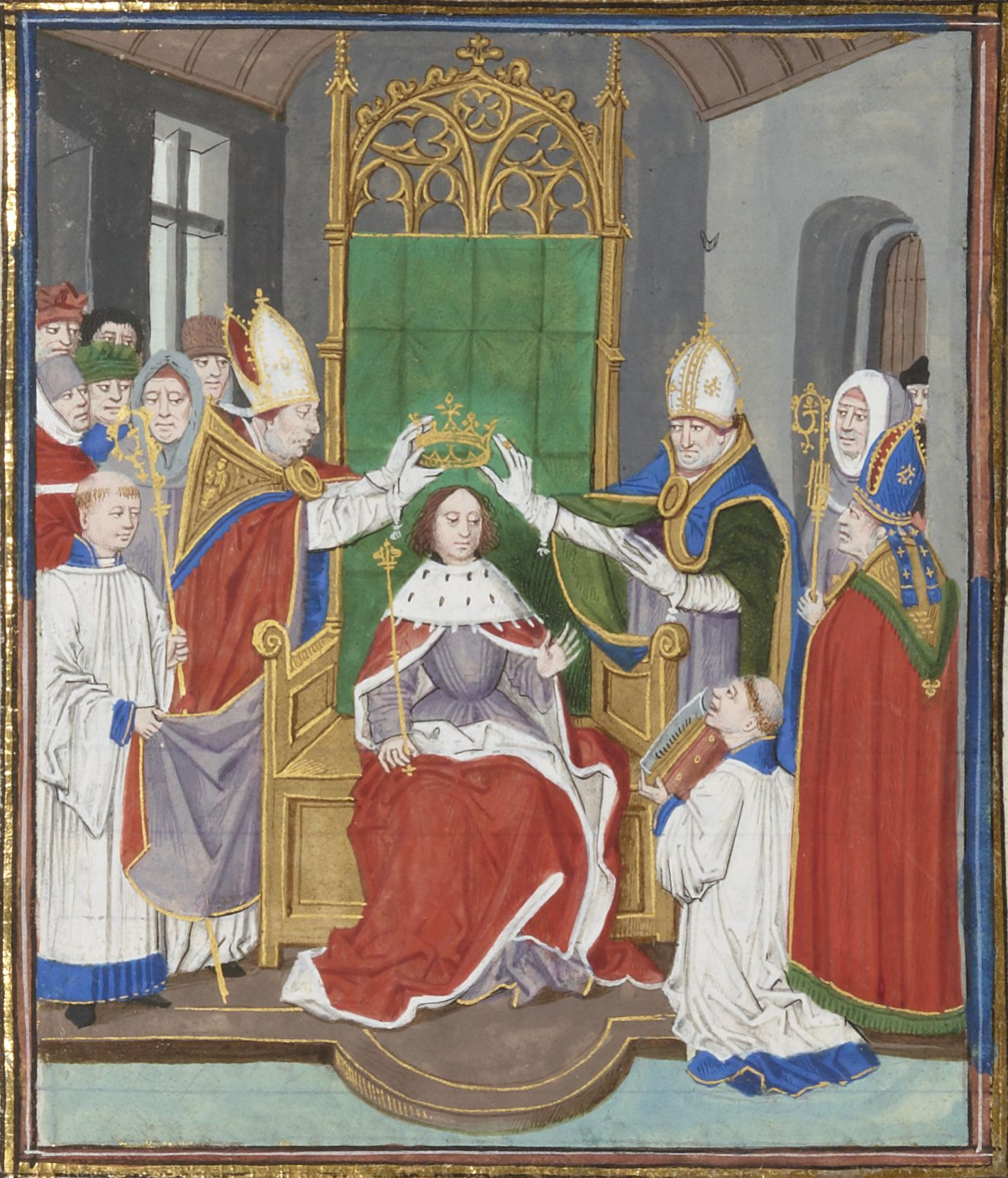
The coronation of Edward III as King of England on February 1, 1327

Year 1327 (MCCCXXVII) was a common year starting on Thursday of the Julian calendar.

== Events ==
=== January – March ===
- January 13 – In Spain, Marinid Prince Uthman ibn Abi al-Ula, who started an uprising the year before against the Emirate of Granada and its ruler Muhammad IV, arrives at Almería and proceeds to enlist Abu Abdallah Muhammad ibn Abi Sa'id, Muhammad IV's uncle, to be installed as the new Emir, with the name al-Qa'im bi-amr Allah.
- January 20 – Imprisoned in Warwickshire, King Edward II of England is forced to abdicate by his estranged wife, Queen Isabella, and her lover, Roger Mortimer.
- January 25 – The 14-year-old Crown Prince, Edward, is proclaimed King of England in London, with his mother Isabella serving as his regent.
- February 1 – The coronation of King Edward III as ruler of England takes place at Westminster Abbey with the approval of the English Parliament. Walter Reynolds, Archbishop of Canterbury, places the crown upon the new King.
- February 5 (1st waning of Kason 684 ME, Burmese calendar) – In Burma (modern Myanmar), Tarabya I becomes the new King of Sagaing, located in northern Myanmar on the Irrawaddy River with a capital in the city of Sagaing. Tarabya succeeds his brother, upon the death of his brother, King Saw Yun, despite the fact that Saw Yun has an heir, Prince Kyaswa.
- February 8 – At Opava (in the modern-day Czech Republic), the Polish Silesian noble Casimir I, Duke of Cieszyn swears homage to King John of Bohemia, "the Blind". In return, Casimir is granted Oświęcim (Auschwitz) as a fiefdom on February 23.
- February 13
  - King Charles I of Hungary and King John of Bohemia sign an alliance agreement at Nagyszombat in Bohemia (modern Trnava in the Republic of Slovakia), to proceed against the Austrian Habsburgs who occupy Pressburg (modern Bratislava, capital of Slovakia).
  - In Bavaria, a large fire breaks out in Munich and is not brought under control for two days. One-third of the buildings in the city are destroyed.
- February 19 – Other Silesian nobles follow the example of Casimir of Cieszyn at Opava and swear homage to King John of Bohemia, including the Piast nobles Leszek of Racibórz, Siemowit of Bytom and George of Bytom.
- March 31 – King Charles IV of France makes a peace treaty with England. He returns Aquitaine and Gascony to English rule. Charles receives 50,000 livres. The territories of Limousin, Quercy and Périgord county come under control of France.

=== April – June ===
- April 4 – In the civil war in Granada, Prince Uthman ibn Abi al-Ula captures the fortress of Laujar de Andarax (in the modern-day Almeria province of Spain).
- April 5 – Edward II is moved to Berkeley Castle in Gloucestershire. He is kept under the custody of Roger Mortimer's son-in-law, Thomas Berkeley, and John Maltravers, who are given £5 a day to look after him. Despite records showing luxury goods being bought for him, Edward is possibly mistreated by his captors.
- April 6 (Good Friday) – Francesco Petrarca, Italian scholar and poet, sees a woman he names Laura (possibly Laura de Noves) in the church of Sainte-Claire d'Avignon, which awakes in him a lasting passion. He writes a series of sonnets and other poems in Italian dedicated to her, which are collected into Il Canzoniere, an influential model for Renaissance culture.
- May 31 – In Milan, Louis IV ("Ludwig the Bavarian"), King of the Romans, becomes the first King of Italy since 1313, when Henry VII, Holy Roman Emperor died. Louis is enthroned as King Ludovico IV, the third king with that name (Louis the Blind had ruled as Ludovico III from 900 to 905).
- June 21 – Queen Ingeborg of Norway marries the Danish nobleman Canute Porse the Elder, but is deposed from political power in Norway.

=== July – September ===
- July 4 – During a banquet given by Galeazzo I Visconti in Milan, an attempt is apparently made to poison the guest of honor, Louis IV, newly crowned as King of Italy. Galeazzo's brother, Stefano Visconti, becomes ill after tasting food and drink intended for Louis and dies suddenly at home. Stefano's brothers Galeazzo, Giovanni, and Luchino, along with his nephew Azzone Visconti, are all imprisoned on orders of the Holy Roman Emperor based on accusations of a fourth brother, Marco Visconti.
- August 25 – Demasq Kaja, Viceroy of Azerbaijan and of Iraq in the Ilkhanate, the Mongol Empire's area of control in the Middle East, is killed in Soltaniyeh after trying to escape arrest on orders of the Ilkhan, Abu Sa'id Bahadur Khan. Abu Sa'id had concluded that Demasq's father, Amir Chūpān, was attempting to take over the Ilkhanate.
- September 21 – Less than a year after his arrest, the former King of England, Edward II, dies, probably murdered, in Berkeley Castle in Gloucestershire.

=== October – December ===
- October 23 – Pope John XXII condemns Marsilius of Padua's 1324 treatise Defensor pacis (The Defender of Peace). The excommunicated Marsilius flees to Germany and seeks protection at the court of King Louis IV. John also excommunicates Louis and demands that he relinquishes his claim to the imperial crown.
- October 27 – Elizabeth de Burgh, Queen consort of Scotland as the wife of King Robert the Bruce, is fatally injured when she falls from her horse while traveling with her entourage to Cullen Castle in Banffshire.
- November 5 – In Barcelona, Prince Alfonso "the Kind" becomes the new King of Aragon upon the death of his father, King Jaime II, and is enthroned as King Alfonso IV.
- December 11 – Simon Mepeham is elected as England's new Archbishop of Canterbury as the candidate of the Earl of Lancaster, leader of the regency council. Mepeham defeats the candidate supported by Queen Isabella and Roger Mortimer, and soon works with King Edward III to end Mortimer's power in England.
- December 18 – Pope John XXII appoints 10 new Roman Catholic cardinals, the most during his papacy, including Jacques Fournier, who will succeed John as Pope Benedict XII in 1334.
- December 20 – The late King Edward II of England is buried in the Gloucester Cathedral in Gloucestershire, three months after his death.
- December 22 – Ala ud-Din Timurtash, the Viceroy for Anatolia within the Ilkhanate of the Middle East, and the brother of Demasq Kaja, learns that the Ilkhan Abu Sa'id had arranged for the execution of Demasq. Fearing for his own safety, Timurtash decides to leave and eventually flees to Egypt, but will be executed there on August 12, 1328.

=== By topic ===
==== Literature ====
- Richard of Wallingford, English cleric and abbot, describes the construction of an astronomical clock in his Tractatus Horologii Astronomici.

==== Trade and Transport ====
- In China, the Grand Canal, which runs from Beijing to Hangzhou over a distance of 1,800 km, is completed.

== Births ==
- June – Malatesta Ungaro, Italian condottiero (d. 1372)
- October 30 – Andrew, Duke of Calabria (d. 1345)
- date unknown
  - Charles de La Cerda, Franco-Spanish soldier (d. 1354)
  - Elizabeth le Despenser, Baroness Berkeley, English noble (d. 1389)
  - Demetrius I Starshy, Prince of Trubczewsk (d. 1399)
  - Birger Gregersson, Archbishop of Uppsala (d. 1383)
  - Baldus de Ubaldis, Italian jurist (d. 1400)
- probable – William Douglas, 1st Earl of Douglas, Scottish nobleman (d. 1384)

== Deaths ==
- January 16 – Nikephoros Choumnos, Byzantine scholar and statesman (b. 1250 or 1255)
- January 29 – Adolf, Count Palatine of the Rhine (b. 1300)
- March 15 – Albert of Schwarzburg, German grand preceptor of the Knights Hospitaller
- April 9 – Walter Stewart, 6th High Steward of Scotland (b. 1293)
- May 28 – Robert Baldock, Lord Privy Seal and Lord Chancellor of England
- May 29 – Jens Grand, Danish archbishop (b. c. 1260)
- July 4 – Stefano Visconti, Milanese nobleman
- August 25 – Demasq Kaja, Ilkhanate member of the Chobanid Family
- September 1 – Foulques de Villaret, French Grand Master of the Knights Hospitaller
- September 21 – Edward Caernarfon, former King of England (b. 1284)
- September 26 – Cecco d'Ascoli, Italian encyclopaedist, physician and poet (b. 1257)
- October 20 – Teresa d'Entença, Countess of Urgell (b. 1300)
- October 27 – Elizabeth de Burgh, queen of Robert the Bruce
- November – Chupan, Chobanid prince of the Ilkhanate
- November 2 or November 5 – King James II of Aragon (b. 1267)
- December 19 – Agnes of France, Duchess of Burgundy
- date unknown
  - Thomas Cobham, Bishop of Worcester
  - Constantine I of Imereti
  - David of Hrodna, Lithuanian military leader
  - Vital du Four, French theologian (b. 1260)
  - Walter Reynolds, Archbishop of Canterbury
  - Sir Richard de Exeter, Anglo-Irish knight
- probable – Bartholomew of Lucca, Italian historian

== In fiction ==
- The action of Umberto Eco's novel The Name of the Rose (Il Nome della Rosa, 1980) takes place during this year.
