= Bad Laws =

2010 book by Philip Johnston

Bad Laws: An Explosive Analysis of Britain's Petty Rules, Health and Safety Lunacies, and Madcap Laws
- Author: Philip Johnson
- Publication date: 2010
- ISBN: 9781849014304

Bad Laws: An Explosive Analysis of Britain's Petty Rules, Health and Safety Lunacies, and Madcap Laws is a book written by Philip Johnston and published by Constable in 2010. Foster thought it expert and merciless. Appleton called it "thorough and persuasive".

== See also ==
- Dumb laws
- Law reform
