= Roger de Rowell =

English university chancellor

Roger de Rowell (also Rodwell or Rodewell) was an English medieval university chancellor.

During 1283–4, Roger de Rowell was Chancellor of the University of Oxford. At the end of time as Chancellor, there was a controversy between the University and the Bishop of Lincoln, Oliver Sutton.

Academic offices
Preceded by William de Montfort	Chancellor of the University of Oxford; 1283–1284	Succeeded by William Pikerell
