= William Pikerell =

English university chancellor

William Pikerell (also Pickerill) was an English medieval university chancellor.

During 1284–5, Pikerell was Chancellor of the University of Oxford.

Academic offices
Preceded by Roger de Rowell	Chancellor of the University of Oxford; 1284–1285	Succeeded by Hervey de Saham
