= Ordinances of 1311 =

Restrictions on Edward II of England's power

- Act of Parliament
- Parliament of England
- Long title: Les noveles Ordenances
- Citation: 5 Edw. 2
- Territorial extent: England and Wales; Ireland

Dates
- Royal assent: 1311
- Commencement: 1311
- Repealed: 20 October 1318

Other legislation
- Repealed by: Statute of York

Status: Repealed

Text of statute as originally enacted

The Ordinances of 1311 (The New Ordinances, Norman: Les noveles Ordenances) were a series of regulations imposed upon King Edward II by the peerage and clergy of the Kingdom of England to restrict the power of the English monarch. (Note: The Oxford English Dictionary defines an "ordinance" as of "narrower scope, less permanent nature, or less constitutional character than a law or statute.") The twenty-one signatories of the Ordinances are referred to as the Lords Ordainers, or simply the Ordainers. (Note: The word "ordainer" was used by contemporaries simply as a descriptive noun, not as a title. "Lords Ordainers" is not found until the 19th century.) English setbacks in the Scottish war, combined with perceived extortionate royal fiscal policies, set the background for the writing of the Ordinances in which the administrative prerogatives of the king were largely appropriated by a baronial council. The Ordinances reflect the Provisions of Oxford and the Provisions of Westminster from the late 1250s, but unlike the Provisions, the Ordinances featured a new concern with fiscal reform, specifically redirecting revenues from the king's household to the exchequer.

Just as instrumental to their conception were other issues, particularly discontent with the king's favourite, Piers Gaveston, whom the barons subsequently banished from the realm. Edward II accepted the Ordinances only under coercion, and a long struggle for their repeal ensued that did not end until Earl Thomas of Lancaster, the leader of the Ordainers, was executed in 1322.

== Background ==
=== Early problems ===
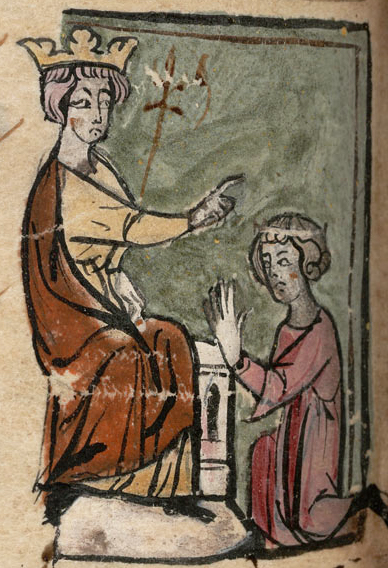
Edward I blessing his son – the future Edward II – prince of Wales.

When Edward II succeeded his father Edward I on 7 July 1307, the attitude of his subjects was generally one of goodwill towards their new king. However, discontent was brewing beneath the surface. Some of this was due to existing problems left behind by the late king, while much was due to the new king's inadequacies. The problems were threefold. First there was discontent with the royal policy for financing wars. To finance the war in Scotland, Edward I had increasingly resorted to so-called prises – or purveyance – to provision the troops with victuals. The peers felt that the purveyance had become far too burdensome and compensation was in many cases inadequate or missing entirely. In addition, they did not like the fact that Edward II took prises for his household without continuing the war effort against Scotland, causing the second problem. While Edward I had spent the last decade of his reign relentlessly campaigning against the Scots, his son abandoned the war almost entirely. In this situation, the Scottish king Robert Bruce soon took the opportunity to regain what had been lost. This not only exposed the north of England to Scottish attacks, but also jeopardised the possessions of the English baronage in Scotland.

The third and most serious problem concerned the king's favourite, Piers Gaveston. Gaveston was a Gascon of relatively humble origins, with whom the king had developed a particularly close relationship. (Note: Much speculation has centred on whether Edward and Gaveston's relation was of a homosexual nature. An in-depth discussion of this issue – and an alternative to the predominant view – is presented by P. Chaplais.) Among the honours Edward heaped upon Gaveston was the earldom of Cornwall, a title which had previously only been conferred on members of the royal family. The preferential treatment of an upstart like Gaveston, in combination with his behaviour that was seen as arrogant, led to resentment among the established peers of the realm. This resentment first came to the surface in a declaration written in Boulogne by a group of magnates who were with the king when he was in France for his marriage ceremony to the French king's daughter. The so-called Boulogne agreement was vague, but it expressed clear concern over the state of the royal court. On 25 February 1308, the new king was crowned. The oath he was made to take at the coronation differed from that of previous kings in the fourth clause; here Edward was required to promise to maintain the laws that the community "shall have chosen" ("aura eslu"). Though it is unclear what exactly was meant by this wording at the time, this oath was later used in the struggle between the king and his earls.

=== Gaveston’s exile ===
In the parliament of April 1308, it was decided that Gaveston should be banned from the realm upon threat of excommunication. The king had no choice but to comply, and on 24 June, Gaveston left the country on appointment as Lieutenant of Ireland. The king immediately started plotting for his favourite's return. At the parliament of April 1309, he suggested a compromise in which certain of the earls' petitions would be met in exchange for Gaveston's return. The plan came to nothing, but Edward had strengthened his hand for the Stamford parliament in July later that year by receiving a papal annulment of the threat of excommunication. The king agreed to the so-called "Statute of Stamford" (which in essence was a reissue of the Articuli super Cartas that his father had signed in 1300), and Gaveston was allowed to return.

The earls who agreed to the compromise were hoping that Gaveston had learned his lesson. Yet upon his return, he was more arrogant than ever, conferring insulting nicknames on some of the greater nobles. (Note: According to contemporary sources, he called the Earl of Warwick "the black dog of Arden".) When the king summoned a great council in October, several of the earls refused to meet due to Gaveston's presence. At the parliament of February in the following year, Gaveston was ordered not to attend. The earls disobeyed a royal order not to carry arms to parliament, and in full military attire presented a demand to the king for the appointment of a commission of reform. On 16 March 1310, the king agreed to the appointment of Ordainers, who were to be in charge of the reform of the royal household.

== Lords Ordainers ==
The Ordainers were elected by an assembly of magnates, without representation from the commons. (Note: The Ordainers were chosen by indirect election; the barons elected two bishops while the bishops elected two barons. These four then elected two more barons, and these six finally co-opted the remaining fifteen. The process built on that behind the Provisions of Oxford of 1258.) They were a diverse group, consisting of eight earls, seven bishops and six barons – twenty-one in all. (Note: The Ordainers were: the Earls of Lincoln, Pembroke, Gloucester, Lancaster, Hereford, Richmond, Warwick and Arundel; the Archbishop of Canterbury, the bishops of Chichester, London, Salisbury, Norwich, St. David's and Llandaff; and the barons Hugh de Vere, Hugh de Courtenay, Robert FitzRoger, John de Gray, William Marshall and William Martin, as well as Robert Clifford, who replaced FitzRoger on the latter's death. Neither McKisack or Prestwich supplies a complete list; while Prestwich omits the Bishops of Chichester and Norwich, McKisack fails to include Gray, and FitzRoger as the original appointee.) There were faithful royalists represented as well as fierce opponents of the king.

Among the Ordainers considered loyal to Edward II was John of Brittany, Earl of Richmond who was also by this time one of the older remaining earls. John had served Edward I, his uncle, and was Edward II's first cousin. The natural leader of the group was Henry Lacy, Earl of Lincoln. One of the wealthiest men in the country, he was also the oldest of the earls and had proved his loyalty and ableness through long service to Edward I. Lincoln had a moderating influence on the more extreme members of the group, but with his death in February 1311, leadership passed to his son-in-law and heir Thomas of Lancaster. Lancaster – the king's cousin – was now in possession of five earldoms which made him by far the wealthiest man in the country, save the king. There is no evidence that Lancaster was in opposition to the king in the early years of the king's reign, but by the time of the Ordinances it is clear that something had negatively affected his opinion of King Edward. (Note: The traditional view is that the breach was caused by the ejection from court of one of Lancaster's dependants, on Gaveston's instigation. Maddicott points out that even though this event took place, it happened later – after Lancaster's defection.)

Lancaster's main ally was Guy Beauchamp, Earl of Warwick. Warwick was the most fervently and consistently antagonistic of the earls, and remained so until his early death in 1315. Other earls were more amenable. Gilbert de Clare, Earl of Gloucester, was Gaveston's brother-in-law and stayed loyal to the king. Aymer de Valence, Earl of Pembroke, would later be one of the king's most central supporters, yet at this point he found the most prudent course of action was to go along with the reformers. Of the barons, at least Robert Clifford and William Marshall seemed to have royalist leanings.

Among the bishops, only two stood out as significant political figures, the more prominent of whom was Robert Winchelsey, Archbishop of Canterbury. Long a formidable presence in English public life, Winchelsey had led the struggle against Edward I to uphold the autonomy of the church, and for this he had paid with suspension and exile. One of Edward II's first acts as king had been to reinstate Winchelsey, but rather than responding with grateful loyalty, the archbishop soon reassumed a leadership role in the fight against the king. Although he was trying to appease Winchelsey, the king carried an old grudge against another prelate, Walter Langton, Bishop of Lichfield. Edward had Langton dismissed from his position as treasurer of the Exchequer and had his temporal possessions confiscated. Langton had been an opponent of Winchelsey during the previous reign, but Edward II's move against Langton drew the two Ordainers together.

== Ordinances ==
Six preliminary ordinances were released immediately upon the appointment of the Ordainers – on 19 March 1310 (Note: These preliminary Ordinances were concerned, among other things, with royal grants, payment of customs, and the maintenance of Magna Carta, reflected in the later paragraphs 3, 4 and 6; see below.) – but it was not until August 1311 that the committee had finished its work. In the meanwhile Edward had been in Scotland on an aborted campaign, but on 16 August, Parliament met in London, and the king was presented with the Ordinances.

The document containing the Ordinances is dated 5 October, and contains forty-one articles. In the preamble, the Ordainers voiced their concern over what they perceived as the evil councillors of the king, the precariousness of the military situation abroad, and the danger of rebellion at home over the oppressive prises. The articles can be divided into different groups, the largest of which deals with limitations on the powers of the king and his officials, and the substitution of these powers with baronial control. It was ordained that the king should appoint his officers only "by the counsel and assent of the baronage, and that in parliament." Furthermore, the king could no longer go to war without the consent of the baronage, nor could he make reforms of the coinage. Additionally, it was decided that parliament should be held at least once a year. Parallel to these decisions were reforms of the royal finances. The Ordinances banned what was seen as extortionate prises and customs, and at the same time declared that revenues were to be paid directly into the Exchequer. This was a reaction to the rising trend of receiving revenues directly into the royal household; making all royal finances accountable to the exchequer allowed greater public scrutiny.

Other articles dealt with punishing specific persons, foremost among these, Piers Gaveston. Article 20 describes at length the offences committed by Gaveston; he was once more condemned to exile and was to abjure the realm by 1 November. The bankers of the Italian Frescobaldi company were arrested, and their goods seized. It was held that the king's great financial dependence on the Italians was politically unfortunate. The last individuals to be singled out for punishment were Henry de Beaumont and his sister, Isabella de Vesci, two foreigners associated with the king's household. Though it is difficult to say why these two received particular mention, it could be related to the central position of their possessions in the Scottish war.

The Ordainers also took care to confirm and elaborate on existing statutes, and reforms were made to the criminal law. The liberties of the church were confirmed as well. To ensure that none of the Ordainers should be swayed in their decisions by bribes from the king, restrictions were made on what royal gifts and offices they were allowed to receive during their tenure.

== Aftermath ==
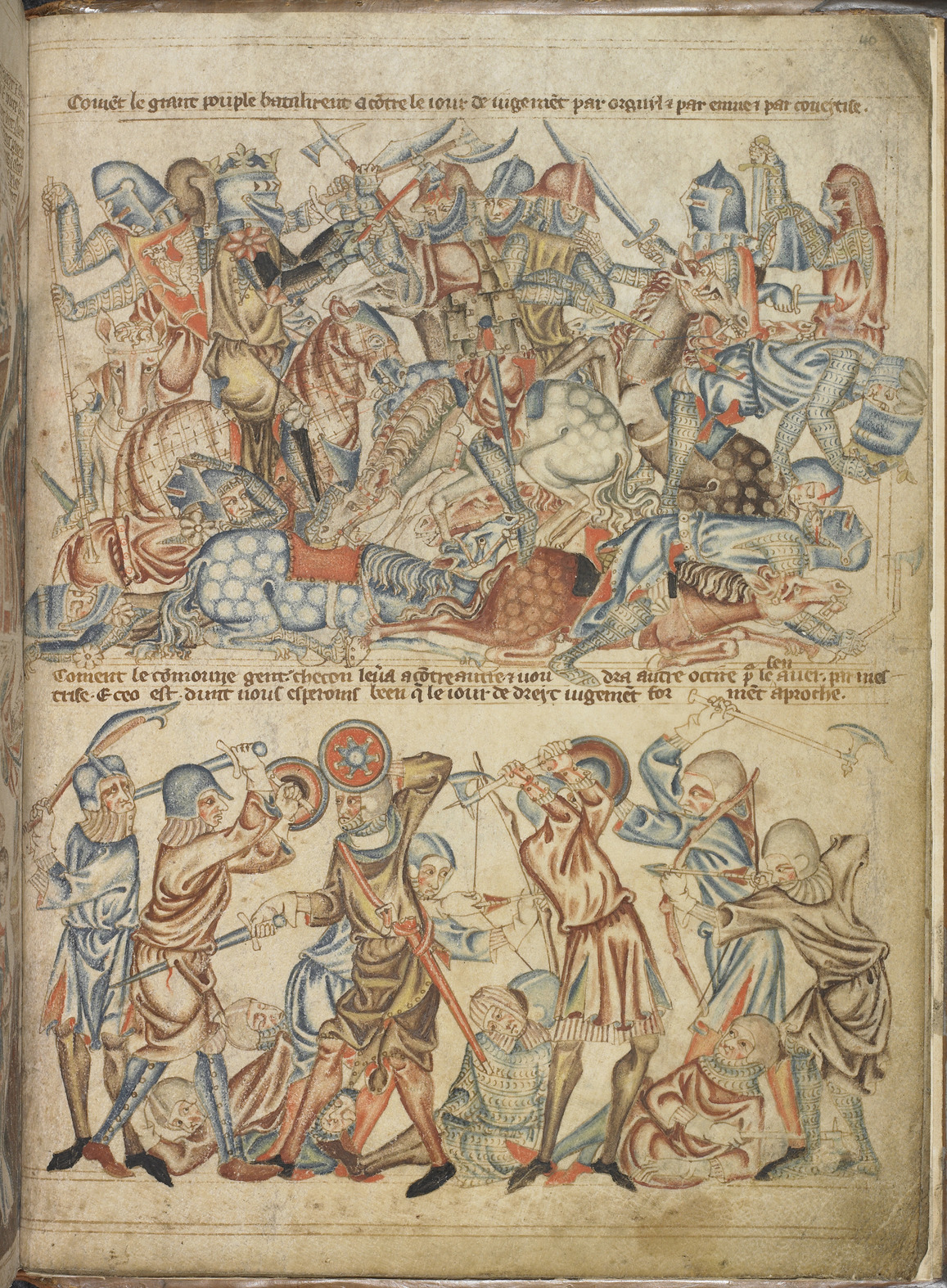
Scene from the Battle of Bannockburn in the Holkham Bible, 1327–35

The Ordinances were published widely on 11 October, with the intention of obtaining maximum popular support. The decade following their publication saw a constant struggle over their repeal or continued existence. Although they were not finally repealed until May 1322, the vigour with which they were enforced depended on who was in control of government.

Before the end of the year, Gaveston had returned to England, and civil war appeared imminent. In May 1312, Gaveston was taken captive by the Earl of Pembroke, but Warwick and Lancaster had him abducted and executed after a mock trial. This affront to Pembroke's honour drove him irrevocably into the camp of the king, and thereby split the opposition. The brutality of the act initially drove Lancaster and his adherents away from the centre of power, but the Battle of Bannockburn, in June 1314, returned the initiative. Edward was humiliated by his disastrous defeat, while Lancaster and Warwick had not taken part in the campaign, claiming that it was carried out without the consent of the baronage, and, as such, in defiance of the Ordinances.

What followed was a period of virtual control of the government by Lancaster, yet increasingly – particularly after the death of Warwick in 1315 – he found himself isolated. In August 1318, the so-called "Treaty of Leake" established a modus vivendi between the parties, whereby the king was restored to power while promising to uphold the Ordinances. Lancaster still had differences with the king, though—particularly with the conduct of the new favourite, Hugh Despenser the younger, and Hugh's father. In 1322, full rebellion broke out which ended with Lancaster's defeat at the Battle of Boroughbridge and his execution shortly after during March 1322. At the parliament of May in the same year, the Ordinances were repealed by the Statute of York. However, six clauses were retained that concerned such issues as household jurisdiction and appointment of sheriffs. Any restrictions on royal power were unequivocally annulled.

The Ordinances were never again reissued, and therefore hold no permanent position in the legal history of England in the way that Magna Carta, for instance, does. The criticism has been against the conservative focus of the barons' role in national politics, ignoring the ascendancy of the commons. Yet the document, and the movement behind it, reflected new political developments in its emphasis on how assent was to be obtained by the barons in parliament. It was only a matter of time before it was generally acknowledged that the Commons were an integral part of that institution.

== See also ==
- History of the British constitution
- Royal prerogative
