= Walter Maidstone =

14th-century Bishop of Worcester

- Bishop of Worcester
- Church: Catholic Church
- Appointed: 1 October 1313
- Term ended: 28 March 1317
- Predecessor: Walter Reynolds
- Successor: Thomas Cobham

Orders
- Consecration: 7 October 1313

Personal details
- Died: 28 March 1317

Walter Maidstone was a medieval Bishop of Worcester. He was nominated on 1 October 1313 and consecrated on 7 October 1313. He died on 28 March 1317.

== Citations ==
Catholic Church titles
Preceded by Walter Reynolds	Bishop of Worcester; 1313–1317	Succeeded by Thomas Cobham
