= Hervey de Saham =

English Canon law jurist and university chancellor

Hervey de Saham (also Seham) was an English medieval Canon law jurist and university chancellor.

De Saham was a Professor of Canon law. He was Guardian of the Franciscans (or Friars Minor) in Oxfordshire. From 1285 to 1289, he was Chancellor of the University of Oxford.

Academic offices
Preceded by William Pikerell	Chancellor of the University of Oxford; 1285–1289	Succeeded by Robert Winchelsey
