= John de Ludlow =

13th-century English chancellor

John de Ludlow (also Ludlaw) was an English medieval university chancellor.

In 1290, John de Ludlow was Chancellor of the University of Oxford, resigning in the same year.

== See also ==
- Ludlow

Academic offices
Preceded by William de Kingescote	Chancellor of the University of Oxford; 1290	Succeeded by John of Monmouth
