= William de Montfort =

English jurist, singer, dean and university chancellor

William de Montfort (also Mountfort) was an English medieval Canon law jurist, singer, dean, and university chancellor. He was apparently the son of Peter de Montfort.

William de Montfort was a Professor or Doctor of Canon law. He was Chantor at Hereford Cathedral and for a time was prebendary of Inkberrow. During 1282–3, he was Chancellor of the University of Oxford. From 1285 to 1294 he was Dean of St Paul's Cathedral in London.

Academic offices
| Preceded by Henry de Stanton | Chancellor of the University of Oxford; 1282–1283 | Succeeded by Roger de Rowell |
