= Statute of York =

Act of the Parliament of England

- Act of Parliament
- Parliament of England
- Long title: Revocatio novarum Ordinationum.
- Citation: 12 Edw. 2
- Territorial extent: England and Wales; Ireland

Dates
- Royal assent: 1318
- Commencement: 20 October 1318 (Note: Start of session.)

Other legislation
- Repeals/revokes: Ordinances of 1311

Status: Current legislation

Text of statute as originally enacted

Revised text of statute as amended

Text of the Statute of York as in force today (including any amendments) within the United Kingdom, from legislation.gov.uk.

The Statute of York (Latin: Statutum Eborac') or the Revocation of the New Ordinances (Latin: Revocatio novarum Ordinationum) was an act of the Parliament of England passed in 1322 that repealed the Ordinances of 1311 and prevented any similar provisions from being established. Academics argue over the actual impact of the bill, but general consensus is that it made the idea that the House of Commons should be consulted on all matters of general interest. The statute is seen as "the end of a period of revolutionary experiments in English government", with no Ordinances ever attempted again.

== Background ==
The Ordinances of 1311 were provisions imposed upon King Edward II by the peerage and clergy of the Kingdom of England to restrict the power of the king. Edward's victory against his political opposition at the Battle of Boroughbridge on 16 March 1322, and the execution of the Earl of Lancaster 6 days later, gave him a large amount of freedom, and Parliament was summoned to meet at York on 2 May 1322 with a writ backdated to 2 days before Boroughbridge. Edward's first matter was "the statute on the repeal of the ordinances", though with the proviso of "putting of the good points of the Ordinances into a statute". Draft copies discovered in the Public Record Office indicate that the statute was originally only meant to repeal the Ordinances of 1311, with no additional provisions. The second draft, however, completely vindicated the idea of the royal prerogative, and prevented any similar Ordinances from being enacted, saying that "the Matters which are to be established for the Estate of our Lord the King and of his Heirs and for the Estate of the Realm and the People shall be treated accorded and established in Parliaments ... according as it hath been heretofore accustomed". As a result of the statute, the Ordinances were repealed, and no attempt was ever made to reintroduce them; this has been seen as "the end of a period of revolutionary experiments in English government".

Recital of the King's Commission, 16th March. 3 Edw. II. for making certain Ordinances. Ordinances made in 5 Edw. II. Examination of the said Ordinances in the Parliament Three Weeks after Easter 15 Edw. II. The said Ordinances shall cease and become of no Effect. Ordinances or Provisions concerning the King and the Realm, made by Subjects, shall be void: and none such shall be made except by the King, Lords, and Commons, in Parliament.

Whereas our Lord King Edward, Son of King Edward, on the Sixteenth Day of March in the Third Year of his Reign, to the Honour of God, and for the Weal of Himself and his Realm, did grant unto the Prelates, Earls, and Barons of his Realm, that they might choose certain Persons of the Prelates, Earls, and Barons, and of other lawful Men whom they should deem sufficient to be called unto them, for the ordaining and establishing the Estate of the Household of our said Lord the King, and of his Realm, according to Right and Reason, and in such Manner that their Ordinances should be made to the Honour of God, and to the Honour and Profit of Holy Church, and to the Honour of the said King, and to his Profit and to the Profit of his People, according to Right and Reason, and to the Oath which our said Lord the King made at his Coronation: And the Archbishop of Canterbury, Primate of all England, the Bishops, Earls, and Barons thereunto chosen, did make certain Ordinances which begin thus:

"Edward by the Grace of God, King of England, Lord of Ireland, and Duke of Aquitain, to All to whom these Letters shall come Greeting. Know Ye, That Whereas on the Sixteenth Day of March in the Third Year of our Reign, to the Honour of God, &c." and which end thus "Given at London the Fifth Day of October in the Fifth Year of our Reign."

The which Ordinances our said Lord the King, at his Parliament at York, in Three Weeks from Easter in the Fifteenth Year of his Reign, did, by the Prelates, Earls, and Barons, among whom were the more part of the said Ordainers who were then living, and by the Commonalty of his Realm, there by his Command assembled, cause to be rehearsed and examined: And forasmuch as upon that Examination it was found, in the said Parliament, that by the Matters so ordained the Royal Power of our said Lord the King was restrained in divers Things, contrary to what ought to be, to the blemishing of his Royal Sovereignty, and against the Estate of the Crown; And, also, forasmuch as, in Time past, by such Ordinances and Provisions, made Subjects against the Royal Power of the Ancestors of our Lord the King, Troubles and Wars have happened in the Realm, whereby the Land hath been in Peril, It is accorded and established, at the said Parliament, by our Lord the King, and by the said Prelates, Earls, and Barons, and the whole Commonalty of the Realm, at this Parliament assembled, That all the Things, by the said Ordainors ordained and contained in the said Ordinances, shall from henceforth for the Time to come cease and shall lose their Name, Force, Virtue, and Effect for ever; The Statutes and Establishments duly made by our Lord the King and his Ancestors, before the said Ordinances, abiding in their Force: And that for ever hereafter, all manner of Ordinances or Provisions, made by the Subjects of our Lord the King or of his Heirs, by any power or Authority whatsoever, concerning the Royal Power of our Lord the King or of his Heirs, or against the Estate of our said Lord the King or of his Heirs, or against the Estate of the Crown, shall be void and of no Avail or Force whatever; But the Matters which are to be established for the Estate of our Lord the King and of his Heirs, and for the Estate of the Realm and of the People, shall be treated, accorded, and established in Parliaments, by our Lord the King, and by the Assent of the Prelates, Earls, and Barons, and the Commonalty of the Realm; according as it hath been heretofore accustomed.

== Constitutional implications ==
The House of Lords committee that discussed the statute concluded that it meant to formalise what had previously been custom in regards to the rights of peers and the monarch, and that any previous statute made without regard for this was void. Henry Hallam concluded that, although seeming to advance the rights of the people by confirming previous custom (which included requiring the monarch to consult the House of Commons when passing a statute), the enactment "seems rather to limit than to enhance the supreme power of parliament, if it were meant to prohibit any future enactment of the kind by its sole authority", since the Lords Ordainers had been elected by the people; nonetheless, most historians believe it extended the Commons' rights. Those historians who do agree that it recognised the right of the Commons do not agree what it recognised; some say that it required the consent of the Commons when significant constitutional changes were to be made, some that it merely recognised the right of the Commons to be consulted in financial matters, and some that it recognised the right of the Commons to be consulted on all matters of general interest; the third theory is the most commonly accepted one. As stated, "the matters to be established for the estate of the king and of his heirs, and for the estate of the realm and of the people, should be treated, accorded, and established in parliament, by the king, and by the assent of the prelates, earls, and barons, and the commonalty of the realm, according as had been before accustomed"

== Further remedies ==
While the Ordinances themselves had been repealed, many of the administrative points they had contained – regarding in particular sheriffs, the Statute of Merchants, and two grievances over legal appeals (Ordinances 17, 33, 35 and 36) – were taken over almost word for word in the new legislation, being known collectively as the six "Good Clauses".

Over time these clauses would later be repealed, eventually leaving just the introductory prohibition on such ordinances being made except by the king, Lords and Commons in Parliament.

== Bibliography ==
- Haskins, George Lee (1937). "A Draft of the Statute of York". The English Historical Review. 52 (205). Oxford University Press. doi:10.1093/ehr/lii.ccv.74. ISSN 0013-8266.
- Lapsey, Gaillard (1913). "The Commons and the Statute of York". The English Historical Review. 28 (109). Oxford University Press. ISSN 0013-8266.
- Lapsey, Gaillard (January 1941). "The Interpretation of the Statute of York. Part I". The English Historical Review. 36 (221). Oxford University Press. ISSN 0013-8266.
- Strayer, Joseph R. (1941). "The Statute of York and the Community of the Realm". American Historical Review. 47 (1). American Historical Association. ISSN 0002-8762.
- Wilkinson, B. (1944). "The Coronation Oath of Edward II and the Statute of York". Speculum. 19 (4). Medieval Academy of America. doi:10.2307/2853482. ISSN 0038-7134.
