= Simon Mepeham =

Archbishop of Canterbury from 1328 to 1333

- Archbishop of Canterbury
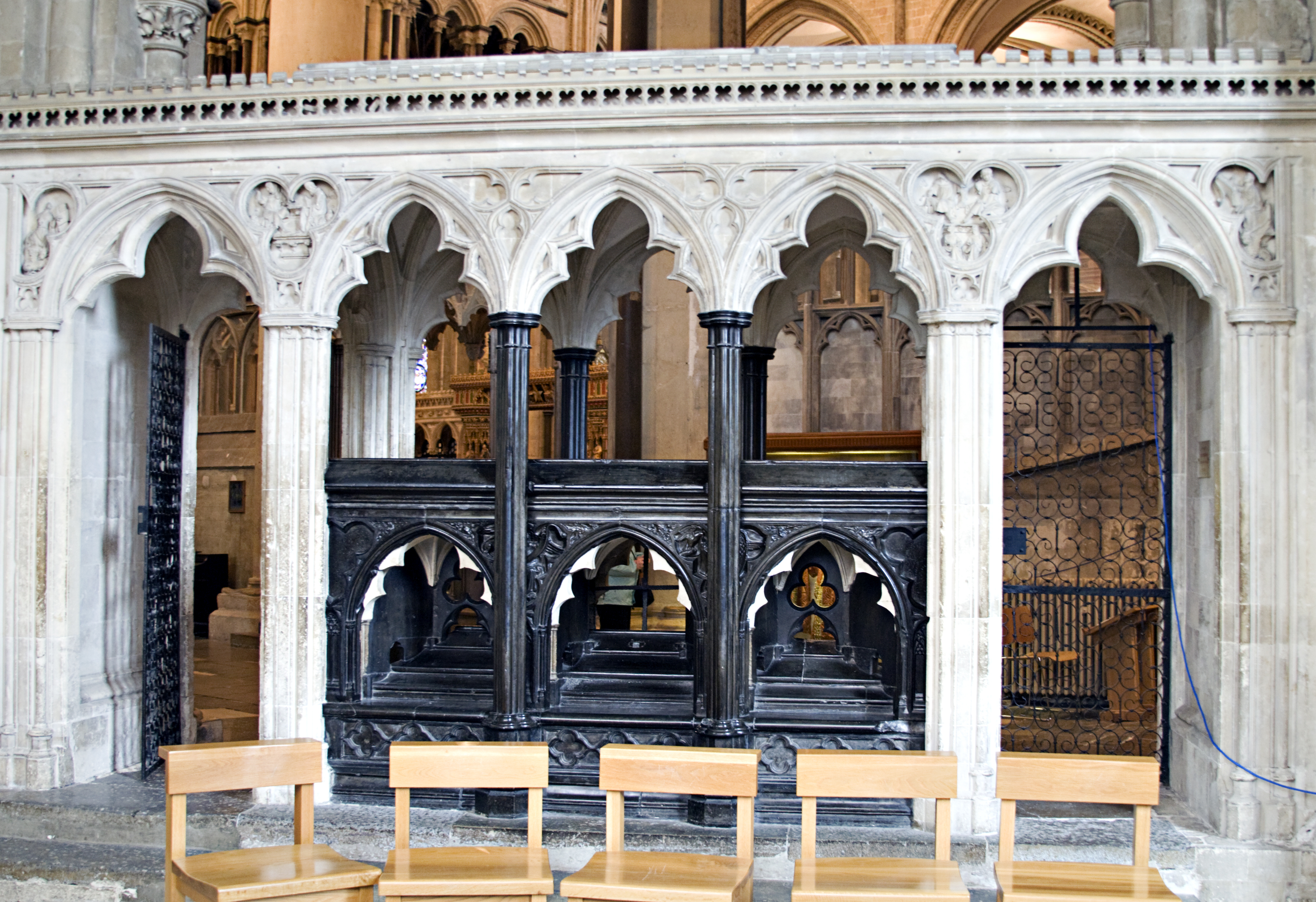
- Tomb of Mepeham in Canterbury Cathedral
- Church: Catholic Church
- Elected: 11 December 1327
- Installed: 22 January 1329
- Term ended: 12 October 1333
- Predecessor: Walter Reynolds
- Successor: John de Stratford

Orders
- Ordination: 21 September 1297
- Consecration: 5 June 1328

Personal details
- Died: 12 October 1333

Simon Mepeham (or Meopham or Mepham; died 1333) was Archbishop of Canterbury from 1328 to 1333.

== Early life ==
Mepeham was educated at Oxford between the years 1290 and 1296 at Merton College where he devoted himself to the study of theology. He was ordained priest on 21 September 1297 in Canterbury Cathedral by Archbishop Robert Winchelsey, who gave Simon the rectory of Tunstall in Kent.

Mepeham became a prebendary of Llandaff in 1295 and soon afterwards a canon of Chichester but took no interest or part in public affairs.

== Archbishop of Canterbury ==
Mepeham was the candidate of the Earl of Lancaster against the candidate supported by Queen Isabella and Roger Mortimer. Elected to the Archbishopric of Canterbury on 11 December 1327, Simon Mepeham was consecrated on 5 June 1328, and received the temporalities of the see of Canterbury on 19 September 1328. That winter, he supported a rebellion against the rule of Roger Mortimer that was led by the Earl of Lancaster and supported by the Earl of Norfolk, Earl of Kent and others.

Archbishop Mepeham's register is lost and as a result what we know of his governance of his see is gleaned from the chroniclers William Thorne and William Dene. Mepeham was considered to be a "man of no great ability and with scanty knowledge of ecclesiastical tradition and propriety, and the maintenance of the rights of his See caused disputes on every side."

== Dispute and excommunication ==
Mepeham became involved in a dispute about the juridical rights of churches that had been appropriated by St Augustine's Abbey. The monks made an appeal against the Archbishop, and a Papal nuncio and canon of Salisbury, Icherius de Concareto, was appointed to mediate. Mepeham was cited to give evidence before him, but refused to attend. The suffragans of Canterbury were in support of Mepeham, but his refusal to submit to the judicial process of the Church led to his excommunication by Pope John XXII in 1333. Concoreto had issued an order suspending Mepham from presiding at Divine Services on 22 January 1333 with the condition that should the Archbishop continue to refuse to resist the will of the Pope and court he was to be excommunicated 30 days later.

Mepeham's excommunication was posthumously rescinded, allowing him to be buried in Canterbury Cathedral.

== Death and afterward ==
Mepeham died on 12 October 1333. He is buried in a tomb made of black marble located beneath the entrance arch to the Chapel of St. Anselm in Canterbury Cathedral.

== Citations ==
Catholic Church titles
Preceded by Walter Reynolds	Archbishop of Canterbury; 1328–1333	Succeeded by John de Stratford
