= Strange laws =

Laws seen as useless, humorous or obsolete

Strange laws, also called weird laws, dumb laws, futile laws, unusual laws, unnecessary laws, legal oddities, or legal curiosities, are laws that are said to be useless, humorous or obsolete, or are no longer applicable (in regard to current culture or modern law). A number of books and websites list dumb laws. These are in many cases based on misunderstandings or exaggerations, or are entirely fictional.

== Veracity ==
Laws presented as "dumb laws", "strange laws", or "weird laws", are said to be useless, no longer applicable (in regard to current culture or modern law), or humorous. A large number of hoax or exaggerated dumb laws are circulated on the internet and in the print media.

Several books have been written and numerous listicles exist on the internet listing "dumb laws" in various jurisdictions. The "dumb laws" are also often circulated via e-mail chain letters.

== Examples ==
Some purported strange laws do not exist, no longer exist, or were never passed, while others are actually in effect, although they are often exaggerated or misrepresented. Sometimes similar laws, such as a prohibition of dying (typically in certain buildings and local areas), really exist in some places, but are mere urban legends in other places. Some compilers confuse the circumstances in which a defendant was convicted under a more general statute, such as a noise ordinance or disorderly conduct, as the text of the law itself. Others may fabricate a purported law as a copyright trap.

=== European Union ===
A lot of purportedly strange laws within European Union law do not actually exist, or are wildly exaggerated; these are referred to as Euromyths.

Misrepresented

- Commission Regulation (EC) No. 2257/94, sometimes called the 'bendy banana law': the alleged ban on curved bananas is a long-standing, famous, and stereotypical claim that is used in headlines to typify the Euromyth. Amongst other issues of acceptable quality and standards, the regulation does actually specify minimum dimensions of bananas and requires that they be free from deformation or abnormal curvature. However, the provisions relating to shape apply fully only to bananas sold as Extra class; slight defects of shape (but not size) are permitted in Class I and Class II bananas. A proposal banning straight bananas and other misshapen fruits was brought before the European Parliament in 2008 and defeated.

=== United Kingdom ===
In March 2013, the Law Commission (England and Wales), which is tasked with abolishing obsolete and unnecessary laws to reform the legal system, published an informal document answering some frequently asked questions about the veracity of some alleged "legal oddities" or "legal curiosities".

False

- The Law Commission wrote that there is no law making it "legal to shoot a Welshman with a longbow on Sunday in the Cathedral Close in Hereford; or inside the city walls of Chester after midnight; or a Scotsman within the city walls of York, other than on a Sunday." These three related urban legends frequently show up in lists of strange laws, but there is no historical basis for them other than an alleged 1403 ordinance of the city of Chester, which supposedly imposed a curfew on Welshmen in the city in response to the Glyndŵr Rising. The Law Commission stated: "It is illegal to shoot a Welsh or Scottish (or any other) person regardless of the day, location or choice of weaponry". In 2016, BBC News claimed these three laws were "of course" and "obviously" not applicable in modern times (neither confirming nor denying whether such laws actually exist or have ever existed), although a 2006 BBC News article mentioned the two alleged anti-Welsh laws amongst a number of "strange-but-true laws" without giving any hint as to their modern non-applicability.

True

- On the other hand, the Commission confirmed it is illegal to wear a suit of armour in the Houses of Parliament according to the 1313 Statute forbidding Bearing of Armour.
- Alfred the Great's law code really did contain the law, "If a man unintentionally kills another man by letting a tree fall on him, the tree shall be given to the kinsmen of the slain".
- Salmon Act 1986, Section 32: "Handling Salmon in Suspicious Circumstances" sounds funny, but it simply forbids receiving or disposing of salmon which has been illegally fished.

=== United States ===
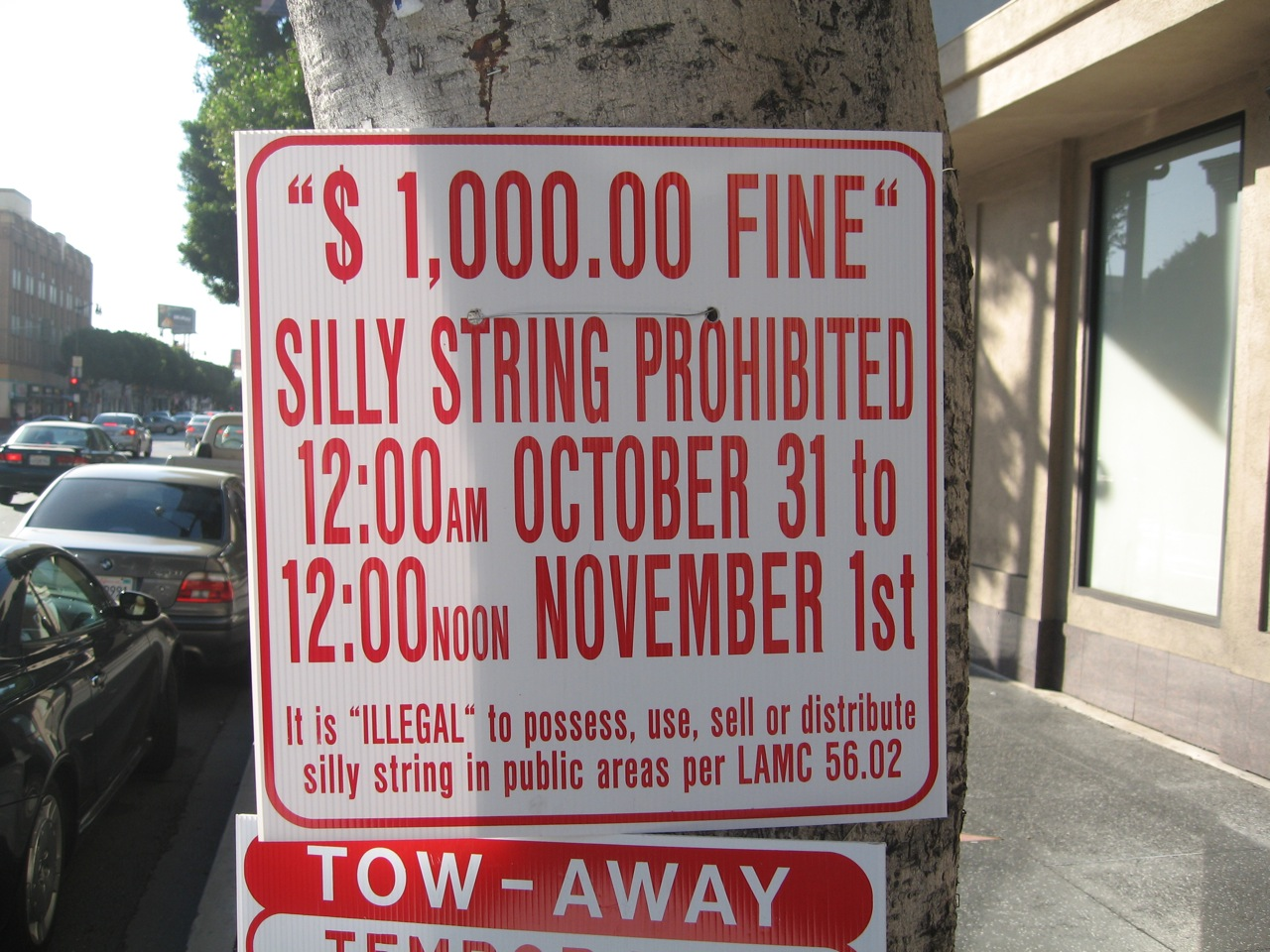
After aerosol string cost $200,000/year to clean up, Los Angeles passed an ordinance banning Silly String in Hollywood during Halloween.

Misrepresented

- Supposedly, there is a law stating that one cannot fish while riding on the back of a camel in Idaho. A 1917 legal provision in the "Fish and Game rules" did ban riding on any animal while fishing, whatever that animal might be; this restriction was later removed, so it is no longer true.

False

- Supposedly, a law in Iowa limits the length of a kiss to five minutes. The law does not appear in the Iowa Legislature, but circulates online.
- That "sorority houses are illegal since more than a certain number of single females living together constitutes a brothel" has been debunked as fake.
- A myth that it is illegal to hunt camels in Arizona is loosely inspired by the true story of the United States Camel Corps, which tested the use of camels in the Southwest United States.
- Various legends claim that Massachusetts or Maine laws or prison regulations forbade serving lobster more than twice per week to prisoners, but there is no evidence of that.

Never passed

- Indiana Pi Bill – in 1897 the Indiana General Assembly considered endorsing an incorrect mathematical claim. The bill failed in the Senate.

True

- In Wisconsin, lutefisk is specifically exempted from being considered a "toxic substance" under an employees' right to know law.
- Silly String ban on Halloween in Los Angeles. The ban was put in place in 2004 due to cleanup costs exceeding US$200,000.
- In Gainesville, Georgia, it is illegal to eat chicken tenders with a fork. This was started as a publicity stunt, and nobody has been arrested for breaking it.

=== Other countries ===
False

Supposedly, it is illegal to be fat in Japan. That is untrue, but citizens between 45 and 74 must have their waists measured and might be given medical guidance if their waist exceeds a certain measure.

True

- In Jamaica, Saudi Arabia and Barbados it is illegal to dress in camouflage clothing.
- In Singapore, the sale of chewing gum is illegal.

In the Philippines, the Revised Penal Code provision against "unjust vexation" is cited as weird. Unjust vexation is a positive act of annoying others.[41] It has been criticized as a "vague" or as a "catch-all-crime".[42]
