= List of acts of the Parliament of England, 1308–1325 =

This is a list of acts of the Parliament of England for the years for the years 1308 until 1325.

For acts passed during the period 1707–1800, see the list of acts of the Parliament of Great Britain. See also the list of acts of the Parliament of Scotland and the list of acts of the Parliament of Ireland.

For acts passed from 1801 onwards, see the list of acts of the Parliament of the United Kingdom. For acts of the devolved parliaments and assemblies in the United Kingdom, see the list of acts of the Scottish Parliament, the list of acts of the Northern Ireland Assembly, and the list of acts and measures of Senedd Cymru; see also the list of acts of the Parliament of Northern Ireland.

For medieval statutes, etc. that are not considered to be acts of Parliament, see the list of English statutes.

The number shown after each act's title is its chapter number. Acts are cited using this number, preceded by the year(s) of the reign during which the relevant parliamentary session was held; thus the Union with Ireland Act 1800 is cited as "39 & 40 Geo. 3. c. 67", meaning the 67th act passed during the session that started in the 39th year of the reign of George III and which finished in the 40th year of that reign. Note that the modern convention is to use Arabic numerals in citations (thus "41 Geo. 3" rather than "41 Geo. III"). Acts of the last session of the Parliament of Great Britain and the first session of the Parliament of the United Kingdom are both cited as "41 Geo. 3".

Acts passed by the Parliament of England did not have a short title; however, some of these acts have subsequently been given a short title by acts of the Parliament of the United Kingdom (such as the Short Titles Act 1896).

Acts passed by the Parliament of England were deemed to have come into effect on the first day of the session in which they were passed. Because of this, the years given in the list below may in fact be the year before a particular act was passed.

== 1308 (2 Edw. 2) ==
This session was also traditionally cited as 2 Ed. 2 or 2 E. 2.

- De Prisis injust' non capiend' a Viris Ecclesiastic' seu aliis — not printed in The Statutes at Large; repealed for England and Wales by Statute Law Revision Act 1863 (26 & 27 Vict. c. 125) and for Ireland by Statute Law (Ireland) Revision Act 1872 (35 & 36 Vict. c. 98)

=== Sources ===
- "2° Edw. II". The Statutes of the Realm. Vol. 1. pp. 153–154 – via HathiTrust.
- Chronological Table of and Index to the Statutes. Vol. 1: To the End of the Session 59 Vict. Sess. 2 (1895) (13th ed.). London: Her Majesty's Stationery Office. 1896. p. 18 – via Google Books.
- Chronological Table of the Statutes: Covering the Period from 1235 to the End of 1971. London: Her Majesty's Stationery Office. 1972. p. 15. ISBN 978-0-11-840096-1 – via Google Books.

== 1309 (3 Edw. 2) ==
A Parliament of King Edward I which met at Stamford from 27 July 1309.

This session was also traditionally cited as 3 Ed. 2 or 3 E. 2.

For De Statuto pro Clero inviolabiliter observando see 10 Edw. 2.

Statutum apud Staunford (Statute of Stamford) — cited as 2 Edw. 2 in The Statutes at Large, repealed for England and Wales by Statute Law Revision Act 1863 (26 & 27 Vict. c. 125) and for Ireland by Statute Law (Ireland) Revision Act 1872 (35 & 36 Vict. c. 98)

=== Sources ===
- "3° Edw. II". The Statutes of the Realm. Vol. 1. pp. 154–156 – via HathiTrust.
- "Anno secundo Edwardi II". The Statutes at Large. Vol. 1 – Magna Charta to 14 Edward III – 1225 to 1340. 16 April 1762. pp. 334–335 – via Internet Archive.
- "Anno secundo Edwardi II". The Statutes at Large. Vol. 1 – Magna Charta to 14 Edward III – 1225 to 1340. Cambridge, Printed by J. Bentham. 16 April 1762. pp. 334–335 – via Internet Archive.
- Chronological Table of and Index to the Statutes. Vol. 1: To the End of the Session 59 Vict. Sess. 2 (1895) (13th ed.). London: Her Majesty's Stationery Office. 1896. p. 18 – via Google Books.
- Chronological Table of the Statutes: Covering the Period from 1235 to the End of 1971. London: Her Majesty's Stationery Office. 1972. p. 15. ISBN 978-0-11-840096-1 – via Google Books.

== 1311 (5 Edw. 2) ==
This session was also traditionally cited as 5 Ed. 2 or 5 E. 2.

- Les noveles Ordenances (The New Ordinances) Franchises of the Church, etc. — not printed in The Statutes at Large; repealed by 15 Edw. 2. Revoc. nov. Ord.

=== Sources ===
- "5° Edw. II". The Statutes of the Realm. Vol. 1. pp. 157–168 – via HathiTrust.
- Chronological Table of and Index to the Statutes. Vol. 1: To the End of the Session 59 Vict. Sess. 2 (1895) (13th ed.). London: Her Majesty's Stationery Office. 1896. p. 18 – via Google Books.
- Chronological Table of the Statutes: Covering the Period from 1235 to the End of 1971. London: Her Majesty's Stationery Office. 1972. p. 15. ISBN 978-0-11-840096-1 – via Google Books.

== 1313 (7 Edw. 2) ==
A parliament of King Edward II which met at York from 9 September 1314.

This session was also traditionally cited as 7 Ed. 2 or 7 E. 2.

- Quod nullus molestetur (Indemnity as to death of Piers de Gaveston) — repealed by Statute Law Revision Act 1948 (11 & 12 Geo. 6. c. 62)
- Ne quis occasionetur (Indemnity as to return of Piers de Gaveston) — repealed by Statute Law Revision Act 1948 (11 & 12 Geo. 6. c. 62)
- Coming Armed to Parliament Act 1313 Statuto sup' Arportam'to Armor (A Statute forbidding Bearing of Armour) — cited as 7 Edw. 1. Stat. 1 in The Statutes at Large;
  still in force

=== Sources ===
- "7° Edw. II". The Statutes of the Realm. Vol. 1. pp. 169–170 – via HathiTrust.
- "Anno septimo Edwardi II". The Statutes at Large. Vol. 1 – Magna Charta to 14 Edward III – 1225 to 1340. 16 April 1762. pp. 337–338 – via Internet Archive.
- "Anno septimo Edwardi II". The Statutes at Large. Vol. 1 – Magna Charta to 14 Edward III – 1225 to 1340. Cambridge, Printed by J. Bentham. 16 April 1762. pp. 337–338 – via Internet Archive.
- "Anno septimo Edwardi I". The Statutes at Large. Vol. 1 – Magna Charta to 14 Edward III – 1225 to 1340. 16 April 1762. pp. 132–133 – via Internet Archive.
- "Anno septimo Edwardi I". The Statutes at Large. Vol. 1 – Magna Charta to 14 Edward III – 1225 to 1340. Cambridge, Printed by J. Bentham. 16 April 1762. pp. 132–133 – via Internet Archive.
- Chronological Table of and Index to the Statutes. Vol. 1: To the End of the Session 59 Vict. Sess. 2 (1895) (13th ed.). London: Her Majesty's Stationery Office. 1896. pp. 18–19 – via Google Books.
- Chronological Table of the Statutes: Covering the Period from 1235 to the End of 1971. London: Her Majesty's Stationery Office. 1972. p. 15. ISBN 978-0-11-840096-1 – via Google Books.
- "Acts of the English Parliament from 1313". legislation.gov.uk. The National Archives.

== 1315 (9 Edw. 2) ==
This session was also traditionally cited as 9 Ed. 2 or 9 E. 2.

Articuli Cleri (Articles for the Clergy) 9 Edw. 2. Stat. 1 – cited as 9 Edw. 2. Stat 2 in The Statutes at Large

- (Prohibition) c. 1 No Prohibition shall be granted where Tithes are demanded, but where Money for them. — repealed for Northern Ireland by Statute Law Revision Act 1950 (14 Geo. 6. c. 6) and for England and Wales by Ecclesiastical Jurisdiction Measure 1963 (No. 1)
- (Prohibition) c. 2 Debate upon the Right of Tithes exceeding the Fourth Part. Enjoyning Penance Corporal or Pecuniary. — repealed for Northern Ireland by Statute Law Revision Act 1950 (14 Geo. 6. c. 6) and for England and Wales by Ecclesiastical Jurisdiction Measure 1963 (No. 1)
- (Prohibition) c. 3 Laying violent Hands upon a Clerk. Excommunication for Penance Corporal. — repealed for England and Wales by Offences Against the Person Act 1828 (9 Geo. 4. c. 31), for Ireland by Offences Against the Person (Ireland) Act 1829 (10 Geo. 4. c. 34) and for India by Criminal Law (India) Act 1828 (9 Geo. 4. c. 74)
- (Prohibition) c. 4 Prelates may correct for Defamation. — repealed for England and Wales by Statute Law Revision Act 1863 (26 & 27 Vict. c. 125) and for Ireland by Statute Law (Ireland) Revision Act 1872 (35 & 36 Vict. c. 98)
- (Prohibition) c. 5 Prohibition shall not lie upon Demand of Tythe for a new Mill. — repealed by Statute Law Revision Act 1948 (11 & 12 Geo. 6. c. 62)
- (Ecclesiastical court) c. 6 Where a Suit for one Offence may be prosecuted both in Court Spiritual and Temporal. — repealed for Northern Ireland by Statute Law Revision Act 1950 (14 Geo. 6. c. 6) and for England and Wales by Ecclesiastical Jurisdiction Measure 1963 (No. 1)
- (Excommunication) c. 7 In what only Case the King's Letters shall be sent to discharge an Excommunicate. — repealed for Northern Ireland by Statute Law Revision Act 1950 (14 Geo. 6. c. 6) and for England and Wales by Ecclesiastical Jurisdiction Measure 1963 (No. 1)
- (Residence on benefice) c. 8 Clerks in the King's Service shall be discharged of their Residence, but shall be corrected by the Ordinary. — repealed for Northern Ireland by Statute Law Revision Act 1950 (14 Geo. 6. c. 6) and for England and Wales by Statute Law (Repeals) Act 1969 (c. 52)
- (Distress on the clergy) c. 9 Distress shall not be taken on the Highways, nor in the ancient Fees of the Church. — repealed for Northern Ireland by Statute Law Revision Act 1950 (14 Geo. 6. c. 6) and for England and Wales by Statute Law (Repeals) Act 1969 (c. 52)
- (Privilege of sanctuary) c. 10 They that abjure the Realm shall be in Peace, so long as they be in the Church or Highway. — repealed for England and Wales by Statute Law Revision Act 1863 (26 & 27 Vict. c. 125) and for Ireland by Statute Law (Ireland) Revision Act 1872 (35 & 36 Vict. c. 98)
- (Corodies, etc.) c. 11 Religious Houses shall not be charged by Compulsion with Corodies, Pensions, Resort, or taking of their Horses or Carts. — repealed for England and Wales by Statute Law Revision Act 1863 (26 & 27 Vict. c. 125) and for Ireland by Statute Law (Ireland) Revision Act 1872 (35 & 36 Vict. c. 98)
- (Excommunication) c. 12 A Clerk excommunicate may be taken out of the Parish where he dwelleth. — repealed for England and Wales by Statute Law Revision Act 1863 (26 & 27 Vict. c. 125) and for Ireland by Statute Law (Ireland) Revision Act 1872 (35 & 36 Vict. c. 98)
- (Clergy) c. 13 The Examination of a Pardon presented to a Benefice belongeth to a Spiritual Judge. — repealed for Northern Ireland by Statute Law Revision Act 1950 (14 Geo. 6. c. 6) and for England and Wales by Statute Law (Repeals) Act 1969 (c. 52)
- (Church) c. 14 There shall be free Election of Dignities of the Church. — repealed for Northern Ireland by Statute Law Revision Act 1950 (14 Geo. 6. c. 6) and for England and Wales by Statute Law (Repeals) Act 1969 (c. 52)
- (Privilege of sanctuary) c. 15 A Clerk fleeing into the Church for Felony, shall not be compelled to abjure. — repealed for England and Wales by Statute Law Revision Act 1863 (26 & 27 Vict. c. 125) and for Ireland by Statute Law (Ireland) Revision Act 1872 (35 & 36 Vict. c. 98)
- (Privilege of clergy) c. 16 (Note: This chapter in The Statutes at Large includes the last part of this statute.) The Privilege of the Church being demanded by the Ordinary, shall not be denied to a Clerk that hath confessed Felony. — repealed for England and Wales by Statute Law Revision Act 1863 (26 & 27 Vict. c. 125) and for Ireland by Statute Law (Ireland) Revision Act 1872 (35 & 36 Vict. c. 98)

Statutum Lincoln' de Vicecomitibȝ (Statute of Lincoln) or the Statute of Sheriffs (9 Edw. 2. Stat. 2) — repealed by Sheriffs Act 1887 (50 & 51 Vict. c. 55)

=== Sources ===
- "9° Edw. II". The Statutes of the Realm. Vol. 1. pp. 171–175 – via HathiTrust.
- "Anno septimo Edwardi II". The Statutes at Large. Vol. 1 – Magna Charta to 14 Edward III – 1225 to 1340. 16 April 1762. pp. 337–349 – via Internet Archive.
- "Anno septimo Edwardi II". The Statutes at Large. Vol. 1 – Magna Charta to 14 Edward III – 1225 to 1340. Cambridge, Printed by J. Bentham. 16 April 1762. pp. 337–349 – via Internet Archive.
- Chronological Table of and Index to the Statutes. Vol. 1: To the End of the Session 59 Vict. Sess. 2 (1895) (13th ed.). London: Her Majesty's Stationery Office. 1896. p. 19 – via Google Books.
- Chronological Table of the Statutes: Covering the Period from 1235 to the End of 1971. London: Her Majesty's Stationery Office. 1972. pp. 15–16. ISBN 978-0-11-840096-1 – via Google Books.

== 1316 (10 Edw. 2) ==
This session was also traditionally cited as 10 Ed. 2 or 10 E. 2.

For Statutum de Gaveleto in London (The Statute of Gavelet, made in London), cited as 10 Edw. 2 in The Statutes at Large, see Statutes of uncertain date.

- Purveyance on the Clergy Act 1316 De Statuto pro Clero inviolabiliter observando (Of inviolably observing the Statute for the Clergy) — cited as 3 Edw. 2 in The Statutes at Large; repealed for England and Wales by Statute Law Revision Act 1863 (26 & 27 Vict. c. 125) and for Ireland by Statute Law (Ireland) Revision Act 1872 (35 & 36 Vict. c. 98)

=== Sources ===
- "10° Edw. II". The Statutes of the Realm. Vol. 1. pp. 175–176 – via HathiTrust.
- "Anno tertio Edwardi II". The Statutes at Large. Vol. 1 – Magna Charta to 14 Edward III – 1225 to 1340. 16 April 1762. pp. 335–337 – via Internet Archive.
- "Anno tertio Edwardi II". The Statutes at Large. Vol. 1 – Magna Charta to 14 Edward III – 1225 to 1340. Cambridge, Printed by J. Bentham. 16 April 1762. pp. 335–337 – via Internet Archive.
- Chronological Table of and Index to the Statutes. Vol. 1: To the End of the Session 59 Vict. Sess. 2 (1895) (13th ed.). London: Her Majesty's Stationery Office. 1896. p. 19 – via Google Books.
- Chronological Table of the Statutes: Covering the Period from 1235 to the End of 1971. London: Her Majesty's Stationery Office. 1972. p. 16. ISBN 978-0-11-840096-1 – via Google Books.

== 1318 (12 Edw. 2) ==
A parliament held in York from 20 October 1318.

This session was also traditionally cited as 12 Ed. 2 or 12 E. 2.

For The Statute of Essoins, cited as 12 Edw. 2. Stat. 2 in The Statutes at Large, see Modus calumpniandi Esson' under Statutes of uncertain date.

- Statutum Eborac' (Statute of York) — cited as 12 Edw. 2. Stat. 1 in The Statutes at Large
  - c. 1 Tenants in Assise of Novel disseisin may make Attornies. — repealed for England and Wales by Statute Law Revision Act 1863 (26 & 27 Vict. c. 125) and for Ireland by Statute Law (Ireland) Revision Act 1872 (35 & 36 Vict. c. 98)
  - c. 2 Process against the Witnesses to prove a deed denied. — repealed for England and Wales by Statute Law Revision Act 1863 (26 & 27 Vict. c. 125) and for Ireland by Statute Law (Ireland) Revision Act 1872 (35 & 36 Vict. c. 98)
  - c. 3 Inquests and Juries touching Plea of Land shall be taken by Nisi Prius. — repealed for England and Wales by Statute Law Revision and Civil Procedure Act 1881 (44 & 45 Vict. c. 59) and for Northern Ireland by Statute Law Revision Act 1950 (14 Geo. 6. c. 6)
  - c. 4 Justices of Nisi Prius shall record Nonsuits, Defaults, &c. — repealed for England and Wales by Statute Law Revision and Civil Procedure Act 1881 (44 & 45 Vict. c. 59) and for Northern Ireland by Statute Law Revision Act 1950 (14 Geo. 6. c. 6)
  - c. 5 An Indenture shall be made between the Sheriff and Bailiff of Liberty of every Return. — repealed for England and Wales by Statute Law Revision and Civil Procedure Act 1881 (44 & 45 Vict. c. 59) and for Northern Ireland by ??
  - c. 6 No Officer of a City or Borough shall sell Wine or Victuals during his Office. — repealed by Forestalling, Regrating, etc. Act 1844 (7 & 8 Vict. c. 24)

=== Sources ===
- "12° Edw. II". The Statutes of the Realm. Vol. 1. pp. 177–179 – via HathiTrust.
- "Anno ducdecimo Edwardi II". The Statutes at Large. Vol. 1 – Magna Charta to 14 Edward III – 1225 to 1340. 16 April 1762. pp. 351–357 – via Internet Archive.
- "Anno ducdecimo Edwardi II". The Statutes at Large. Vol. 1 – Magna Charta to 14 Edward III – 1225 to 1340. Cambridge, Printed by J. Bentham. 16 April 1762. pp. 351–357 – via Internet Archive.
- Chronological Table of and Index to the Statutes. Vol. 1: To the End of the Session 59 Vict. Sess. 2 (1895) (13th ed.). London: Her Majesty's Stationery Office. 1896. p. 19 – via Google Books.
- Chronological Table of the Statutes: Covering the Period from 1235 to the End of 1971. London: Her Majesty's Stationery Office. 1972. p. 16. ISBN 978-0-11-840096-1 – via Google Books.

== 1321 (14 Edw. 2) ==
This session was also traditionally cited as 14 Ed. 2 or 14 E. 2.

- Statutum Westm' iiii (Statute of Westminster the Fourth) (Sheriffs; juries) — cited as Statutum de vicecomitibus et aliis de viridi cera in The Statutes at Large repealed for England and Wales by Statute Law Revision Act 1863 (26 & 27 Vict. c. 125) and for Ireland by Statute Law (Ireland) Revision Act 1872 (35 & 36 Vict. c. 98)

=== Sources ===
- "14° Edw. II". The Statutes of the Realm. Vol. 1. pp. 180–181 – via HathiTrust.
- "Anno decimo quarto Edwardi II". The Statutes at Large. Vol. 1 – Magna Charta to 14 Edward III – 1225 to 1340. 16 April 1762. pp. 359–360 – via Internet Archive.
- Chronological Table of and Index to the Statutes. Vol. 1: To the End of the Session 59 Vict. Sess. 2 (1895) (13th ed.). London: Her Majesty's Stationery Office. 1896. p. 19 – via Google Books.
- Chronological Table of the Statutes: Covering the Period from 1235 to the End of 1971. London: Her Majesty's Stationery Office. 1972. p. 16. ISBN 978-0-11-840096-1 – via Google Books.

== 1322 (15 Edw. 2) ==
This session was also traditionally cited as 15 Ed. 2 or 15 E. 2.

For Statutum de Carleol. de Finibus, cited as 15 Edw. 2 in The Statutes at Large, see Statutum de Finibus et Attornatis under Statutes of uncertain date.

- Exilium Hugonis le Despenser Patris et Filii (The Exile of Huge le Despenser Father and Son) Award of exile against Hugh le Despenser, father and son — repealed by Statute Law Revision Act 1948 (11 & 12 Geo. 6. c. 62)
- A Statute Revoking the Pardon granted to the Pursuers of the Despensers — repealed by Statute Law Revision Act 1948 (11 & 12 Geo. 6. c. 62)

=== Sources ===
- "15° Edw. II". The Statutes of the Realm. Vol. 1. pp. 181–188 – via HathiTrust.
- "Anno decimo quinto Edwardi II". The Statutes at Large. Vol. 1 – Magna Charta to 14 Edward III – 1225 to 1340. 16 April 1762. pp. 362–372 – via Internet Archive.
- "Anno decimo quinto Edwardi II". The Statutes at Large. Vol. 1 – Magna Charta to 14 Edward III – 1225 to 1340. Cambridge, Printed by J. Bentham. 16 April 1762. pp. 362–372 – via Internet Archive.
- Chronological Table of and Index to the Statutes. Vol. 1: To the End of the Session 59 Vict. Sess. 2 (1895) (13th ed.). London: Her Majesty's Stationery Office. 1896. p. 19 – via Google Books.
- Chronological Table of the Statutes: Covering the Period from 1235 to the End of 1971. London: Her Majesty's Stationery Office. 1972. p. 16. ISBN 978-0-11-840096-1 – via Google Books.
- "Acts of the English Parliament from 1322". legislation.gov.uk. The National Archives.

== 1323 ==
=== 15 Edw. 2 ===
This session was also traditionally cited as 15 Ed. 2 or 15 E. 2.

- Revocatio novarum Ordinationum (Revocation of the New Ordinances) or the Statute of York (Statutum Eborac') — cited as 'A Statute revoking an Establishment of the Houshold' (16 Edw. 2) in The Statutes at Large;
  still in force

=== Sources ===
- "15° Edw. II". The Statutes of the Realm. Vol. 1. pp. 189–190 – via HathiTrust.
- "Anno decimo sexto Edwardi II". The Statutes at Large. Vol. 1 – Magna Charta to 14 Edward III – 1225 to 1340. 16 April 1762. pp. 372–373 – via Internet Archive.
- "Anno decimo sexto Edwardi II". The Statutes at Large. Vol. 1 – Magna Charta to 14 Edward III – 1225 to 1340. Cambridge, Printed by J. Bentham. 16 April 1762. pp. 372–373 – via Internet Archive.
- Chronological Table of and Index to the Statutes. Vol. 1: To the End of the Session 59 Vict. Sess. 2 (1895) (13th ed.). London: Her Majesty's Stationery Office. 1896. p. 19 – via Google Books.
- Chronological Table of the Statutes: Covering the Period from 1235 to the End of 1971. London: Her Majesty's Stationery Office. 1972. p. 16. ISBN 978-0-11-840096-1 – via Google Books.
- "Acts of the English Parliament from 1322". legislation.gov.uk. The National Archives.

=== 16 Edw. 2 ===
This session was also traditionally cited as 16 Ed. 2 or 16 E. 2.

- Statutum de forma mittendi Extractas ad Scaccarium (A Statute for Estreats of the Exchequer) — repealed for England and Wales by Statute Law Revision Act 1863 (26 & 27 Vict. c. 125) and for Ireland by Statute Law (Ireland) Revision Act 1872 (35 & 36 Vict. c. 98)

==== Sources ====
- "16° Edw. II". The Statutes of the Realm. Vol. 1. pp. 190–192 – via HathiTrust.
- Chronological Table of and Index to the Statutes. Vol. 1: To the End of the Session 59 Vict. Sess. 2 (1895) (13th ed.). London: Her Majesty's Stationery Office. 1896. p. 19 – via Google Books.
- Chronological Table of the Statutes: Covering the Period from 1235 to the End of 1971. London: Her Majesty's Stationery Office. 1972. p. 16. ISBN 978-0-11-840096-1 – via Google Books.

=== 17 Edw. 2 ===
This session was also traditionally cited as 17 Ed. 2 or 17 E. 2.

- Ordinacio de Statu Terre Hib'n' f'ca (Ordinance made for the State of the Land of Ireland) (pro Hib.) 17 Edw. 2 Stat. 1 — cited as 17 Edw. 1 in The Statutes at Large
  - (The King's officers in Ireland shall purchase no land there without the King's licence) c. 1 — repealed for England and Wales by Statute Law Revision Act 1863 (26 & 27 Vict. c. 125) and for Ireland by Statute Law (Ireland) Revision Act 1872 (35 & 36 Vict. c. 98)
  - (In what case only purveyance may be made in Ireland) c. 2 — repealed for England and Wales by Statute Law Revision Act 1863 (26 & 27 Vict. c. 125) and for Ireland by Statute Law (Ireland) Revision Act 1872 (35 & 36 Vict. c. 98)
  - (Exporting of merchandise out of Ireland) c. 3 — repealed for England and Wales by Statute Law Revision Act 1863 (26 & 27 Vict. c. 125) and for Ireland by Statute Law (Ireland) Revision Act 1872 (35 & 36 Vict. c. 98)
  - (Fees of a bill of grace) c. 4 — repealed for England and Wales by Statute Law Revision Act 1863 (26 & 27 Vict. c. 125) and for Ireland by Statute Law (Ireland) Revision Act 1872 (35 & 36 Vict. c. 98)
  - (Fee of the Marshal) c. 5 — repealed for England and Wales by Statute Law Revision Act 1863 (26 & 27 Vict. c. 125) and for Ireland by Statute Law (Ireland) Revision Act 1872 (35 & 36 Vict. c. 98)
  - (Pardons and protections) c. 6 — repealed for England and Wales by Statute Law Revision Act 1863 (26 & 27 Vict. c. 125) and for Ireland by Statute Law (Ireland) Revision Act 1872 (35 & 36 Vict. c. 98)
  - (The sealing of writs) c. 7 — repealed for England and Wales by Statute Law Revision Act 1863 (26 & 27 Vict. c. 125) and for Ireland by Statute Law (Ireland) Revision Act 1872 (35 & 36 Vict. c. 98)
  - (Adjournments of assizes of novel disseisin) c. 8 — repealed for England and Wales by Statute Law Revision Act 1863 (26 & 27 Vict. c. 125) and for Ireland by Statute Law (Ireland) Revision Act 1872 (35 & 36 Vict. c. 98)

For Prerogativa Regis, cited as 17 Edw. 2. Stat. 1 in The Statutes at Large, see Statutes of uncertain date.

For Modus faciendi Homagium et Fidelitatem, cited as 17 Edw. 2. Stat. 2 in The Statutes at Large, see Statutes of uncertain date.

==== Sources ====
- "17° Edw. II". The Statutes of the Realm. Vol. 1. pp. 193–196 – via HathiTrust.
- "Anno decimo septimo Edwardi II". The Statutes at Large. Vol. 1 – Magna Charta to 14 Edward III – 1225 to 1340. 16 April 1762. p. 385 – via Internet Archive.
- "Anno decimo septimo Edwardi II". The Statutes at Large. Vol. 1 – Magna Charta to 14 Edward III – 1225 to 1340. Cambridge, Printed by J. Bentham. 16 April 1762. p. 385 – via Internet Archive.
- Chronological Table of and Index to the Statutes. Vol. 1: To the End of the Session 59 Vict. Sess. 2 (1895) (13th ed.). London: Her Majesty's Stationery Office. 1896. p. 19 – via Google Books.
- Chronological Table of the Statutes: Covering the Period from 1235 to the End of 1971. London: Her Majesty's Stationery Office. 1972. p. 16. ISBN 978-0-11-840096-1 – via Google Books.

== 1324 (17 Edw. 2) ==
This session was also traditionally cited as 17 Ed. 2 or 17 E. 2.

Statutum de Terris Templariosum or Templars' Lands Act 1324 (Statute concerning the Lands of the Templars) 17 Edw. 2 Stat. 2 — cited as 17 Edw. 2. Stat. 3 in The Statutes at Large; repealed by Statute Law Revision Act 1948 (11 & 12 Geo. 6. c. 62)

=== Sources ===
- "17° Edw. II". The Statutes of the Realm. Vol. 1. pp. 193–196 – via HathiTrust.
- "Anno decimo septimo Edwardi II". The Statutes at Large. Vol. 1 – Magna Charta to 14 Edward III – 1225 to 1340. 16 April 1762. p. 385 – via Internet Archive.
- "Anno decimo septimo Edwardi II". The Statutes at Large. Vol. 1 – Magna Charta to 14 Edward III – 1225 to 1340. Cambridge, Printed by J. Bentham. 16 April 1762. p. 385 – via Internet Archive.
- Chronological Table of and Index to the Statutes. Vol. 1: To the End of the Session 59 Vict. Sess. 2 (1895) (13th ed.). London: Her Majesty's Stationery Office. 1896. p. 19 – via Google Books.
- Chronological Table of the Statutes: Covering the Period from 1235 to the End of 1971. London: Her Majesty's Stationery Office. 1972. p. 16. ISBN 978-0-11-840096-1 – via Google Books.

== 1325 (18 Edw. 2) ==
This session was also traditionally cited as 18 Ed. 2 or 18 E. 2.

For The Statute for View of Frankpledge, cited as 18 Edw. 2 in The Statutes at Large, see Visus Franciplegii under Statutes of uncertain date.

== See also ==
- List of acts of the Parliament of England
