= William de Kingescote =

English university chancellor

William de Kingescote was an English medieval university chancellor.

During 1289–90, William de Kingescote was Chancellor of the University of Oxford. He was admitted by the Bishop of Lincoln, Oliver Sutton.

Academic offices
Preceded by Robert Winchelsey	Chancellor of the University of Oxford; 1289–1290	Succeeded by John de Ludlow
