= Statute forbidding Bearing of Armour =

1313 Act of the Parliament of England

- Act of Parliament
- Parliament of England
- Long title: Statuto sup' Arportam'to Armor
- Citation: 7 Edw. 2. St. 1
- Territorial extent: England and Wales; Ireland

Dates
- Royal assent: 13 October 1313
- Commencement: 9 September 1313 (Note: Start of session.)

Status: Current legislation

Text of statute as originally enacted

Revised text of statute as amended

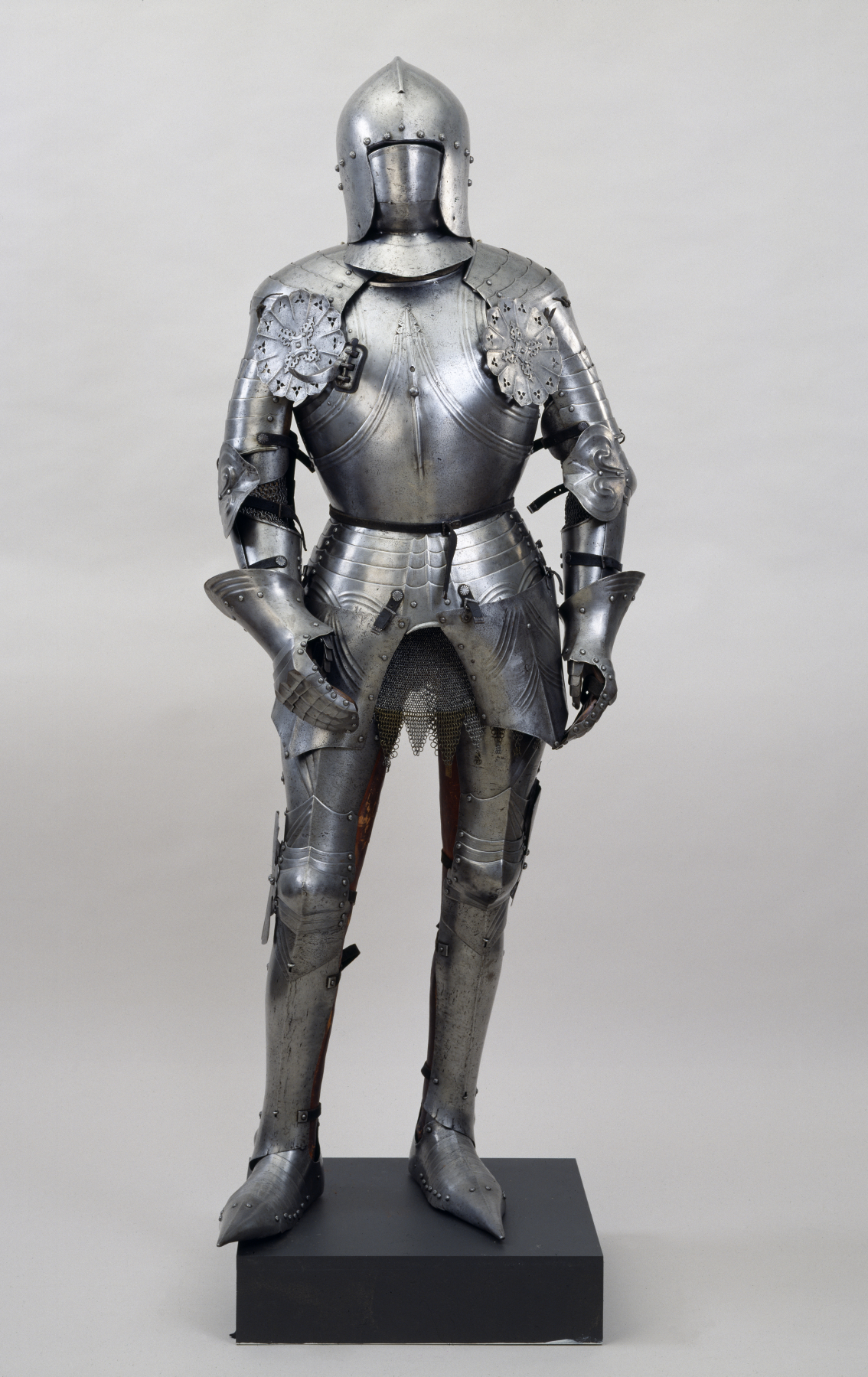
A suit of armour; not allowed in Parliament

The Statute forbidding Bearing of Armour (7 Edw. 2. St. 1) or Coming Armed to Parliament Act 1313 (originally titled Statuto sup' Arportam'to Armor or Statutum de Defensione portandi Arma) was enacted in 1313 during the reign of Edward II of England. It decrees "that in all Parliaments, Treatises and other Assemblies, which should be made in the Realm of England for ever, that every Man shall come without all Force and Armour". The statute, which was written in the Anglo-Norman language, goes on to assert the royal power to "defend Force of Armour, and all other Force against our Peace, at all Times when it shall please Us, and to punish them which shall do contrary." It declares that "Prelates, Earls, Barons, and the Commonalty of our Realm... are bound to aid Us as their Sovereign Lord at all Seasons, when need shall be."

The statute was issued following a period of political turmoil in England which had culminated in the declaration of the Ordinances of 1311 (5 Edw. 2) – a set of regulations imposed on the king by the English peerage and clergy to restrict his power. The role of the king's favourite, the relatively low-born Piers Gaveston, was a particular source of tension between Edward and his nobles. The barons forced Edward to send Gaveston into exile in a parliament held in April 1308, which they may have attended under arms.

When Gaveston returned from his exile in Ireland in 1309, he further infuriated the kingdom's most senior nobles by treating them with contempt, giving them crude nicknames such as "Burstbelly" and "Whoreson". They refused to attend parliaments called for October 1309 and February 1310, citing Gaveston's presence as the reason. Edward sought to placate them on the latter occasion by sending Gaveston out of London and ordering the earls to come unarmed to parliament. Instead, they raised armed retinues which camped on the outskirts of London and presented themselves fully armed before the king, in open defiance of his edict. The outcome of the parliament was the creation of a council of nobles which eventually produced the Ordinances a year later. The Earls of Lancaster, Warwick and Hereford also attended the parliament of September 1312 fully armed.

Edward's enactment of the 1313 statute represented at least his fifth attempt to rein in his nobles' tendency to use the threat of armed force as a means of bringing pressure at Parliament. Similar prohibitions were also issued in October 1308, February 1310, October 1311 and August 1312. However, the statute does not seem to have resolved the problem at the time. The Earl of Lancaster defied the statute by attending the parliaments of February 1316, October 1318 and May 1319 under arms, and in June 1318 was accused by the king's council of attending parliaments "a force e armes".

The law is still in force today, though the Crown Prosecution Service has said that it is unaware of anyone being prosecuted under this or other archaic statutes in recent times. According to a CPS spokeswoman, "If anyone was caught in the Houses of Parliament wearing armour it would first be a matter for the police." During the 2026 Clacton by-election, the act received some media attention in the context of the question of whether novelty candidate Count Binface would be allowed to wear his costume in the house if elected.
