= Thomas Cobham =

Archbishop-elect of Canterbury and Bishop of Worcester (died 1327)

Thomas Cobham D.Th., D.Cn.L.
- Bishop of Worcester
- Church: Catholic Church
- Province: Canterbury
- Appointed: 31 March 1317
- Installed: 28 October 1317
- Term ended: 27 August 1327
- Predecessor: Walter Maidstone
- Successor: Wulstan Bransford
- Previous posts: Archbishop-elect of Canterbury (May–October 1313)

Orders
- Consecration: 22 May 1317

Personal details
- Died: 27 August 1327

Thomas Cobham (died 1327) was an English churchman, who was Archbishop-elect of Canterbury in 1313 and later Bishop of Worcester from 1317 to 1327.

Cobham earned a Doctor of Theology and a Doctor of Canon Law and served as Archdeacon of Lewes from 1301 to around 1305. Cobham was nominated to replace Archbishop Robert Winchelsey in 1313, by the monks of Christ Church Priory, Canterbury. The election took place on 28 May 1313. King Edward II intervened and petitioned the pope to appoint the Bishop of Worcester – Walter Reynolds to Canterbury instead of Cobham. Pope Clement V acquiesced and issued a bull dismissing the election of Cobham on 1 October 1313 and installing Reynolds in his stead.

On 31 March 1317, Cobham was provided to the bishopric of Worcester, and was consecrated on 22 May 1317.

Cobham died on 27 August 1327. His library was given to the University of Oxford.

He may have been Chancellor of the University of Cambridge, but there is confusion with another similarly named person who was also Chancellor in the 15th century.

== Citations ==
Academic offices
| Preceded by John Rickingale | Chancellor of the University of Cambridge; 1422–1423 | Succeeded by Robert FitzHugh |
Catholic Church titles
| Preceded by Robert Winchelsey (archbishop) | Archbishop-elect of Canterbury; May–October 1313 | Succeeded by Walter Reynolds (archbishop) |
| Preceded by Walter Maidstone | Bishop of Worcester; 1317–1327 | Succeeded by Wulstan Bransford |
