= Robert Winchelsey =

Archbishop of Canterbury from 1293 to 1313

- Archbishop of Canterbury
- Elected: 13 February 1293
- Term ended: 11 May 1313
- Predecessor: John Peckham
- Successor: Thomas Cobham

Orders
- Consecration: September 1294 by Pope Celestine V

Personal details
- Died: 11 May 1313 Otford
- Buried: Canterbury Cathedral

Robert Winchelsey (or Winchelsea; c. 1245 – 11 May 1313) was an English Catholic theologian and Archbishop of Canterbury. He studied at the universities of Paris and Oxford, and later taught at both. Influenced by Thomas Aquinas, he was a scholastic theologian.

Winchelsey held various benefices in England and was the Chancellor of Oxford University before being elected to Canterbury in early 1293. Although he initially had the support of Edward I, Winchelsey later became a forceful opponent of the king. The archbishop was encouraged by the papacy to resist Edward's attempts to tax the clergy. Winchelsey was also an opponent of the king's treasurer Walter Langton, as well as other clergy. On one occasion, he rebuked an abbot so sternly that the abbot suffered a fatal heart attack.

Following the election of a former royal clerk as Pope Clement V in 1305, the king was able to secure the archbishop's exile that same year. Upon the succession of Edward's son, Edward II, Winchelsey was allowed to return to England after the new king petitioned the pope to allow his return. Winchelsey soon joined the king's enemies, however, and was the only bishop to object to the return of the king's favourite, Piers Gaveston. Winchelsey died in 1313. Although miracles were alleged to have happened at his tomb, an attempt to have him declared a saint was unsuccessful.

== Early life ==
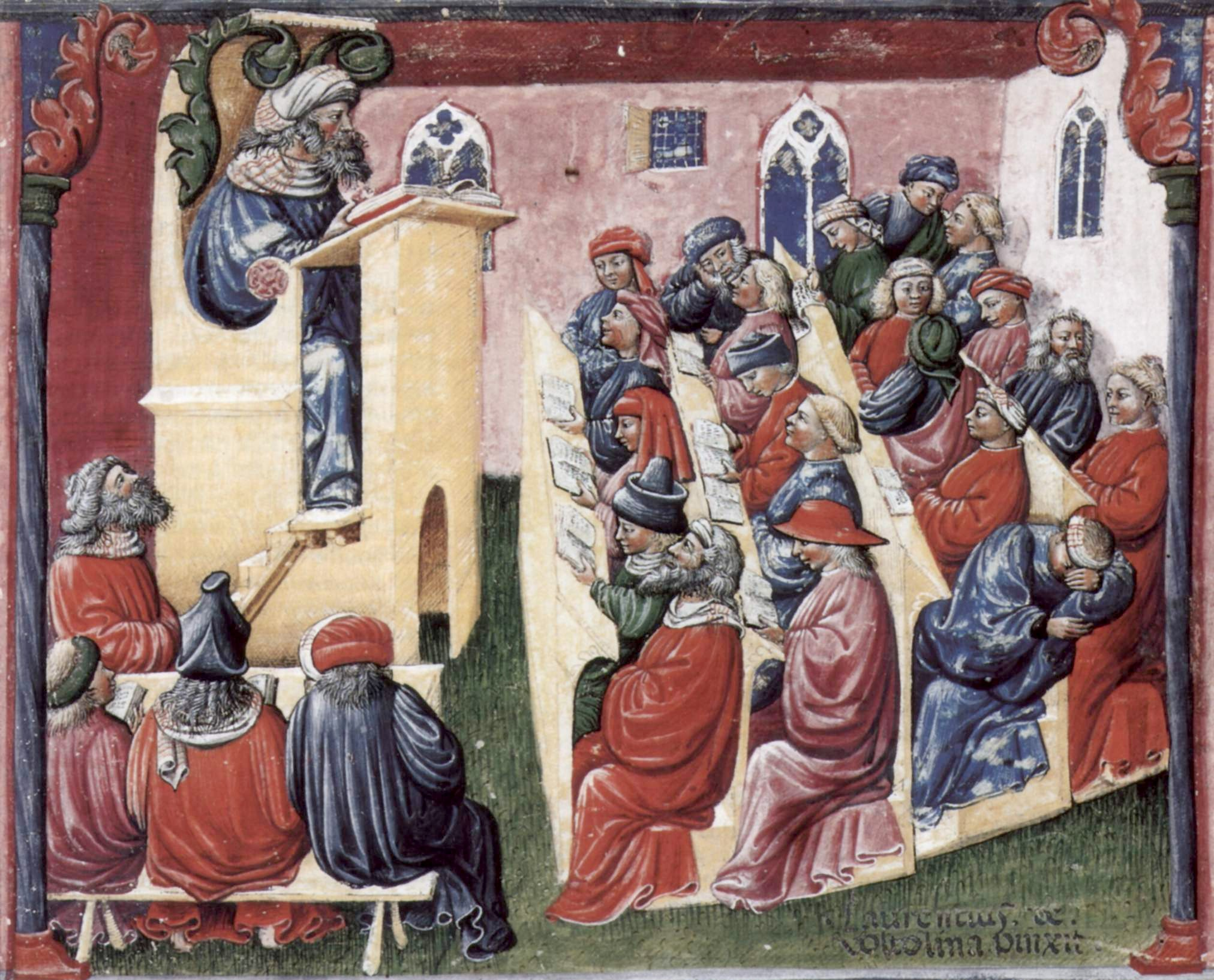
Medieval lecturer from a painting by Laurentius de Voltolina, second half of the 14th century. Robert would have taught much like this.

Winchelsey studied and taught at the universities of Paris and Oxford, and became the Rector of Paris and Chancellor of Oxford. While in Paris, he read, and possibly met, Thomas Aquinas, and his own theology was thereafter purely scholastic.

In 1283, Winchelsey was appointed canon of St. Paul's in London, but it is unclear exactly when he returned to England. He held the prebend of Oxgate in the diocese of London, and was made Archdeacon of Essex, also in the London diocese, in about 1288.

== Archbishop ==
=== Election ===
John Peckham, Archbishop of Canterbury, died in December 1292. On 13 February 1293, Winchelsey was elected as his successor. Unusually, neither the pope nor the king had a hand in his election. On 1 April, Winchelsey left England for Rome to get papal confirmation. He was not consecrated immediately because of a papal vacancy; Pope Celestine V eventually performed the ceremony at Aquila on 12 September 1294.

=== Disputes with Edward I ===
Winchelsey was a fearless opponent of Edward I. When he swore his oath of fealty to Edward, he offended the king by adding a declaration that he was only swearing fealty for the temporalities, not the spiritualities. All through his term as archbishop, he refused to allow Edward to tax the clergy beyond certain levels and withstood severe pressure to change his mind. In August 1295, he offered the king a tenth of all ecclesiastical revenues, less than Edward had hoped to collect from the clergy. Winchelsey did concede, though, that if the war with France, which was what the money was requested to fund, continued into the following year, then the clergy would be amenable to making further contributions.

Following the issue of the papal bull Clericis laicos in 1296, forbidding the payment of taxes to a secular power, Winchelsey urged his clergy in 1297 to refuse payments to Edward. However, the clergy of the province of York paid a tax of a fifth of their revenues. Edward then declared clerics who refused to pay outlaws and ordered their property to be seized. He conceded that the clergy could return to his protection if they paid a fine of a fifth of their revenues, exactly what the northern clergy had offered in the way of taxation. The royal clerks and many other clergy paid the fines, and in March, the southern clergy met again, and after a long debate, Winchelsey instructed each clerk to decide for himself whether or not to pay the fine. It appears that most chose to pay, but the archbishop still refused to make any contribution, and so Edward seized his lands. They were returned to him in July 1297, when the king and prelate were reconciled at Westminster. Winchelsey then tried to mediate between Edward and the earls, who also objected to Edward's tax demands.

Winchelsey further irritated Edward with his opposition to the Bishop of Lichfield, Walter Langton, who was the king's treasurer. The king was not the only one to be upset by the archbishop; the abbot of Oseney, in 1297, was so affected by a rebuke from him that he suffered a fatal heart attack. In 1299, Winchelsey and the king briefly reconciled, and the archbishop presided at the king's second marriage, to Margaret of France, at Canterbury. Winchelsey vigorously asserted his authority over his suffragan, or subordinate bishops, quarrelled with Pope Boniface VIII over a Sussex living, and was excommunicated by one of the pope's clerks in 1301. He was absolved in 1302.

=== Exile and return ===
Winchelsey and the barons joined in demanding reforms from the king at the parliament of Lincoln in 1301, but Winchelsey's support of Boniface VIII's claim to be the protector of Scotland broke the alliance. One of the reasons that led the archbishop to ally with the barons was his hostility to Edward's adviser, Walter Langton, Bishop of Lichfield. The king took no action against Winchelsey until the Gascon and former royal clerk Bertrand de Got was named Pope Clement V in 1305. Edward then sent two envoys – Langton and Henry Lacy – to the pope, to press his claim that Winchelsey was plotting against him. Clement suspended the archbishop on 12 February 1306. Winchelsey left England and went to the papal court at Bordeaux, where he stayed until Edward's death in July 1307. Only Antony Bek, Bishop of Durham supported the archbishop.

After the death of Edward I, the new king, Edward II, asked that Winchelsey be restored, which the pope agreed to on 22 January 1308. Soon after his return to England in early 1308, the archbishop joined the king's enemies. The archbishop, along with Guy de Beauchamp, the Earl of Warwick, were the only people to object to the return of the new king's favourite Piers Gaveston to England in 1309. Winchelsey aided the barons in their prosecution of Edward II by sentencing their enemies to excommunication. He was appointed an Ordainer in 1310, and died at Otford on 11 May 1313.

== Legacy ==
Winchelsey was a preacher of some note, and when preaching at St. Paul's, he attracted large crowds to his sermons and lectures. Winchelsey's theological writings date primarily from his time at St. Paul's, where he delivered a number of quodlibeta. The quaestiones disputatae from those sessions survive, and illustrate his highly orthodox trinitarian views and his scholastic method. Miracles were said to have been worked at his tomb in Canterbury Cathedral, but efforts to have him declared a saint have been unsuccessful.

== Citations ==
Catholic Church titles
Preceded by John Peckham	Archbishop of Canterbury; 1294–1313	Succeeded by Walter Reynolds (Thomas Cobham as archbishop-elect)
Academic offices
Preceded by Hervey de Saham	Chancellor of the University of Oxford; 1288–1289	Succeeded by William de Kingescote
