= Walter Reynolds =

English archbishop and official (died 1327)

- Archbishop of Canterbury
- Church: Catholic Church
- Appointed: 1313
- Installed: January 1314
- Term ended: 16 November 1327
- Predecessor: Robert Winchelsey
- Successor: Simon Mepeham
- Other post: Bishop of Worcester

Orders
- Consecration: 13 October 1308

Personal details
- Died: 16 November 1327

Lord High Treasurer
- In office 1307–1310
- Monarch: Edward II
- Preceded by: Walter Langton
- Succeeded by: John Sandall

Keeper of the Great Seal
- In office 1310–1314
- Monarch: Edward II
- Preceded by: John Langton
- Succeeded by: John Sandall

Walter Reynolds (died 1327) was Bishop of Worcester and then Archbishop of Canterbury (1313–1327) as well as Lord High Treasurer and Lord Chancellor.

== Early career ==
Reynolds was the son of a baker from Windsor, Berkshire, and became a clerk, or chaplain, in the service of Edward I.

Reynolds held several livings and, owing perhaps to his acting skill, he became a prime favourite with the Prince of Wales, afterwards Edward II, whom he served as Keeper of the Great Wardrobe. Just after the prince became king, on 22 August 1307 Reynolds, was appointed Treasurer of England.

On 13 November 1307 Reynolds, who had the living of St Mary's Church, Wimbledon was elected Bishop of Worcester and consecrated on 13 October 1308. He was also on 6 July 1310 named Keeper of the Great Seal and Lord Chancellor of England. Amongst his duties as Bishop of Worcester was to act as the patron and appoint the headmaster of the school that later became the Royal Grammar School Worcester.

Reynolds was one of the godfathers of the future Edward III when the prince was christened on 17 November 1312.

== Episcopate ==
When Robert Winchelsea, Archbishop of Canterbury, died in May 1313 Edward II convinced Pope Clement V to appoint his favourite to the vacant archbishopric, and Reynolds was enthroned at Canterbury Cathedral in January 1314 as the 51st Archbishop.

Although the private life of the new archbishop appears to have been the reverse of exemplary, he attempted to carry out some very necessary reforms in his new official capacity; he also continued the struggle for precedence, which had been carried on for many years between the archbishops of Canterbury and of York. In this connection in 1317 he laid London under an interdict after William de Melton, the Archbishop of York, had passed through its streets with his cross borne erect before him.

Reynolds remained in general loyal to Edward II until 1324, when with all his suffragans he opposed the king in defence of the Bishop of Hereford, Adam Orleton. He then fought with Edward II over liturgical issues, and sent sums of money to Queen Isabella in her rebellion against the King. Having fled for safety into Kent he returned to London and declared for Edward III, whom he crowned on 1 February 1327. He was appointed as a member of the regency council for Edward III that was formed in February 1327. In 1327 Reynolds popularised in England the political argument of vox populi, vox Dei, contrary to Alcuin's original warning to Charlemagne to resist such arguments, as the title of his sermon laying charges against Edward II.

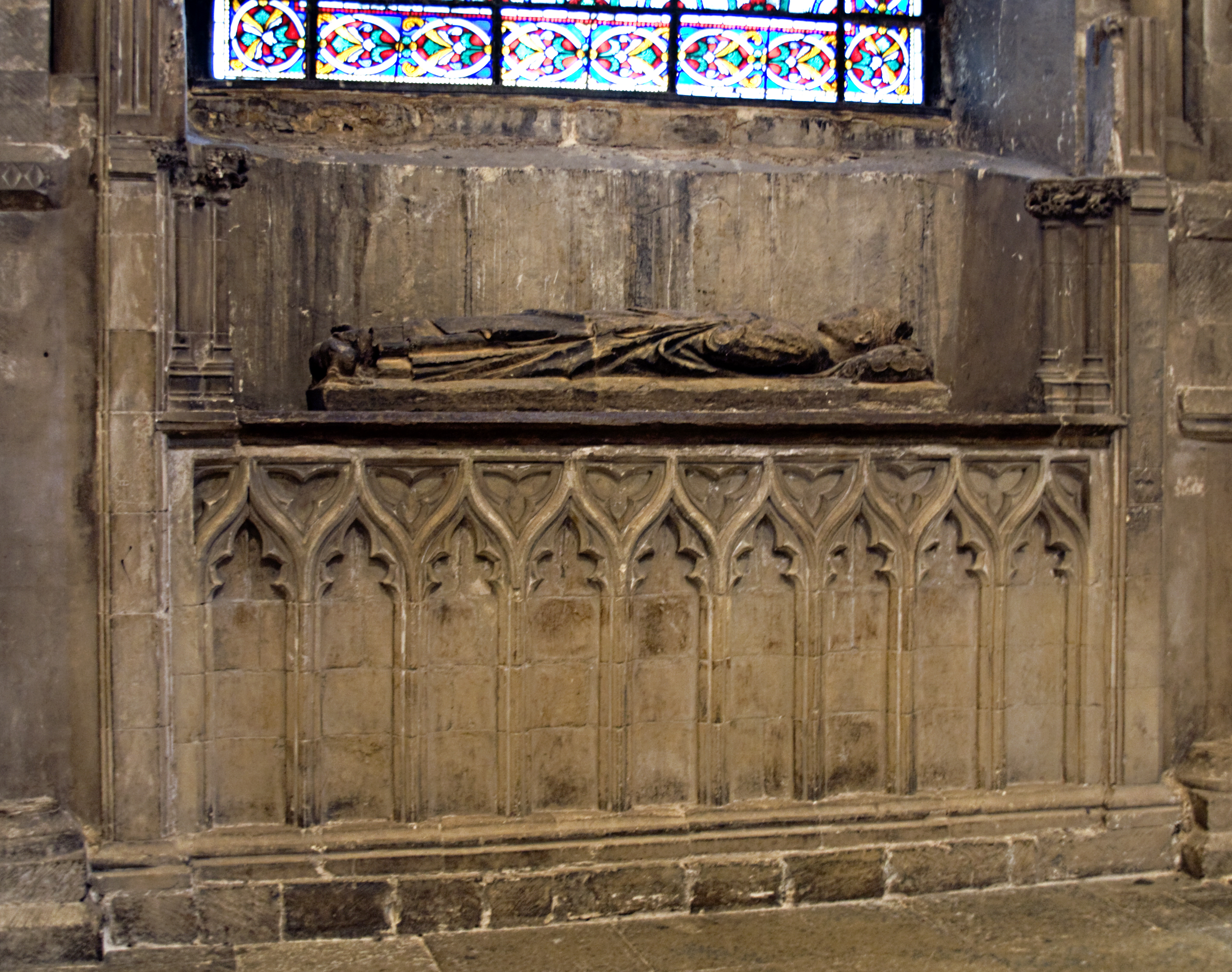
Tomb of Reynolds in Canterbury Cathedral

Reynolds died at Mortlake on 16 November 1327.

== Citations ==
Political offices
Preceded by Walter Langton	Lord High Treasurer; 1307–1310	Succeeded by John Sandall
Preceded by John Langton as Lord Chancellor	Keeper of the Great Seal; 1310–1314	Succeeded by John Sandall
Catholic Church titles
Preceded by William Gainsborough	Bishop of Worcester; 1307–1313	Succeeded by Walter Maidstone
Preceded by Robert Winchelsey; Thomas Cobham as archbishop-elect	Archbishop of Canterbury; 1313–1327	Succeeded by Simon Mepeham
