= John of Monmouth (bishop) =

Bishop of Llandaff (died 1323)

John of Monmouth DD (in Latin Johannes de Monemuta; died 1323) was a medieval university Chancellor and Bishop of Llandaff.

John of Monmouth was Chancellor of the University of Oxford in England during 1322–24. He was a Doctor of Divinity. He was later Bishop of Llandaff in Wales from 1297 to his death in 1323.

== See also ==
- Monmouth in Wales

Academic offices
Preceded by John de Ludlow	Chancellor of the University of Oxford; 1290–1291	Succeeded by Simon of Ghent
Catholic Church titles
Preceded by Philip de Staunton	Bishop of Llandaff; 1297–1323	Succeeded by Alexander de Monmouth
