= London uprising =

1326 rebellion in the Kingdom of England

Coordinates: 51°30′29.57″N 0°4′33.92″W

- Part of Invasion of England (1326)
Date	2–16 October 1326
Location	London, England
Result	Contrariants' victory

Belligerents
Royalists	Contrariants

Commanders and leaders
Eleanor de Clare (surrendered); Walter de Stapledon †; Richard Stapledon †	Richard de Betoyne

Strength
Unknown	Unknown

Casualties and losses
Unknown	Unknown

The London uprising was a major event of the 1326 Invasion of England. Isabella of France, the wife of King Edward II, took the City of London, the principal city of the Kingdom of England, after her husband the King abandoned the Tower and fled to the west.

== Background ==
In September, Isabella with her supporters, who included Roger Mortimer, landed by the River Orwell in Suffolk. She had no difficulty in raising an army from those opposed to the king, and they advanced on London. As Isabella neared London, she evaded a force under the Earl of Winchester sent by Edward to intercept her. Isabella's army of some 1,500 men had fought its way deep into England already, King Edward remaining in London throughout.

Isabella moved yet closer to the capital, with Edward and his most loyal forces holding the Tower of London. However, London was against him, and fearing a heavy defeat the king decided to leave the city and head west with his supporters, including the Earl of Winchester and the other Despensers. The small royal army retreated speedily to Gloucester, leaving the way clear for Isabella and Mortimer to take London without a fight. Isabella had almost completed her campaign.

== Outbreak ==
The direct inciting incident for the London populace was a series of letters sent by the Queen and her son, Prince Edward, to the Mayor and the community. These letters requested the city’s aid in their cause, "whence it came to pass that, with certain [men] of the city speaking against it, the whole people of the city rose up unanimously with the greatest impetus, promising that they wished to defend the cause of the queen even unto death, and to destroy the traitors and enemies of the kingdom", according to the annals of St. Paul's Cathedral.

The king and Hugh Despenser were aware of contact between the city's leading churchmen and merchants. The king sought the assurances of the people of London but received only a half-hearted response. As the army Edward had summoned to his defence had not materialised, he and Despenser arranged to flee the Tower and the city to avoid being cut off. Despenser's heavily pregnant wife, Eleanor de Clare, was made constable of the Tower until she was forced to surrender it to citizens days later.

== Rioting ==
A group known as the Riffleres (an early form of the world 'rifler') emerged, systematically plundering the treasures of those associated with the King’s regime, including Edmund FitzAlan, Earl of Arundel (whose treasure was stolen despite being hidden in the Priory of the Holy Trinity), the Bardi bankers with whom Despenser the younger had his treasure deposited, and the Chancellor, Robert Baldock.

The uprising in the city turned bloody on 15 October when the mob targeted high-ranking royal associates. Due to the violence, Isabella and Mortimer avoided trying to stake their claim on the city and instead chose to chase after the fleeing king, despite Roger's three sons and Isabella's second son with Edward, the ten-year-old Prince John of Eltham, being imprisoned in the Tower. The rioters broke into the Tower, arrested Clare and freed the prisoners including Prince John who, despite his age, the Londoners proclaimed as Warden of the City and of the Tower.

They then descended upon their unpopular mayor, Hamo de Chigwell, who was "crying for mercy with clasped hands" and forced to declare his allegiance to Isabella at the Guildhall.

The very first victim of mob violence was John le Marshall, a citizen who served as a secretary and associate to Hugh Despenser the younger. He was accused of being a "revealer [spy] of the city's counsel". The mob seized him at his house around the hour of noon and beheaded him in the middle of Cheapside. They may also have targeted Stephen Gravesend, who was Bishop of London, but he managed to escape the city.

=== Murder of Bishop Stapledon ===
Immediately following the killing of Marshall, the crowd moved to the London residence of Walter Stapledon, the Bishop of Exeter at Temple. They launched an assault with arms and fire until they gained entry, subsequently plundering his treasure and everything of value they found, and burning the episcopal registers.

The Bishop, who was a staunch loyalist and former Treasurer, attempted to reach the safety of the Tower of London. Upon entering the city through Newgate and reaching St Michael’s at the Corn, he heard the cries of the mob and fled toward St Paul’s Cathedral.

He was intercepted at the north door of the church, where the crowd pulled him from his horse. The mob dragged him through the churchyard, down Ludgate Hill to the Eleanor cross at Cheapside, where they stripped him of his armour and beheaded him with a knife, along with his two squires, J. de Padingtone and W. Walle. Their naked bodies were left in the middle of the forum as a "horrible spectacle" for the remainder of the day.

Some days later, Queen Isabella received his severed head as a trophy while she was at Gloucester. His body was initially buried under a rubbish tip after being refused burial at St. Clement Danes church. He was later reburied in Exeter cathedral. Isabella and Edward III appeared to regret the killing and instituted an inquiry. After three years, those responsible were condemned and executed.

== End of the Uprising ==
During the height of the tumult, Isabella sent a letter with Bishop Stratford authorising him to elect a new London mayor. Richard de Betoyne was elected Mayor in place of Hamo de Chigwell. Around the same time, John de Gisors was made Constable of the Tower.

Though the capture and execution of the King’s closest allies marked the functional end of the revolutionary violence, the fear instilled by the mob was so great that all formal legal proceedings in the city, including the ecclesiastical courts at St Paul's and the civil courts at the Guildhall, ceased entirely for nearly a year.

Meanwhile, high-ranking officials who had survived the initial violence sought to appease the mob. Archbishop Reynolds of Canterbury found it necessary to purchase the goodwill of the London commons with a gift of 50 tuns of wine to escape their further wrath.

In November, Hugh Despenser the younger was executed and, in early December, his head brought to London to be fixed upon London Bridge. There was still some residual unrest in the city as late as 11 December 1326, when a proclamation condemning lawlessness was issued. When the former chancellor Baldock was returned to London to face an ecclesiastical trial as a member of the clergy, the house where he was held was broken into and he was almost beaten to death, before being put in Newgate prison, where he was killed by inmates.

=== Restoration of Civic Authority ===
The political resolution occurred in January 1327 during a parliament at Westminster where Edward II was formally deposed, with the uprising effectively ending with the coronation of his son, Edward III on 1 February 1327. During the ceremony, the Mayor and citizens of London processed in silken garments, signalling their support for the new regime. After the coronation of the new king, Roger Mortimer rode to the Guildhall and pledged to "maintain the liberties" of the city.

The new king issued a charter of pardon to the citizens of London. This charter specifically pardoned the community for all homicides, robberies, and transgressions committed between the Queen’s landing on 24 September 1326 and the day of the coronation.

The King also released the city from all outstanding financial obligations and "demands" owed to his father, effectively wiping the slate clean for the Londoners who had supported the uprising.

Though during the rioting Queen Isabella was not able to enter the city, the support of the leaders and citizens of London as demonstrated by the uprising was one of the crucial factors in securing her position and therefore the success of the invasion overall.

== Sources ==
- Valente, C. (1998). "The Deposition and Abdication of Edward II". The English Historical Review. 113 (453): 852–881. doi:10.1093/ehr/CXIII.453.852. OCLC 2207424.

== Sources ==
- timeref.com
