= Despenser War =

1321–22 English baronial revolt against Edward II

The Despenser War (1321–22) was a baronial revolt against Edward II of England led by the Marcher Lords Roger Mortimer and Humphrey de Bohun. The rebellion was fuelled by opposition to Hugh Despenser the Younger, the royal favourite. (Note: Some historians use the label the "Despenser War" to refer to just the second phase of the conflict; others apply it to the entire conflict. Others prefer the term the "Despenser Wars". The Welsh part of the campaign is occasionally termed the "Glamorgan war".) After the rebels' summer campaign of 1321, Edward was able to take advantage of a temporary peace to rally more support and a successful winter campaign in southern Wales, culminating in royal victory at the Battle of Boroughbridge in the north of England in March 1322. Edward's response to victory was his increasingly harsh rule until his fall from power in 1326.

== Causes of the war ==
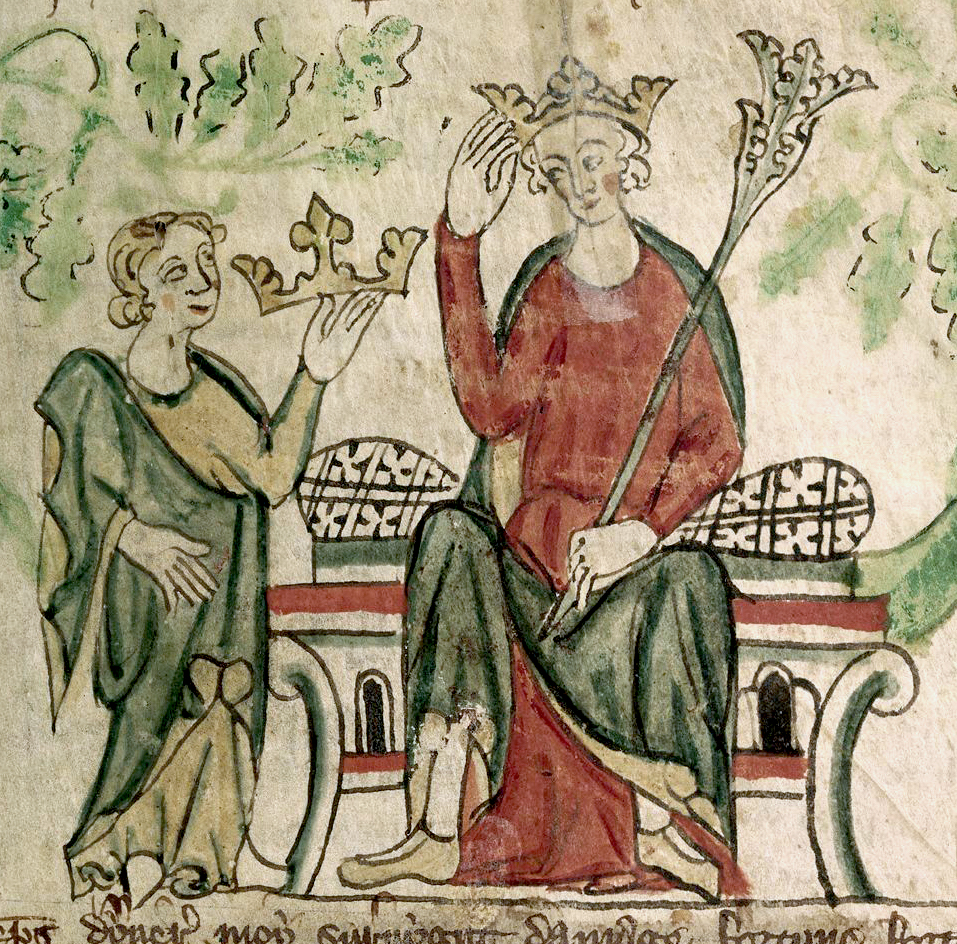
King Edward II, whose domination by his favourites, the Despensers, led to the Despenser War

The initial success of the rebels reflected the power of the Marcher Lords. Since Edward I's conquest of Wales, "[t]he marcher privileges remained undiminished, and the marcher energies which could no longer find employment in the struggle against the Welsh, sought new direction in the fertile field of English politics." The death of the last Earl of Gloucester also meant the redistribution of his vast estates and lordships in Ireland and Wales. The important Lordship of Glamorgan passed to the late earl's brother-in-law, the younger Despenser, married to his eldest sister Eleanor.

The Lords Ordainers, the powerful baronial hegemony led by the Earl of Lancaster, despised the younger Despenser and his father, the elder Despenser, on account of the influence they both wielded over the king. The council of Ordainers was formed in 1311 to reform the King's household, restrict his royal prerogatives, supervise the economy, and they insisted on the banishment of his then-favourite, Piers Gaveston, husband of the earl of Gloucester's sister Margaret. Gaveston was killed after he returned from exile.

Roger Mortimer, his uncle, Roger Mortimer de Chirk, and Humphrey de Bohun, a staunch Ordainer, were avowed enemies of the Despensers. The younger Despenser, through his marriage with Eleanor, received many expensive gifts, and much property and land grants in the Marches. The passage of Glamorgan to Despenser in its entirety angered his brothers-in-law, Roger d'Amory and Hugh de Audley, who were cheated out of their share of lands which rightfully belonged to them. Hostility deepened among the Marcher Lords when Despenser titled himself "Lord of Glamorgan" and "Earl of Gloucester".

== First phase: May–August 1321 ==
First phase
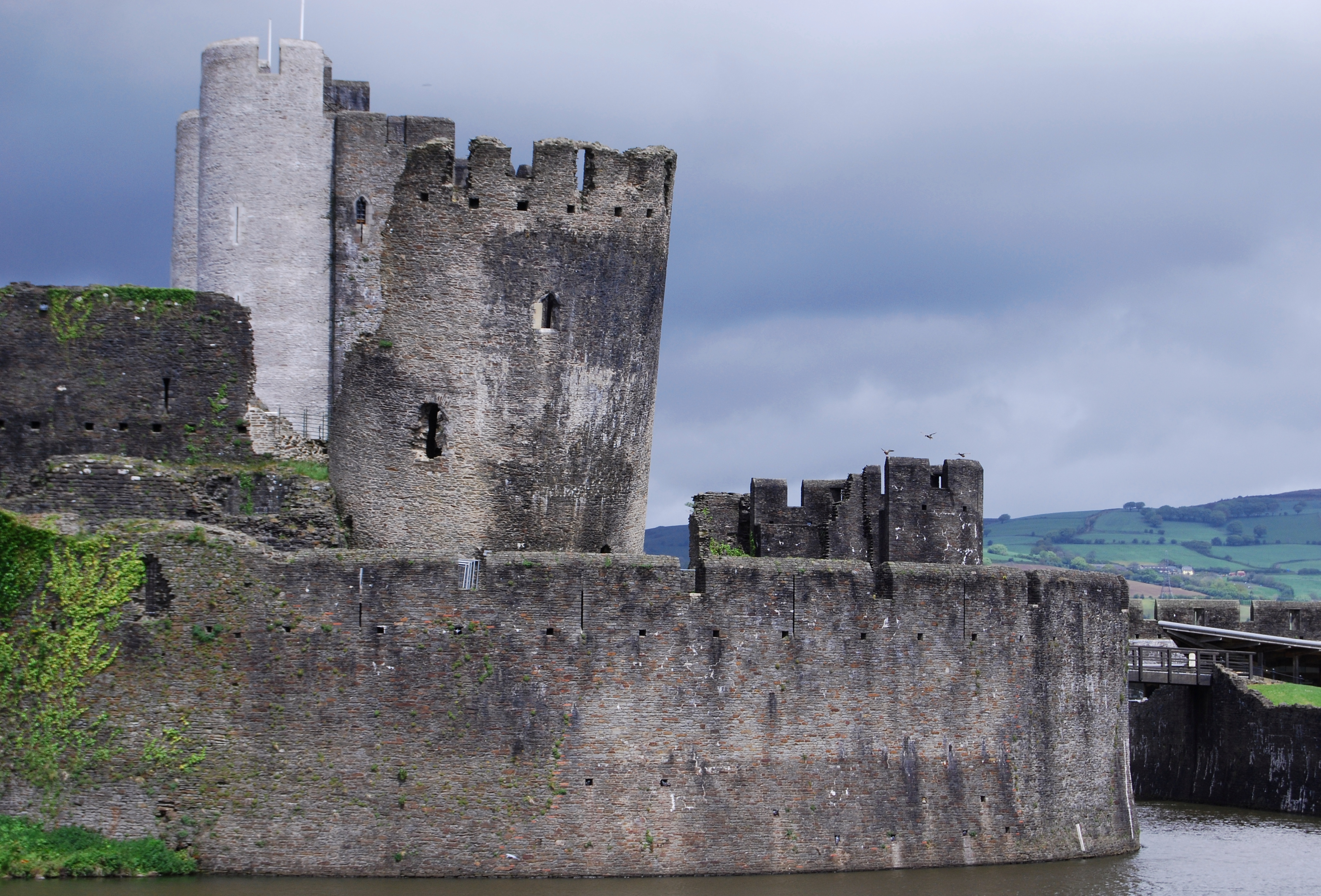
- Caerphilly Castle, one of the Despenser properties Roger Mortimer seized in May 1321.
Date	4 May – 14 August 1321
Location	Glamorgan and London
Result	Contrariants' victory: Exile of the Despensers

Belligerents
Royalists	Contrariants: Marcher Lords

Commanders and leaders
Edward II; Hugh Despenser the Elder; Hugh Despenser the Younger	Earl of Lancaster; Roger Mortimer; Earl of Hereford

In February 1321, Mortimer, Hereford and Lancaster agreed on an attack on the Despenser lands in Wales. Edward responded in March by mobilising his forces in Wales, demonstrating that he intended to make any attack on the Despensers an attack on the crown, and therefore treasonable. The king travelled to Gloucester and called upon the Marcher Lords to join him there; Mortimer and Hereford declined. Mobilising more forces, Edward marched on to Bristol, and repeated his call for the Marcher Lords to convene with him there in May. They again declined.

Mortimer and Hereford promptly began their attack on the Despenser lands. Newport, Cardiff and Caerphilly were seized by Mortimer in an intense eight-day campaign. Mortimer and Hereford then set about pillaging Glamorgan and Gloucestershire, before marching north to join Lancaster at Pontefract. The barons then swore an alliance at Sherburn-in-Elmet in June, naming their faction the "contrariants" and promising to remove the Despensers for good.

Edward had returned to London, where he held his own parliament to discuss courses of action. Mortimer led his army east towards London as well, reaching St Albans in late July. The city of London refused to let Mortimer's forces in, and his forces placed the capital under effective siege. Lancaster arrived in August to support him and a tense stand-off ensued, with the younger Despenser threatening the rebels from a ship on the River Thames, and the barons threatening to begin to destroy royal properties and lands outside London unless he desisted.

The Earl of Pembroke, a moderate baron with strong French links, intervened in an attempt to defuse the crisis. Edward continued to refuse to negotiate or exile the Despensers, so Pembroke arranged for Queen Isabella to publicly go down on her knees to appeal to Edward to exile the Despensers. This provided him with a face-saving excuse to exile the Despensers and defuse the crisis, but it was clear Edward intended to arrange their return at the first opportunity.

== Second phase: October 1321 – March 1322 ==
Second phase
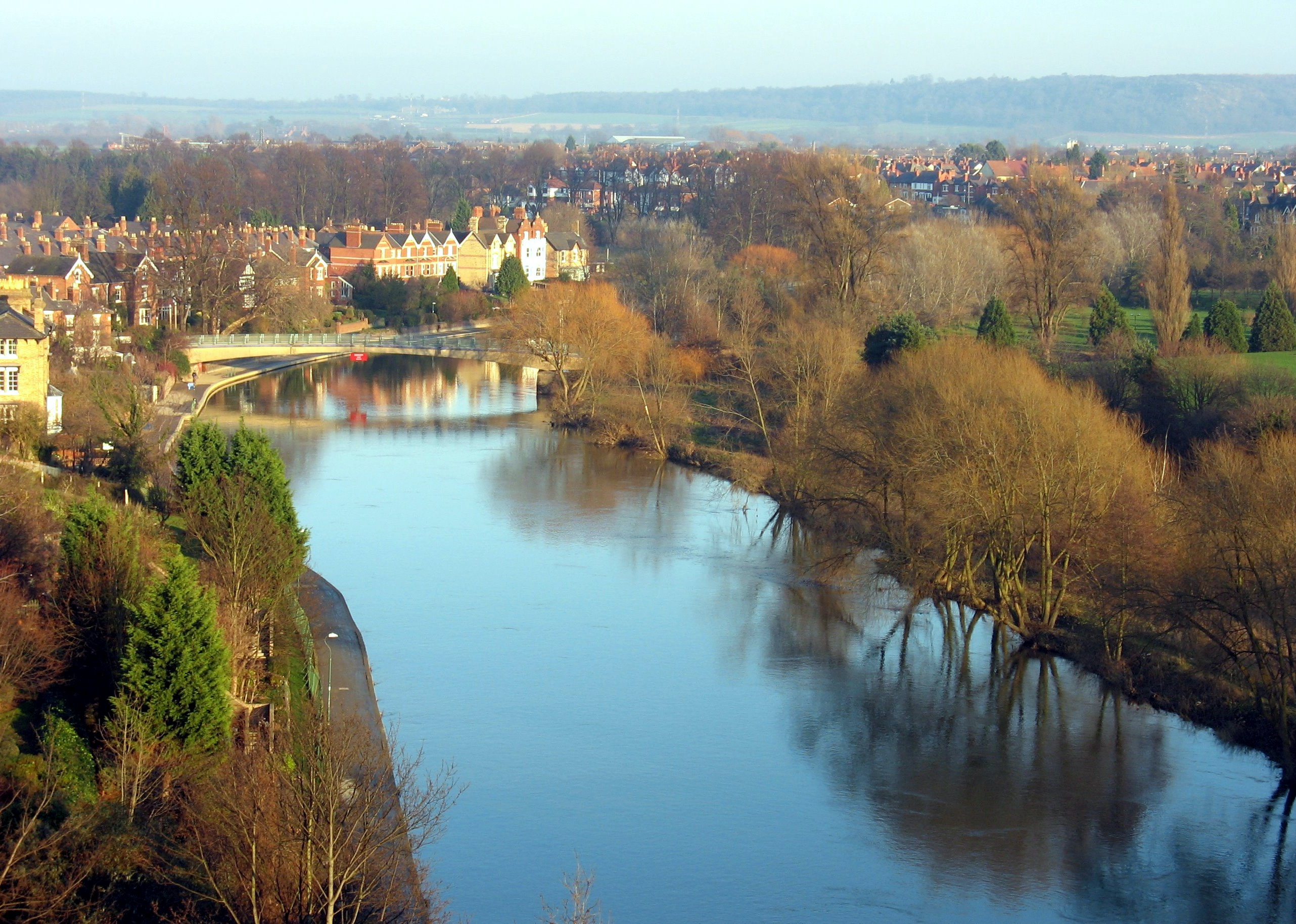
- The River Severn at Shrewsbury, where King Edward II defeated the Marcher Lords.
Date	13 October 1321 – 16 March 1322
Location	Kent, Wales and northern England
Result	Decisive Royal victory: Return of the Despensers; Execution of rebels; Revocation of the Ordinances of 1311; Strengthening of the monarchy until 1326

Belligerents
Royalists	Contrariants: Marcher Lords; Supported by: Kingdom of Scotland

Commanders and leaders
Edward II; Earl of Pembroke; Andrew Harclay	Earl of Lancaster (executed); Roger Mortimer (surrendered); Earl of Hereford †

Strength
12,000	over 1,000; less than 12,000

Despite the momentary respite, by the autumn of 1321, tension between Edward and the baronial opposition led by Thomas of Lancaster was extremely high, with both sides raising forces across the country. At this point, Isabella undertook a pilgrimage to Canterbury, leaving the traditional route to stop at Leeds Castle; its governor, Bartholomew de Badlesmere, was steward of the King's household but by 1321 had joined the opposition. Historians suggest this was a deliberate act by Isabella on Edward's behalf to create a casus belli.

Badlesmere was away at the time, leaving his wife Margaret in charge; when she refused the Queen admittance, fighting broke out between Isabella's guards and the garrison. Edward now mobilised his supporters and besieged the castle, giving Isabella the Great Seal and control of the royal Chancery. The attack on the Queen meant he was joined by many moderates and volunteers from London; chroniclers claim he soon had 30,000 men, although this is almost certainly an overestimate. When the castle surrendered at the end of October, its defenders were executed.

Edward's position was much stronger than in August, and he now revoked the banishment of the Despensers. It was clear his opponents could expect little mercy; when Mortimer and Hereford travelled north meet with Lancaster, the three reaffirmed their opposition to Edward. However, Mortimer and Hereford were forced to return to the Welsh Marches to deal with a peasant revolt, while in December Edward marched to Cirencester, preparing to invade.

In the north, Lancaster tried to enlist the support of the Scots in a bid to bring more forces to bear before Edward could retake Wales. In January 1322, Edward finally overcame resistance along the River Severn and advanced into the Marches; despite attacking and burning Bridgnorth, Roger Mortimer and his uncle, Roger Mortimer de Chirk recognised their position was hopeless and surrendered at Shrewsbury on 22 January 1322.

Edward turned north, assisted by the Despensers who had secretly returned from exile in mid-January. After mustering his men at Coventry in February, he advanced on Burton on Trent, where Lancaster and Hereford had fortified bridge over the River Trent. Realising they were outnumbered, the rebels withdrew, but on 16 March an army led by the Earl of Carlisle defeated them at the Battle of Boroughbridge. Hereford was killed in the fighting, Lancaster and another forty captured knights were beheaded shortly after.

== Aftermath ==
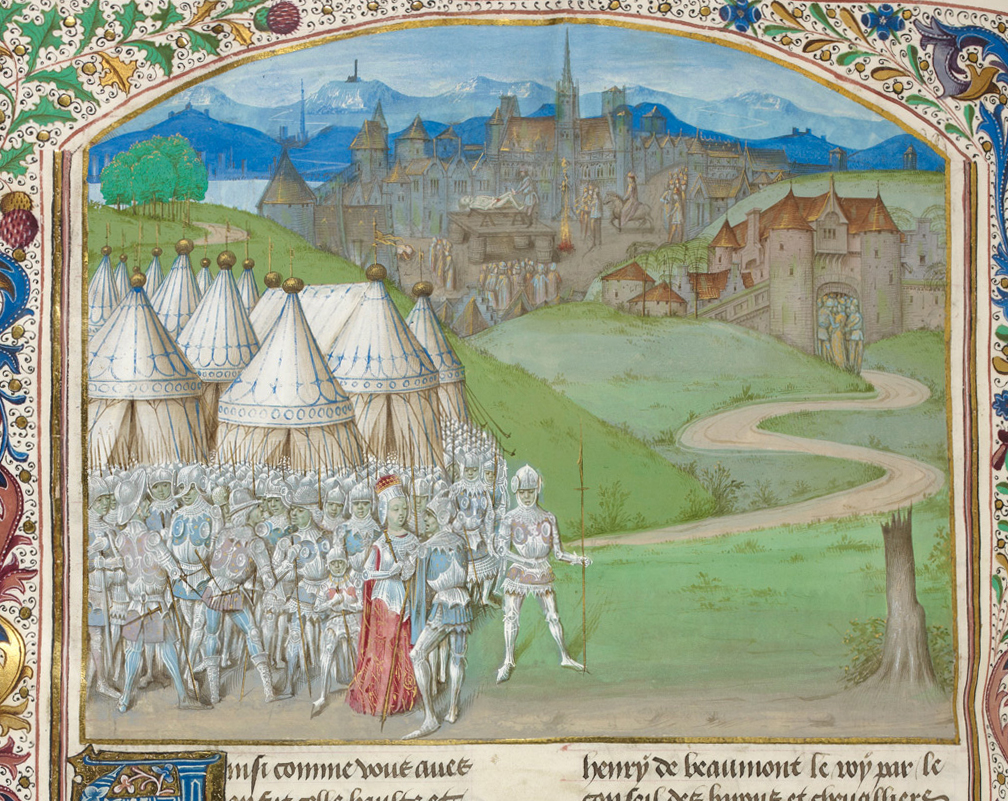
15th-century illustration showing Queen Isabella and Roger Mortimer; execution of Hugh Despenser the Younger in the background

Victory left Edward and the Despensers firmly in control of England and the Welsh Marches. The Despenser War "totally changed the political scene in England". It proved a catalyst for the disintegration of the baronial oligarchy, allowing Edward to regain the powers lost by the Ordinances of 1311. With Thomas of Lancaster's death, the Scots, who supported his rebellion as a means to cripple the English in the First Scottish War of Independence saw the opportunity to gain his possessions in The Great Raid of 1322.

Roger Mortimer was imprisoned in the Tower of London after his surrender at Shrewsbury and some of his supporters, including William Trussell, continued to raid Despenser lands. In August 1323 Mortimer escaped and attempted to break other Contrariants out of Windsor and Wallingford Castles. He eventually fled to France where he was later joined by Queen Isabella, who was ostensibly on a peace mission, but was actually seeking assistance from her brother, King Charles IV of France to oust the Despensers. Mortimer and Isabella obtained the necessary help in Flanders and in 1326 the successful Invasion of England was launched.

This invasion led to the executions of the two Despensers, the deposition and killing of Edward II, and the seizure of authority by Queen Isabella and Roger Mortimer, who became the de facto rulers of England from 1327 to 1330. Mortimer was hanged in November 1330 by the order of Isabella's son King Edward III after he ousted his mother and Mortimer from power and assumed personal rule.

== Bibliography ==
- Costain, Thomas Bertam. (1962) The Three Edwards. London: Doubleday.
- Davies, J. Conway. (1915) "The Despenser War in Glamorgan", Transactions of the Royal Historical Society, Third Series 9: 21–64.
- Doherty, Paul C. (2003) Isabella and the Strange Death of Edward II. London: Robinson. ISBN 1-84119-843-9
- Fryde, Natalie (1979). The Tyranny and fall of Edward II 1321–1326. Cambridge: Cambridge University Press.
- Mortimer, Ian. (2008) The Perfect King: The Life of Edward III, Father of the English Nation. London: Vintage Books. ISBN 978-0-09-952709-1
- Oman, Charles (1904). A History of England. Edward Arnold.
- Patent Rolls. Westminster: Parliament of England. 1232–1509.
- Parliamentary Writs Alphabetical Digest. Vol. II. London: Public Record Office. 1834.
- Weir, Alison. (2006) Queen Isabella: She-Wolf of France, Queen of England. London: Pimlico Books. ISBN 978-0-7126-4194-4
