= Siege of Bristol =

Siege of Bristol or Storming of Bristol may refer to:

- Siege of Bristol (1326)
- Storming of Bristol (1643)
- Siege of Bristol (1645)
