= Siege of Bristol (1326) =

Military action in England

Coordinates: 51.4558°N 2.5869°W

- Part of Invasion of England (1326)
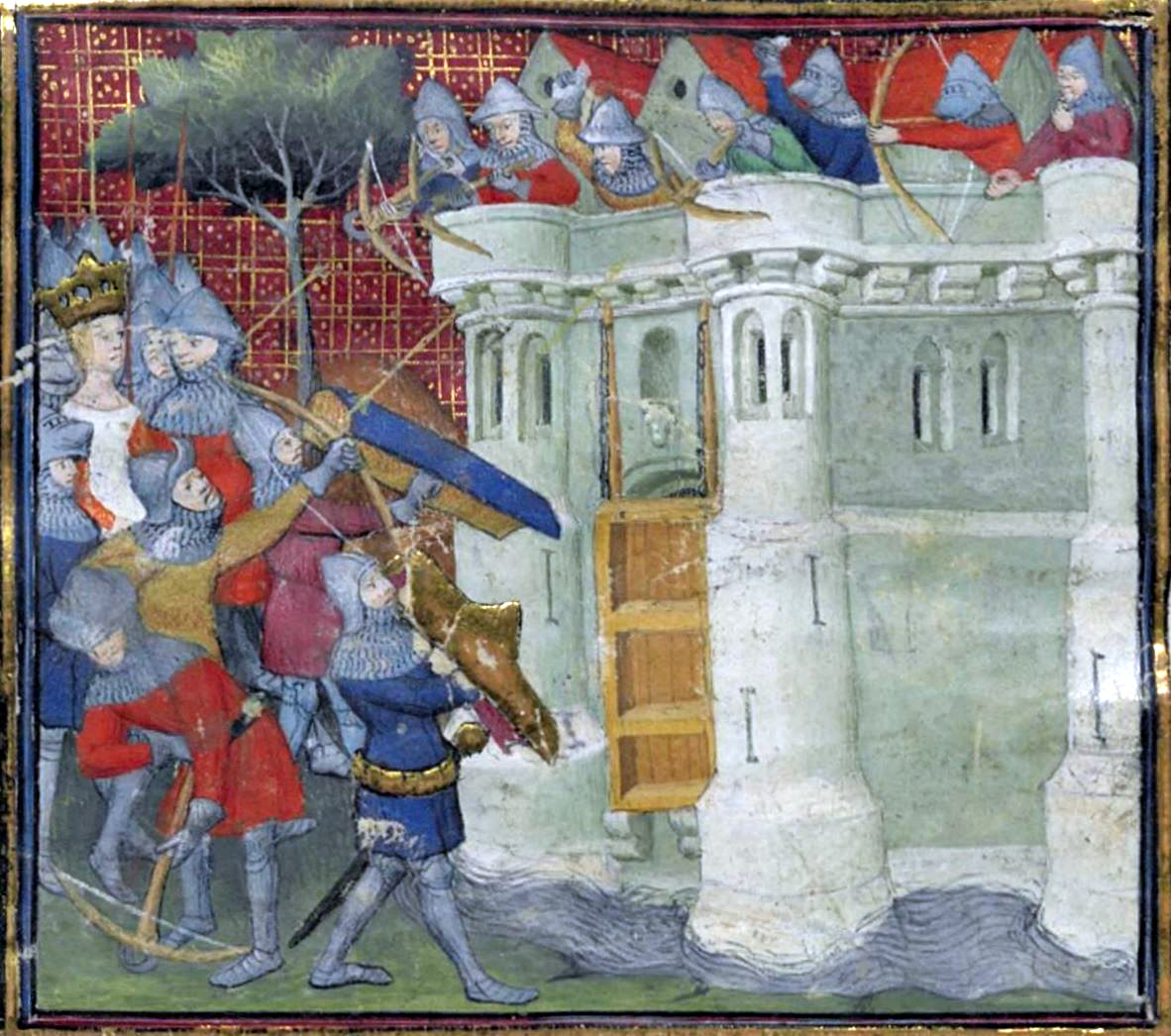
- Isabella oversees the siege.
Date	18–26 October 1326
Location	Bristol, England
Result	Contrariants' victory

Belligerents
Royalists	Contrariants

Commanders and leaders
Earl of Winchester (executed)	Queen Isabella; Roger Mortimer; Earl of Leicester; Earl of Norfolk; Earl of Kent

Strength
Unknown	1,500

Casualties and losses
Unknown	Unknown

The siege of Bristol lasted from the 18th to 26 October 1326, and saw the city besieged by the forces of Isabella of France and Roger Mortimer during the 1326 Invasion of England. Isabella and Mortimer's forces fought the garrison under Hugh Despenser the Elder for eight days in a siege. They captured the fort after several attacks.

== Siege of Bristol ==
Hugh Despenser the Elder was expecting an attack by the rebels. He ordered his walls to be double-positioned with archers, and for the civilians to relocate inside of the castle. Isabella's troops were prepared to march. Isabella personally marched to the castle and began to attack it on 18 October. Her troops were mowed down by longbow, but she continued to charge. Despenser's garrison held out against several more assaults. Again, Isabella continued her attacks. Her forces used battering rams to break down the gates, and Isabella rescued her daughters, Eleanor of Woodstock and Joan of the Tower from Despenser's custody. After one final attack, Despenser was forced to surrender, and he was hanged the next day. Isabella's men had taken the greatest city in western England.

== Aftermath ==
Isabella established her base at Hereford near the Welsh Border on 1 November. Her campaign was a success, and it ended the civil war. Hugh Despenser the younger and Edmund Fitzalan were captured. Fitzalan was executed on November 17 by hanging, and Despenser was hanged on 24 November. With the end of the war, Edward II was deposed in parliament, imprisoned, and later died—probably murdered—in Berkeley Castle.

== Sources ==
- Valente, C. (1998). "The Deposition and Abdication of Edward II". The English Historical Review. 113 (453): 852–881. doi:10.1093/ehr/CXIII.453.852. OCLC 2207424.
