= John of Eltham =

English prince and nobleman (1316–1336)

- Earl of Cornwall
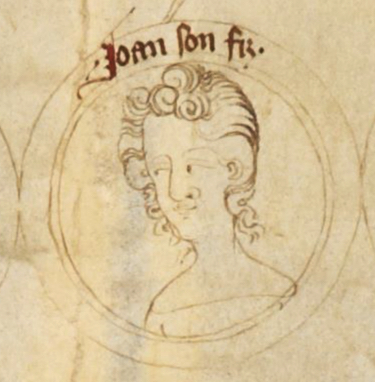
- John on the family tree of English kings
- Born: 15 August 1316; Eltham Palace, Kent
- Died: 13 September 1336 (aged 20); Perth, Scotland
- Burial: 15 January 1337; Westminster Abbey, London
- Father: Edward II of England
- Mother: Isabella of France

John of Eltham, 1st Earl of Cornwall (15 August 1316 – 13 September 1336) was the second son of Edward II of England and Isabella of France. He was heir presumptive to the English throne until the birth of his nephew Edward the Black Prince.

== Life ==
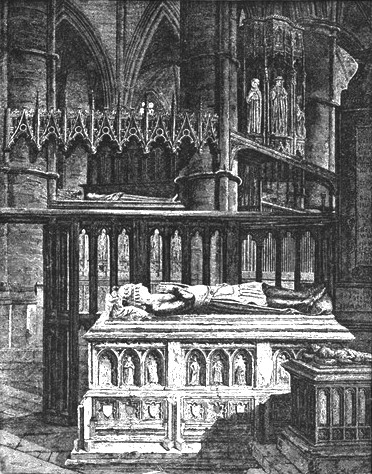
Alabaster-carved tomb of John of Eltham at Westminster Abbey

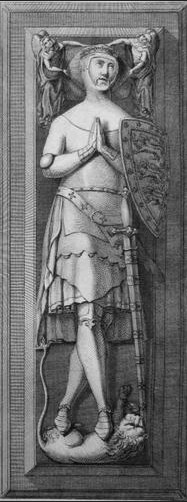
John of Eltham's effigy at Westminster Abbey

John was born in 1316 at Eltham Palace, Kent, the second son of Edward II of England and Isabella of France. On 6 October 1328, at the age of twelve, he was created Earl of Cornwall. Caught in the throes of the war between his father, Edward II, and his mother, Isabella, his growing years were turbulent. He was passed between his parents and was even held in the Tower of London for a time before his brother, Edward III, led a coup against their mother and assumed his majority.

Information on John is scant, but by most historical accounts he was highly competent, and highly trusted by Edward. He was named "Guardian of the Realm" when Edward III was out of the country, was asked to open Parliament in Edward's absence, and was named Warden of the northern Marches, which gave him virtual autonomy in that portion of England.

As the younger brother of the English monarch, since early childhood marital negotiations were made for John: in March 1328 Edward III entered into negotiations for a marriage between his brother and María Díaz de Haro, heiress of the Lordship of Biscay. (Note: King Edward III wrote to "Alfonso...Castellæ...regi" and to "Marie dame de Biscay" regarding the proposed marriage between "fratrem nostrum germanum Johannem de Eltham" and "filiam dompni Johannis quondam domini de Biskae" dated 28 March 1328.) By contract signed on 28 September 1334, John was then betrothed with Maria de La Cerda, Lady of Lunel and daughter of Ferdinand de la Cerda (grandson of King Alfonso X of Castile) by his wife Juana Núñez de Lara, Lady of Lara. A dispensation was sought, but the contract was abandoned when relations between Edward III and King Philip VI of France worsened in late 1334. Marie married Charles d'Évreux at Poissy in April 1335. In December 1335 were made negotiations for a marriage with Joan, Countess of Penthièvre and heiress of the Duchy of Brittany; (Note: Edward III appointed "Willielmi d´Aubeneye militis et Joannis Caupegorge" as proxies to negotiate the marriage between "Joannem comitem Cornubiæ fratrem nostrum" and "Johannam filiam Guidonis de Britannia neptem et hæredem [Johanne Duce Britanniæ consanguineo nostro]" by charter dated 31 December 1335.) however, it does not seem that these arrangement resulted in an official betrothal.

At sixteen he was a key commander in the Battle of Halidon Hill (1333), a devastating defeat for the Scots. Later he commanded an army in the southwest of Scotland that put down resistance to Edward Balliol, whose claims to the Scottish throne were supported by England. According to Scottish accounts, who view John as a ruthless destroyer, he burned down Lesmahagow Abbey when it was filled with people who had sought sanctuary from the wrath of the English troops. As the Scottish chronicler John of Fordun tells it, this violation of the sacred laws of sanctuary so enraged King Edward III that he killed his own brother in fury. According to modern historian Tom Beaumont James, this tale "challenges the distinction between history and story."

John died at Perth, probably from a fever, shortly after turning 20. In January 1337, Edward buried his brother with all honours in a beautiful alabaster-carved tomb in Westminster Abbey, and had over 900 masses said for his soul.

== Ancestry ==
Ancestors of John of Eltham

8. Henry III of England
4. Edward I of England
9. Eleanor of Provence
2. Edward II of England
10. Ferdinand III of Castile
5. Eleanor of Castile
11. Joan of Ponthieu
1. John of Eltham
12. Philip III of France
6. Philip IV of France
13. Isabella of Aragon
3. Isabella of France
14. Henry I of Navarre
7. Joan I of Navarre
15. Blanche of Artois

== Arms ==
Arms of John, Earl of Cornwall

As Earl of Cornwall, John had use of the coat of arms of the kingdom, differenced by a bordure France (i.e. azure semy of fleur-de-lys or).

== Sources ==
- Baker, Geoffrey (2012). Barber, Richard (ed.). The Chronicle of Geoffrey Le Baker of Swinbrook. Translated by Preest, David. The Boydell Press.
- Dryburgh, Paul (2016). "Living in the Shadows: John of Eltham, Earl of Cornwll (1316-36)". In Bothwell, James; Dodd, Gwilym (eds.). Fourteenth Century England. Vol. 14. The Boydell Press.24
