= Contrariants =

Aristocratic faction in England in the early 14th century

The Contrariants (from Latin contrariantes, "those who oppose") were an aristocratic faction in England in the early 14th century. They favoured the policies of the Lords Ordainers (1311) and opposed the Despensers, Hugh the Elder and Hugh the Younger. They were most prominent in the Welsh Marches and northern England.

During the civil war of 1321–22, they fought against the Despensers and King Edward II. In war, however, they displayed marked disunity. Defeated, many were executed or else had their lands confiscated. Among those executed for treason were Thomas, 2nd Earl of Lancaster; Humphrey de Bohun, 4th Earl of Hereford; and Bartholomew Badlesmere.

One of the Contrariant leaders who escaped to France, Roger Mortimer, led an invasion of England in 1326, overthrowing Edward and executing the Despensers.
