= Invasion of England (1326) =

Military campaign of 1326

Isabella and Mortimer's campaign
- Isabella's Campaign (green) and the Royalist retreat (red)
Date	24 September – 16 November 1326
Location	England and Wales
Result	Contrariants' victory

Belligerents
Royalists	Contrariants; Supported by: County of Hainaut

Commanders and leaders
Edward II (POW); Hugh Despenser the Younger (executed); Hugh Despenser the Elder (executed); Earl of Arundel (executed)	Isabella of France; Roger Mortimer; Earl of Leicester; Earl of Norfolk; Earl of Kent; John of Beaumont

Strength
Unknown	1,500 (invasion)

Casualties and losses
Unknown	Unknown

The invasion of England in 1326 by the country's queen, Isabella of France, and her lover, Roger Mortimer, led to the capture and executions of Hugh Despenser the Younger and Hugh Despenser the Elder and the abdication of Isabella's husband, King Edward II. It brought an end to the insurrection and civil war.

== Background ==
Roger Mortimer of Wigmore was a powerful Marcher lord, married to the wealthy heiress Joan de Geneville, and the father of twelve children. Mortimer had been imprisoned in the Tower of London in 1322 following his capture by Edward II. Mortimer's uncle Roger Mortimer de Chirk died in prison, but Mortimer himself managed to escape the Tower in 1323, making a hole in the stone wall of his cell before escaping onto the roof and using rope ladders provided by an accomplice to get down to the River Thames, across the river and then on eventually to safety in France. Victorian writers suggested that, given later events, Isabella might have helped Mortimer escape; some historians continue to argue that their relationship had already begun at this point, although most believe that there is no hard evidence for their having had a substantial relationship before meeting in Paris. (Note: Ian Mortimer offers an alternative perspective.)

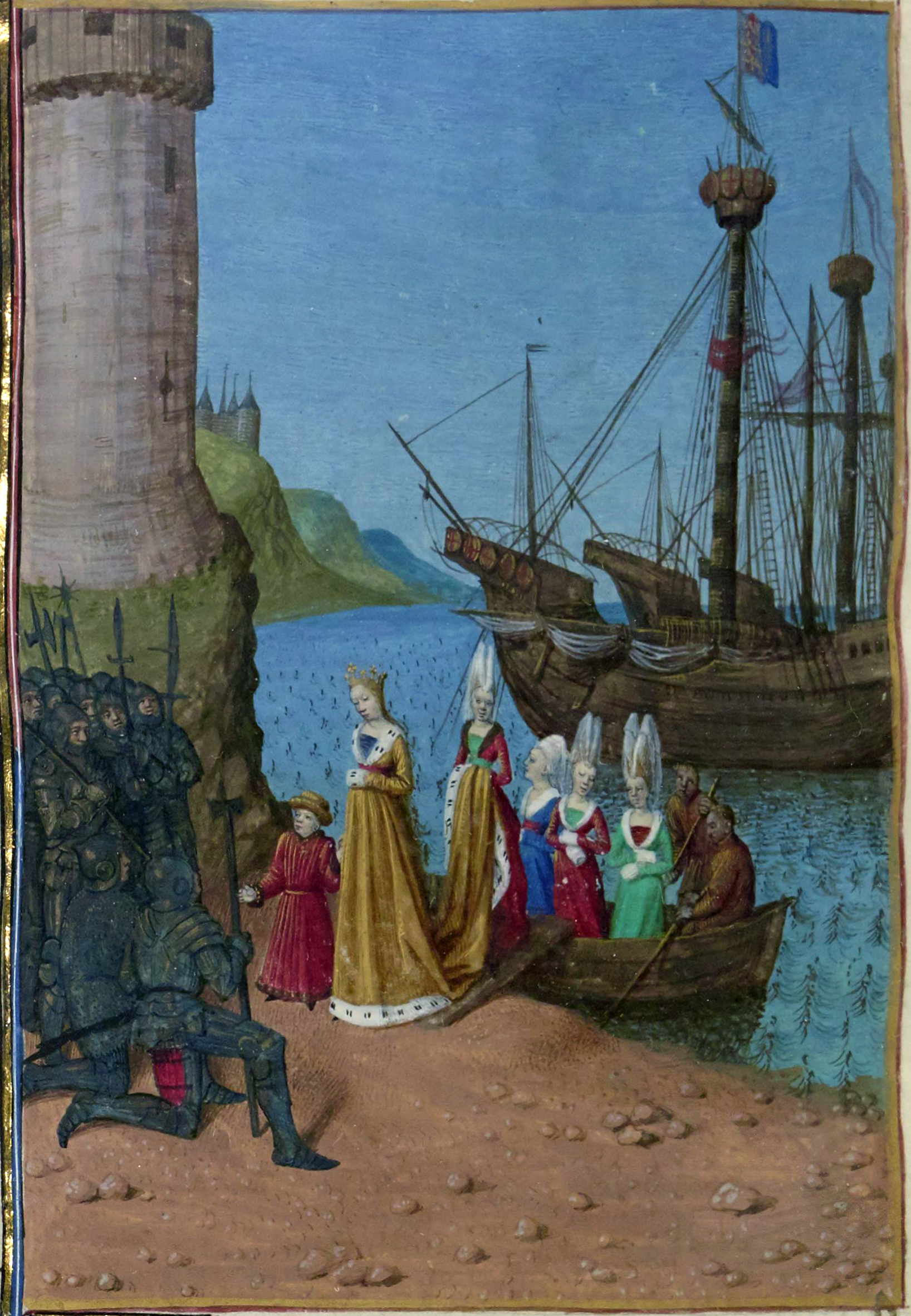
Isabella of France landing in England with her son, the future Edward III of England

In 1325 Edward, then Duke of Aquitaine and heir to the throne of England, journeyed to France to pay homage to Charles IV of France as his vassal. Isabella accompanied her son and it was during that journey that her affair with Mortimer began. Isabella was reintroduced to Mortimer in Paris by her cousin, Joan, Countess of Hainault, who appears to have approached Isabella suggesting a marital alliance between their two families, marrying Prince Edward to Joan's daughter, Philippa. Mortimer and Isabella began a passionate relationship from December 1325 onwards. Isabella was taking a huge risk in doing so: female infidelity was a very serious offence in medieval Europe, as shown during the Tour de Nesle Affair, as a result of which both Isabella's former French sisters-in-law had died by 1326, having been imprisoned for exactly this offence. Isabella's motivation has been the subject of discussion by historians; most agree that there was a strong sexual attraction between the two, that they shared an interest in the Arthurian legends and that they both enjoyed fine art and high living. One historian has described their relationship as one of the "great romances of the Middle Ages". They also shared a common enemy—the regime of Edward II and the Despensers.

Isabella was ordered to return to England after homage was paid to Charles, but refused to do so in January 1326 unless Hugh Despenser was exiled. Edward refused this, and then ordered Charles to make her return; he refused in turn, and in return Edward cut off all financial supplies to Isabella. Isabella turned to Charles for aid but he demurred, only allowing her an occupancy in his palace. This, however, did not last long when word arrived that Pope John XXII had spoken out against Isabella; Charles swiftly ordered her away, and would not speak to her again for a long time. Mortimer's supporters in England started to send him victuals, armour and other aid by March 1326, which Edward tried to stop, and also ordered his ports to be on the lookout for spies entering the kingdom. The authority of the Despenser regime suffered an increasing amount of rebellious acts including the audacious killing of the Baron of the Exchequer, Roger de Beler by Eustace Folville, Roger la Zouch and their gang.

Without French support, Isabella and Mortimer left Paris in the summer of 1326, taking Prince Edward with them, and travelled north-east into Holy Roman Empire territory to William I, Count of Hainaut. As Joan had suggested the previous year, Isabella betrothed Prince Edward to Philippa, the daughter of the Count, in exchange for a substantial dowry She then used this money to raise a mercenary army, scouring Brabant for men, which were added to a small force of Hainaut troops. William also provided eight men-of-war ships and various smaller vessels as part of the marriage arrangements. Although Edward now feared an invasion, secrecy remained key, and Isabella convinced William to detain envoys from Edward. Isabella also appears to have made a secret agreement with the Scots for the duration of the forthcoming campaign.

== Invasion ==
After a short period of confusion during which they attempted to work out where they had landed, Isabella moved quickly inland, dressed in her widow's clothes. A number of her key supporters immediately joined her, perhaps having been forewarned of her arrival, including the bishops of Lincoln and Hereford. Local levies, mobilised to stop them, immediately changed sides, and victims of the Despensers and relatives of Contrariants flocked to their cause. By the following day Isabella was in Bury St Edmunds and shortly afterwards had swept inland to Cambridge. Thomas, Earl of Norfolk, joined Isabella's forces and Henry, Earl of Leicester—the brother of the late Thomas, Earl of Lancaster, and Isabella's uncle—also announced he was joining Isabella's faction, marching south to join her. On 26 September, Isabella entered Cambridge.

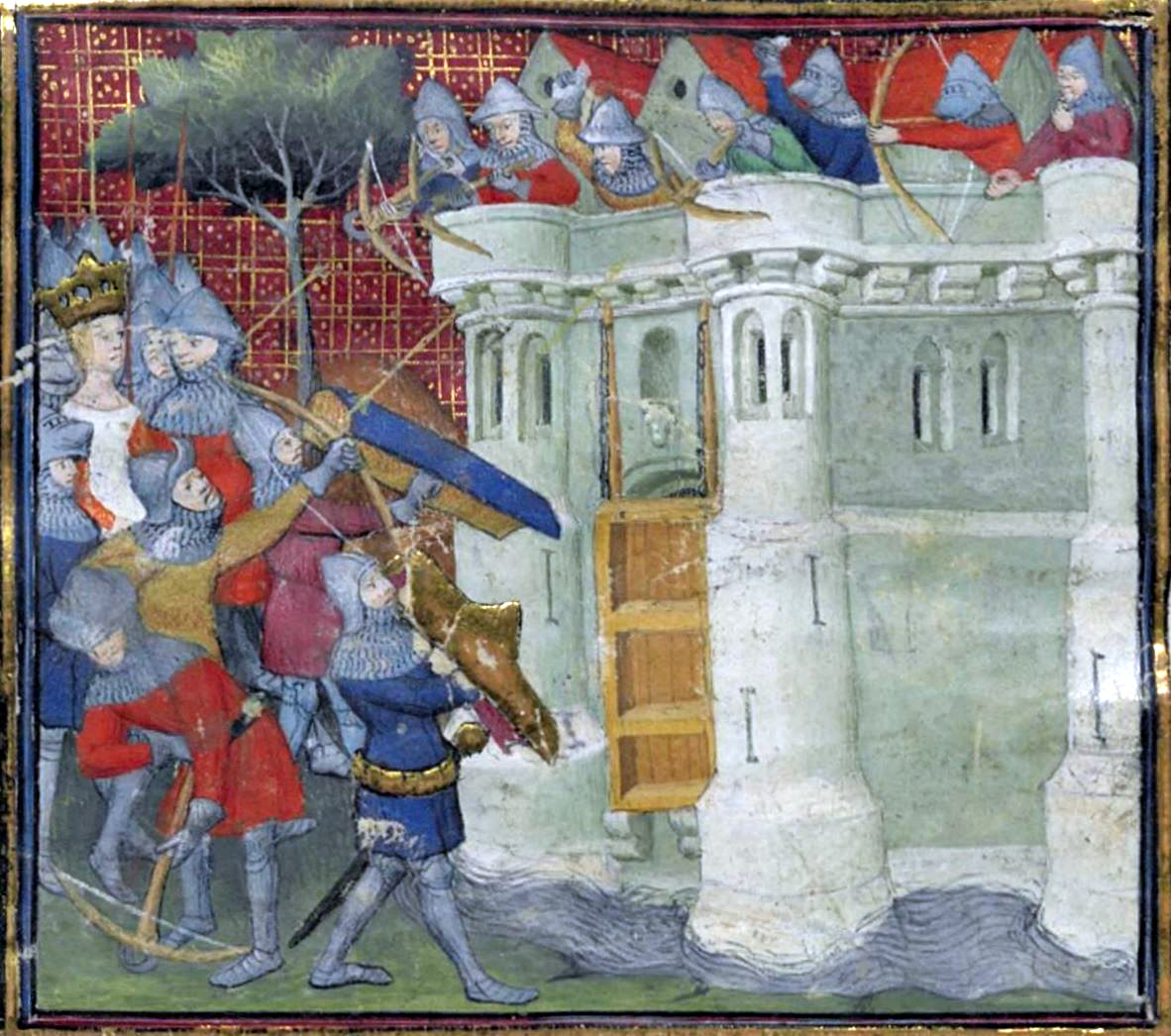
Isabella oversees the Siege of Bristol

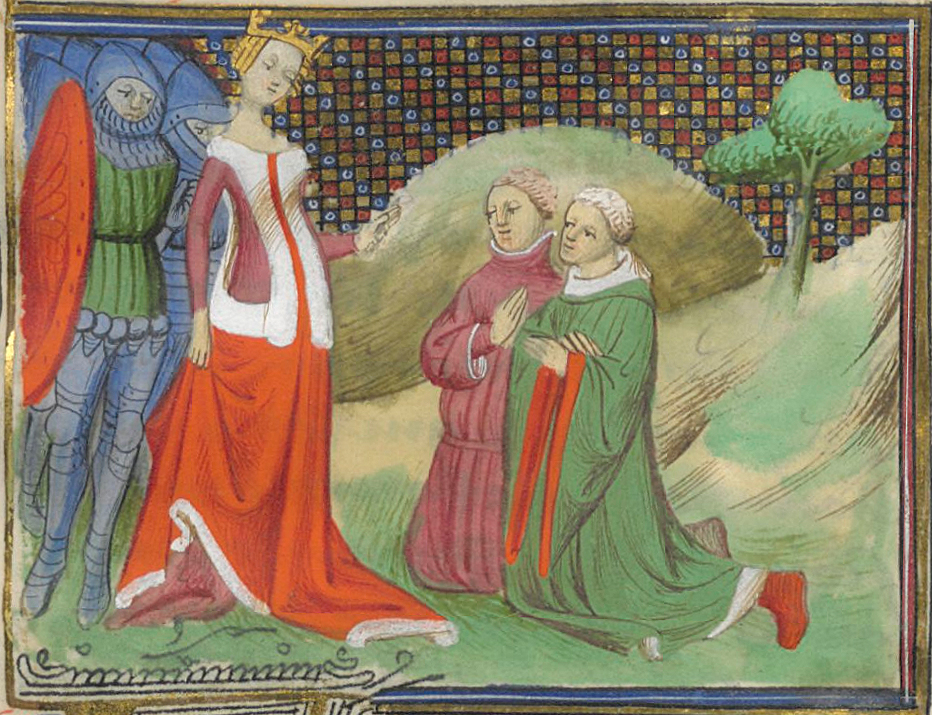
Hugh Despenser the Younger and Edmund Fitzalan brought before Isabella for trial in 1326; the pair were gruesomely executed

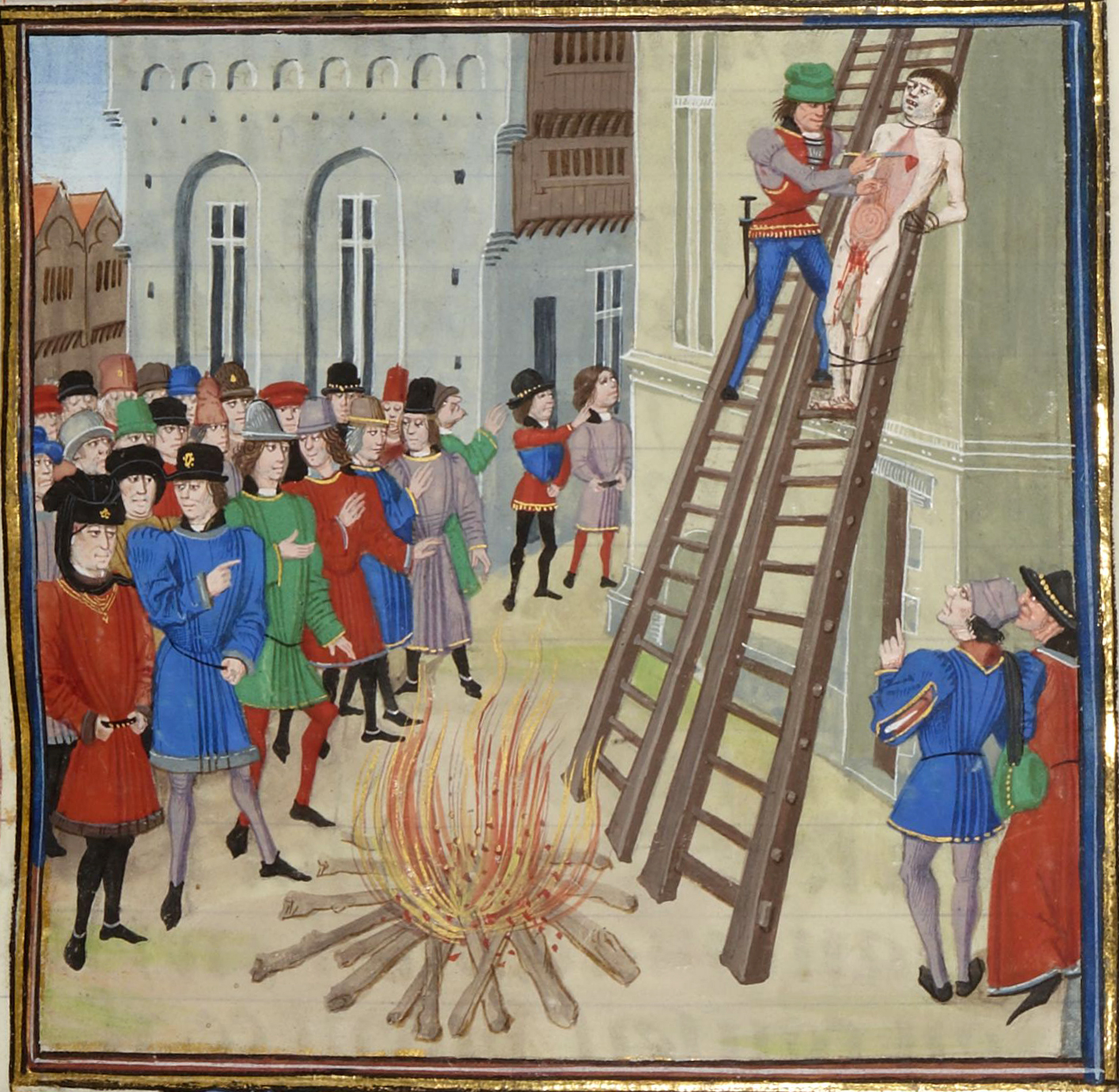
Despenser's death

By 27 September, word of the invasion had reached the King and the Despensers in London. Edward issued orders to local sheriffs, including Richard de Perrers the High Sheriff of Essex, to mobilise opposition to Isabella and Mortimer, but with little confidence that they would be acted upon as he suspected that Perrers detested the Despensers. London itself was becoming unsafe due to local unrest and Edward made plans to leave. Isabella struck west again, reaching Oxford on 2 October. Adam Orleton, the bishop of Hereford, denounced the Despensers from the pulpit. Edward fled London on the same day, heading west toward Wales. Isabella and Mortimer now had an effective alliance with the Lancastrian opposition to Edward, bringing all of his opponents into a single coalition.

Isabella now marched south towards London, pausing at Dunstable on 7 October. London was now in the hands of the mobs, although broadly allied to Isabella. Bishop Walter de Stapledon failed to realise the extent to which royal power had collapsed in the capital and tried to intervene militarily to protect his property against rioters; a hated figure locally, he was promptly attacked and killed, his head being later sent to Isabella by her local supporters. Edward, meanwhile, was still fleeing west, reaching Gloucester by the 9th. Isabella responded by marching swiftly west herself in an attempt to cut him off, reaching Gloucester a week after Edward, who slipped across the border into Wales the same day. Isabella was joined by the northern baronage led by Thomas Wake, Henry de Beaumont and Henry Percy which now gave her total military superiority.

Hugh Despenser the Elder continued to hold Bristol against Isabella and Mortimer, who placed it under siege from 18 October until 26 October when it fell. Isabella was able to recover her daughters Eleanor of Woodstock and Joan of the Tower, who had been kept in the Despenser's custody. By now desperate and increasingly deserted by their court, Edward and Hugh Despenser the Younger attempted to sail to Lundy, a small island just off the Devon coast, but the weather was against them and after several days they were forced to land back in Wales.

With Bristol secure, Isabella moved her base of operations up to the border town of Hereford, from where she ordered Henry of Lancaster to locate and arrest her husband. After a fortnight of evading Isabella's forces in South Wales, Edward and Hugh were finally caught and arrested near Llantrisant on 16 November, which brought an end to the insurrection and the civil war.

== Aftermath ==
Edward II died, most likely assassinated by orders of Isabella and Mortimer. Hugh Despenser the Younger and Edmund Fitzalan were both hanged, drawn, and quartered. The deaths of Fitzalan, Despenser the Younger, Despenser the Elder and Edward II brought an end to the civil war, saw the start of a year of looting of the Despensers' estates and the issuing of pardons to thousands of people falsely indicted by them.

On 31 March 1327, under Isabella's instruction, Edward III agreed a peace treaty with Charles IV of France: Aquitaine would be returned to Edward, with Charles receiving 50,000 livres, the territories of Limousin, Quercy, the Agenais and Périgord, and the Bazas country, leaving the young Edward with a much reduced territory.

== Bibliography ==
- Fryde, Natalie (1979). The Tyranny and Fall of Edward II 1321-1326. Cambridge: Cambridge University Press. ISBN 978-0-521-22201-3.
- Haines, Roy Martin (2003). King Edward II: His Life, His Reign, and Its Aftermath, 1284-1330. McGill-Queen's Press – MQUP. ISBN 9780773570566.
- Lehman, Eugene (2011). Lives of England's Reigning and Consort Queen. Author House. ISBN 9781463430559.
- Lumley, Joseph (1895). Chronicon Henry Knighton. Vol. I. London: HMSO.
- Mortimer, Ian (2008). The Perfect King: The Life of Edward III, Father of the English Nation. London: Vintage Books. ISBN 978-0-09-952709-1.
- Neillands, Robin (2001). The Hundred Years War History. Routledge. ISBN 9780415261302.
- Ormrod, W. Mark (2000). "England: Edward II and Edward III". In Jones, Michael (ed.). The New Cambridge Medieval History. Vol. VI. Cambridge University Press.
- Close Rolls. Westminster: Parliament of England. 1224–1468.
- Patent Rolls. Westminster: Parliament of England. 1232–1509.
- Prestwich, Michael (2003). The Three Edwards: War and State in England, 1272–1377. Psychology Press. ISBN 9780415303095.
- Weir, Alison (2006). Queen Isabella: She-Wolf of France, Queen of England. London: Pimlico Books. ISBN 978-0-7126-4194-4.
