= Hugh Despenser the Elder =

Former Earl of Winchester (1261–1326)

Hugh le Despenser
- Earl of Winchester
- Arms of Despenser: Quarterly 1st & 4th: Argent; 2nd & 3rd: Gules, a fret or, over all a bend sable
- Predecessor: none
- Successor: Lewis de Bruges
- Other names: The Elder Despenser
- Born: 1 March 1261
- Died: 27 October 1326 (aged 65); Bristol, Gloucestershire
- Wars and battles: Despenser War; Isabella's Campaign; Siege of Bristol †
- Offices: Lord Warden of the Cinque Ports
- Spouse: Isabella de Beauchamp
- Issue: Aline le Despenser; Hugh le Despenser the Younger; Isabella le Despenser; Philip le Despenser; Margaret le Despenser; Elizabeth le Despenser
- Father: Hugh le Despenser, Baron le Despenser
- Mother: Aline Basset

Hugh le Despenser (1 March 1261 – 27 October 1326), sometimes referred to as "the Elder Despenser", was for a time the chief adviser to King Edward II of England. He was created a baron in 1295 and Earl of Winchester in 1322. One day after being captured by forces loyal to Sir Roger Mortimer and Edward's wife, Queen Isabella, who were leading a rebellion against Edward, he was hanged and then beheaded.

== Ancestry ==
Despenser was the son of Hugh le Despenser (1223–1265, briefly Justiciar of England) and Aline Basset, only daughter and heiress of Philip Basset. His father was killed at the Battle of Evesham when Hugh was a boy, but Hugh's patrimony was saved through the influence of his maternal grandfather, who had been loyal to the king.

== Life ==
Despenser served Edward I on numerous occasions both in battle and as a diplomat, and was created a baron by writ of summons to Parliament in 1295. His son, Hugh Despenser the Younger, became a favourite of Edward II, in what was rumoured to be a homosexual relationship. Hugh the Elder was loyal to his son and the King, which worried the barons. Until that time, the highest office he had held was justice of the forests.

He was one of the few barons to remain loyal to Edward during the controversy regarding Piers Gaveston. Despenser became Edward's loyal servant and chief administrator after Gaveston was executed in 1312, but the jealousy of other barons—and, more importantly, his own corruption and unjust behaviour—led to his being exiled along with his son in 1321, when Edmund of Woodstock, Earl of Kent replaced him as Lord Warden of the Cinque Ports.

Edward found it difficult to manage without them, and recalled them to England a year later, an action which enraged Queen Isabella, the more so when Despenser was created Earl of Winchester in 1322. Although his reputation was not as unsavoury as his son's, Despenser the Elder was accused by a significant number of people of widespread criminality during the next few years, often involving false accusations of trespass or theft and the extortion of money or land.

== Death ==
When Isabella, Queen of England, and Sir Roger Mortimer led a rebellion against her husband Edward, they captured both Despensers—first the elder, later the younger. Following Hugh the Elder's capture at the Siege of Bristol, Isabella interceded for him, but his enemies, notably Mortimer and Henry, Earl of Lancaster, insisted that both father and son should face trial and execution.

One day after being captured, the elder Despenser was hanged in his armour at Bristol on 27 October 1326. He was then beheaded, after which his body was cut into pieces and fed to dogs. His head was sent to be displayed in Winchester, which had supported the king. Despenser's Winchester title was forfeit, not to be revived until 1472. The younger Despenser was hanged, drawn and quartered at Hereford the following month.

After Despenser's death, pardons were issued to thousands of people whom he had falsely accused.

== Marriage and issue ==
He married Isabel de Beauchamp, a daughter of William de Beauchamp, 9th Earl of Warwick (c. 1238–1298) by his wife Maud FitzJohn, and widow of Sir Patrick de Chaurces. By his wife he had two sons and several daughters, including:

- Hugh Despenser the Younger;
- Philip le Despenser (grandfather of Philip le Despenser, 1st Baron le Despenser);
- Isabel le Despenser, second wife of John Hastings, 1st Baron Hastings and second wife of Ralph de Monthermer, 1st Baron Monthermer;
- Margaret le Despenser, wife of John de St Amand, 1st Baron Amand (1283/6–1330).

== Notes ==
Legal offices
| Preceded by The Lord Strange | Justice in Eyre south of the Trent; 1296–1307 | Succeeded by Pain Tiptoft |
| Preceded by The Lord Tibetot | Justice in Eyre south of the Trent; 1307–1311 | Succeeded by Robert fitz Pain |
| Preceded by Robert fitz Pain | Justice in Eyre south of the Trent; 1312–1314 | Succeeded by The Lord Monthermer |
| Preceded by The Earl of Pembroke | Justice in Eyre south of the Trent; 1324–1326 | Succeeded by The Lord Wake of Liddell |
Political offices
| Preceded by The Lord Badlesmere | Lord Wardens of the Cinque Ports; 1320 | Succeeded by The Earl of Kent |
Peerage of England
| Preceded by Hugh le Despencer | Baron le Despencer; 1265–1326 | Forfeit |
