= Edward's abdication =

Edward's abdication may refer to the following events:

- Parliament of 1327, which transferred the English Crown from Edward II to his son, Edward III
- Abdication of Edward VIII in 1936
