= Magnum Concilium =

Mediaeval institution of English government

In the Kingdom of England, the Magnum Concilium (Latin for "Great Council") was an assembly historically convened at certain times of the year when the English nobles and church leaders outside the Curia regis were summoned to discuss the affairs of the country with the king. In the 13th century, the Great Council was superseded by the Parliament of England, which had developed out of the Council. The Great Council was last summoned by Charles I in 1640.

== Anglo-Saxon assemblies ==
The Magnum Concilium (Latin for "Great Council") originated in the 10th century, when several small Anglo-Saxon kingdoms formed a unified Kingdom of England. In Anglo-Saxon England, the king held deliberative assemblies of nobles and prelates, called witans. These assemblies comprised between twenty-five and hundreds of participants, including bishops, abbots, ealdormen, and thegns. Witans met regularly during the three feasts of Christmas, Easter and Whitsun and at other times. Previously, kings interacted with their nobility through royal itineration, but the new kingdom's size made that impractical. Having nobles come to the king for witans was an important alternative to maintain control of the realm.

Witans served several functions. They appear to have had a role in electing kings, especially in times when the succession was disputed. They were theatrical displays of kingship in that they coincided with crown-wearings. They were also forums for receiving petitions and building consensus among the magnates. King's dispensed patronage, such as granting bookland, and these were recorded in charters witnessed and consented to by those in attendance.

Appointments to offices, such as to bishoprics or ealdormanries, were made during witans. Important political decisions were made in consultation with witans, such as going to war and making treaties. Witans helped the king to produce Anglo-Saxon law codes and acted as a court for important cases, such as those involving the king or important magnates.

== Norman England ==
After the Norman Conquest of 1066, William the Conqueror (r. 1066–1087) continued the tradition of summoning assemblies of magnates to consider national affairs, conduct state trials, and make laws; although legislation now took the form of writs rather than law codes. These assemblies were called magna concilia. While kings had access to familiar counsel, this private advice could not replace the need for consensus building, and overreliance on familiar counsel could lead to political instability. Great councils were valued because they "carried fewer political risks, allowed responsibility to be more broadly shared, and drew a larger body of prelates and magnates into the making of decisions".

The council's members were the king's tenants-in-chief. The greater tenants, such as archbishops, bishops, abbots, earls, and barons were summoned by individual writ, but sometimes lesser tenants (Note: These were small landholders, perhaps owning no more than one or two manors, and were often described as knights in the sources.) were also summoned by sheriffs. Politics in the period following the Conquest (1066–1154) was dominated by about 200 wealthy laymen, in addition to the king and leading clergy. High-ranking churchmen, such as bishops and abbots, were important magnates in their own right. According to Domesday Book, the English church owned between 25% and 33% of all land in 1066.

== Plantagenet England ==
Traditionally, the great council was not involved in levying taxes. Royal finances derived from land revenues, feudal aids and incidents, and the profits of royal justice. This changed near the end of Henry II's reign (1154–1189) due to the need to finance the Third Crusade, the ransom of Richard I, and pay for the series of Anglo-French wars fought between the Plantagenet and Capetian dynasties. In 1188, Henry II gained the council's consent to levy the Saladin tithe. The precedent of gaining the magnates' consent in council for taxation was followed thereafter. In the process, the council assumed a more representative role, since they were in effect consenting on behalf of the kingdom's taxpayers. At the same time, these financial pressures created new political tensions between the baronage and the Crown.

King John (r. 1199–1216) alienated the barons by showing partiality when dispensing justice, heavy financial demands and abusing his right to feudal incidents and aids. In 1215, the barons forced John to abide by a charter of liberties similar to charters issued by earlier kings (see Charter of Liberties). Known as Magna Carta (Latin for "Great Charter"), the document was based on three assumptions important to the later development of Parliament:

1. the king was subject to the law
2. the king could only make law and raise taxation (except customary feudal dues) with the consent of the "community of the realm"
3. that the obedience owed by subjects to the king was conditional and not absolute

While the clause stipulating no taxation "without the common counsel" was deleted from later reissues, it was nevertheless followed. Magna Carta transformed the feudal obligation to advise the king into a right to consent. The liberties guaranteed in the charter were granted to "all the free men of our realm", but it was the barons in council who would represent them.

During the reign of John's son, Henry III (r. 1216–1272), meetings of the great council began to be called parliament, from the French parlement, first used in the late 11th century, with the meaning of parley or conversation. The Parliament of England continued to develop in the reign of Henry's son Edward I (r. 1272–1307).

== Tudor and Stuart eras ==
According to The Oxford History of England, Henry VII summoned the Magnum Concilium half a dozen times in the last years of the fifteenth century, but thereafter it fell into disuse.

In the autumn of 1640, Charles I summoned the first Magnum Concilium in generations, having dissolved the Short Parliament and suffered defeats in the Bishops' Wars against Scotland. The Concilium offered Charles a guaranteed loan of £200,000 sterling to pay the army and attempted unsuccessfully to negotiate with the Scots. It declined to resume its ancient governing role, and urged Charles instead to summon a new Parliament, which then became a protagonist in the English Civil War. Following the Stuart Restoration, the revived monarchy did not recreate the Magnum Concilium. Since then, the Concilium has not met.

== Proposed revival ==
In 2008, Christopher Russell Bailey, 5th Baron Glanusk, suggested that the time had come for a recall of the Magnum Concilium, since hereditary peers had lost their right to sit in the House of Lords under the House of Lords Act 1999.

== Notes ==
Preceded by Witan	Magnum Concilium; 1066–c.1215	Succeeded by Parliament of England c. 1215–1707
