= Curia regis =

Latin term meaning "royal council" or "king's court"

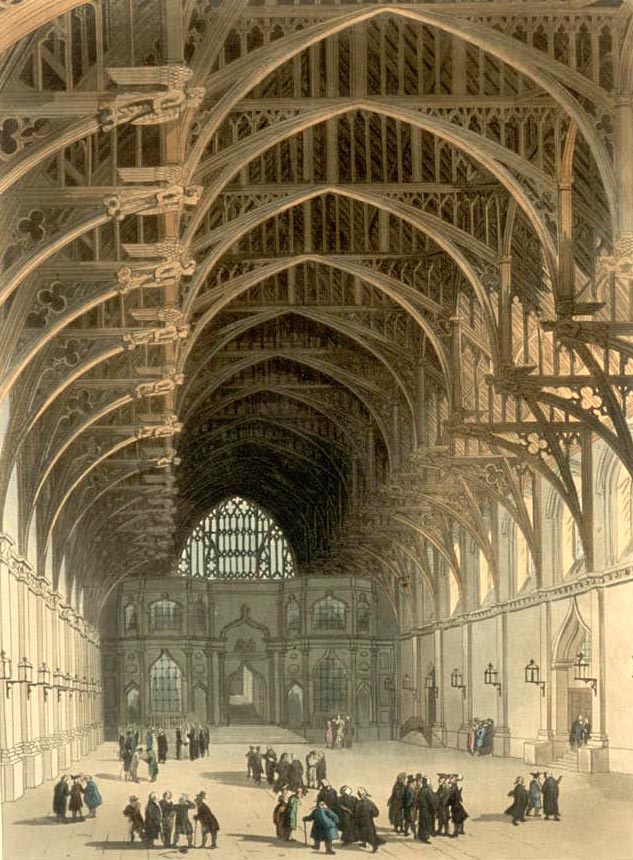
Westminster Hall in the Palace of Westminster, London.

The curia regis ([ˈkuː.ri.a ˈreː.gis]), Latin for "the royal council" or "king's court", was any of various councils of advisers and administrators in medieval Europe who served kings, including kings of France, Norman kings of England and Sicily, kings of Poland and the kings of Scotland and Norman Lords of Ireland.

== England ==
The curia regis 'royal court' or curia domini regis 'court of the Lord King' was the council that advised English monarchs following the Norman Conquest of 1066. In the Anglo-Saxon period, this advisory role was filled by the witan 'wise men'. Other contemporary Latin names for the curia regis include placitum generale 'general plea' and generalis conventus 'general convention'. It was similar to, though not identical with, the curia ducis, which served the Dukes of Normandy.

The curia performed several overlapping roles, serving simultaneously as an advisory body, an executive arm of government, a legislature, and a court of law. As historian George Burton Adams wrote, "In a single session of the court, advice might be given to the king on some question of foreign policy, and on the making and revising of a law; and a suit between two of the king's vassals might be heard and decided".

The ordinary or small curia met constantly and travelled with the king from place to place—government by itineration being the norm. Alongside royal household officials, the small curia also included those earls and feudal barons who were part of the king's retinue.

The earliest specialised departments branched from the small curia. They gradually "went out of court" by establishing permanent headquarters rather than travelling with the monarch. For example, the Exchequer was based in London by the reign of Henry II (1154–1189), and the chancellor's department, the chancery, went out of court in the 13th century. It was also during the 13th century that the small curia evolved into the Privy Council of England. In his history of Parliament, Ronald Butt identified the small curia as "the very distant ancestor of the modern executive, the Cabinet acting for the authority of the crown."

When a king required advice from a larger segment of the aristocracy, he enlarged the curia by gathering a magnum concilium 'great council'. These assemblies were attended by the king's tenants-in-chief. The greater tenants—bishops, abbots, earls, and feudal barons—were summoned by individual writ, while lesser tenants were summoned collectively by sheriffs. Despite spending much of their time in France, Norman and Angevin kings held regular councils whenever they were in England, particularly at Easter, Whitsun, and Christmas.

During the 13th century, the magnum concilium evolved into the Parliament of England.

Preceded by Witenagemot	Curia regis 1066–c.1215	Succeeded by Parliament of England and Privy Council of England

=== Ireland ===
Much of Ireland was conquered by the Anglo-Norman kings of England in the late 12th century, and the King was made Lord of Ireland. In 1171, Henry II held a curia regis in Waterford, declaring that English law would run in his Irish domains, an aspiration that was not fully realised.

In Ireland, the Court of the Justiciar in Ireland corresponded with the curia regis in England; the Chief Justiciar presided over it as the king's representative. The Irish curia regis evolved into the Privy Council of Ireland.

== France ==
In France the King's Court, called the Curia Regis in Latin, functioned as an advisory body under the early Capetian kings. It was composed of a number of the king's trusted advisers but only a few travelled with the king at any time. By the later twelfth century it had become a judicial body with a few branching off to remain the king's council.

By the fourteenth century the term curia regis was no longer used. However, it was a predecessor to later sovereign assemblies: the Parlement, which was a judiciary body, the Chamber of Accounts, which was a financial body, and the King's Council.

== Poland ==
The Royal Council of Poland in early medieval times was composed exclusively by King's will. Over time, in addition to King's appointments, certain higher dignitaries were assumed to belong to the Council owing to their functions. The following dignitaries were permanent members of the Council in the Crown of the Kingdom of Poland:

- Great Chancellor of the Crown
- Vice-Chancellors of the Crown
- Great Marshal of the Crown
- Great Treasurer of the Crown
- Land dignitaries
- Certain ecclesiastical dignitaries

By the end of the 15th century the Royal Council was transformed into the Senate of Poland.

== Spain (Castile) ==
The earliest form of the Royal Council in Spain was created in 1385 by John I of Castile after the disaster at the Battle of Aljubarrota in 1385. It was reestablished under Queen Isabella I in 1480 as the chief body dealing with administrative and judicial matters of the realm. The Council was dissolved in 1834 by Isabel II.

== See also ==
- Court of King's Bench (England)
