= Annales Paulini =

English medieval chronicle

The Annales Paulini is an English medieval chronicle. The Chronicles of St Paul's, as the Annales Paulini might be translated, is thought to have been written by a canon of St Paul's Cathedral, London. Because it covers the period of 1307–1341 it is invaluable for the history of Edward II's reign. Adam Murimuth was a canon contemporaneously and originally from Oxford, thus intimating the author as his friend.
