= Government by itineration =

Government by itineration is a method of governing by which monarchs travel around their jurisdictions in order to check what is happening. It was a common method of government in Europe in the Middle Ages.

== Description ==
A monarch would travel around his realm, stopping on the way and staying a few days in the towns and settlements through which he passed. There, he would be informed of recent events and deal with any legal cases that needed hearing. He would also consume local produce, hosting feasts for local dignitaries.

An example of itineration is King Henry I of England's travels in 1114. According to the Anglo-Saxon Chronicle (versions E and H):

king Henry was in Windsor at Christmas, and wore his crown there... The king spent Easter at Kingsthorpe near Northampton... The king spent Whit Sunday at St. Albans. Thereafter, at midsummer, he went with his levies into Wales... Thereafter he came to Winchester... Thereafter he went oversea [sic] into Normandy.

According to Peter Heather, "itineration was the key mechanism of government in the new entities of northern and eastern Europe" in the eleventh century. However, this produced a situation where core territories were "subject to permanent, more intensive control, and peripheral ones that were liable to fall under the control of others as the power of individual dynasts waxed and waned".

England was one of the first Medieval Kingdoms to begin the process of creating a permanent center of government. Prior to the Norman Conquest in 1066, the Saxons had created a permanent treasury at Winchester around which a nucleus of government functions began to grow. The Normans continued this institution with the creation of the Exchequer by Henry I. In 1150, some years after Henry's death, the Exchequer was established at the Palace of Westminster. The tradition continues to the present day, with the office of the chancellor of the exchequer at nearby 11 Downing Street, adjacent to number 10, the office of the First Lord of the Treasury who in modern times is also the prime minister of the United Kingdom, and just a block from HM Treasury at 1 Horse Guards Road.

== Explanation ==
Communications in the Middle Ages were not good and it was difficult for a monarch to keep abreast of what was happening in their lands, so travel was essential. According to Heather, a "ruler really governed only where they regularly travelled" and for this reason, realms relied "less on bureaucratic structures for their cohesion and more on the power and charisma of individual monarchs".

One other significant reason for itineration was food. With the inability to store produce other than by salting it, it was necessary for a monarch to go to his food.

== Decline ==
The European monarchs often warred against each other. Wars were costly affairs however, and as monarchs were constantly looking for ways to increase the size and effectiveness of their armies, the costs of their armies rose exponentially. This forced the monarchs to find new and better ways of taxing the population in order to pay for the armies. This in turn required larger bureaucratic structures. As the governments expanded, it became less and less efficient to keep a mobile government. As institutions became centralized, they were settled down permanently. Eventually, it became unfeasible and unnecessary for the monarch to constantly travel through his domains. By the 16th century, most states had permanent, non-mobile governments, and most monarchs had settled down. One of the last monarchs to travel around his domains was Charles V, Holy Roman Emperor, but because his domains were so extensive, he was forced to develop more permanent systems of governing. His successor, Philip II of Spain, did not travel through his domains, instead preferring to focus his government at El Escorial in Castile.
