= Folville =

Folville is a surname. Notable people with the surname include:

- Eugénie-Emilie Juliette Folville (1870–1946), Belgian pianist and composer
- Eustace Folville (1288–1347), English outlaw and leader of the Folville gang
- John Folville (d.1310), English politician
- Richard Folville (died 1340), English outlaw and member of the Folville gang

== See also ==
- Ashby Folville, village in the Melton district of Leicestershire, south west of Melton Mowbray
- Ashby Folville Manor, late 19th century house in Neo-Tudor style in Ashby Folville
- Folleville (disambiguation)
- Fowlerville (disambiguation)
- Foville
