= Folville gang =

Criminal group in 14th-century England

- Founding location: England
- Territory: England
- Ethnicity: English
- Criminal activities: Robbery, murder

The Folville gang was an armed band of criminals and outlaws active in the English county of Leicestershire in the early 14th century, led by Eustace Folville.

== Background ==
The gang was one of many armed civilian groups to emerge from the political turmoil that ravaged England during and after the Despenser War, in the last years of Edward II's reign. The Folville family was from Ashby Folville, Leicestershire, in the English Midlands. Eustace Folville, the second of the family's seven sons, was a well-known opponent of Edward's dishonest and ineffective administration, and his younger brothers took the same stance. The gang committed a variety of depredations in the extralegal pursuit of justice, including robbery, kidnapping, and murder, frequently on behalf of others, suggesting they may have acted as mercenaries as much as serving their own motives.

== Criminal career ==
=== Slaying of Roger Beler ===
In January 1326, Eustace led a band of fifty men to a valley near Rearsby and ambushed and killed the corrupt Baron of the Exchequer Sir Roger de Beler, an ardent supporter of the Despensers who had previously made threats of violence to Eustace, his family, and his neighbours. An arrest warrant was issued on 24 January to apprehend those

- Ralph la Zouch, son of Sir Roger la Zouch of Lubbesthorpe
- Eustace Folville and his brothers Robert, Walter, and Reverend Richard Folville, Vicar of Teigh
- Adam de Barleye
- William de Barkeston of Bitham
- Roger la Zouch, another son of Sir Roger la Zouch of Lubbesthorpe
- Ivo/Eudo, son of Sir William la Zouch, 1st Baron Zouche of Harringworth (Note: The la Zouches of Harringworth were cousins of the la Zouches of Lubbesthorpe.)
- Sir Robert de Hellewell

The listing of the la Zouches of Lubbesthorpe first implies their leadership, which is backed up by an order on 24 March to the Sheriff of Leicestershire to seize the lands of Sir Roger la Zouch, Lord of Lubbesthorpe, as he had been indicted of "assenting to and counselling" the death of Roger de Beler. La Zouch no doubt had a personal grudge against Beler stemming from the arrest warrant against him in 1324 as well as Beler's desertion from the rebels' side after the Battle of Boroughbridge in 1322. The Folvilles may have been mercenaries hired by the la Zouches but Beler's previous threats probably persuaded them that his removal would be a good thing in itself.

A further warrant on 18 March added the following names to the list of the suspected perpetrators:

- Robert, son of Simon de Hauberk of Scalford
- John de Stafford and his brother William

On 14 March, a warrant was issued to Edmund de Ashby, Sheriff of Leics, to arrest Thomas Folville for helping Ralph son of Roger la Zouch of Lubbesthorpe, Eustace Folville, and others to escape from England. The fugitives fled first to Wales and then to Paris to join Queen Isabella, Roger Mortimer, and Sir William Trussell, who were conspiring to depose Isabella's husband King Edward II. There they lost one of their band, Ivo/Eudo la Zouch, perhaps from wounds received in the attack on Beler or during their subsequent flight from England. Ivo/Eudo was buried in the church of the friars of St Augustine in Paris on 27 April.

Isabella, Mortimer, and Trussell began their invasion of England by landing at Orwell, Suffolk, on 24 September 1326 with a small army of about 1500 (perhaps including the recently exiled Folville gang). They are quickly joined by a very large popular uprising of discontent with the reign of Edward and the Despensers.

On 28 September a general pardon was issued by King Edward to all outlaws provided that they helped defend against the invasion. The only people excluded from the pardon were Mortimer and the Folville gang, who Edward obviously suspected were intrinsically linked.

Opposition to the invasion proved to be almost non-existent and so many barons, sheriffs, and knights joined the rebellion that they gained control within just two months. Both Hugh le Despenser, Earl of Winchester and his son Hugh Despenser the Younger were quickly and gruesomely executed by Mortimer once captured.

A pardon for the Folvilles was rushed through and granted on 11 February 1327, presumably on the request of Roger Mortimer, now the new fourteen-year-old king's Steward, and the new Speaker of the House of Commons, Sir William Trussell, just ten days after Edward III had been crowned as the new king.

Despite the elder Roger la Zouch seeming to have been the 'brains' behind the assassination of Roger de Beler, and providing the link to William Trussell and the rebellion, Eustace Folville became more closely associated with the crime in the popular perception, as is made evident by the contemporary Leicestershire chronicler Henry Knighton recording Eustachius de Fuluyle qui Robertum Bellere interfecerat ("Eustace de Folville who assassinated Roger Bellere"). The incident is memorialized with the 'Folville Cross', a 1 m-high (3 ft 3 in) fragment of an ancient crucifix, supposedly on the site of the murder, at a crossroads 1 km northeast of Ashby Folville.

=== Outlawry ===
The fourteenth-century legal system made accommodations for practices of vigilantism and retribution. Debts were often recovered using force, disputes resolved by duels, and judges were only involved when all other attempts at resolution had failed. The Folvilles were emboldened by finding themselves 'heroes of the revolution' (at least locally, having saved their neighbours from the nefarious acts of Despenser and Beler) and continued to commit acts of retribution. As the years went by, they found themselves on both sides of the law, being repeatedly outlawed and then pardoned by sympathetic authorities.

Upon their return to Leicestershire after the revolution, they appear to have initially targeted Beler's lands at Kirby Bellars and elsewhere, (Note: Looting of lands belonging to the Despenser regime was widespread in the year following the invasion.) but within a few years petitions were issued to the Sheriff of Nottingham, "complaining that two of the Folville brothers were roaming abroad again at the head of a band, waylaying persons whom they spoiled and held to ransom".

Various indictments from the period portray Eustace and his brothers as freelance mercenaries, hired "by the ostensibly law-abiding...to commit acts of violence on their behalf". Members of Sempringham Priory and Haverholm Abbey, both in Lincolnshire, seem to have made use of their services, and at one stage the gang was apparently under the patronage of Sir Robert Tuchet, a major lord of Derbyshire and Cheshire.

=== Ransom of Richard Willoughby ===
The justice Sir Richard Willoughby, another corrupt commissioner appointed in 1323 to arrest William Trussell and Roger la Zouch, was appointed to apprehend Eustace and his brothers Robert, Walter, and John in January 1331 for allegedly stealing horses, oxen, and sheep from Henry de Beaumont. (Note: Beaumont had been one of the few friends of Piers Gaveston, but eventually threw in the towel and joined the rebellion at Bristol in October 1326 with a very large force.)

It seems to have taken a long time for Willoughby to fulfill his duty and it was not until the next year when he caught up with his prey, but rather than capturing them they instead kidnapped him. Willoughby was ransomed for the large sum of 1,300 marks and released.

The Folville gang did not answer to the charges brought against them and fled to Derbyshire where they "rode with armed force secretly and openly", allied with the Coterel gang, and were sheltered by Sir Robert Tuchet, Lord of Markeaton.

== In popular culture ==
A fictionalized version of the Folville gang is the focus of the medieval crime novel series The Folville Chronicles by Jennifer Ash, beginning with The Outlaw's Ransom in 2017. An earlier version of the novel appeared as part of Romancing Robin Hood by Ash under her Jenny Kane pseudonym.
