= Coterel gang =

14th-century organised criminal gang

The Coterel gang (also Cotterill, fl. c. 1328 – 1333) was a 14th-century armed group that flourished in the North Midlands of England. It was led by James Coterel—after whom the gang is named—supported by his brothers Nicholas and John. It was one of several such groups that roamed across the English countryside in the late 1320s and early 1330s, a period of political upheaval with an associated increase in lawlessness in the provinces. Coterel and his immediate supporters were members of the lesser gentry, and according to the tenets of the day were expected to assist the crown in the maintenance of law and order, rather than encourage its collapse.

Basing themselves in the peaks of Derbyshire and the heavily wooded areas of north Nottinghamshire (such as Sherwood Forest) the Coterels frequently cooperated with other groups, including the Folvilles. Membership of the Coterel gang increased as its exploits became more widely known; most of the new members were recruited locally, but others came from as far away as Shropshire. Despite repeated attempts by the crown to suppress the Coterels, their criminal activities increased; by 1330 they had committed murder, extortion, kidnap, and ran protection rackets across the Peak District. They do not seem to have ever been particularly unpopular with the populace, and the secular and ecclesiastical communities provided them with supplies, provisions and logistical support.

Possibly their most famous offence took place in 1332. A royal justice, Richard de Willoughby, was despatched on a commission of oyer and terminer in Leicestershire and Warwickshire, and was kidnapped by a consortium composed of both the Coterels' and the Folvilles' men. Each gang had encountered him in his professional capacity on previous occasions, and probably wanted revenge on him as much as they wanted his money. This they also received, as Willoughby paid 1,300 marks for his freedom. This outrage against a representative of the crown led King Edward III to launch a royal commission into the troubled area to bring the Coterels to justice and restore the King's peace. In the event, many gang members were arraigned, but all but one were acquitted; the Coterel brothers themselves ignored their summonses and did not even attend.

The King was politically distracted by the outbreak of the Second War of Scottish Independence; this provided him with the opportunity to recruit seasoned men to his army while appearing to solve the local disorder. As a result, most of the Coterel band received royal pardons following service abroad or in Scotland. James and the remnants of the gang received royal pardons in the aftermath of the battle of Halidon Hill in 1333, and the Coterel brothers all eventually had profitable careers. Modern scholars tend to agree that the activities and members of 14th-century groups such as the Coterels provided the basis for many of the stories later woven around Robin Hood in the 15th century.

== Background ==
=== Political context ===
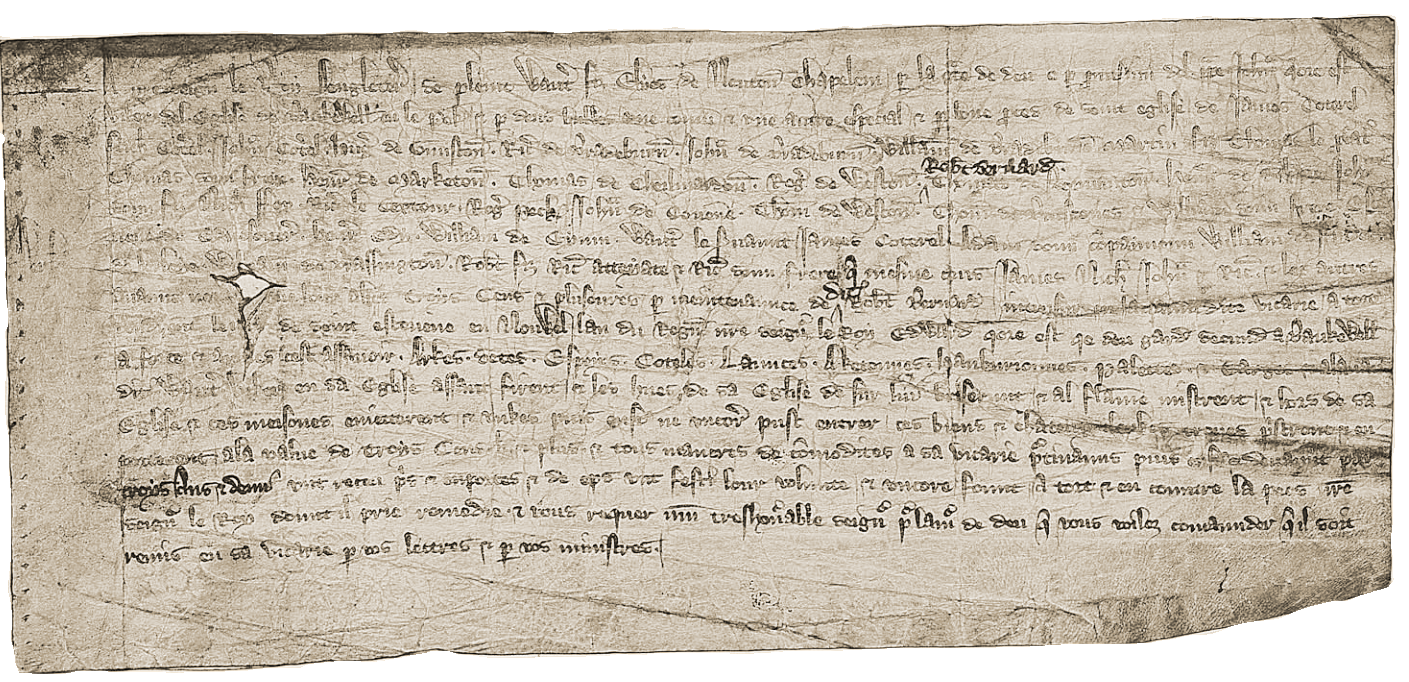
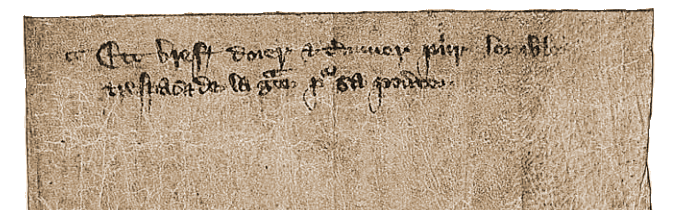

The Coterel gang was active during a period of political factionalism within central government. The king, Edward II, was extremely unpopular with his nobility, because of reliance on favourites, such as Hugh Despenser the Younger, on whom he lavished royal patronage at the expense of other barons. Despenser was hated by the English nobility, particularly those gathered around the King's cousin, Thomas, Earl of Lancaster.

In 1322 Lancaster had rebelled against Edward and his favourites, but had been defeated and executed. One of the Coterel brothers and their later allies from the Bradbourne family were also involved, so it is likely, says the historian J. R. Maddicott, that there was a political dimension to the band's activities as part of general opposition to the King. The gang at least thrived on the political chaos of the last years of Edward II's reign and the early years of that of Edward III. This was an exceptionally lawless and violent period, says the historian Michael Prestwich, "where a quarrel over a badly cooked herring could end in violent death, as happened in Lincoln in 1353".

Members of their own family were "contrariants"—opposed to the Despensers and Edward II—but this did not prevent the Coterel brothers stealing from members of that party whenever the opportunity arose. For example, after the Battle of Boroughbridge in 1322—when the contrariant nobles fought Edward II and lost—the Coterels ambushed fleeing survivors of the losing side, and robbed them of horses and armour. On another occasion they stole "a quantity of silver plate", only to be ambushed themselves by a small force of Welsh who in turn relieved them of their loot. (Note: The looting of Contrariants' estates was not confined to the Coterel gang: in the period between their defeat at Boroughbridge and the arrival of royal officials to administer them, lands were pillaged on a widespread scale, especially by "ordinary" (that is, those not involved in organised crime) people. Similar destruction had taken place on the lands of those supporters of Simon de Montfort after his defeat in 1265 following the Second Barons' War. Similar destruction later occurred to Despenser's lands following his execution in 1326. The Coterels had the advantage in these activities that they could wreak havoc faster and so much more systematically.)

=== The Coterel family ===
The Coterel family has been described as "not only numerous, but also litigious". Nicholas, James and John were the sons of a major Derbyshire landowner, Ralph Coterel. Nicholas had been involved—how deeply is unknown—in Lancaster's rebellion in 1322, for which he had received a pardon. James Coterel, in his youth, has been described as a 14th-century juvenile delinquent. He was the eldest—and, says the medievalist Barbara Hanawalt, the dominant personality—among the brothers, ("young men of prys", as they were later called) and was the acknowledged leader of the gang, which was later recorded as the "Society of James Coterel". He became of particularly high standing in the local community. His group has been described as something like a "federation of gangs", due to its fluid membership and interconnectivity with similar groups in the Derbyshire, Leicestershire, Nottinghamshire and Rutland area.

=== Origins ===
There is no firm evidence as to James Coterel's precise motives for embarking on his career in crime. Perhaps, suggests the medievalist J. G. Bellamy, having started off in a small way, he discovered that he was good at it and that it provided an easy source of income in what was a relatively wealthy area. The Coterel gang was a combination of "criminal gentry", the class on whom—"paradoxically"—the upkeep of law and order usually devolved to in the localities. They were joined by men of lower class, with a few local men forming the kernel of the gang. The group is first mentioned in official records on 2 August 1328, when the three Coterel brothers, allying with Roger le Sauvage (Note: Sauvage had already established himself as a criminal in his own right, and an extortioner par excellence, who had recently extracted £20 from William Amyas and £40 from Geoffrey Luttrell, both leading Nottinghamshire gentry. Before joining the Coterel gang, he had already committed two murders in Derby, various crimes in Oxford, had escaped to London, been arrested there, escaped again, and returned to Derbyshire, where he allied with Coterel.) and others, attacked the vicar of Bakewell, Walter Can (Newton), in his church, evicted him from it and stole ten shillings from his collection plate. The offence was committed at the instigation of Robert Bernard, who had held several important positions: he had been a clerk for the Westminster chancery, had taught at Oxford University and was, at the time of the offence, registrar of Lichfield Cathedral. Brother Bernard had himself been vicar of Bakewell in 1328 and had been forcibly ejected by his parishioners for embezzling church funds. He was, says Bellamy, "an unsavoury individual" (Note: He had been evicted from Bakewell on Christmas Day 1328. He continued his career of embezzlement at Lichfield as a chantry priest, "where on four successive founder days between 1325–9 he failed to pay the stipulated sum to the poor". In another link to the political opposition to Edward II, Barnard had been imprisoned in Oxford Gaol in 1326 for allegedly supporting Queen Isabella and Roger Mortimer.) and may have personally participated in the assault on Walter Can.

== Activities ==
The Coterels and their associates were a "greenwood gang", as they favoured making their hide-outs in the local woods. (Note: Forests were popular with outlaws as hiding places, as they were increasingly becoming beyond the reach of royal justice. Michael Prestwich notes one 14th-century outlaw who "described himself almost poetically as 'Lionel, King of the rout of raveners', writing threatening letters from 'Our castle of the wind in the Greenwood Tower in the first year of our reign'", deliberately mimicking the stilo regio, or royal style, used in Chancery letters. A modern scholar notes how "outlaws could make the innocent woods fearsome places to tread", and quotes Bartholomeus Anglicus, a contemporary monk and commentator, as saying "For often in woods thieves are hid, and often in their awaits and deceits passing men come and are spoiled and robbed and often slain.") They cooperated with similar groups, most notably with the Folvilles, and when Eustace Folville hid out in Derbyshire—"during his enforced absences" from Leicestershire—James Coterel was later described as his leader, (Note: The Folville gang is as, if not even more, infamous than the Coterels: six brothers who all turned to crime, the eldest and their leader, Eustace "was the most notorious; he committed three or four murders—one of which was of a baron of the Exchequer—a rape, and three robberies between 1327 and 1330".) although strictly the Coterels were of a lower social status (Maurice Keen wrote that James Coterel "might have ranked as a minor gentleman", while Folville was a knight). Either way, the Coterels did not merely have contacts within the gentry class; they were members of it. They were known to hide out on the "wild forests of the High Peak"—James Coterel was called "the king of the Peak"—with spies keeping a look-out for the sheriff's men; they avoided capture this way on at least one occasion. The Coterels had a strategy of never staying more than a month in the same place; they did return, intermittently, to various safe houses. One of the areas they concentrated on was around the village of Stainsby, where the Sauvage family was based and on whose manor the Coterels often made their headquarters.

Another gang, led by James Coterel and his brothers, terrorized Derbyshire and Nottinghamshire, including Sherwood Forest, from 1328 to 1332. These were no common criminals but "gentlemen," probably the younger sons of landed gentry, who, when they were not committing crimes such as robbery, extortion, and murder, often by hire, were serving in Edward III's wars in Scotland and France while holding public office as bailiffs and even MPs.

— Thomas Ohlgren

Meanwhile, King Edward II had continued alienating his nobility, and by 1326 both his wife, Queen Isabella, and his eldest son, Edward, Earl of Chester, had gone into French exile. (Note: Historians agree that hostility towards Edward was universal. W. H. Dunham and C. T. Wood ascribed this to Edward's "cruelty and personal faults", suggesting that "very few, not even his half-brothers or his son, seemed to care about the wretched man" and that none would fight for him. A contemporary chronicler described Edward as rex inutilis, or a "useless king".) Isabella soon became the focus of opposition to the King, and, with Roger Mortimer, invaded England, deposed King Edward and ruled in his stead. The Coterel gang's continuing violence—and the authorities' failure to suppress it—motivated Mortimer and Isabella to take a robust approach to law and order. This had little effect. James Coterel committed murders in Derby in 1329 and 1330, on the latter occasion killing Sir William Knyveton; in 1330 he also murdered John Matkynson in Bradley. James Coterel was attached at the Derbyshire Eyre for the crime that year, but escaped arrest. (Note: Attachment denoted the legal process by which a defendant was required by writ to provide sureties for their appearance; a Northamptonshire Gaol delivery roll from the last years of the previous century explains how the local "constables of the peace of the King, by rite and authority of their office and according to the law and custom of the realm ... have jurisdiction and power to attach malefactors and disturbers of the peace and those who are pursued by the hue and cry for felony and homicide". Bellamy notes that this was the only time in Coterel's career that he was attached at law.) Both he and Laurence were accused of ravaging the Derbyshire estates of the dead Earl of Lancaster's brother and heir, Henry, 3rd Earl of Lancaster. Lancaster later brought suit against the three Coterel brothers for the damage they had done to his park and chase in Duffield, where, he said, they had "hunted and carried away deer and did many other wrongs". The Coterels did not deign to appear in court, but in their absence judgement was given against them and the damage estimated at £60: the cattle that the Coterels stole may have been worth as much as £5,200. (Note: John Bellamy notes that this was "a large sum even allowing for probable exaggerations of the Earl of Lancaster's executors who reported the loss".) Most of the gang against whom proceedings had been attempted were found to be legally vagabonds, and the sheriff postponed the hearings three times before giving up. Sir Roger de Wennesley, Lord of Mappleton, was then dispatched to arrest them on 18 December that year. De Wennesley was a "sworn enemy" of the Coterels, having stabbed one of their relations—and Coterel gang associate—Laurence Coterel (brother) to death in March the same year. (Note: It was a policy of Edward III to use members of these groups against each other, and to take advantage of pre-existing feuds. De Wennesley was eventually to join the Coterel gang himself and was arrested in 1332.) De Wennesley was, supposedly unable to locate the gang, who were then declared outlawed in March 1331. One commentator says their outlawry "seems to have inspired them to expand the range of their criminal behaviour". Soon after de Wennesley's failed commission, the Coterels kidnapped John Staniclyf, a tenant of de Wennesley's. They refused to release Staniclyf until he swore an oath never to oppose the Coterels again, and he was forced to pay a bond of £20 to ensure his compliance.

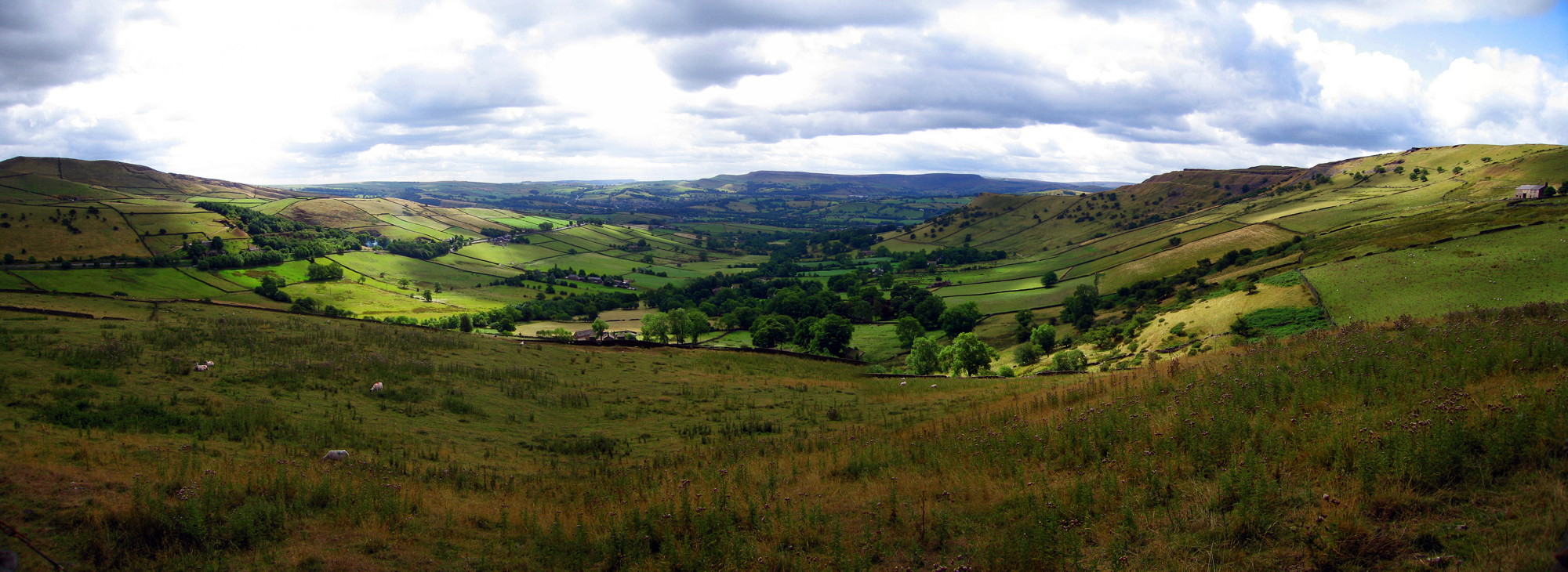
A High Peak panorama, Derbyshire, where the band headquartered occasionally while on the run

=== Peak of activity ===
The high point of the gang's activity was between March 1331 and September 1332. By this time Edward, Earl of Chester (later Edward III), had launched a coup d'état against Mortimer at Nottingham Castle. In November 1330 Mortimer was hanged at Tyburn a month later and Edward III's personal reign began. The Coterels' activities continued unabated. Roaming between the Peak District and Sherwood Forest, where they often sheltered, the group was continually joined by new recruits until it numbered at least fifty. James Coterel was later personally accused of recruiting 20 men in the Peak and Sherwood areas, but recruits could also come from afar: Sir John de Legh, for example, was from Shropshire. Many men—such as Roger le Sauvage (Note: Roger le Sauvage had borrowed 1,000 marks (Note: A medieval English mark was an accounting unit equivalent to two-thirds of a pound.) from Sir William Aune (who would later be a staunch supporter of the Coterels), and then entailed his manor of Stainsby on his wife before joining Coterel.)—joined after getting into debt and being outlawed when they were unable to pay their creditors. Like Sauvage, some members were already outlawed when they sought membership; many were not, and seem not to have had any previous criminal record. Increased numbers allowed the gang to expand its operations, both geographically and by type. In 1331 they were joined by Sir William Chetulton of Staffordshire (already, says Bellamy, an "infamous gang leader" himself by this point), who had previously operated in Sir James Stafford's gang in Lancashire. In December 1331, the group was joined by John Boson, an esquire from Nottingham who held land off William, Lord Ros; Bosun's father not only had been an outlaw himself but had been an early associate of James Coterel.

The Coterel gang were the subject of multiple presentments throughout their short career, and committed at least two murders as well as extortions (Note: A favoured method of extortion was simple but effective. It would be arranged for the intended victim to receive a severe (but not life-threatening) beating, following which, he would be approached by others and offered protection from any future attacks.) and kidnappings around the Peak District, running protection rackets, and generally involving themselves in the feuds of their neighbours. Until mid-1331 the group had made a name for themselves by committing extreme acts of violence; it seems that from then they made it a policy to avoid violence where possible and concentrate on more financially profitable schemes. They became particularly involved in extortion, and Hanawalt has described their technique as being refined: they possessed "such an evil reputation for extortion that they only had to send a letter threatening damage to life, limb, and property in order to extort money".

... These plunderers, kidnappers and murderers nevertheless appear in a matrix of affinities and patronage coextensive with the local gentry.

— Howard Kaminsky

This was the gang's method with the mayor of Nottingham, to whom they wrote demanding £20—"or else". They used the indenture system: (Note: An indenture was a legal contract between two parties, particularly for indentured labour and land transactions. The term comes from the medieval English "indenture of retainer". The contract was written in duplicate on the same sheet, with the copies separated by cutting along a jagged line—toothed (in Latin "indenture")—so that the teeth of the two parts could later be refitted to confirm authenticity, known as a chirograph.) one half of the indentured contract was sent to the victim with the demand, and the sum demanded was to be paid to whoever arrived at the appointed time bearing the other half of the indenture. (Note: In law this was called "extortion by false letters and counterfeit seals".) This seems to have been a particular speciality of two members, William Pymme of Sutton Bonington and Roger Sauvage, and one of the bearers they used in 1332 to carry such a letter to William Amyas, a wealthy Nottingham ship owner, was Pymme's mother. In direct imitation of royal justice, they demanded tribute from the local populace; William Amyas was told that, if he failed to comply, "everything he held outside of Nottingham would be burned". On another occasion they went, mob-handed, to the house of Robert Franceys, where they forced him to hand over £2; Fraunceys, so a chronicler wrote, was sufficiently scared by his experience that "he left his house and did not return for a long time". A Bakewell man, Ralph Murimouth, was forced to hand over £5.

They did all this with apparent immunity. In 1331 the gang kidnapped Robert Foucher of Osmaston (whom they knew would soon be wealthy, as he was due to be granted some local parkland). One of their most notorious acts was not extortion, but another kidnapping—that of Sir Richard Willoughby, a royal justice, whom they captured in 1332.

=== Kidnapping of Richard Willoughby ===
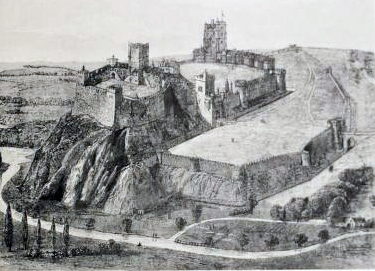
Victorian illustration reconstructing Nottingham castle and environs in the later medieval period

The kidnap of Richard Willoughby has been described by historians Anthony Musson and Mark Ormrod as a "daring and very high-profile event". He was captured in Melton Mowbray on 14 January 1332 and spirited away while on a judicial commission in the East Midlands. The Coterels, accompanied by members of the Folville gang, numbered between 20 and 30 men. In exchange for Willougby's life, they demanded 1,300 marks for his release. (Note: To put this figure in some context, when Gilbert de Clare, 8th Earl of Gloucester died in 1314, his estate was valued at around 4,000 marks annually, and in 1337, when King Edward III created a raft of new earls, their titles were each endowed with an income of 666 marks yearly. When in 1314 Humphrey de Bohun, 4th Earl of Hereford was captured by the Scottish at the Battle of Bannockburn, he was subsequently granted 1,000 marks to cover his costs by the king.) Willoughby was taken from wood to wood, stopping over at Morkery woods in Lincolnshire before travelling south to their destination at a place called Sevenoaks in Rockingham Forest, Northamptonshire, where they were later received and maintained by the constable of Rockingham Castle, Robert de Veer. Willoughby was a wealthy man, and raised the necessary amount in the following weeks. (Note: Because he had been on the King's business at the time of the kidnap, he was subsequently granted an annuity of 100 marks in compensation. Willoughby made his family "the wealthiest non-baronial family" in Derbyshire. His career in royal service came to an end in 1340 when the King imprisoned him on charges of corruption, forcing Willoughby to pay 1,200 marks for a pardon and his freedom.) Clearly, says Hanawalt, the risks associated with attacking such a prominent individual were deemed to be acceptable in expectation of such large amounts. The Folvilles received 300 marks of the ransom. It is likely that the Coterels and their associates were motivated at least in part by the fact that many of them would have come up against Willoughby on previous occasions in his capacity as a puisne judge who was regularly active on commissions of oyer and terminer in the region. It is known that in June 1329 he investigated the pillaging of the Earl of Lancaster's lands by the Coterels, and in 1331 he heard the complaint of the vicar of Bakewell over his eviction by the gang. Willoughby was notoriously corrupt—the royal yearbooks would later report Willoughby as selling the laws of the land "as if they were cattle or oxen"—and according to the near-contemporary Knighton's Chronicon, the Coterel associates had much to feel aggrieved about: Willoughby had been the judge in several cases against members of the group. He was, says Bellamy, "thus a fit subject for humiliation". His kidnap was almost certainly the chance for revenge "for some wrong or imagined wrong once suffered" as much as, if not more than, financial gain.

The distribution of the ransom took place in one of Sir Robert Touchet's manors at Markeaton Park; Touchet was a prominent Midlands landowner, and was probably the Coterels' chief patron. With his brother, Edmund Touchet—who was parson of nearby Mackworth—he knew and approved of the Coterel scheme. These men, who provided the gang with material assistance when it was required, were an exemplar of the kind of support the Coterels enjoyed locally. The kidnapping of Willoughby was not merely a local outrage, but, says the historian John Aberth, for the crown it was "an unprecedented assault on the dignity of its bench and the authority of its law". In Derbyshire, there was a "widespread lack of sympathy" for the judge.

==== Royal response ====
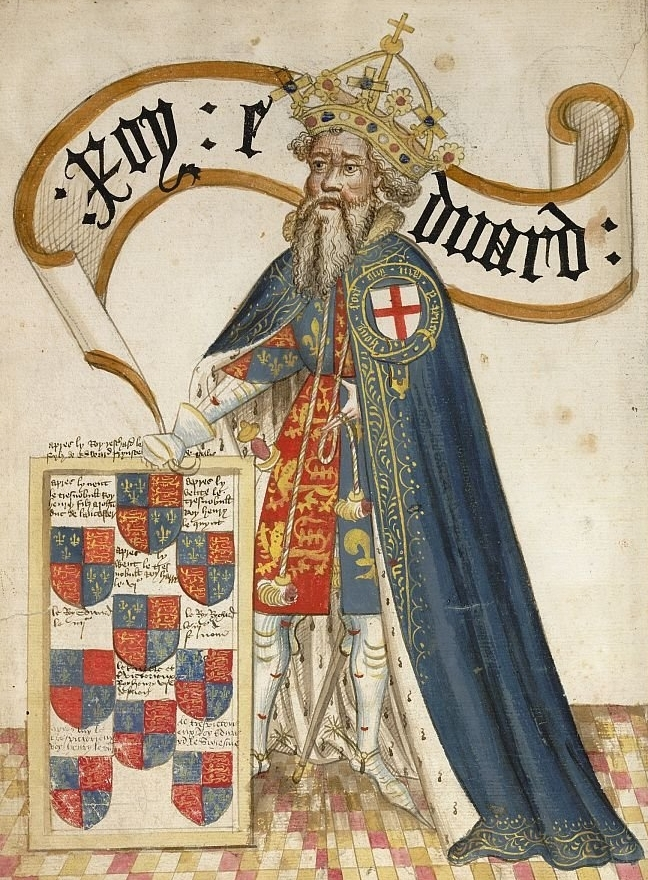
King Edward III, as represented in an early 15th-century illuminated manuscript

In response to Willoughby's kidnapping, the King despatched a "powerful" judicial commission to the north Midlands in March 1332. Fifty men were brought before the bench. In the event, many indictments were presented and heard, but "hardly any of the principals were brought into court, much less convicted", even though King Edward personally attended the sessions held at Stamford, Lincolnshire. Some of those arrested were bailed; for example, Roger de Wennesley—who by now had joined the gang he had been sent to arrest the previous year—while on bail became a forger and wrote "pretended letters to arrest certain persons ... by means of which he extorted money daily". Of the fifty brought to the bench, only one—de Uston—was convicted. This was William de Uston, who was acquitted of a charge of assault but then sentenced to death for robbery. It may be that, in spite of recent provisions strengthening the powers of a town's night watch and jail delivery, juries composed of local people were unwilling to accuse men who were their neighbours; in 1332 the majority of accusations the presentment juries made were against men in other towns. The lack of convictions may not have been only due to fear of reprisals among the jurors. They may also reflect sympathy for the group, and perhaps a general unwillingness to condemn anyone who, as Bellamy put it, was "not of notorious record".

A jury of presentment, composed of men from the hundreds of Wirksworth and Appeltree, sat in September 1332, (Note: These records are of the 1332–1333 presentments held before Richard de Grey, Henry de Grey, John Darcy, Nicholas de Langeford, John de Twyford and Richard de la Pole, keepers of the peace. They consist of a roll of 13 membranes, have been fully translated from the original Latin and transcribed by the Historical Manuscripts' Commission in 1911, who published them as part of their Report on the Manuscripts of Lord Middleton Preserved at Wollaton Hall, Nottinghamshire, pp. 272–283.) and claimed that the gang was known to collaborate with Robert Bernard, backed by the Chapter of Lichfield Cathedral. This commission documented the Coterels' activities minutely, and, Anthony Musson says, it is "a tribute to the functioning of the judicial machinery" of the county in the midst of a severe break down in order that it was able to do so. (Note: Musson points out that the amount of time the jury devoted to investigating the Coterels is demonstrated by the amount of the roll devoted to it. The roll is held by The National Archives in Kew, classification JUST 1:1411b. The Folvilles are recorded on membranes two to six, and the Coterels are on seven and eight.)

=== Support for the gang ===
The Coterels poached, ambushed, had a spy in Nottingham, ill-treated clerics, were pursued by bounty hunters and the sheriff, operated in Sherwood, entered royal service, had as an ally a member of the gentry who had lost his inheritance, were retained at one time by a local magnate and wore his livery, and were pardoned by the King.

— John Bellamy

The Coterels received a strong degree of support from among the regional public generally and the gentry and churchmen particularly. Within Lichfield Cathedral, apart from Robert Bernard, there were seven canons including John Kinnersley, who were all later accused of being supporters of the Coterels and of providing James with "protection, succour and provisions". (Note: This was not as uncommon as may be assumed, says Prestwich, "and some remarkable stories were told" of the phenomenon by contemporaries. In 1317, six monks from Rufford Priory assaulted, robbed and kidnapped Thomas of Holm, and demanded a ransom of £200. On another occasion, the rector of Manchester "invited a couple and their daughter to dine; but after dinner, two of the rector's servants came and seized the daughter, beat her so that her ribs were broken and put her in the rector's bed. He spent the night with her; she died a month later of her injuries.") There was, comments Bellamy, "no lack of worldly knowledge in the Lichfield cloisters": Kinnersley was James Coterel's legal receiver on multiple occasions. The Cathedral chapter supported the gang even after its activities had become the subject of an official investigation. It seems probable that the chapter directly employed them several times, for instance, for the robbing of the vicar of Bakewell, and to collect tithes. The Cathedral chapter's support for Coterel was instrumental in protecting him from arrest. Also among the Coterel's local supporters was the Cluniac prior of Lenton, Nottinghamshire, who on at least one occasion gave them advance warning of an intended trailbaston commission (Note: The Prior of Lenton and the Dean and Chapter of Litchfield's support for James Coterel was one of the few things they agreed on—they had repeatedly clashed over possession of various High Peak district advowsons, and the fact that they came together over Coterel illustrates how highly he was regarded by them. James Coterel would later act as a tax collector for the priory, and "was even entrusted with one arrest warrant in 1336 and another in 1350, when he and six others were instructed to find and capture three monks of Lenton" who had absconded from their House.) led by Richard de Grey. Similar support was received from the Cistercian house at Haverholme.

While on the run, local people kept the men supplied with material support as well as information. Such peripheral supporters were always far more numerous than the gang itself, and it has been estimated that the Coterels could rely on around 150 such supporters (57 of whom were from the villages of Bakewell and Mackworth alone). Such support was not wholly based on fear, but neither did people believe that outlaws were romantic figures out to help the community; perhaps, says Hanawalt, "respect and a reluctant admiration" was the prevailing attitude of the populace. For example, Walter Aune delivered a quantity of food to them in the woods on one occasion. (Note: Aune was unlikely to have been acting out of fear or as because of threats; one of James Coterel's closest allies was Walter's brother Sir William Aune.) On another he delivered the rents from Richard le Sauvage's Stainsby manor to Sauvage while the latter was hiding out with the Coterels. When the gang was hiding out in Bakewell they were brought sustenance by local man Nicholas Taddington; Taddington also showed them secret paths around the countryside. Occasionally they had to actively forage for food, and Pymme is known to have sent his servants and members of his household out for this purpose.

The Coterel gang enjoyed support within local officialdom as well, including at least six bailiffs in the High Peak area. They were supporters but not necessarily active members, and included at least seven local men who attended parliament during the decade. Another "clandestine ally" was Sir Robert Ingram, whom the Coterels had personally recruited. Ingram was a man of some importance; he was High Sheriff of Nottingham and Derbyshire between 1322 and 1323 and then from 1327 to 1328 as well as mayor of Nottingham for two terms, 1314–1316 and 1320–1324; It was Ingram who wrote to a Coterel spy (or explorator) in Nottingham Castle, William de Usfton, who was not only lord of the manor of Radmanthwaite in Nottinghamshire but also a counterfeiter. Ingram's letter informed the Coterels that their base in the High Peak forest had just been discovered, and thus enabled their escape. Not everyone supported them; in 1331, a petition was presented to parliament which complained about members of the gentry uniting to kidnap and kill the king's loyal officials—almost certainly an oblique reference to the Coterel gang. A jury later reported how the band "rode armed publicly and secretly in manner of war by day and night".

== Later events ==
The Coterels and their men received few, if any, legal penalties, and James Coterel was eventually pardoned of all "extortions, oppressions, receivings of felons, usurpations, and ransoms" in 1351, probably at the instigation of Queen Philippa, whose patronage he seems to have enjoyed even during his days of criminality. (Note: Payling suggests that this is likely because James brother Nicholas was bailiff of Philippa's Derbyshire liberty, although Nicholas did not, says Payling, "acquit himself well in that office, since he was summoned before the King's Council to answer a charge of embezzlement in 1359".) The few members of the gang who were eventually brought before the King's Bench in 1333 were acquitted, and the three Coterel brothers seem to have continued receiving the patronage of Lichfield Cathedral, while Barnard retained both his employment at Oxford University and his church living until his death in 1341.

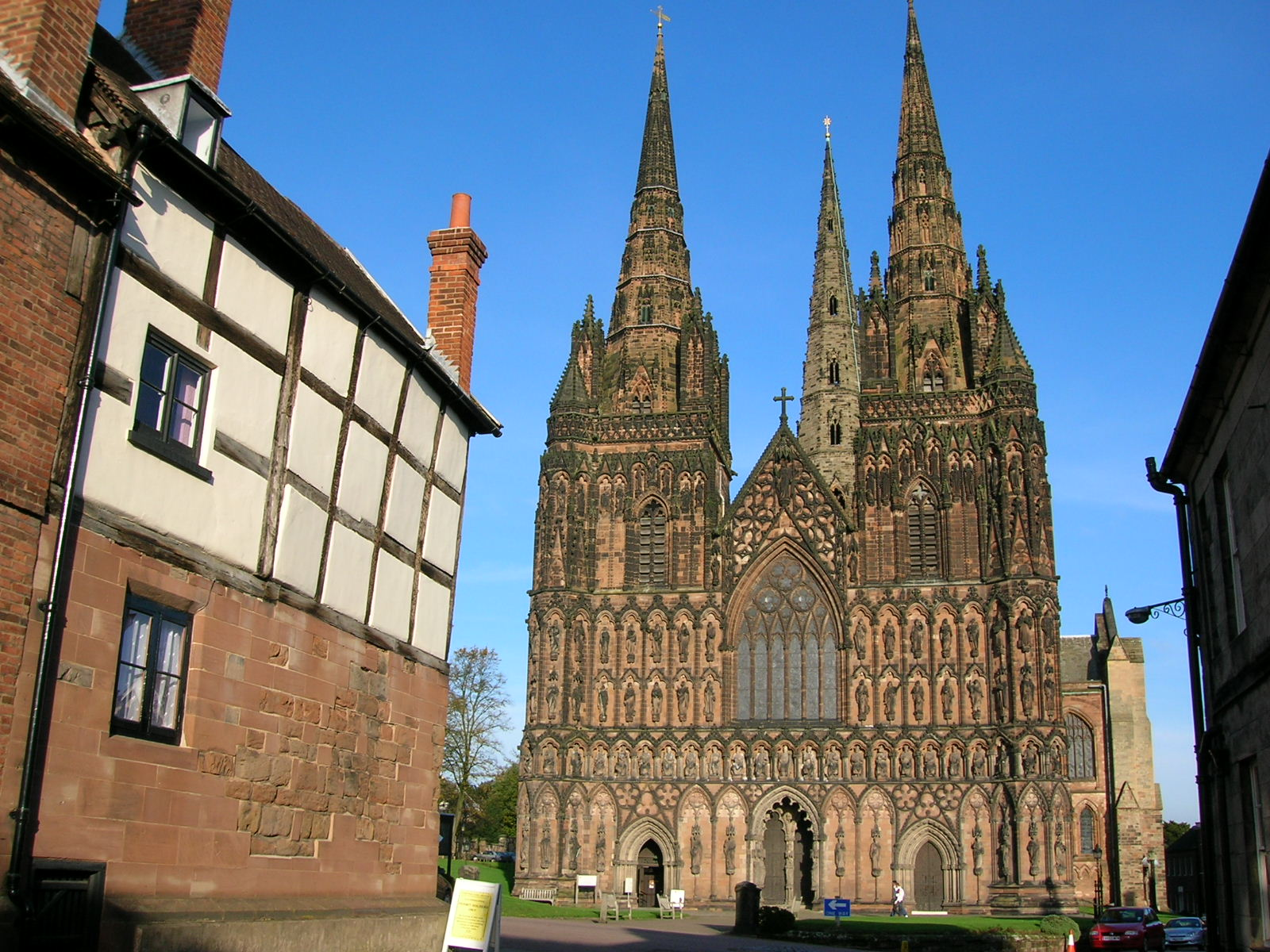
West front of Lichfield Cathedral; the Dean and Chapter hired the Coterel gang from the beginning, protected them during their crime wave, and then supported them in later years.

Many members of the band appear to have undertaken royal service in Scotland and in the Hundred Years' War in France in the latter years of the decade, which led directly to the end of the gang's activities. This included de Legh in 1330, and both James' and Nicholas Coterel's names are on the 1338 summons to join the royal army in Flanders. The crown, for its part, withdrew its commissions from the region claiming that the king's peace had been restored; in reality, it had been distracted by the renewal of war with Scotland the previous year, and, writes E. L. G. Stones, "the impetus of the general attack on disorder, which had seemed so strong in March 1332, rapidly declined". Bellamy notes how usual this was: "expenditure of royal energy meant temporary success"; but, with the King preoccupied with projects abroad, the status quo ante soon returned. For their part, those who fought for the King were pardoned by him on their return for the offences they had previously committed. There were rewards too: in May 1332, James Coterel was granted the wardship of Elizabeth Meverel. Coterel's ally Chetulton was sentenced to hang, but produced a pardon obtained for him by Ralph, Lord Neville; when it looked as though a second murder could be laid at his door, he was able to produce a second pardon. By July, Chetulton was back in royal favour, and commissioned to capture robbers in Nottingham. In 1334, Sir William Aune was appointed surveyor of the King's Welsh castles, and that same year, William de Uston—the only member of the gang to have been convicted, and, indeed, sentenced to death—was commissioned to investigate some murders in Leicester that were believed to have been carried out by Sir Richard Willoughby's servants. One of the last occurrences of James Coterel's name in official records indicates that he too regained the King's trust, as in November 1336, "he was on the right side of law", having been commissioned to arrest a "miscreant Leicestershire parson". They were, says Bellamy, reformed characters, and the Coterel brothers would never again ride armata potentia—armed and in power. (Note: The King, meanwhile, continued and expanded his policy of pardoning criminals in return for military service: "thousands" were issued during his reign, says the medievalist Andrew Ayton, with "several thousand" recorded during the siege of Calais of 1346–1347. Although Ayton notes that "many of the pardons were of a general nature, suggesting that in some cases they had been sought as a precautionary measure rather than to deal with the legal consequences of specific crimes", there was sufficient concern domestically that the House of Commons complained to Edward that "many murders, woundings, robberies, homicides, rapes and other felonies and misdeeds without number are done and maintained in the kingdom because the evildoers are granted charters of pardon ... to the great destruction of the people".)

== Scholarship ==
The Coterel gang has been described by a late 20th-century historian as being the locus of an "apparent disregard for the law which has been shown as emanating from the Midlands", demonstrating the degree to which the crown lacked control over the provinces. They have also been identified as accelerating the legal concept of conspiracy, which was in its infancy. Royal authority had been weakened by its appearance of powerlessness in the face of the Coterels' widespread and systematic lawlessness. The Coterels' activities show how "interwoven the criminal, the military, and the royal administrative" could be; sometimes, says Carter Revard, "the outlaw of one year could be the brave soldier of the next". (Note: Revard gives a similar example, from a few years later, in Sir Laurence Ludlow, who in 1340 was outlawed for assault and battery, but also requested to collect the Black Prince's feudal dues for him in Stokesay.)

The Coterels were "unique to th[eir] time and location", and, suggests one scholar, symptomatic of a changing system of retaining, in which once-firm ties to a supporting lord had become much more fluid and uncertain, with the result that some men effectively chose to operate outside the feudal system. While much of the gang warfare that plagued England in the early 14th century can be put down to the return of unemployed soldiery from the north, as contemporary chroniclers were prone to assume, organised crime such as that of the Coterels'—which does not seem to have contained this element of demobilization—were, suggest the historians Musson and Ormrod, "the product more of the disturbed state of domestic politics in the 1320s than of the crown's war policies".

=== Fictional connections ===
It would be wrong to romanticize. The Folvilles, the Coterels and their like were tough, brutal and unscrupulous men, some way removed from their more refined counterparts of the ballads. Their attacks were particularly directed against the rich; they specialized in extortion ... Such victims were probably selected, not from any tender respect for 'social justice', but rather from a well-judged sense of where the best pickings lay.

— John Maddicott

The medievalist John Bellamy has drawn attention to the degree to which the tales of Robin Hood and Gamelyn intersect in detail with known historical events such as those the Coterels were involved in; he also notes that there are probably an equal number of points on which the stories diverge from history. A comparison to Gamelyn shows how, even while that lord was a fugitive, his tenants "maintain their deference and loyalty to him ... they go down on their knees, doff their hoods, and greet him as 'here lord'", all the while keeping him fully abreast of the state of legal proceedings against him. Gamelyn as "king of the outlaws" was also reflected in the fame of the Coterel gang in local society. Likewise, the Coterels' propensity for attacking royal officials is "very much Gamelyn style", says T. A. Shippey, as was the King's willingness to pardon them in return for military service. (Note: King Edward III's policy of pardoning has been the subject of much debate among historians. It has been estimated that many pardons—ranging from 900 to possibly well over a thousand—were granted to returning soldiers between 1339 and 1340 (all in acknowledgement of participation in the Flanders' campaign): of these, it has been suggested that around three-quarters were murderers. John Bellamy has suggested that the King's intention was not only to avail himself of a large pool of men willing to fight, but to remove them from the theatre by sending them abroad, and, hopefully, drain their energies for the future. The practice was unpopular with contemporaries: petitions had been submitted to parliament in 1328, 1330, 1336 and 1340 against it.)

Similarities have been noticed between the tales of Robin Hood and the activities of such armed groups as the Coterels, particularly in their attacks upon authority figures; the pavage imposed by Hood's gang is similar to the tribute extorted by the Coterels. The tale of Adam Bell was similarly shaped by the Coterels' and Folvilles' activities.

R. B. Dobson and John Taylor suggested that there was only a limited connection between the invention of Robin Hood and the criminal activities of the Coterels, who do not, summarises Maurice Keen, "seem to offer very promising matter for romanticization". However, contemporaries were aware of such a link: in 1439 a petition against another Derbyshire gangster, Piers Venables, complained that he robbed and stole with many others and then disappeared into the woods "like as it had been Robin Hood and his meiny". John Maddicott, on the other hand, notes an "accumulation of coincidences" between the Coterel and Folville gangs and the exploits recounted of Hood. These he lists principally as

An unprincipled abbot of St Mary's, York, who lent money to knights and others; a chief justice who, as a Yorkshireman, may well have been retained by the abbot and who had some reputation for the illicit use of power; and a corrupt sheriff of Nottingham, detested both by the gentry and by the lesser men of his county and finally outlawed for his misdeeds.

Maddicott describes the capture of Willoughby as very much "a feat reminiscent of the world of ballads" and the gang's popularity as "close to the standing of Robin Hood and his men as folk heroes". The people who actively supported and aided the Coterels in Derbyshire, says Maddicott, were also those who, another time, were the audience of the Hood ballads. After all, he says, they did take from the rich, "even if they did not give to the poor, and if the rich were also royal officials, like Willoughby, such retribution may have seemed well deserved". David Feldman likewise describes the Coterels and their supporters as "disgruntled gentry with an eye for the main chance" who set themselves up as Robin Hood types, except, like Maddicott, Feldman reiterates that what they "robbed from the rich never reached the poor". They possessed a certain "gentrified behaviour", as it has been called, along with the more usual brutality of the gangs, which dovetail in the ballads.

Coterel's ally Robert Ingram has been proposed as the original inspiration for the sheriff of Nottingham in the Gest of Robin Hood, a late 15th-century re-telling of the tale. The close association with criminally-minded ecclesiastics and blatant outlaws such as the Coterels have also been linked to the fiction of Friar Tuck, who, whilst being a "large, merry body" was also the leader of his own "merry gang of murderers and thieves". (Note: In a similar comparison to that between Robin Hood and James Coterel, there was a real Friar Tuch—one Richard Stafford, a chaplain, who was known as Frere Tuck, and, like the Coterels, "was never tried in a court, perhaps because ... he never bothered to appear".) John Maddicot has concluded that while the links between fiction and reality are strong, it is

Perhaps more likely that the character of Robin Hood may well have taken the career of some real outlaw, such as James Coterel ... given him a fictitious name, and embroidered his progress in a series of episodes peopled with identifiable villains and set against real backgrounds in Barnsdale and Sherwood Forest.

== See also ==
- History of Derbyshire
