= Adam Bell =

Legendary English outlaw and archer

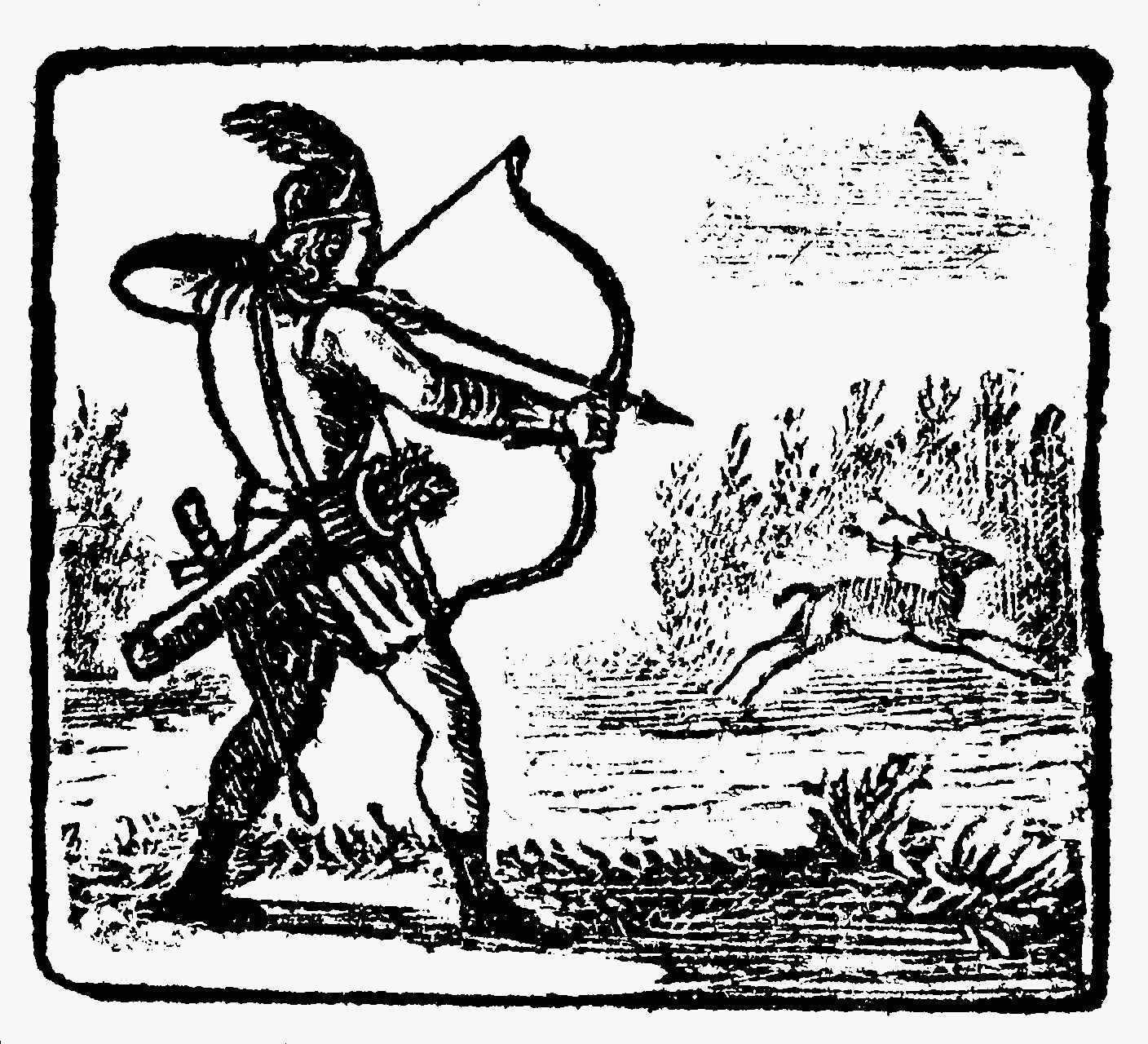
Woodcut illustration of Adam Bell, likely from the 19th century

Adam Bell was a legendary English outlaw. He and his companions William of Cloudsley and Clym of the Clough lived in Inglewood Forest near Carlisle and were figures similar to Robin Hood. Their story is told in Child Ballad 116 entitled Adam Bell, Clym of the Cloughe and Wyllyam of Cloudeslee. The basis of the tale has historical roots in the criminal activities of the Folville and Coterel gangs. At one point William of Cloudsley, who is famed as an archer, shoots an arrow through an apple on his son's head at six score paces, a feat also ascribed to William Tell and other heroes. The oldest known copy of this ballad was printed by Wynkyn de Worde in 1505. There are notable parallels between this ballad and that of Robin Hood and the Monk, but whether either legend was the source for the other cannot be established.

== Surviving early copies ==
Name of publisher	Date	Lines included	Location (if available)
Wynkyn de Worde	C. 1510	221-446	Unknown
Unknown	C. 1500-1530	53-111	In possession of J. Payne Collier
Iohan (John) Bydell	2 June 1536	452-506, 642-680	Cambridge University
William Copeland	C. 1556	Complete	Various universities

== In popular culture ==
In the prologue to Howard Pyle's 1883 novel The Merry Adventures of Robin Hood, Little John upon first meeting Robin favorably compared Robin's skill at archery to that of Adam Bell.

Adam Bell is the chief protagonist of the penny dreadful novel by Pierce Egan the Younger entitled Adam Bell, or, The Archers of Englewood published in 1842.

G. Blakemore Evans and John Upton both argue that Adam Bell is the "Adam" mentioned by Shakespeare in Much Ado About Nothing, I, i, 257-9:

...hang me in a bottle like a cat, and shoot at me, and he that hits me, let him be clapp'd on
the shoulder, and call'd Adam.

Adam Bell was played by Bryan Marshall in the Robin of Sherwood episode Adam Bell. In this particular storyline, Bell sacrifices his life so that Robin can rescue the Sheriff of Nottingham's nephew Martin from his murderous uncle.
