= Ashby Folville =

Village in Leicestershire, England

Coordinates: 52.701377°N 0.955987°W

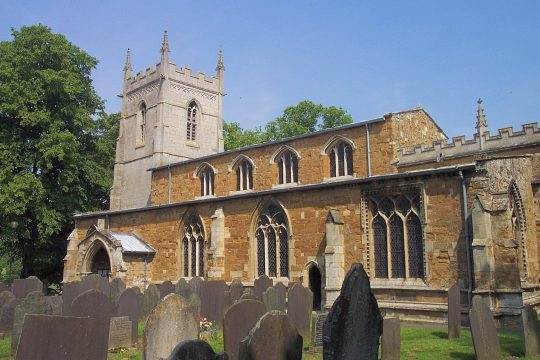
- St Mary's Church, Ashby Folville

- Location within Leicestershire
- OS grid reference: SK706120
- Civil parish: Gaddesby
- District: Melton
- Shire county: Leicestershire
- Region: East Midlands
- Country: England
- Sovereign state: United Kingdom
- Post town: MELTON MOWBRAY
- Postcode district: LE14
- Dialling code: 01664
- Police: Leicestershire
- Fire: Leicestershire
- Ambulance: East Midlands
- UK Parliament: Melton and Syston
- Website: http://www.ashbyfolville.com

Ashby Folville is a village and former civil parish, now in the parish of Gaddesby, in the Melton district of Leicestershire, England, south west of Melton Mowbray. In 1931 the parish had a population of 123.

== History ==
The village of 'Ashby' was recorded in the Domesday Book as consisting of twenty-four villagers, three smallholders, two slaves, one priest and being owned by the Countess Judith.

By the time of the Leicestershire Survey of 1124-29 the manor had passed from Judith to her daughter Maud, Countess of Huntingdon and her husband King David I of Scotland.

On 1 April 1936 the parish was abolished and its 1,796 acres (727 ha) were merged with Gaddesby.

=== The Folville Family ===
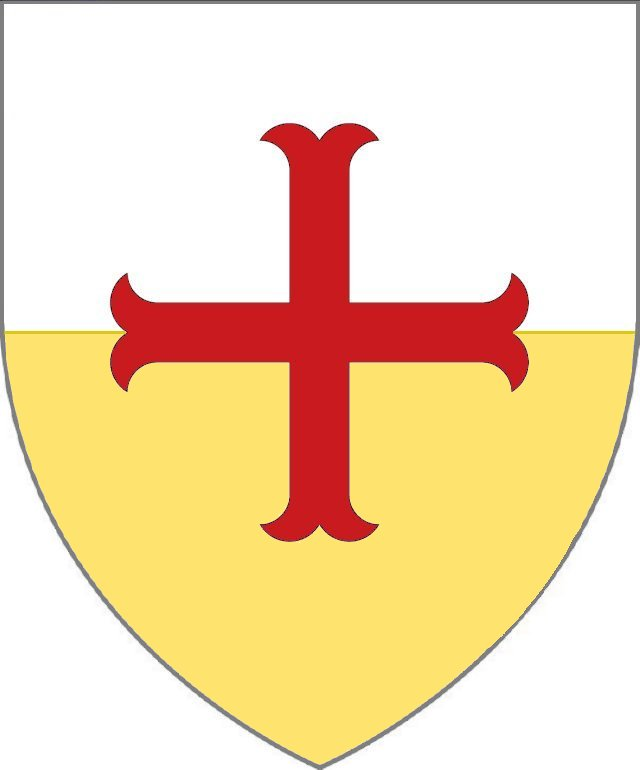
Arms of Folville - party per fess, argent & or, a cross moline gules

The Folville element of the placename comes from a family that had its seat here since at least 1137 when its lordship was held of the Honour of Huntingdon by Fulk de Folville. The family name, ultimately derived from Folleville in the French region of Picardy, was attached to several other sites in Leicestershire, including the deserted village of Newbolt Folville.

They seem to have gained most their estate at the beginning of the 12th century. Several of their possessions, such as Ashby and the manor at Teigh in Rutland, were in the hands of other parties at the time of the Domesday survey, but had passed to the Folvilles by the reign of Stephen (1135-1154). The family were certainly well-established in Leicestershire by the mid 13th century. In 1240 a member of the family donated a large sum to the church at Cranoe.

The Folvilles were rebels during both Barons Wars; Sir William Folville (died about 1240) had his lands seized for his part in the First Barons' War in 1216 and Sir Eustace Folville (murdered in 1274) was one of the knights appointed to enforce the Provisions of Oxford in 1258 and stoutly defended Kenilworth Castle after the Battle of Evesham in 1265.

The family gained renown during the reign of Edward II, when they ambushed and killed the Baron of the Exchequer, Roger de Beler. Hugh le Despenser, 1st Earl of Winchester had been stealing people's lands in Leicestershire, using Roger de Beler as an enforcer, and in 1325 de Beler had threatened the Folville family with violence. By the beginning of 1326 much of the country had turned against Edward and the Despencers and preparations for a rebellion led by Edward's wife, Queen Isabella and Roger Mortimer had started. The Folville family, headed by Eustace Folville, and encouraged by Sir Roger la Zouch, Lord of Lubbesthorpe murdered de Beler before fleeing to Paris. Following Isabella and Mortimer's successful invasion of England, Edward III was crowned and rebels were pardoned including the Folville family who were celebrated locally with the Folville Cross, said to be located at the site of de Beler's murder.

The Folville Gang flitted in and out of outlawry for many years, but, apart from Richard Folville, vicar of Teigh, who was beheaded in his own churchyard, they ended with their freedom intact.

The manor of Ashby eventually passed via marriage from the Folvilles to the Woodfords and then Smiths.

== Landmarks ==
After World War II, a resettlement camp for displaced people from Poland was established in a former US Army base in the grounds of Ashby Folville Manor.

== Religious sites ==
St Mary's Church, Ashby Folville is a Grade I listed building. The Ashby Folville estate was bought in 1890 by Herbert Smith-Carington, then mayor of Worcester (died 1917), who built cottages and a village institute and restored the church. The old wooden roofs of the nave and the new oak panels of the chancel and screen of the Woodford chapel are among the features of interest. In the chancel are memorials to Ralph Woodford (a descendant of the Folvilles) and Elizabeth Woodford. Monuments in the Woodford chapel include a stone knight known as "Old Folville" and the fine monument of Sir Francis Smith and his wife. Stained glass windows by Veronica Whall and Edward Woore were erected in memory of members of the Smith-Carington family.
