= Robert de Hellewell =

Member of the Parliament of England

Sir Robert de Hellewell

Knight of the Shire for Rutland

MP for Rutland
- In office 1340
- Monarch: Edward III

Personal details
- Born: 1285
- Children: Robert de Hellewell
- Parent: William de Hellewell

Sir Robert de Hellewell was a member of the Folville Gang that slew the Baron of the Exchequer, Sir Roger de Beler and was Rutland's MP in 1340.

== Career ==
Robert was certified as one of the Lords of Whissendine, Rutland in 1316.

In 1322 he was summoned to perform military service against the Scottish but could not be found at his manor house at Whissendine being retained by William la Zouch, 1st Baron Zouche of Haryngworth.

On 24 January 1326 an arrest warrant was issued to apprehend those involved in the murder of the corrupt Baron of the Exchequer and ardent supporter of the Despencers, Sir Roger de Beler, who had been killed going from Kirby Bellars to Leicester. On 1 March a warrant was issued that named Sir Robert de Hellewell as one of the gang and his land and goods were seized on 24 March.

Robert represented Rutland in the Parliament of January 1340.

== Bibliography ==
- Calendar of Inquisitions Post Mortem. Vol. V. London: HMSO. 1908.
- Patent Rolls. Westminster: Parliament of England. 1232–1509.
- Members of Parliament 1213-1702. London: Public Record Office. 1878.
- Parliamentary Writs Alphabetical Digest. Vol. II. London: Public Record Office. 1834.
