= John Folville =

Member of the Parliament of England

Sir John Folville
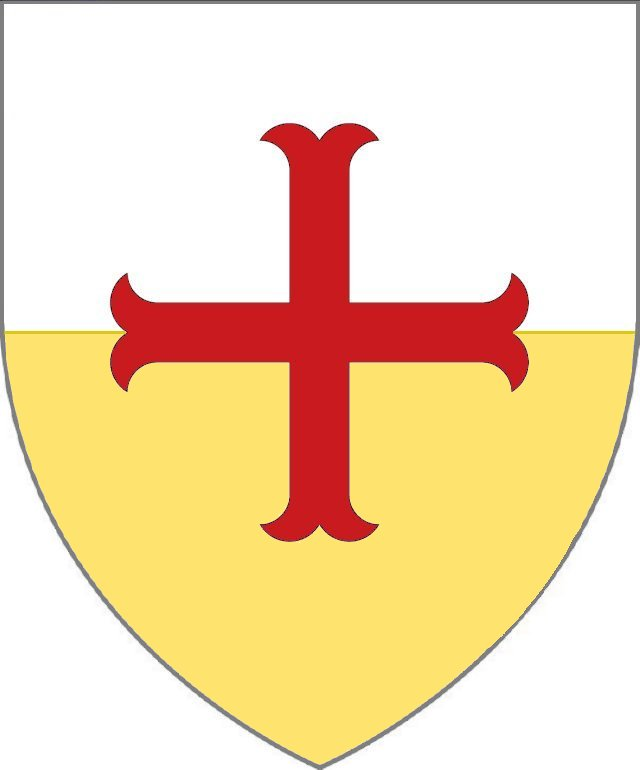
- John Folville Arms: party per fess, argent & or, a cross moline gules

Knight of the Shire for Rutland & Leicestershire

MP for Rutland
- In office 1298
- Monarch: Edward I
- In office 1301
- Monarch: Edward I

MP for Leicestershire
- In office March 1300 – May 1306

Personal details
- Died: 1310
- Spouse: Alice
- Parent: Eustace Folville (d. 1274)

Sir John Folville was a member of parliament (MP) for Rutland and Leicestershire and father of Eustace Folville, the leader of the Folville Gang. More recent research shows Farnham's Folville pedigree is flawed. The leader of the Folville gang was the issue of Sir Eustace (who died shortly before 1284) by Dame Alice.

== Ancestry ==
The Folvilles had their seat at Ashby Folville, Leicestershire since at least 1137 when its lordship was held by Fulk de Folville. The family name, ultimately derived from Folleville in the French region of Picardy, is attached to several other sites in Leicestershire, such as the deserted village of Newbolt Folville.

The family seems to have gained most their estate at the beginning of the 12th century. Several of their possessions, such as Ashby and the manor at Teigh, were in the hands of other parties at the time of the Domesday survey, but had passed to the Folvilles by the reign of Stephen (1135–1154). The family were well-established in Leicestershire by the mid 13th-century. In 1240 a member of the family donated a large sum to the church at Cranoe.

The Folvilles were rebels during both Barons Wars; Sir William Folville (d. c. 1240) had his lands seized for his part in the First Barons' War in 1216 and Sir Eustace Folville (murdered in 1274) was one of the knights appointed to enforce the Provisions of Oxford in 1258 and stoutly defended Kenilworth Castle after the Battle of Evesham in 1265.

== Career and Life ==
Folville was summoned with horses and arms to a Military Council before the King's teenage son and Lieutenant of England held at Rochester, Kent in September 1297, a few days before the English defeat at the Battle of Stirling Bridge. John was ordered to muster at Newcastle Upon Tyne for service against the Scots in December. King Edward soon returned from his expedition to Flanders and took charge of matters in Scotland and gained revenge at the Battle of Falkirk the next summer.

In 1299 Folville helped defend Edinburgh Castle and was again summoned in June 1301 to join the King in his two-pronged attack which aimed to capture the whole of Scotland.

Folville served as MP for Rutland in 1298 and 1301 and as MP for Leicestershire from 1300 to 1306. In 1304 he was accused of breaking into the home of William Hubert of Teigh and carrying away charters and muniments but appears to have been excused as in 1306 he was appointed as a commissioner to enquire into progress on the building of a prison in Leicester. In December 1309 he was appointed as a Justice of Leicestershire to receive complaints of violations of the Statute of Stamford.

Folville died in 1310 and an inquisition held found that he owned Ashby Folville for the service of two Knight's fees.

Folville's wife Alice outlived him but found herself in trouble when she was imprisoned in Lincoln prison in September 1332, perhaps in relation to some of her sons' activities.

== Family ==
Folville married Alice and they had the following issue;

- Sir John Folville (1286–1327), Knight of the Shire of Leicester 1324. Ancestor of the Woodford and Smith families who later held the manor of Ashby. He married Mabel de la Mare, daughter and heir of Geoffrey de la Mare of Ashby Mares, Northamptonshire.
- Eustace Folville (d. 1346), credited with killing Roger de Beler in 1326 and being leader of the Folville Gang
- Richard Folville (d. 1341), Vicar of Teigh. Member of the Folville Gang credited with the kidnapping and ransom of Richard de Willoughby in 1332. Beheaded outside his church after a fire-fight.
- Walter Folville
- Robert Folville
- Laurence Folville
- Thomas Folville

All of the sons were at some time involved in rustling, kidnapping or vigilantism and were collectively known as "The Folville Gang" although they often acted independently of one another.

== Bibliography ==
- Farnham, George (1919–20). Leicestershire Manors: The Manors of Allexton, Appleby and Ashby Folville (PDF). Leicester: Leicestershire Archaeological and Historical Society.
- Lewis, David J. (2022). The Folvilles of Ashby Folville. London: Society of Genealogists, Genealogists' Magazine, vol.34.4, pp.169-177.
- Calendar of Inquisitions Post Mortem. Vol. V. London: HMSO. 1908.
- Hoskins, W.G. (1964). A History of the County of Leicestershire: Gartree Hundred. Vol. V. London: Boydell and Brewer.
- Moor, Charles (1929). The Knights of Edward I. London: Harleian Society.
- Nichols, John (1795). The History and Antiquities of the County of Leicester. Leicester: John Nichols.
- Page, William (1935). A History of the County of Rutland. London: Victoria County History.
- Close Rolls. Westminster: Parliament of England. 1224–1468.
- Patent Rolls. Westminster: Parliament of England. 1232–1509.
- Members of Parliament 1213-1702. London: Public Record Office. 1878.
- Parliamentary Writs. Vol. I. London: Public Record Office. 1827.
- Parliamentary Writs Alphabetical Digest. Vol. II. London: Public Record Office. 1834.
- Redlich, E.Basil (1926). The History Of Teigh In Rutland. Shipston on Stour: Kingstone Press.
- Scott, Ronald McNair (1982). Robert the Bruce King of Scots. London: Hutchinson & Co.
