= William Trussell =

14th-century English administrator and landowner

Sir William Trussell
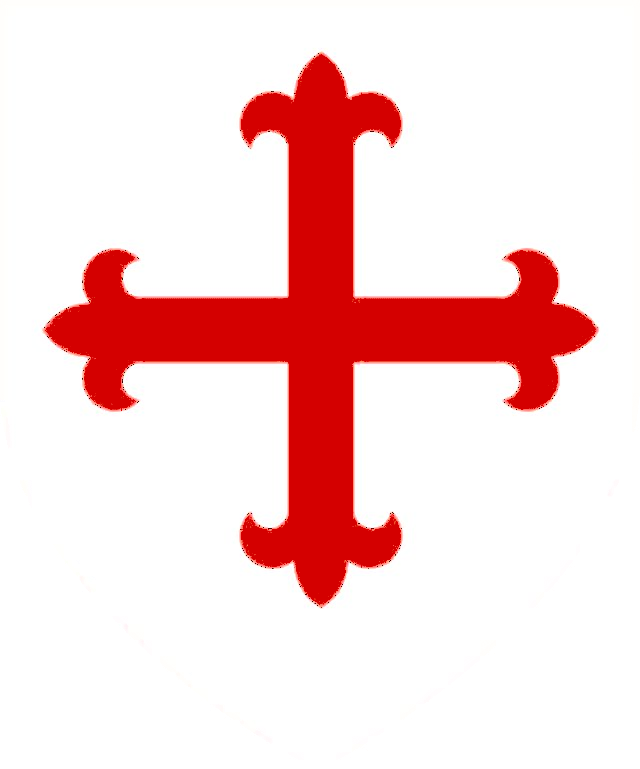
- Arms William Trussell bore at Boroughbridge: argent, a cross fleury gules

King's Secretary
- In office 1327–1347
- Monarch: Edward III

Procurator of the House of Commons
- In office 7 January 1327 – 28 April 1343
- Monarchs: Edward II; Edward III

Sheriff of Warwickshire and Leicestershire
- In office 1314–1315
- Monarch: Edward II

Member of Parliament for Northamptonshire
- In office 6 May 1319 – 25 May 1319
- Monarch: Edward II

Member of Parliament for Leicestershire
- In office 9 September 1314 – 28 September 1314
- Monarch: Edward II

Personal details
- Died: 1347
- Children: William Trussell

Sir William Trussell was an English politician and leading rebel in Queen Isabella and Roger Mortimer, 1st Earl of March's rebellion against Edward II. William acted as Speaker of the House of Commons and renounced the allegiance of England to Edward II, forcing his abdication, and became King Edward III's Secretary.

== Early life ==
Trussell was born the son of William Trussell of Billesley, Warwickshire.

Trussell was Sheriff of Warwickshire and Leicestershire for 1314–15 and represented Leicestershire in Parliament in 1314 and Northamptonshire in 1319. He was an ardent supporter of the House of Lancaster but was pardoned for his role in the death of Piers Gaveston in 1318.

== Opposition to Edward II ==
As Edward II slowly regained power from the Ordainers he rewarded Hugh le Despenser, 1st Earl of Winchester with land confiscated from the barons, leading to a baronial revolt, which Trussell joined. On 12 March 1322 a warrant for Trussell's arrest was issued describing him as "the King's enemy". Four days later both Trussell and his son fought on the rebels' side at the Battle of Boroughbridge. Edward and Despenser won, beheading the rebels' leader Thomas, 2nd Earl of Lancaster (Edward's cousin) and forcing others into exile. As the injustices continued, and the effects of the Great Famine of 1315–22 lingered, discontent remained. Despenser was rewarded with lands that had belonged to Thomas, Earl of Lancaster, including those in Leicestershire.

Trussell led a band of rebels that allegedly pillaged Despenser's estate at Loughborough in May 1322 but was imprisoned at Scarborough Castle in July. He escaped and allegedly fled south causing great havoc in Somerset and Dorset in August. On 14 March 1323, Roger de Beler, Richard de Willoughby and William de Gosefeld were issued with arrest warrants for Trussell, his son William, his brother Ralph, Roger la Zouch (son of Sir Roger la Zouch, Lord of Lubbesthorpe), Robert de Holland, 1st Baron Holand (Note: married to Maud, daughter of Alan la Zouch, Baron la Zouch of Ashby) and others who were accused (Note: both Despensers were viewed as corrupt and used blackmail and extortion to extract wealth from people so many of the accusations they made about their rivals may have been fabricated) by Despenser of stealing horses, oxen, pigs, sheep and swans from his parks in Leicestershire. The warrant was reissued in 1324 alongside similar ones that dealt with alleged rioting against Despenser in Warwickshire, Staffordshire, and Worcestershire by other rebels.

Trussell fled to France and was not named as an accomplice of Zouch and the Folville Gang when they murdered/executed de Beler in January 1326, presumably in revenge for his enforcement on behalf of Despenser. Willoughby was later kidnapped and ransomed by them in 1332.

== Support of Edward III ==
Trussell then joined up with Queen Isabella and Mortimer in Paris before moving to Flanders where he was allegedly tasked with helping to build an invasion army by William I, Count of Hainaut. Trussell accompanied Isabella and Mortimer when they landed in England on 24 September 1326 at the start of their invasion of England. Their forces consisted of approximately 1500 soldiers, many of whom were Flemish mercenaries and others exiled Contrariants. Opposition was almost non-existent and so many barons, sheriffs and knights joined the rebellion that control of the country was secured within two months. Adam, Abbot of Glastonbury hid Despenser and the Lord Chancellor, Robert Baldock in Glastonbury Abbey, and in December 1326 Trussell was ordered to bring the abbot before the next Parliament. Both Despenser and his son Hugh Despenser the Younger were captured and Trussell oversaw the trial of the elder Despenser where he was denounced and sentenced to death. Both Despensers were gruesomely executed.

Trussell was appointed Speaker of the House of Commons and, acting as procurator of the whole Parliament, renounced allegiance to Edward II on 21 January 1327. Edward III was crowned as king on 1 February 1327 and Trussell went on to become the new king's Secretary and undertook numerous diplomatic missions, particularly to France and Spain.

Trussell was buried in St Michael's chapel in Westminster Abbey in 1347.

== Family ==
Trussell married Maud, the daughter of Warin Mainwaring and they had at least three sons and a daughter.

- John, who inherited his estates.
- William, who was Constable of Odiham Castle for over 25 years and Treasurer of the Chamber from 1333 to 1335.
- Warin
- Isabelle, who married John de St Pierre.

After Trussell's death, his widow married Oliver de Bordeaux.
