= St Mary's Church, Ashby Folville =

Church in Ashby Folville, Leicestershire

Coordinates: 52°42′04″N 0°57′20″W

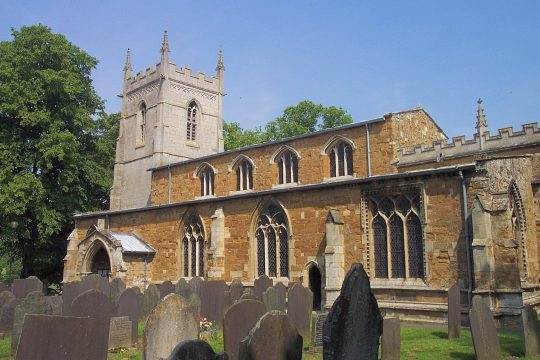
- St Mary's Church, Ashby Folville
- Denomination: Church of England

History
- Dedication: St Mary

Administration
- Diocese: Leicester
- Archdeaconry: Leicester
- Parish: Ashby Folville, Leicestershire

Clergy
- Rector: Neil Stothers

St Mary's Church is a church in Ashby Folville, Leicestershire. It is a Grade I listed building.

== History ==
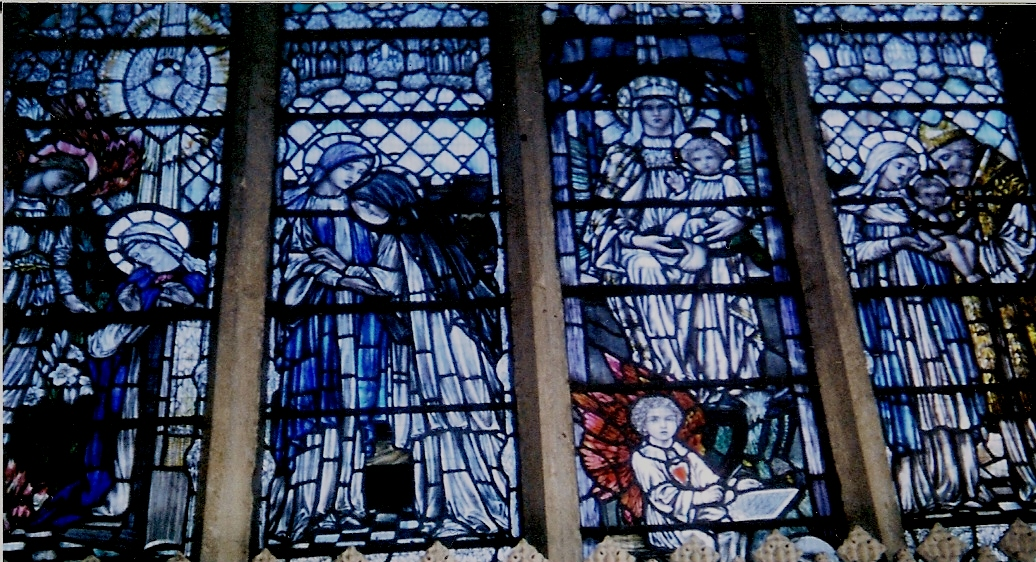
East window

The church was founded in 1220 by Maud Bassett (died 1222), who is buried in the chancel. The first patrons were Launde Priory who were presented the church. The only remaining part of the earlier church is the Norman font.

The church is mainly built of ironstone though the chancel, tower and battlement frieze are made of grey ashlar. The north and south aisles were built in the 14th century and the nave roof and tower were built the following century.

The north wall at the west end of the church has an oil painting showing the lower part of the chancel screens (which now stand at the entrance to the belfry), and the old pulpit. The belfry has 8 bells, the oldest dating back to 1637. 5 of the bells were recast in 1901, and two new ones were added.

Several of the stained glass windows show they have some connection to the Smith-Carington family. The belfry's west window commemorates the marriage of Herbert Hanbury Smith-Carington and Elizabeth Prince Stallard. It shows a Folville knight with Edward II, and was erected in 1876 after an earlier one went missing.
