= Kirby Bellars Priory =

- Saint Peter's Parish Church Kirby Bellars
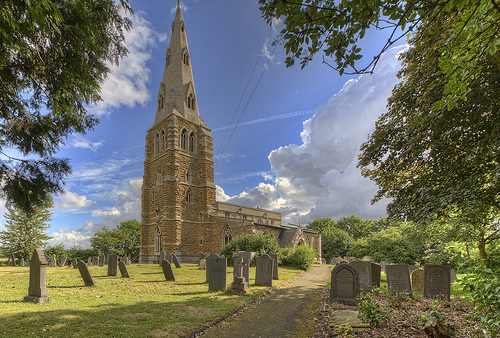
- A view of the tower
- Kirby Bellars Priory
- OS grid reference: SK 71761 18374
- Country: England
- Denomination: Anglican

History
- Founded: Circa eleventh century

Architecture
- Functional status: Active

Administration
- Province: Canterbury
- Diocese: Leicester
- Benefice: Upper Wreak

Clergy
- Priest: Canon Michael Britton

The Priory of Saint Peter Kirkby upon the Wreak
- Location within Leicestershire

Monastery information
- Other name: Kirkby Bellairs Priory
- Order: Augustinian Canons Regular
- Established: 1319-1359
- Disestablished: 1536
- Dedication: Saint Peter
- Diocese: Diocese of Lincoln
- Controlled churches: Saint John the Baptist Buckminster; All Saints Clipston (until 1363); Saint Mary's Garthorp; Saint Mary Magdalene's Stapleford; Saint Andrew's Twyford

People
- Founder: Sir Roger Beler

Site
- Location: Leicestershire, England
- Coordinates: 52.758245°N 0.93807°W
- Visible remains: The Parish Church of Saint Peter was formally the Priory Church. There are some earthworks to the north of the churchyard where the priory house once stood.
- Public access: There is a contact for a key in the church porch. The earthworks can be found nearby.

Kirby Bellars Priory was a small priory of Canons Regular of Saint Augustine in Leicestershire, England. It is now the Church of England Parish Church of Saint Peter's serving the village of Kirby Bellars.

== Origins ==
Some of the present parish church of Saint Peter's had been constructed during the 1200s for the village at that time called Chirchebi. In 1316 Roger de Beler granted lands to support a pair of chaplains to say daily Requiem Masses in a private chantry chapel, also dedicated to Saint Peter, at Kirby Bellars Mannor House for the souls of himself, his wife Alice, his parents William and Amicia, and all his ancestors. One of the chaplains was also responsible for saying Mass in a second chantry and Lady Chapel located in the north and south aisles of the Parish Church. In 1319 the establishment was expanded to a college of secular canons comprising a warden and twelve chaplains, and Beler added the holding of Buckminster Mannor as well as lands in to the north and south of Kirby parish church and other places for the upkeep of the community. The Chantry Chaplains were also responsible for offering Masses in the Parish Church Saint Peter's which was subordinated to their control on 2 September 1319. Given the size of St Peters and the evidence of large scale buildings adjacent Northern field it is likely that after 1359 it became the Priory church too although there is some dispute about this. After Rogers Murder by his cousin in 1326 the college experienced a time of disruption and instability among the chaplains.

=== Wardens of the college ===
- William Spigurnel, first warden, occurs 1319.
- John Cosyn.
- John of Kirby, died 1338.
- Edmund of Coston, presented 1338, died 1359.
- Roger Wiseman, presented and removed, 1359.

== Augustinian priory ==
In 1359 the college of secular clergy was transformed into a priory of Augustinian canons, with a prior and twelve canons. The reformed community, inspired by the sixth century Rule of Saint Augustine, were obliged by their new vows to remain stable at the priory rather than seeking positions elsewhere as before. The canons had a mixed vocation of prayer, pastoral care and work to maintain the communities building and assets. Their life revolved around the singing of the 8 daily prayer services as well as a Conventual Mass. The de Beler family continued to be the secular patrons of the community and chose to be buried in the priory church.

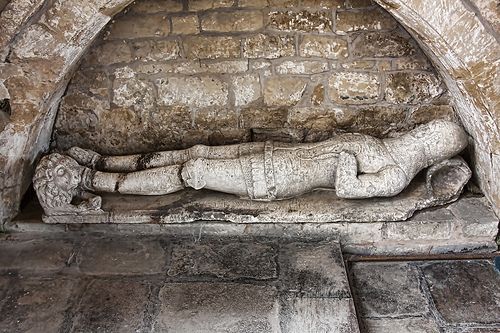
Sir Roger de Beller's 1326 Alabaster effigy in St Peters Priory Church

In 1363 the canons transferred control of All Saints Clipston in Northamptonshire to the Knights Hospitalers in exchange for the much closer parish of Saint John the Baptist Buckminster. In 1392 a royal license granted Kirby Ballars control of the parish of Saint Mary's, Garthorpe and in 1412 the parish of Saint Andrews, Twyford.

=== The Visitation Report of 1440 ===
On 26 November 1440 the priory was visited by William Alnwick, Bishop of Lincoln. He found the standards kept there satisfactory, correcting only minor faults of dress and some mistakes in the church services. The members of the community comprised:

- Henry Dalby, prior.
- William Wylingtone, sub-prior.
- John Knyvet, canon, aged 54.
- William Burtone, canon, aged 40.
- William Shepeshede.
- Robert Halifax.
- Robert Kyrkeby.
- Richard Seusterne.
- John Pakyngtone.
- William Leycestre.
- Thomas Buckmynstre.
- William Cusyngtone.
- John Chippenham, canon, aged 44.

=== The fire and recovery ===
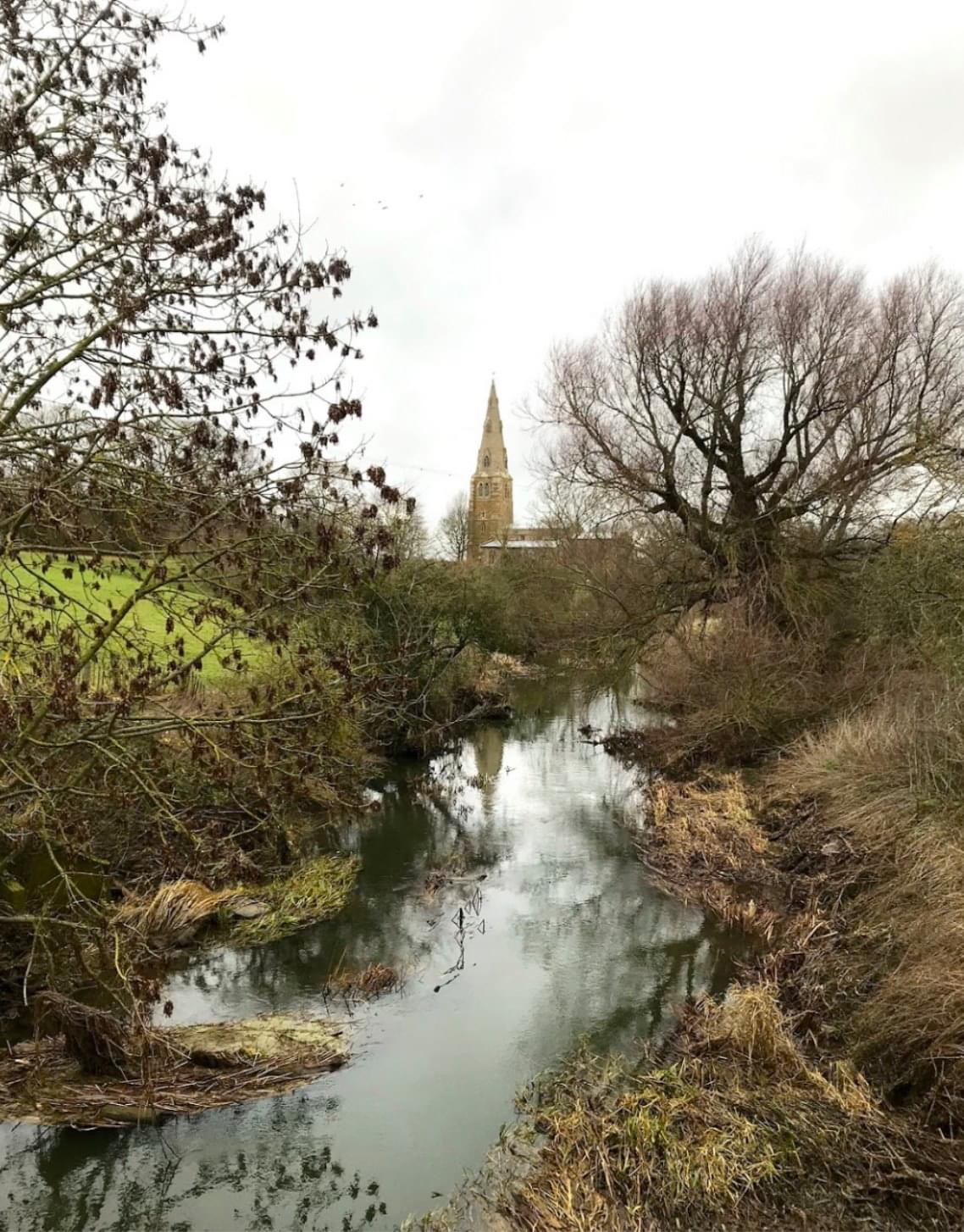
The Priory Church from the River Wreak

Sometime in the early 1500s the Priory was struck by fire which left many of its domestic buildings in ruins. In 1511 the prior and convent were authorized to give indulgences for donations to the rebuilding fund.

A visitation record from Bishop of Lincoln's Commissary from 1518 suggested many of the buildings still needed repair at that time. The same report uncovered the scandal that the sub-prior had private property, that two of the canons were suspected of immorality, and that food provided for the canons was too luxurious. Another visitation report survives from 1528 and in 1535 the priory's annual revenue was recorded as a comparatively modest £140. That assessment comes the royal visitation report issued a year before the dissolution of Kirby Bellars by which time the domestic buildings were recorded as being in good order.

=== The arms and seal of the Priory of Saint Peter Kirkby upon the Wreak ===
In 1954 there were two fourteenth century seals of Kirby Bellars known to have survived. Both are the common oval variety known as Vescias. The larger of the two (63/38mm), the seal of the community, shows Saint Peter, wearing a Mitre and seated on a canopied throne. The Saints right hand is raised in blessing and he holds the keys in his left. In the lower part of the seal is a shield bearing the arms of Sir Roger Beler. The inscription reads: "S' ECCLESIE BEATI P . . . KIRKEBI SUPER WRETHEK" (or "THE HOLY CHURCH OF BLESSED PETER AT KIRKBY UPON THE WREAK"). The smaller one (35/25mm), the seal of the prior, shows a standing figure holding a staff and book, with the inscription: "SIGILLUM PRIORIS Delaware KIRKEBI" (or "THE PRIOR OF KIRKBY")

=== Priors of Kirkby upon the Wreak ===
- Roger of Cotes, appointed 1359.
- Alexander Thurgarton, occurs 1416, died 1418 or 1419.
- Henry Dalby, elected 1419, occurs to 1444.
- William Leicester, resigned 1461.
- William Burton, elected 1461, died 1480.
- William Kirby, elected 1480, died 1488.
- Richard Sewstern, elected 1488, died 1526.
- Thomas Kirby, elected 1526.
- William Kyrkeby, last prior, occurs 1534 and 1535.

== Dissolution ==
The priory was dissolved in 1536 along with other small religious houses as part of the first wave of the dissolution of the monasteries.

== Gallery ==
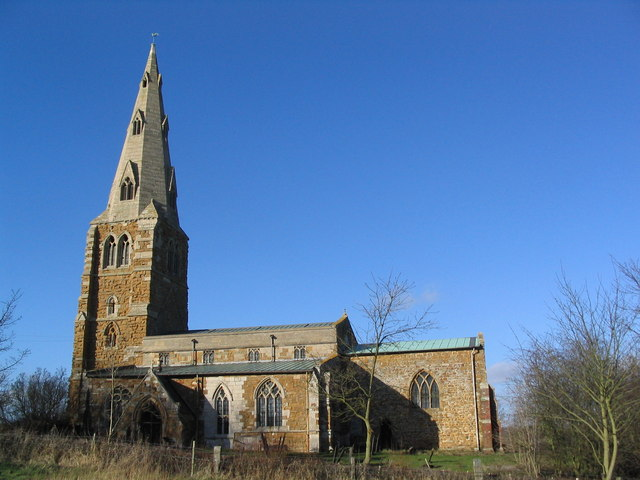
The south elevation.

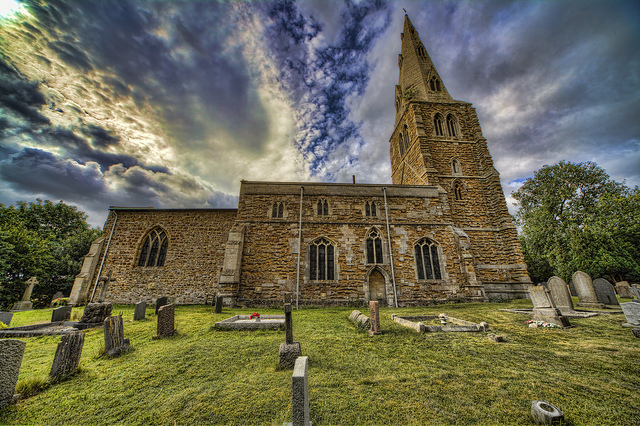
The north elevation and site of the demolished north aisle.

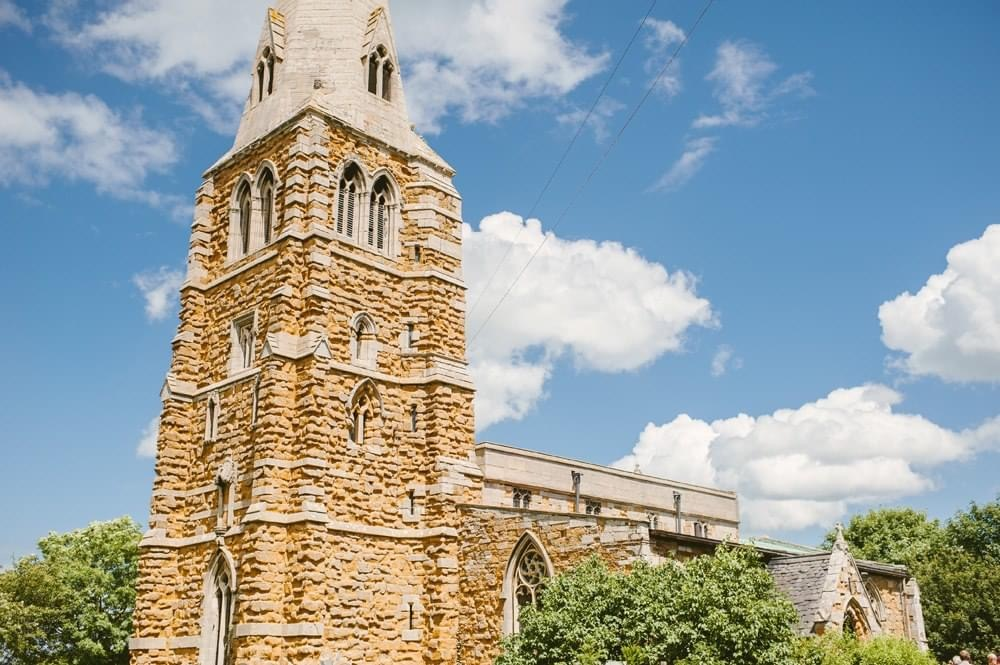
The bell tower, note the niches on the west side for statues of saints.

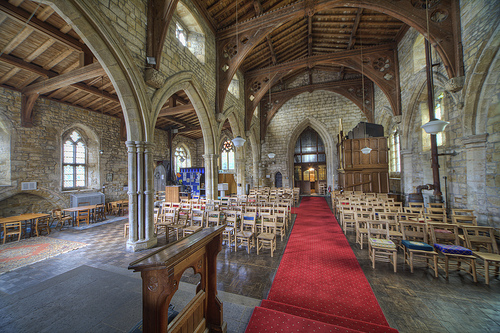
The nave looking west

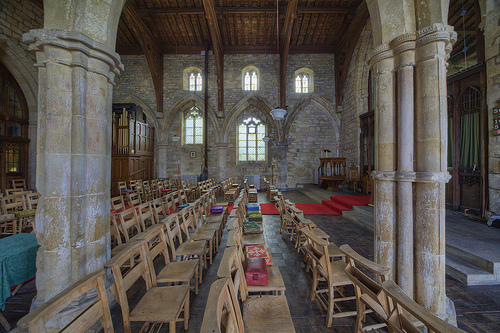
The blocked off north aisle from the south aisle.

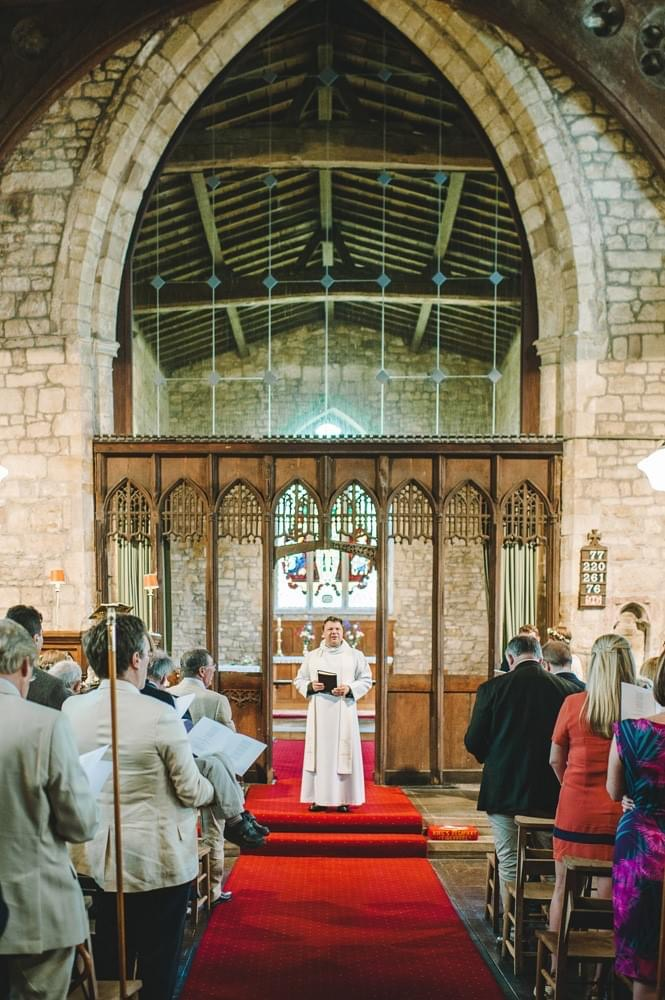
Sanctuary and rood screen with congregation

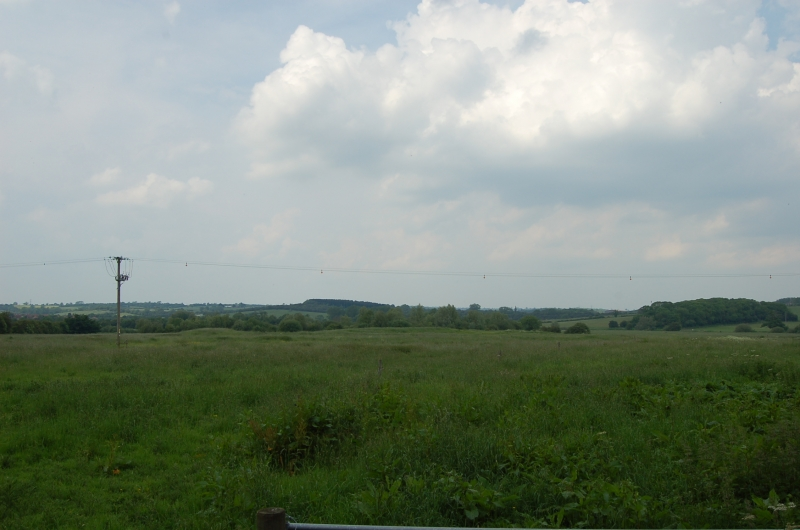
The field to the north of Saint Peter's Church, the site of the domestic buildings of the Priory. There are two large parallel dug out earthworks in the middle of the field which putatively form the remains of a moated convent.

== See also ==
- List of monastic houses in Leicestershire
- List of English abbeys, priories and friaries serving as parish churches
