= Roger de Beler =

13th and 14th-century English judge and royal official

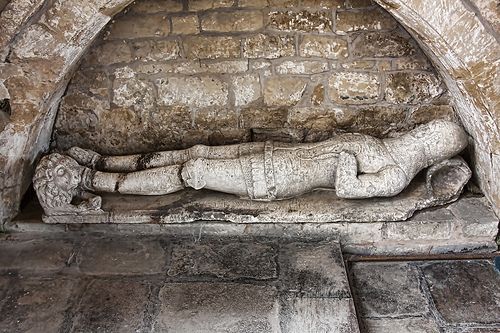
Sir Roger de Beller's 1326 Alabaster effigy in St Peters Church, Kirby Bellars

Roger Beler was a Baron of the Exchequer and right-hand man of Hugh le Despencer and King Edward II. Beler was killed by the Folville gang in 1326.

== Ancestry ==
Beler was the son of William Beler, and grandson of Roger Beler, sheriff of Lincolnshire in 1256. His mother's name was Amicia. A licence obtained in 1316 by Beler allowed him to grant a lay fee in Kirkby-by-Melton, on the Wrethek in Leicestershire, for a warden and two chantry chaplains for the Parish Church of St. Peter, on condition of their performing religious services for the benefit of the souls of himself and his wife Alicia, his father and mother, and other ancestors in a special chantry chapel on the manorial site. In time this secular chantry college took on the Rule of St Augustine and became the Saint Peter's Priory Kirkby upon the Wreak. Beler is generally credited as the founder of this community and is usually cited as the source for the modern name of the village of Kirby Bellars.

== Career ==
In the civil dissensions over Piers Gaveston, Beler was of the Earl of Lancaster's party, and in October 1318 was included in the amnesty then granted to the earl and his adherents. Shortly afterwards, Beler received a grant of land in Leicestershire as the reward for services for the king. In the same year the offices of bailiff and steward of Stapleford, in Leicestershire, of which apparently he was already the tenant, were entailed upon him. In December 1318 he was one of a commission for the trial of sheriffs and other officers accused of oppression in the counties of Buckingham, Bedford, and Northampton.

In 1322 Beler was created baron of the exchequer in the room of John de Foxle, and placed on a special commission to try certain those who had allegedly broken into and pillaged manors belonging to Hugh le Despenser, and upon another commission for the same purpose in the following year. In July 1323 he was one of the justices appointed to investigate the conduct of sheriffs, collectors and bailiffs in Northamptonshire and Rutland. In 1324 he sat on a commission for the trial of persons charged with complicity in a riot at Rochester.

Beler was summoned as a justice to Parliaments at Westminster in January 1324 and November 1325.

== Death ==
On 29 January 1326, while on his way from Kirkby to Leicester, Beler was killed in a valley near Rearsby by his distant cousin Eustace Folville to whom he had previously made threats of violence. Roger la Zouch, Lord of Lubbesthorpe was named as the instigator of the murder and accessories included two of his sons, Ivo/Eudo la Zouch, the eldest son William la Zouche, 1st Baron Zouche of Harringworth and Robert de Hellewell one of William's retainers pointing to it having a political element linked to the approaching rebellion against the Despencers and Edward II. (Note: the la Zouches had been previously involved in raids against the Despencers alongside the leading Contrariant William Trussell and were linked to the families of Roger Mortimer, Maurice de Berkeley, 2nd Baron Berkeley and Robert de Holland, 1st Baron Holand by marriage.) Folville and his gang fled to Paris, and their lands were confiscated.

Folville and his followers returned to England perhaps in Queen Isabella's invasion in September 1326. After the Despencers' executions and Edward II's abdication in early 1327, Folville and his band were pardoned, and became celebrated, although they were to flirt with outlawry and vigilantism for many years.

Beler's killing had not been an isolated attack on an official of the Despencer/Edward regime in the run-up to the 1326 invasion; in July 1325 the deputy of the keeper of confiscated Contrariant castles in the Welsh Marches was brutally attacked and had his eyes torn out and limbs broken and in October the Constable of Conisborough Castle, which held imprisoned Contrariants, was besieged in its church.

Sir Roger was buried in the parish church of Saint Peter at Kirby where his alabaster effigy survives to this day.

== Family ==
Alicia survived her husband by nearly 20 years, dying in 1344. Beler's heir was Roger, who, being an infant, became a ward of the crown. Alicia was placed in possession of the estates in Leicestershire during her son's minority. The elder Beler was buried at Kirkby in the church of St. Peter, where a monument in alabaster, representing him as a knight in complete armour, was extant at the date of publication of Nichols's History of Leicestershire in 1795.

== Sources ==
- Fryde, Natalie (1979). The Tyranny and Fall of Edward II 1321–1326. Cambridge: Cambridge University Press. ISBN 978-0-521-22201-3.
- Lumley, Joseph (1895). Chronicon Henry Knighton. Vol. I. London: HMSO.
- Nichols, John (1795). The History and Antiquities of the County of Leicester. Vol. II pt.I. Leicester: John Nichols.
- Close Rolls. Westminster: Parliament of England. 1224–1468.
- Fine Rolls. Westminster: Parliament of England. 1199–1461.
- Patent Rolls. Westminster: Parliament of England. 1232–1509.
- Parliamentary Writs Alphabetical Digest. Vol. II. London: Public Record Office. 1834.

=== Attribution ===
This article incorporates text from a publication now in the public domain: "Beler, Roger de". Dictionary of National Biography. London: Smith, Elder & Co. 1885–1900.
