= Folleville =

Folleville may refer to several communes in France:

- Folleville, Eure, in the Eure département
- Folleville, Somme, in the Somme département
