= Anthony Musson =

Anthony Musson is professor of legal history at the University of Exeter. Musson is a barrister of the Middle Temple and a fellow of the Royal Historical Society and the Society of Antiquaries of London.

== Selected publications ==
- From the Judge's Arbitrium to the Legality Principle, Berlin, Duncker & Humblot, 2013.
- Making Legal History: Approaches and Methodologies, Cambridge, Cambridge University Press, 2012. (with C. Stebbings)
- Medieval Petitions: Grace and Grievance, Woodbridge, York Medieval Press, 2009. (with W.M. Ormrod & G. Dodd)
- Crime, Law and Society in the Later Middle Ages, Manchester, Manchester University Press, 2009. (with E. Powell)
- The Reign of Edward II: New Perspectives, Woodbridge, York Medieval Press, 2006. (with Gwilym Dodd)
- Boundaries of the Law: Geography, Gender and Jurisdiction in Medieval and Early Modern Europe, Aldershot, Ashgate Publishing, 2005.
- Medieval Law in Context: The Growth of Legal Consciousness from Magna Carta to the Peasants' Revolt, Manchester University Press, 2001.
- Expectations of Law in the Middle Ages, Woodbridge, Boydell, 2001.
