= Barbara Hanawalt =

American historian and author (born 1941)

Barbara Ann Hanawalt (born 4 March 1941) is an American historian and bestselling author. She specializes in English medieval social history.

== Life ==
Hanawalt was born in New Brunswick, New Jersey. Her father was a university professor and her mother was a schoolteacher.

== Career ==
Hanawalt received her bachelor's degree from Douglass College in 1963, a master's degree from the University of Michigan in 1964, and a Ph.D., also from the University of Michigan, in 1970.

Hanawalt taught for a number of years at Indiana University and the University of Minnesota. She then moved to Ohio State University as the King George III Chair of British History in 1999.

== Awards ==
Hanawalt was named fellow of the Royal Historical Society and of the Wissenschaftskolleg zu Berlin and the Center for Advanced Studies at Princeton University.

== Bibliography ==
Some of Hanawalt's notable books are:

- The Middle Ages: An Illustrated History
- The Ties That Bound: Peasant Families in Medieval England
- The European World, 400-1450
- Growing Up in Medieval London: The Experience of Childhood in History
- The Wealth of Wives: Women, Law, and Economy in Late Medieval London
- Of Good and Ill Repute: Gender and Social Control in Medieval England
- Crime and Conflict in English Communities, 1300–1348
