= Fowlerville =

Fowlerville may refer to:

- Fowlerville, Michigan, a village in Livingston County, Michigan, United States
- Fowlerville, Erie County, New York, a hamlet in Erie County, New York, United States
- Fowlerville, Livingston County, New York, a hamlet and census-designated place in Livingston County, New York, United States
- Fowlerville, Sullivan County, New York, a hamlet in Sullivan County, New York, United States
- Fowlersville, New York, a similarly named hamlet in Lewis County, New York, United States
- Fowlersville, Pennsylvania, a similarly named place in Columbia County, Pennsylvania, United States
