= Ashby Folville Manor =

Gaddesby, Melton, Leicestershire, LE14

Coordinates: 52.6997°N 0.9544°W

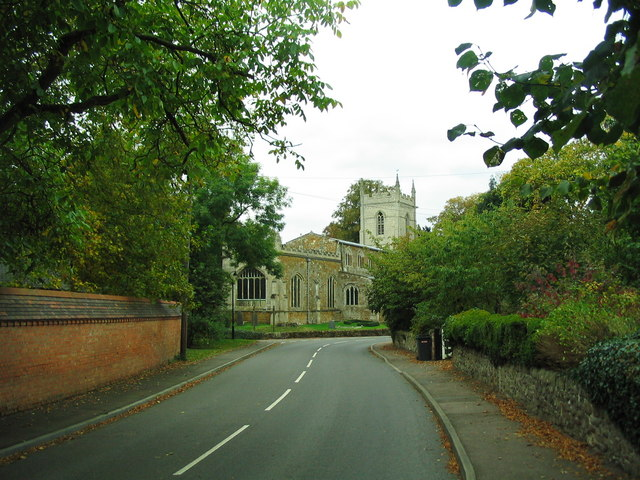
- Folville Street, looking to the Church of St Mary, Ashby Folville The estate boundary wall of Ashby Folville Manor is on the left.
- Interactive map of the Ashby Folville Manor area

General information
- Type: House
- Architectural style: Neo-Tudor
- Location: Ashby Folville, United Kingdom
- Current tenants: Leicester property developer Jamie Lewis
- Completed: Late 19th-century
- Renovated: 1891-1893
- Owner: Jamie Lewis

Ashby Folville Manor is a late 19th-century house in Neo-Tudor style in the village of Ashby Folville, Leicestershire. The house was substantially rebuilt in 1891-1893 by the architect John Ely of Manchester after a fire.

A camp for displaced people from Poland was established in a former US Army base in the grounds after World War II. The resettlement camp was occupied from 1948 until 1965.

From 2004 - 2016 it was the home of Rosemary Conley.

== Notes and references ==
=== Sources ===
- Pevsner, Nikolaus (1960). The Buildings of England: Leicestershire and Rutland (Harmondsworth: Penguin Books)
