= Richard Folville =

14th-century English criminal gang member

Richard Folville (died 1340 or 1341) was a member of the infamous Folville Gang captained by his older brother Eustace.

== Biography ==
Richard was the fourth of 7 sons born to Sir John Folville (died 1310) of Ashby Folville, Leicestershire. In 1321, he was created rector to the small country parish of Teigh, about 12 km east of Melton Mowbray. A warrant for Folville's arrest was issued in March 1326 for his part in connection with the assassination of Sir Roger Bellere, and he was also involved in much of his siblings' later strifes.

Folville seems to have masterminded the abduction and ransom of the justice Sir Richard Willoughby, later Chief Justice of the King's Bench. The chronicler Henry Knighton, our principal witness to the activities of the Folvilles, claims that the "savage, audacious" Richard was in charge of the socialem comitivam ('allied company') which attacked Willoughby. The kidnapping occurred in January 1332. Willoughby was seized on the road to Grantham and escorted into nearby woodland. One indictment claims that he was carried from here to numerous dens and hideouts across the county, "from wood to wood". He was eventually made to pay 1300 marks for his release and forced to swear an oath of loyalty to the Folvilles.

== Capture and death ==
Richard was the only member of the Folville gang to suffer official retribution. In either 1340 or 1341, he and some of his retinue were cornered in the church of Teigh by Sir Robert de Colville, a keeper of the King's peace. After a prolonged struggle, which resulted in at least one fatality as Richard fired arrows from the church, Sir Robert succeeded in drawing Richard from the building. Once in custody, Folville was summarily beheaded, in his own churchyard. After the event Pope Clement VI instructed Thomas Bek, Bishop of Lincoln, to absolve Robert and his men for killing the priest, on condition that they were whipped at each of main churches in the area, by way of penance. This is clearly reminiscent of Henry II's penance before the cathedral of Avranches, after the death of Thomas Becket.

== Notes ==
=== Works cited ===
- Patent Rolls. Westminster: Parliament of England. 1232–1509.
