= Kirby Bellars =

Village in Leicestershire, England

Coordinates: 52.7506°N 0.9402°W

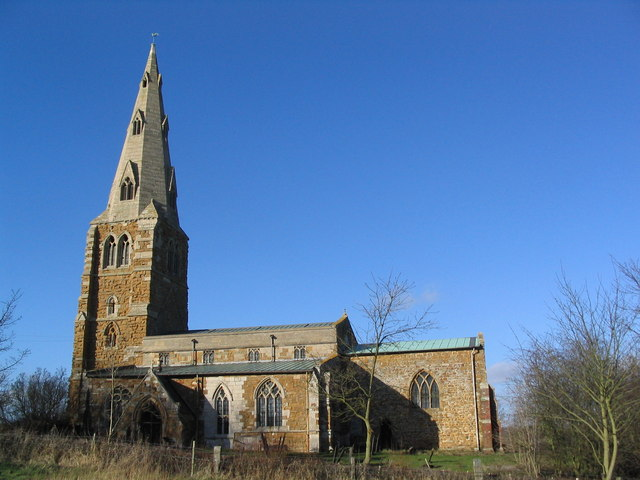
- The Church of St Peter

- Location within Leicestershire
- Population: 369 (2011)
- OS grid reference: SK716176
- District: Melton
- Shire county: Leicestershire
- Region: East Midlands
- Country: England
- Sovereign state: United Kingdom
- Post town: MELTON MOWBRAY
- Postcode district: LE14
- Dialling code: 01664
- Police: Leicestershire
- Fire: Leicestershire
- Ambulance: East Midlands
- UK Parliament: Melton and Syston

Kirby Bellars is a village and civil parish near Melton Mowbray in Leicestershire, England. The population of the civil parish at the 2011 census was 369.

== History ==
The village is recorded in the Domesday Book under the name of Chirchebi. The name Bellars probably originates from Roger de Beler who owned the manor house and founded the priory in 1316.

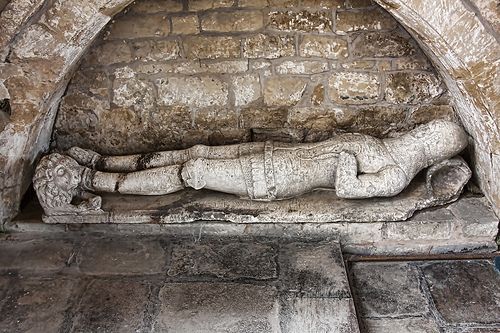
Sir Roger de Beller's 1326 Alabaster effigy in St Peters Priory Church

The large and ancient Parish Church of Saint Peter's, was built in the 13th century and developed by the Priory in the 14th, 15th and 16th centuries, probably as their own chapel. It is made of ironstone and has a tall spire. It is now a Grade I listed building.

John Marius Wilson's Imperial Gazetteer of England and Wales (1870-1872) said of Kirby Bellars:

KIRBY-BELLARS, a parish, with a pleasant village, in Melton-Mowbray district, Leicester; on the river Wreak, and on the Syston and Peterborough railway, at Ashfordby r. station, 2¾ miles WSW of Melton-Mowbray. Post town, Melton-Mowbray. Acres, 2,590. Real property, £5,060. Pop., 243. Houses, 52. The manor belongs to the Rev. E. Manners. Kirby Park was a hunting seat of Sir Francis Burdett, Bart.; and is now occupied by a farmer. A college, for a warden and twelve priests, was founded in the parish, by Roger de Beler, in 1319; and was converted into an Augustinian priory, by Alice Beller, in 1359. Fossil bones of elephants and other animals were found in 1821. The parish is a meet for the Quorndon hounds. The living is a p. curacy in the diocese of Peterborough. Value, £88. Patron, Sir Robert Burdett, Bart. The church is handsome; and has a tower, with lofty spire.

== Present day ==
Part of the district of Melton, Kirby Bellars also has its own elected parish council. The Village Hall in the Main Street, opposite to Hunters Rise, is used for many local purposes and can seat 150 people.

The pub is called 'The Flying Childers' after the undefeated 18th century racehorse.

In Gaddesby Lane are the kennels of the Quorn Hunt, which claims to be the most famous fox hunt in the United Kingdom.

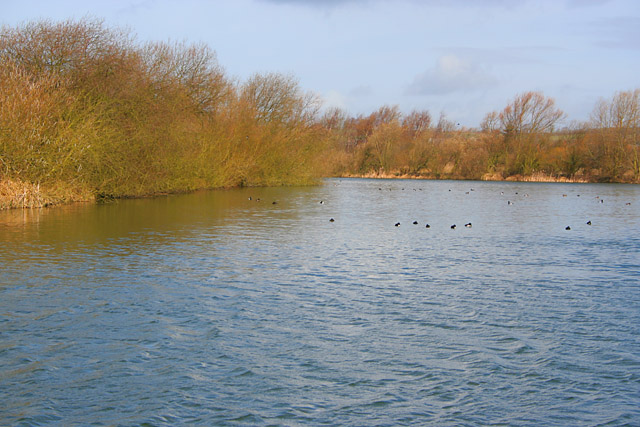
Priory Lakes

Near the village is a wetland area called Priory Lakes, where the Leicestershire Wildfowler's Association has its office.

The 'Kirby Bellars Group of Artists' has existed since the 1980s and includes professional artists as well as amateurs.
