= Roger la Zouch =

English Member of Parliament in the 14th century

Sir Roger la Zouch
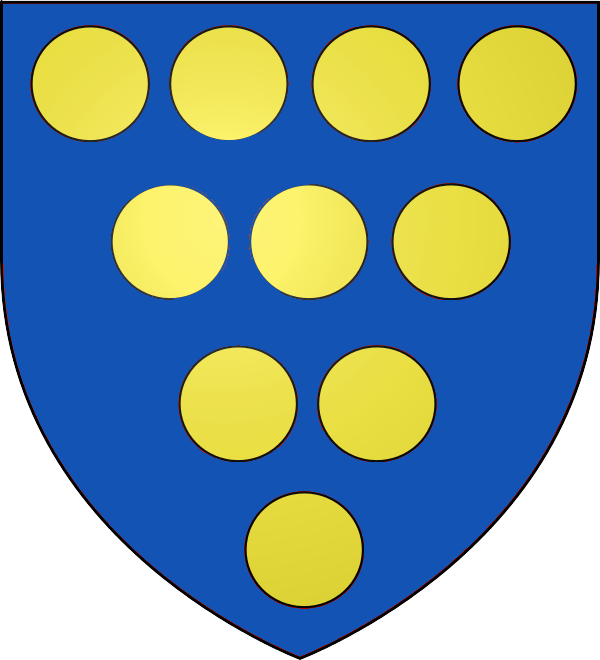
- Arms of la Zouch of Lubbesthorp: "azure, 10 bezants"

MP for Leicestershire
- In office 1324, 1331 & 1337 – 1337
- Monarch: Edward II

Sheriff of Warwickshire and Leicestershire
- In office 1330–1340
- Monarch: Edward II

Personal details
- Born: 1292
- Children: Roger la Zouch; Ralph la Zouch

Sir Roger la Zouch was the instigator of the murder of Roger de Beler and also MP for Leicestershire in 1324, 1331 and 1337 and Sheriff of Warwickshire and Leicestershire during the 1330s.

== Ancestry ==
Roger was the son of Roger la Zouch, Lord of Lubbesthorpe (d.1303), the younger brother of William la Zouche, 1st Baron Zouche of Harringworth. He was the grandson of Eudo la Zouch and Millicent, daughter of William III de Cantilupe, a close friend of Simon de Montfort, 6th Earl of Leicester.

Roger's aunt, Eva, was married to the rebel Maurice de Berkeley, 2nd Baron Berkeley who was imprisoned by the Despencers in Wallingford Castle and died there in 1326. Eva's son, Thomas de Berkeley, 3rd Baron Berkeley was entrusted with guarding the deposed Edward II in his castle but was relieved of his duty when others decided Edward was to be treated "less gentley" and died in suspicious circumstances.

== Career ==
Roger was a supporter of Thomas, Earl of Lancaster for which he received a pardon from the king in August 1318. Zouch fought at the Battle of Boroughbridge in March 1322.

In January 1324 Roger was accused of raiding Hugh Despencer the Elder's lands at Loughborough and elsewhere in Leicestershire, although in a warrant issued the previous year it had been his son Roger, jnr who had been named. The Baron of the Exchequer Roger de Beler, who was viewed as a traitor by the Contrariants, was one of those appointed to arrest la Zouch.

In 1325 Sir Roger was appointed as a Commissioner of Warwickshire and Leicestershire but was replaced in November after claiming he was detained through sickness.

On 24 March 1326 the Sheriff of Leicestershire was ordered to seize the lands of Sir Roger la Zouch, Lord of Lubbesthorpe as he had been indicted for "assenting to and counselling" the death of the Baron of the Exchequer, Roger de Beler, which had been carried out by the Folville Gang. Roger fled from Leicestershire first to Wales and then probably Paris where Mortimer and the Queen were in court and his cousin Eudo la Zouch died a month later.

== Death ==
Following Isabella and Mortimer's successful invasion of England in 1326, Edward and the Despencers were killed and pardons were issued to the men that had been accused of killing Beler.

Roger la Zouch did not immediately reappear, and in 1328 his manor of Lubbesthorp was granted to his uncle William la Zouch, Lord of Harringworth who was Roger's overlord. By 1330 a Roger la Zouch had been appointed as Sheriff of Warwickshire and Leicestershire, represented Leicestershire in Parliament in 1331 and 1337 and was again holding the manor of Lubbesthorp. Whether this was the Roger la Zouch who was exiled and returned, his son or the son of William la Zouche of Harringworth is debatable.

== Family ==
Roger had the following issue:

- Ralph la Zouch
- Roger la Zouch

Both Ralph and Roger were Contrariants that were accused of raiding Despencer's lands at Loughborough in 1323 and of helping to murder Beler.

== Bibliography ==
- Calendar of Inquisitions Post Mortem. Vol. IV. London: HMSO. 1913.
- Moor, Charles (1929). The Knights of Edward I. London: Harleian Society.
- Nichols, John (1795). The History and Antiquities of the County of Leicester. Vol. IV. Leicester: John Nichols.
- Close Rolls. Westminster: Parliament of England. 1224–1468.
- Fine Rolls. Westminster: Parliament of England. 1199–1461.
- Patent Rolls. Westminster: Parliament of England. 1232–1509.
- Members of Parliament 1213-1702. London: Public Record Office. 1878.
- Parliamentary Writs Alphabetical Digest. Vol. II. London: Public Record Office. 1834.
