= Lubbesthorpe =

Hamlet and civil parish in Blaby, Leicestershire, England

Coordinates: 52.6055°N 1.2006°W

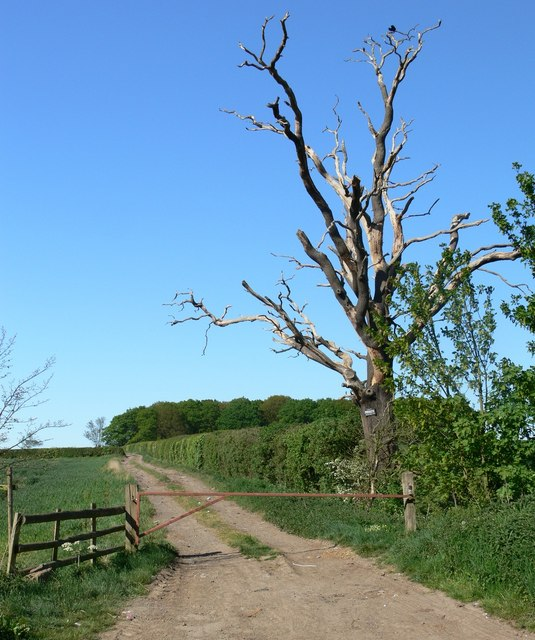
Private farm track off the Lubbesthorpe Bridle Road

Lubbesthorpe is a hamlet and parish in the district of Blaby within Enderby on the outskirts of Leicester, England, on the west side of the M1 motorway and the River Soar.

== Name ==
The name is said to mean "Lubba's Thorpe", i.e. a small settlement belonging to Lubba, an Old Danish name. It has been spelled as Lubbesthorpe.

== History ==
It was listed in the Domesday Book as a group of nine households. In 1302 there was a chantry chapel, founded by Roger la Zouch, and in about 1534 a manor house (described as "a very faire and gallant house") built by the Earl of Huntingdon. By 1810 these were both ruins and the stone was being removed for road mending. It was established as a full civil parish in 1866, with various additions and removals changing its area afterward. In 1872 the hamlet, belonging to the Duke of Rutland, had a population of 64; this rose to 118 in 1921.

== Current ==
The current houses are a little away from the medieval settlement, the remains of which are now a Scheduled Ancient Monument. (A rabbit warren here is also a Scheduled Ancient Monument.)

As at 2014 new housing estate of 4,250 homes is planned, informally known as New Lubbesthorpe.
