= Eustace Folville =

14th-century English outlaw

- Died: 1346
- Parent(s): John Folville and Alice
- Conviction: None
- Criminal charges: Murder, rustling, highway robbery, kidnapping

Details
- Victims: Roger de Beler
- Date: 1326

Eustace Folville (died 1346) was an English criminal and outlaw who is credited with assassinating the unpopular Roger de Beler, Baron of the Exchequer and henchman of the despised Hugh le Despencer and King Edward II. He was the most active member of the Folville Gang, which engaged in acts of vigilantism and outlawry in Leicestershire in the early 1300s, often on behalf of others.

== Folville family ==
Eustace was the second of seven sons of John Folville and Alice. John Folville was probably the same John Folville who was knight of the shire for both Rutland and Leicestershire between 1298 and 1306. Eustace's elder brother, also named John Folville, inherited all of his father's lands in 1309 and abstained from most (but not all) of the law-breaking of his younger brothers. More recent research shows the Folville pedigree detailed by local historian George Farnham is flawed.

== Background ==
Upon the death of the well-respected King Edward I, he was succeeded by his son Edward II, who did not inherit his father's abilities. Edward II promoted a young French knight called Piers Gaveston ahead of the existing aristocracy, and his corruption and abusive nature meant that relations between the King and his subjects soon broke down. Gaveston was exiled but returned and was murdered by Thomas, earl of Lancaster in 1312.

Gaveston was soon replaced in the affections of the king by another knight, Hugh Despenser the Younger. Despenser's greed and corruption became rampant and relations between him and the baronage disintegrated, resulting in the Despenser War of 1321–1322, led by the Marcher Lords Roger Mortimer (Note: whose grandfather Roger Mortimer, 1st Baron Mortimer had killed Hugh Despenser the Younger's grandfather, Hugh le Despencer, 1st Baron le Despencer at the Battle of Evesham in 1265, initiating a long-running feud between the two families.) and Humphrey de Bohun. This culminated in the Battle of Boroughbridge on 16 March 1322, which was won by the king and Despenser. Gaveston's killer, Thomas of Lancaster, was executed.

Many of the rebels were imprisoned, including Mortimer (who escaped to France in August 1323) and Robert de Holland, 1st Baron Holand. (Note: who was married to Maud, daughter of Alan la Zouch, Baron la Zouch of Ashby.) Others fled and engaged in outlawry; William Trussell led a rebel group that raided in Somerset and Dorset in August 1322.

As the injustices continued and the effects of the Great Famine of 1315–1322 lingered, discontent remained. Despenser and his father Hugh le Despenser were rewarded with lands that had belonged to Thomas of Lancaster, including those in Leicestershire. On 14 March 1323, Roger de Beler, Baron of the Exchequer, Richard de Willoughby, and William de Gosefeld were ordered to arrest William Trussell, his son William, Roger la Zouch, Roger's brother Ralph, Robert de Holland, and others who Hugh le Despenser accused of stealing horses, oxen, pigs, sheep, and swans from his parks in Leicestershire. The warrants were reissued in 1324 alongside similar ones that dealt with rioting against Despenser in Warwickshire, Staffordshire, and Worcestershire by other rebels.

Trussell was forced to flee to France, where he joined Mortimer and plotted revenge against the Despensers and the king. Queen Isabella joined them in 1325 and embarked upon an affair with Mortimer, having been estranged from Edward II since he had left her dangerously unprotected from the Scots in 1322.

By January 1326, English supporters of Isabella, Mortimer, and Trussell, perhaps including the Zouches, were assembling and equipping troops in preparation for an approaching invasion.

== Folville Gang ==
Roger de Beler, who was a baron of the exchequer as well as an adherent of the Despensers, on 19 January 1326 was captured and murdered by Folville, his brothers Robert and Walter, and a group of other men, including some Zouche family members. Although pardoned in early 1327, Folville and his companions continued kidnapping, robbing, and murdering. On 14 January 1332, the band of criminals led by Folville kidnapped Richard Willoughby, a royal justice, who they held for a 1300 marks ransom.

=== Rehabilitation ===
Folville was pardoned again in 1333 for his military services in Scotland. He continued to serve in military campaigns in 1337 and 1338, in Scotland and Flanders, respectively. In 1339, he became a member of the council of the Abbot of Crowland. He died in 1346, having stood trial for none of the charges lodged against him. He is buried at St Mary's church, Ashby Folville. His monument has been badly damaged: a Victorian description states that "the fragments of his helmet form the only part of his funeral achievement now remaining".

== Assessment ==
Folville faced little resistance to his crimes during his lifetime and suffered no form of legal penalty, despite being widely known as a habitual offender for two decades. During this time, he went unpunished, unlike his brother Richard. Two factors may explain Folville's apparent good fortune. Firstly, the political turbulence of the 1320s worked in his favour, particularly in the case of the murder of Beler. Beler had been closely connected to the Despensers: he was appointed attorney to Hugh Despenser the Younger in 1322, and used the revenues of confiscated lands to curry favour with the family.

Secondly, there was a widespread perception that Eustace and others like him were basically honest and forthright, at least more so than the authorities that pursued them. This would have meant that justices and their clerks, reliant as they were on testimonies from local people, found their jobs extremely difficult in Folville's home territory. As E. L. G. Stones notes, complaints along these lines were frequently made by the trailbaston and other commissions: "in all these things they are aided and abetted by local people, who incite them to their evil deeds and shield them after they are done". While these laments might seem to excuse the commissions' failures, there is undoubtedly some truth to them.

This widespread support seems to have been rooted in a sense that the Folvilles were allies of the common people, combating the crooked establishment that oppressed them. Eustace's two principal victims were corrupt individuals. Beler used his office to seize land and siphon money to his patrons, and his murder might be regarded less as a crime by the Folvilles alone and more as a conspiracy by several Leicestershire landowners. Eustace's accomplices were members of the Halewell and Zouche families, which suggests a breadth of ill-feeling against Beler, going well beyond any one group. Willoughby was no more popular. In 1340 he was targeted by a second gang, who trapped him in Thurcaston castle. He was later imprisoned by Edward III on charges of corruption, indicted by several juries across the country, and forced to pay 1200 marks for the king's pardon. Eustace was respected as an opponent of such figures, even if this opposition was not his primary motive.

== Later reputation ==
For generations after Eustace's death, the positive view of the Folville gang only increased. In later sources, they are not merely regarded as law-breakers, but agents of an unofficial law, outside human legislation and less susceptible to abuse.

In William Langland's Piers Plowman, written in the 1370s, Langland sees them as instruments of the divine order. He speaks approvingly of "Folvyles lawes". The crimes of the family are presented as correctives to the "false" legal establishment, and the "Folvyles" themselves are listed among the "tresors" that Grace has given to combat "Antecrist".

The contemporary chronicler Henry Knighton is also sympathetic. He portrays Beler and Willoughby as entirely legitimate targets: Willoughby's ransom is reduced to a less avaricious 90 marks, while Beler becomes the aggressor of his killers, not only "heaping threats and injustices" on to his neighbours but coveting their "possessions". The kidnapping of Willoughby is portrayed as a direct conflict between the two codes represented by the outlaws and the justice: Beler is abducted as punishment for trespassing on the territory of a rival order, specifically "because of the trailbaston commissions of 1331".

For his contemporaries and near-contemporaries, Folville was clearly more than an acquisitive thug. He was, according to Eric Hobsbawm, something closer to an enforcer of "God's law and the common custom, which was different from the state's or the lord's law, but nevertheless a social order".

== Bibliography ==
- Close Rolls. Westminster, UK: Parliament of England. 1224–1468.
- Lewis, David J. (2022). "The Folvilles of Ashby Folville". Genealogists' Magazine. 34 (4): 169–177.
- Patent Rolls. Westminster, UK: Parliament of England. 1232–1509.
- Summerson, Henry (2008). "Folvile, Eustace". Oxford Dictionary of National Biography. doi:10.1093/ref:odnb/49676. (subscription, Wikipedia Library access or UK public library membership required)
