= Holy Trinity Church, Teigh =

Church in Teigh, Rutland

Coordinates: 52°44′06″N 0°43′14″W

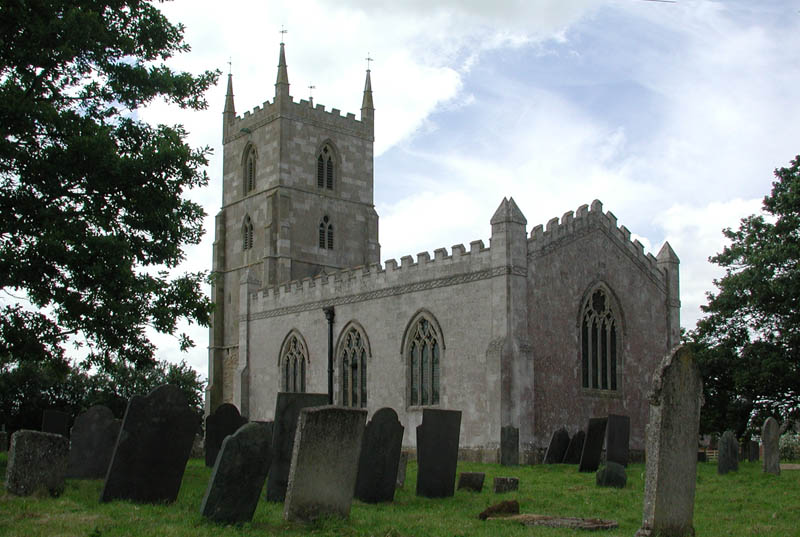
- Holy Trinity Church, Teigh
- OS grid reference: SK 86486 16012
- Denomination: Church of England

History
- Dedication: Holy Trinity

Administration
- Diocese: Peterborough
- Parish: Teigh, Rutland

Clergy
- Rector: Stephen Griffiths

Holy Trinity Church is the parish church in Teigh, Rutland. It is a Grade II* listed building.

== History ==
The current building was built in 1782, having been designed by George Richardson for Robert Sherard, 4th Earl of Harborough who was rector. An earlier church dating from the 12th century was removed except for the base of the tower.

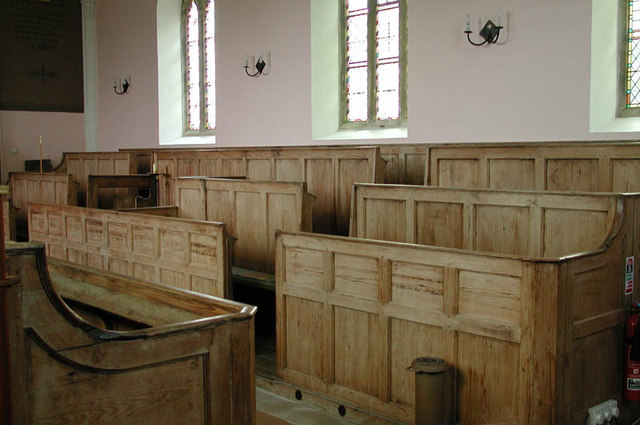
Pews

The pews face one another rather than towards the altar. The pulpit is triple-decked and is combined with the lectern and prayer desk to form an unusual structure at the western end.

Over the altar is a c1600 Flemish painting which could be the work of the Otto van Veen school. The ceiling of the church has the Sherard arms and the Sherard crest at either end.

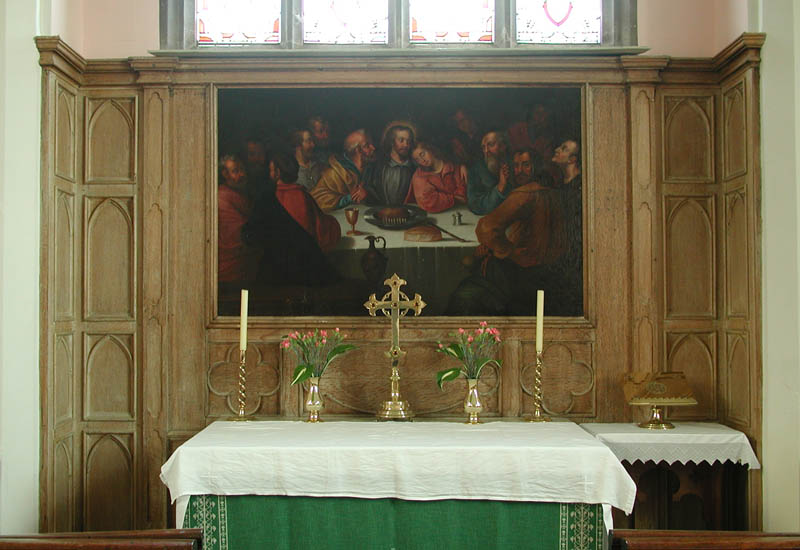
Flemish painting

Teigh claims to be a Thankful Village which lost no men in the First World War and a tablet near the altar commemorates this.

Anthony Jenkinson of the Muscovy Company was buried here in 1611. He had travelled as far as Bukhara when trying to reach Cathay overland from Moscow, and established overland trade routes through Russia to Persia.

== Notable clergy ==
Richard Folville, a member of the Folville gang of robbers led by his older brother Eustace, was rector here from 1321. In 1340–1 he was besieged in the church and then summarily beheaded in his churchyard.

John Torkington was rector of Teigh (and vicar of Stapleford), 1787 – 1815.

In 1940, the rector, Henry Stanley Tibbs, was briefly interned under Defence Regulation 18B for his pro-Nazi sympathies.

== See also ==
- St Mary Magdalene's Church, Stapleford
