= Cundall, North Yorkshire =

Hamlet and civil parish in North Yorkshire, England

Coordinates: 54°08′52″N 1°21′10″W

Cundall
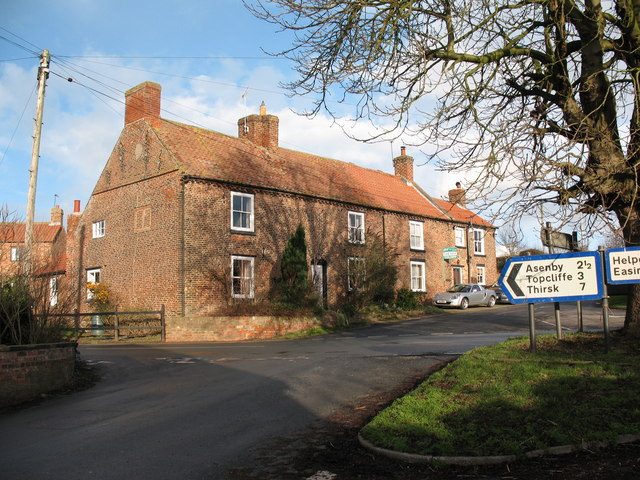
- Cundall village

- Location within North Yorkshire
- Population: 128 (2011)
- OS grid reference: SE 423 726
- Civil parish: Cundall with Leckby
- Unitary authority: North Yorkshire
- Ceremonial county: North Yorkshire
- Region: Yorkshire and the Humber
- Country: England
- Sovereign state: United Kingdom
- Post town: YORK
- Postcode district: YO61
- Police: North Yorkshire
- Fire: North Yorkshire
- Ambulance: Yorkshire
- UK Parliament: Skipton and Ripon (UK Parliament constituency)

Cundall is a village in the county of North Yorkshire, England. It is one of the Thankful Villages that suffered no fatalities during the First World War.

== Governance ==
The village lies within the Skipton & Ripon UK Parliamentary Constituency. From 1974 to 2023 it was part of the Borough of Harrogate, it is now administered by the unitary North Yorkshire Council. The village is part of the civil parish of Cundall with Leckby.

== Geography ==
The village is recorded in the UK Census of 1821 as having a population of 351. In the 1851 UK Census the population was 389 and in the 1881 UK Census was 301. In the 2001 UK Census the parish had a population of 102, of which 82 were aged over sixteen. Of these, 64 were in employment. There were 42 dwellings of which half were detached properties. The Census 2011 gave a population of 128.

== History ==
The village is mentioned in the Domesday Book of 1086 as Cundel in the Hallikeld hundred. The lord of the manor prior to the Norman invasion was Earl Waltheof and thereafter Alfred the butler under the rule of Robert, Count of Mortain.

The village is at an elevation of 98 feet (30 m) at its highest. The village is just 0.5 miles (0.8 km) west of the River Swale and 3.2 miles (5.1 km) east of the A1(M). The nearest settlements are Asenby 2.2 miles (3.5 km) to the north; Dishforth 2.3 miles (3.7 km) to the west and Helperby 2 miles (3.2 km) to the south. The village of Norton-le-Clay, which lies 1.7 miles (2.7 km) to the south-west, is another Thankful Village.

Cundall was featured on Darren Hayman's album, Thankful Villages Volume 2.

== Education ==
The village is home to Cundall Manor, an independent (fee-paying) co-educational school from ages 2.5 to 16 years.

State primary education for the village is provided by Dishforth CE School, Topcliffe CE school, or St Peter's Brafferton CE School. Secondary education is at Boroughbridge High School or Thirsk School and Sixth Form College.

== Religion ==
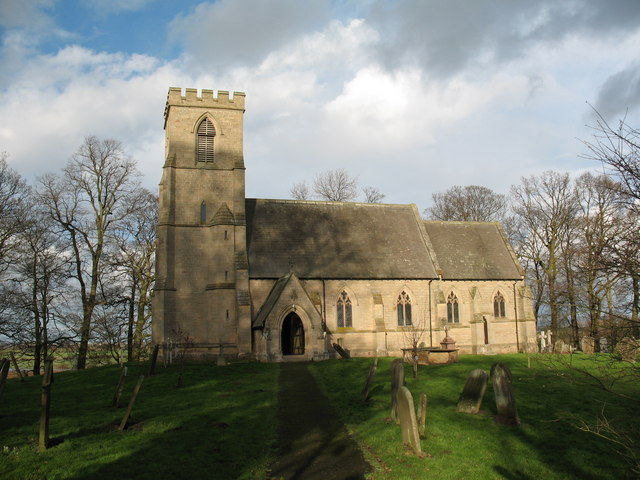
St Mary and All Saints' Church, Cundall

St Mary and All Saints' Church, Cundall is a Grade II listed building that was rebuilt in 1854.

== See also ==
- Listed buildings in Cundall with Leckby
