= Listed buildings in Cundall with Leckby =

Cundall with Leckby is a civil parish in the county of North Yorkshire, England. It contains eight listed buildings that are recorded in the National Heritage List for England. All the listed buildings are designated at Grade II, the lowest of the three grades, which is applied to "buildings of national importance and special interest". The parish contains the village of Cundall and the surrounding countryside. Apart from a church, the listed buildings consist of houses, farmhouses and farm buildings.

== Buildings ==
Name and location	Photograph	Date	Notes
Farm building southeast of Cundall Hall Farmhouse; 54.15177°N 1.34752°W	—	Late 16th or 17th century	The farm building is in red-brown brick with a hipped pantile roof. There are two storeys and six bays. It contains a sliding door, a stable door, three bottom-hinged windows, and a recessed chamfered mullioned window in the ground floor. There are similar mullioned windows in the upper floor, with a loading door, a blocked doorway, and horizontally-sliding sash windows.
Cundall Hall Farmhouse; 54.15193°N 1.34790°W		Early to mid 17th century	The farmhouse is in red-brown brick with a hipped purple slate roof. There are two storeys and a square plan, with fronts of three bays, and a rear service wing. In the centre is a porch with a segmental arch, pilasters with ball finials, and a moulded band. The windows on the front are sashes in architraves, and elsewhere there are chamfered mullioned and transomed windows. In the right return is a two-storey porch with a segmental arch.
Low House; 54.13975°N 1.35430°W	—	Early 18th century	The house is in red-brown brick, rendered on the left return, with a floor band, and a Welsh slate roof with tumbled-in brickwork on the right gable. There are two storeys and three bays. The doorway has a plain surround, and the windows are square three-light casements.
Eagle Farmhouse; 54.14791°N 1.35255°W		Early to mid 18th century	A house in red and brown brick, with a dentilled eaves cornice, and a pantile roof, coped on the right. There are two storeys and three bays. The windows are sashes in architraves, and at the rear is a dormer window.
Cundall Lodge Farmhouse; 54.15291°N 1.35715°W	—	Early to mid 19th century	The farmhouse is in red-brown brick with a grey slate roof. There are two storeys, three bays, and a rear service wing. Steps lead up to a central doorway with a fanlight and a wedge lintel. The windows are sashes in architraves.
Farm buildings northwest of Cundall Lodge Farmhouse; 54.15305°N 1.35744°W	—	Early to mid 19th century	The farm buildings are in red-brown brick with dentilled eaves cornices and pantile roofs, and are arranged round a courtyard. They consist of a northeast range including a three-storey dovecote flanked by a granary and possible stables, a northwest range containing a freestanding barn, a southwest range with single-storey cart sheds and cow houses, and a southeast range of single-storey buildings.
Home Farmhouse; 54.14784°N 1.35296°W	—	Mid 19th century	The house is in red-brown brick, and has a pantile roof with coped gables and shaped kneelers. There are two storeys and three bays. The doorway is in the centre, the windows are sashes in architraves, and all the openings have wedge lintels.
St Mary and All Saints' Church; 54.15200°N 1.35403°W		1854–55	The church is in limestone with a Westmorland slate roof, and in Decorated style. It consists of a three-bay nave with a south porch, a lower two-bay chancel with a north vestry, and a west tower. The tower has three stages, diagonal buttresses, a south stair tower, a west clock face, tall bell openings, and an embattled parapet. The porch is gabled and contains a pointed arch with a moulded surround.
