= Teigh =

Village in Rutland, England

Coordinates: 52.737°N 0.663°W

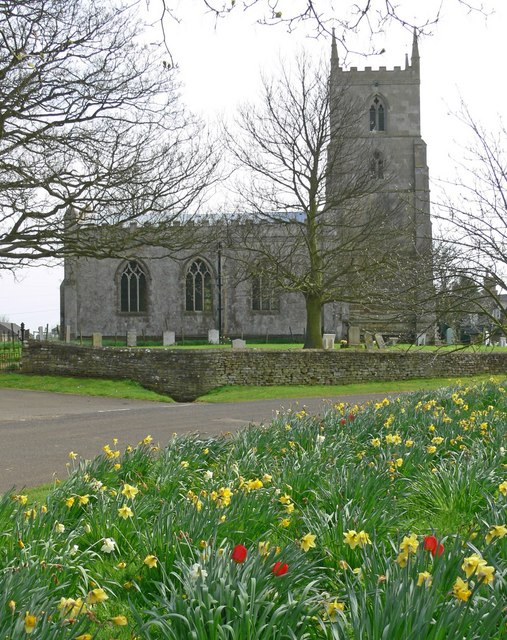
- Holy Trinity Church, Teigh

- Location within Rutland
- Area: 2.01 sq mi (5.2 km^{2})
- Population: 48 2001 Census
  - Density: 24/sq mi (9.3/km^{2})
- OS grid reference: SK903162
  - London: 89 miles (143 km) SSE
- Unitary authority: Rutland
- Shire county: Rutland
- Ceremonial county: Rutland
- Region: East Midlands
- Country: England
- Sovereign state: United Kingdom
- Post town: OAKHAM
- Postcode district: LE15
- Dialling code: 01572
- Police: Leicestershire
- Fire: Leicestershire
- Ambulance: East Midlands
- UK Parliament: Rutland and Stamford

Teigh is a village and civil parish in the county of Rutland in the East Midlands of England. The population of the village was 48 in the 2001 census. At the 2011 census the population remained less than 100 and was included with the civil parish of Market Overton. It is notable for its Holy Trinity Church, almost unaltered since a 1782 rebuild by Robert Sherard, 4th Earl of Harborough, that features pews that face one another rather than the altar. Both the parish church and the Old Rectory of 1740 are Grade II* listed buildings. The Old Rectory was used for the filming of the 1995 BBC series of Pride and Prejudice; it served as Hunsford parsonage, Mr Collins's modest home.

The village's name origin is unsure, the name probably means 'a small enclosure' or 'a meeting place'.

The writer Arthur Mee proposed Teigh as one of the few Thankful Villages which lost no men in the First World War. The village is featured on Darren Hayman's album, Thankful Villages Volume 3.

== Notable residents ==
- Richard Folville, a member of the Folville gang of robbers led by his older brother Eustace, was rector here from 1321. In 1340–1 he was besieged in the church and then summarily beheaded in his churchyard.
- Anthony Jenkinson, main trader of the Muscovy Company was buried here in 1611. He had travelled as far as Bukhara when trying to reach Cathay overland from Moscow, and established overland trade routes through Russia to Persia.
- Monica Redlich, a writer, lived in Teigh as a child.
- In 1940, the vicar of Teigh, Henry Stanley Tibbs, was interned under Defence Regulation 18B for his pro-Nazi sympathies, but soon released after it was determined he was harmless.
