= HM Prison Liverpool =

Men's prison in Liverpool, England

Coordinates: 53.4579°N 2.9698°W

HMP Liverpool
- Postcard image of Walton Gaol in 1910
- Interactive map of HMP Liverpool
- Location: Walton, Liverpool
- Security class: Category B Local
- Capacity: 1,370
- Population: 810 (August 2021)
- Opened: 1855; 171 years ago
- Governor: Rob Luxford
- Website: Liverpool at justice.gov.uk

HM Prison Liverpool (formerly Walton Gaol) is a category B local men's prison in Walton, Liverpool, England. It is operated by His Majesty's Prison Service.

== History ==
Liverpool Prison (originally known as Walton Gaol) was constructed between 1848 and 1855 to the designs of John Weightman borough surveyor (not to be confused with his near contemporary John Grey Weightman ) to replace an 18th-century establishment in the centre of Liverpool, which had become too small for current needs. It originally housed male and female inmates.

On 4 February 1939 the IRA attempted, but failed, to break a wall of the prison during the S-Plan bombing campaign in Britain that year.

During the Liverpool Blitz of World War II, on 18 September 1940, German high explosive bombs falling on a wing of the prison partially demolished it, killing 22 inmates. The body of one was not found until 11 years later when rubble was finally cleared.

The prison was the site of 62 judicial executions, from 1887 to 1964. The last execution at the prison was that of Peter Anthony Allen. He and his accomplice Gwynne Owen Evans were convicted for the murder of John Alan West in April 1964. They were simultaneously hanged on 13 August 1964; Allen was hanged at Walton Gaol, and Evans at Strangeways in Manchester. Capital punishment for murder was abolished fifteen months later.

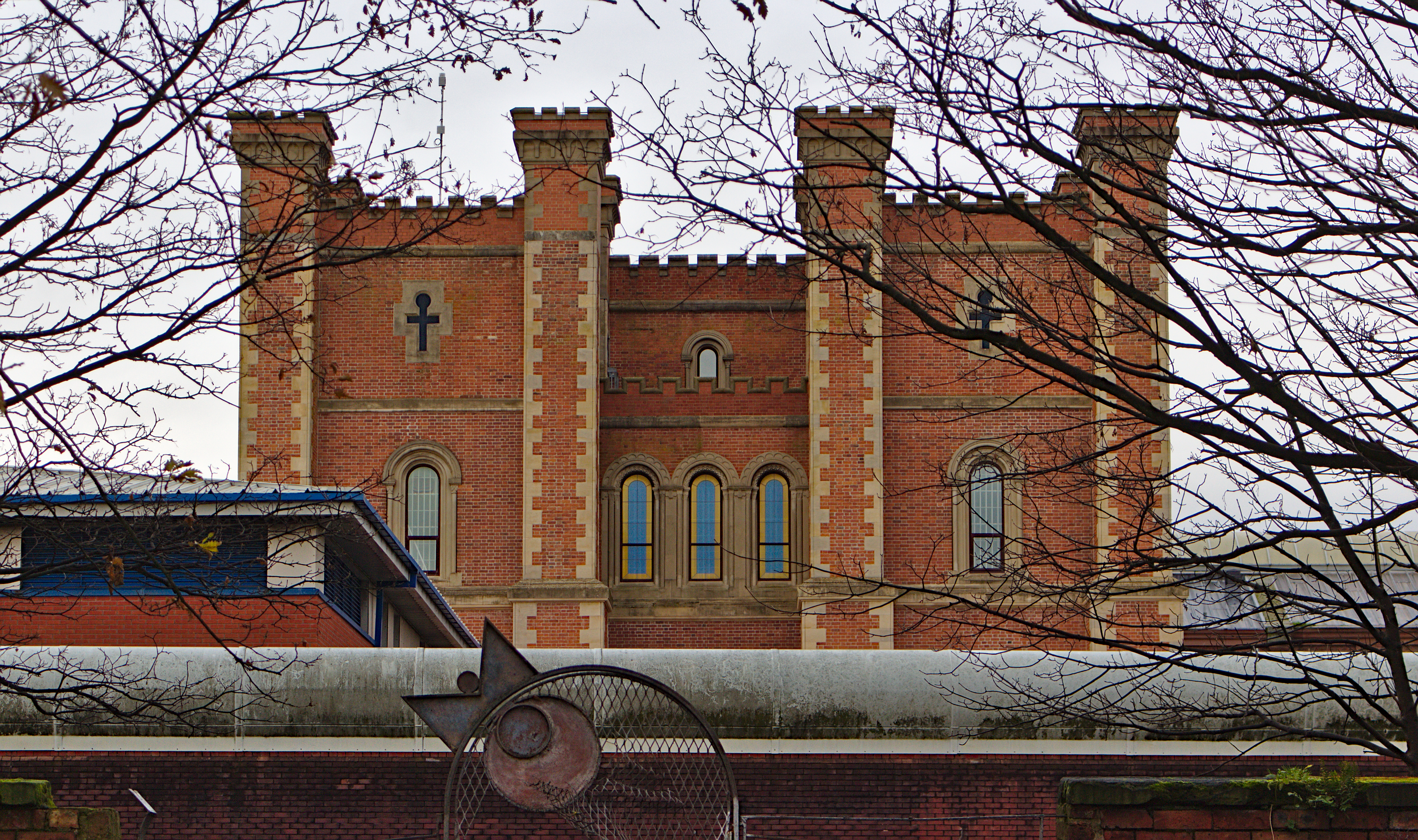
View of the prison gatehouse in 2020

In May 2003 an inspection report from His Majesty's Chief Inspector of Prisons severely criticised Liverpool Prison for its overcrowding and poor industrial relations which had led to an unacceptable regime. The inspection found that parts of the jail were generally unclean, had cockroach infestations and broken windows. Inmates were able to shower and change their clothes just once a week at the prison.

A further inspection report in February 2010, stated that drugs, bullying and violence were still prevalent at Liverpool Prison, despite the prison improving in other areas. Days later, it emerged that the Prison Service had refunded nearly £10,000 to inmates at HMP Liverpool, who were being overcharged for watching television in their cells. The prison was charging £1 per prisoner per week instead of per cell, meaning that inmates who were sharing a cell were paying more than they needed to.

In January 2015, three prison officers were hospitalised after being attacked by prisoners.

== The prison today ==
HM Prison Liverpool is a local prison for remand and sentenced adult males in the Merseyside area. The prison has eight wings, all of which have been refurbished to include integral sanitation. As of May 2009, its population was 1,184, one of the largest in the UK, but smaller than a peak population of 1,443 in 2008.

Liverpool Prison offers education and training courses, provided by Novus as well as workshops and programmes organised by the prison's Psychology Department. There is also a programme run by the charity Shannon Trust, which sees prisoner mentors helping other prisoners who have low-level literacy and numeracy skills. The establishment previously housed a hugely successful in cell radio programme 'Walton Radio', which offered prisoners radio production qualifications, music technology qualifications, along with emphases on rehabilitation through employability upskilling. A Listener Scheme, supported by the Samaritans, operates for prisoners who are at risk from suicide or self-harm. There is a resettlement unit at HMP Liverpool which comprises a Citizens' Advice Unit, Connexions, Shelter and Job Centre Plus. All healthcare services at Liverpool Prison are commissioned through Liverpool Primary Care Trust. A new all-purpose 28-bed inpatient and primary care service was opened in summer 2007. In October 2017 Lancashire Care NHS Foundation Trust announced that they were to end their contract to provide healthcare services by April 2018, with a new provider to be arranged in the near future.

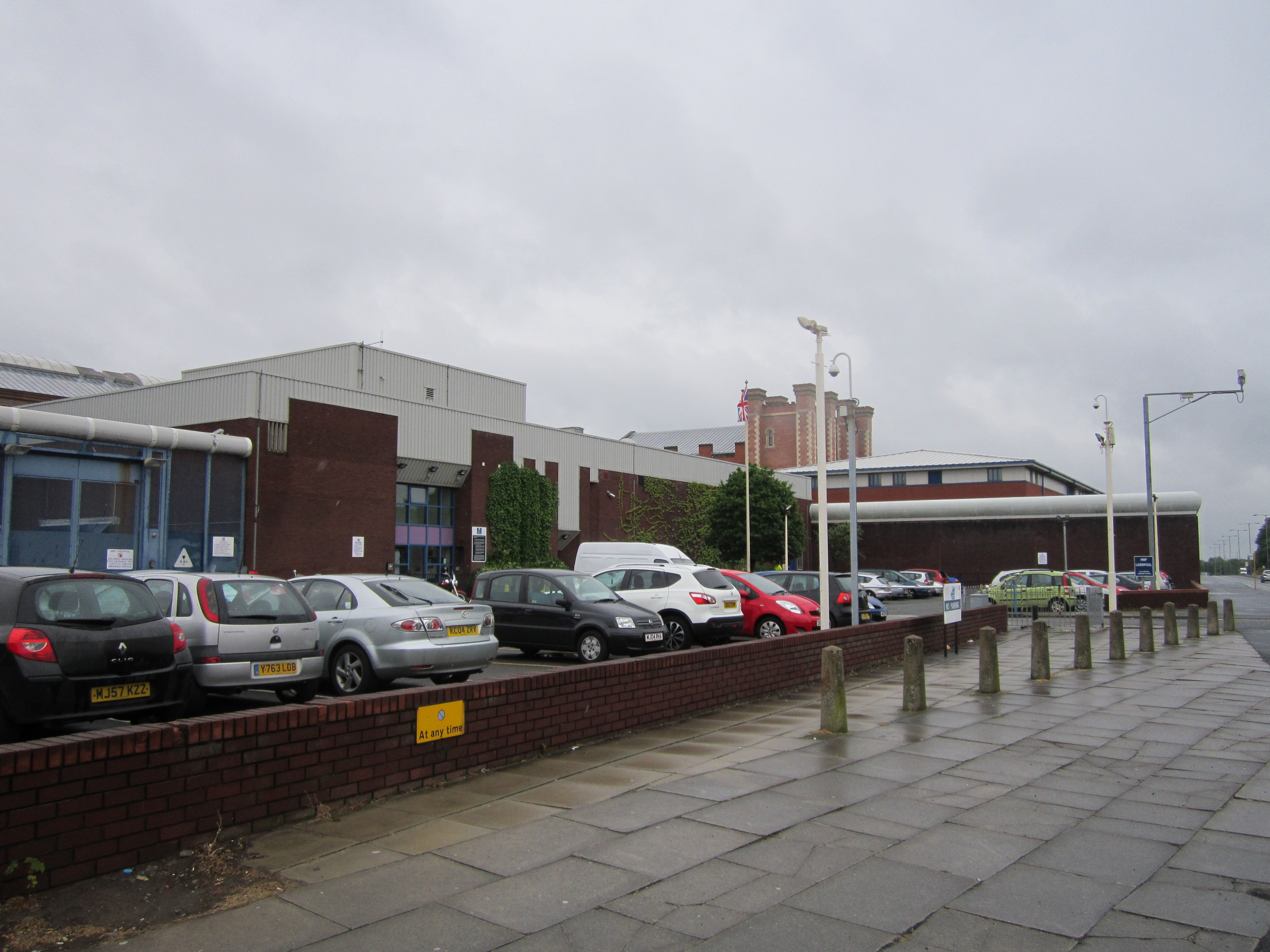
Entrance of HMP Liverpool in 2012

In October 2017, the prison's governor, Peter Francis, was dismissed from his role for 'operational reasons' after a snap inspection by His Majesty's Inspectorate of Prisons. He had previously been labelled a 'questionable leader' and 'lacking in credibility' in reports by HMI Prisons. The prison was reported in 2017 to be rat and cockroach infested and basic maintenance such as repairing toilets and leaking sinks had in too many cases not been carried out. There are claims that prisoners have died or been seriously injured through poor care. Peter Clarke wrote in a report, "I found a prisoner who had complex mental health needs being held in a cell that had no furniture other than a bed. The windows of both the cell and the toilet recess were broken, the light fitting in his toilet was broken with wires exposed, the lavatory was filthy and appeared to be blocked, his sink was leaking and the cell was dark and damp. Extraordinarily, this man had apparently been held in this condition for some weeks." Clarke also wrote, "We saw clear evidence that local prison managers had sought help from regional and national management to improve conditions they knew to be unacceptable long before our arrival, but had met with little response." Local MP Dan Carden called the situation in the prison a "state failure of the highest magnitude".

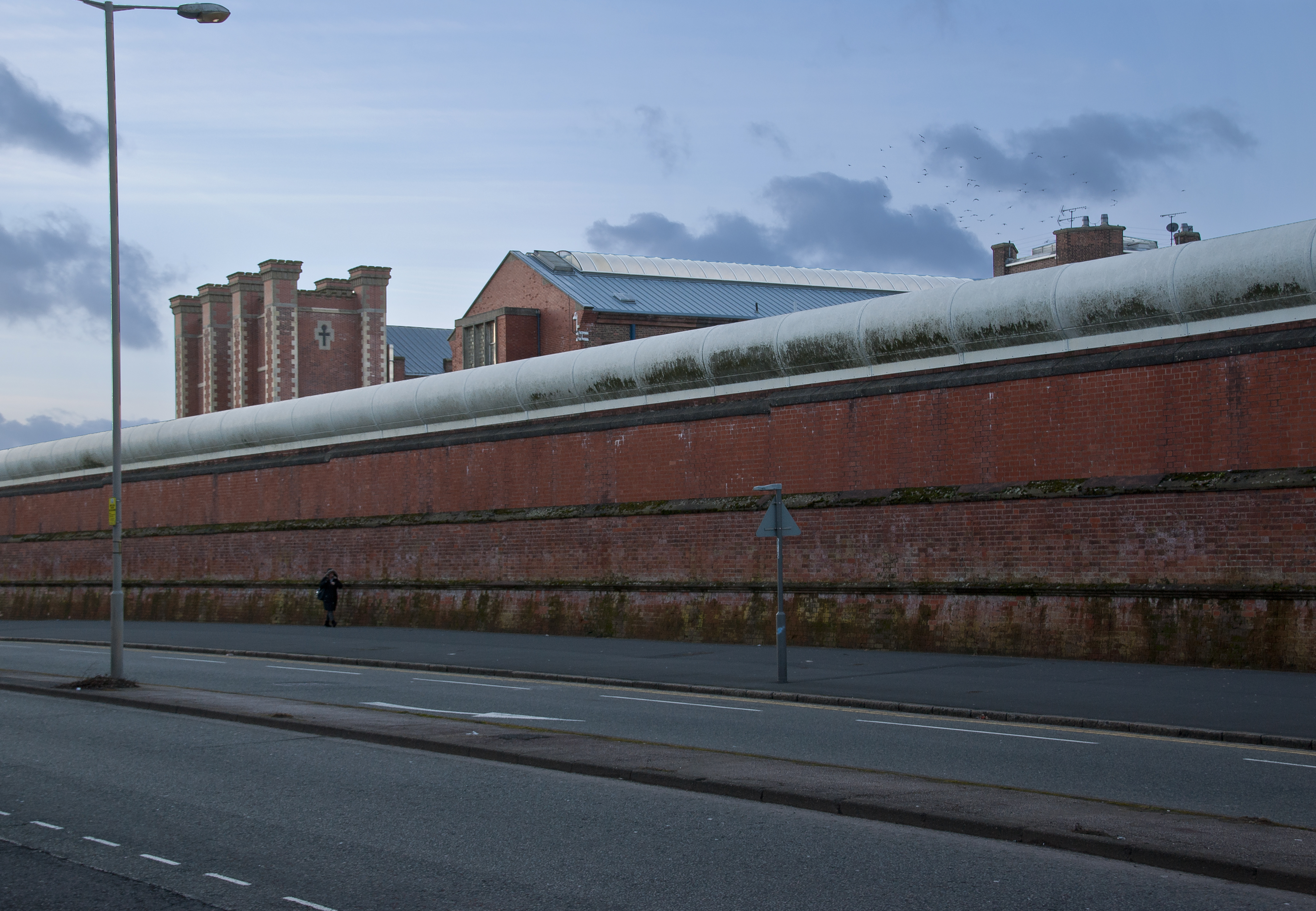
Exterior wall of HMP Liverpool in 2015

On 24 January 2018, the Justice Select Committee of the House of Commons held a one off hearing on the conditions in Liverpool Prison with the Governor and senior representatives from HM Prison and Probation Service and NHS England. Following the hearing the Committee produced a report which cited concerns about the lack of follow-up after previous poor inspections. That report was followed by a debate in the House of Commons Chamber led by the Chair of the Committee Sir Robert Neil and the Justice Minister, Rory Stewart. The committee's work resulted in HM Inspectorate of Prisons being given additional funding to follow up on its own inspections.

In 2018, it was reported that prisoners with psychiatric needs are at risk according to a psychiatrist, they have to wait too long to be seen and do not get proper care due to lack of staff. Two workers at the prison expressed concerns when a new policy required them to work alone. They feared prisoners could steal their tool box and use the tools as weapons. They were dismissed for raising this concern. An employment tribunal ruled this dismissal was unfair.

In January 2020, a report following an inspection concluded that conditions at the prison had "improved dramatically" since 2017.

== Notable inmates ==
- Akinwale Arobieke
- Joey Barton
- Brendan Behan
- Fenner Brockway, Baron Brockway
- Charles Bronson
- Lady Constance Bulwer-Lytton
- Selina Martin
- Martin Murray
- Henry Tibbs
- Robert Tressell
- Mark Ward
- Laetitia Withall
