= George Richardson (architect) =

Scottish architect

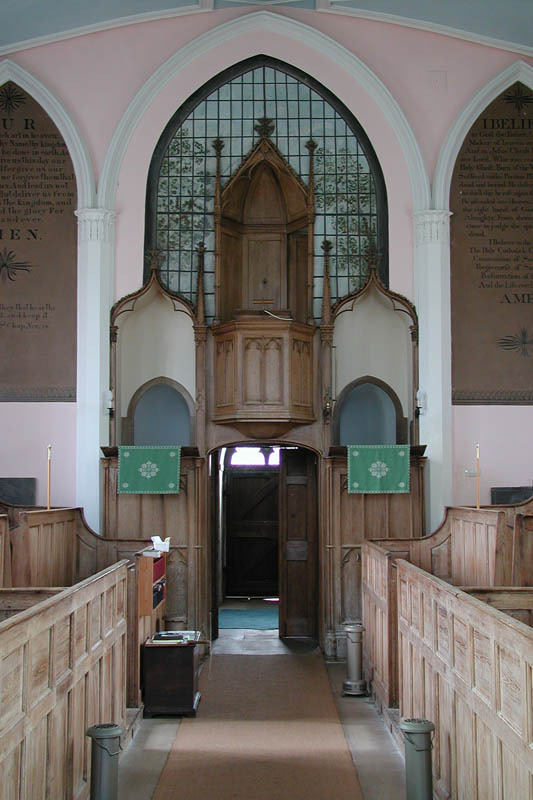
West end of Holy Trinity Church, Teigh

George Richardson (1737 or 1738 – c.1813) was a Scottish architectural and decorative draftsman and writer on architecture. Although the dates of his birth and death are not known for certain, he was a contemporary and rival of the Adam brothers.

Among his few remaining architectural works are two churches built for the Earl of Harborough: Holy Trinity Church, Teigh in Rutland and St Mary Magdalene's Church, Stapleford in Leicestershire.

His main output, however, was in the form of books. His publications were subscribed to not only by many leading architects of the day, but also by painters, sculptors and other craftsmen.

== Life ==
Richardson spent three years, from 1760 to 1763, travelling in Dalmatia and Istria, in the south of France and in Italy. During that period he imbibed the inspiration of a lifetime, and acquired the material for its practical application. He soon began to show skill in adapting classical ideals to the uses of his time, and in 1765 he won a premium offered by the Society of Arts for a design of a street in the classical manner.

Richardson's work was so closely allied to that of the brothers Adam that it is often difficult to distinguish between them. Richardson was an especially successful designer of ceilings and chimney pieces. He published in 1776 a Book of Ceilings in the Style of the Antique Grotesque. Many of its drawings are tasteful, and his fireplace work, as represented by his Collection of Chimneypieces Ornamented in the Style of the Etruscan, Greek and Roman Architecture (1781), is equally attractive. His chimney pieces are mostly of marble, but examples in wood are not uncommon. He made extensive use of coloured marbles. Like the Adams, Richardson often worked with composition enrichments, and his New Designs in Architecture (1792) contains many drawings of interior friezes and columns to be executed either in this medium or painted to suit the wall hangings. His versatility was considerable, as the titles of his works, a dozen in number, suggest.

For many years he exhibited at the Royal Academy as well as in the galleries of the Society of Arts. Why such a man should have fallen into penury in his old age is uncertain, but we know that he was assisted by Joseph Nollekens.

== Works ==
- A Book of Ceilings Composed in the Style of the Antique Grotesque (1776)
- A New Collection of Chimneypieces Ornamented in the Style of the Etruscan, Greek, and Roman Architecture (1781)
- Ædes Pembrochianae (1774)
- Iconology (2 volumes), with plates by Francesco Bartolozzi and other engravers (1778–1779)
- Iconology, or, A Collection of Emblematical Figures (2 volumes, 1779), drawing largely from Cesare Ripa
- A Treatise on the Five Orders of Architecture (1787)
- New Designs in Architecture (1792)
- Original Designs for Country Seats or Villas (1795)
- The New Vitruvius Britannicus (1802) and The New Vitruvius Britannica Volume II (1803) [sequels to Colen Campbell's Vitrivius Britannicus]
- A Collection of Ornaments in the Antique Style (1816)

He also published volumes dealing with vases and tripods, antique friezes and other architectural and decorative details.

== See also ==
- Architecture of Scotland
- Category:Architecture in Scotland
- Category:Scottish architects
