= St Mary and All Saints' Church, Cundall =

Church in Cundall, North Yorkshire, England

Coordinates: 54°09′07″N 1°21′14″W

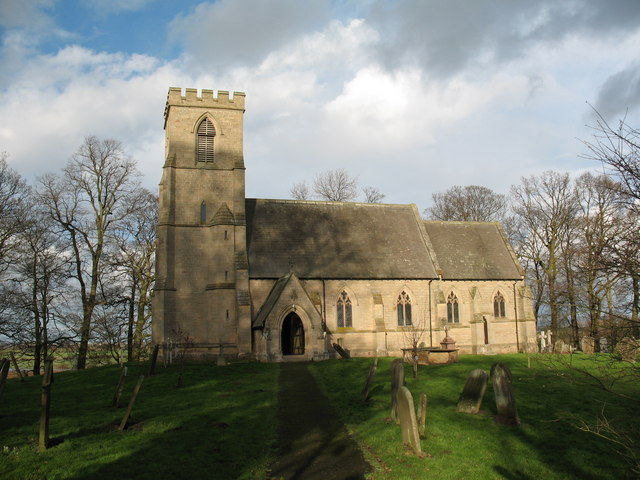
The church, in 2007

St Mary and All Saints' Church is the parish church of Cundall, North Yorkshire, a village in England.

There was a mediaeval church in Cundall, which was described in 1823 as "mean and diminuitive", with a recently built brick tower. The building was demolished, and a replacement was designed by Mallinson and Healey, and completed in 1852. The church was grade II listed in 1987.

The church is built of limestone with a Westmorland slate roof, in the Decorated style. It consists of a three-bay nave with a south porch, a lower two-bay chancel with a north vestry, and a west tower. The tower has three stages, diagonal buttresses, a south stair tower, a west clock face, tall bell openings, and an embattled parapet. The porch is gabled and contains a pointed arch with a moulded surround. Inside the tower is an Anglo-Saxon cross shaft decorated with animals, dating from around 800. The wooden altar rail dates from 1852, while most other fixtures are early 20th century. The clock mechanism dates from 1875.

== See also ==
- Listed buildings in Cundall with Leckby
