= High Toynton =

Village and civil parish in Lincolnshire, England

Coordinates: 53.210760°N 0.07873°W

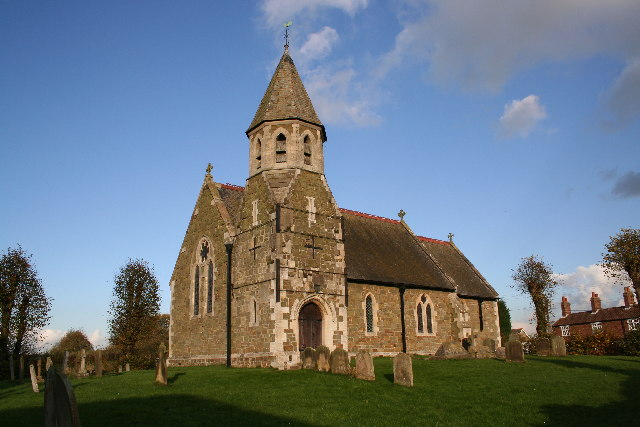
- Church of St John the Baptist, High Toynton, showing the bell tower which collapsed in January 2020

- Location within Lincolnshire
- OS grid reference: TF284699
  - London: 115 mi (185 km) S
- District: East Lindsey
- Shire county: Lincolnshire
- Region: East Midlands
- Country: England
- Sovereign state: United Kingdom
- Post town: HORNCASTLE
- Postcode district: LN9
- Dialling code: 01507
- Police: Lincolnshire
- Fire: Lincolnshire
- Ambulance: East Midlands
- UK Parliament: Louth and Horncastle

High Toynton is a village and civil parish in the East Lindsey district of Lincolnshire, England. It is situated approximately 1.5 miles (2.4 km) east from the town of Horncastle, and in the Lincolnshire Wolds, a designated Area of Outstanding Natural Beauty.

High Toynton is one of the Thankful Villages that did not suffer fatalities during the First World War. The village is featured on Darren Hayman's album, Thankful Villages Volume 3.

Around the village has been found evidence of Medieval, Roman or earlier Neolithic and Bronze Age occupation.

In 1885 Kelly's noted the existence of a Wesleyan chapel, built in 1840. The Lord of the manor was James Banks Stanhope DL JP of Revesby Abbey. High Toynton covered an area of 1,054 acres (4.27 km^{2}) with chief agricultural production of wheat, barley, oats, seeds and turnips, and an 1881 population of 133.

The parish church, dedicated to St John the Baptist, was rebuilt in 1872 of greenstone by Ewan Christian, who reused 12th-century fragments from the previous church erected in 1779. It is a Grade II listed building. The church tower collapsed in January 2020, and £200,000 National Lottery Heritage Funding towards rebuilding was allocated in July 2022.

There are two Grade II listed thatched dwellings in High Toynton: an 18th-century mud and stud cottage, and a similar red-brick-encased house.
