= Thorne St Margaret =

Village in Somerset, England

Coordinates: 50.9818°N 3.2861°W

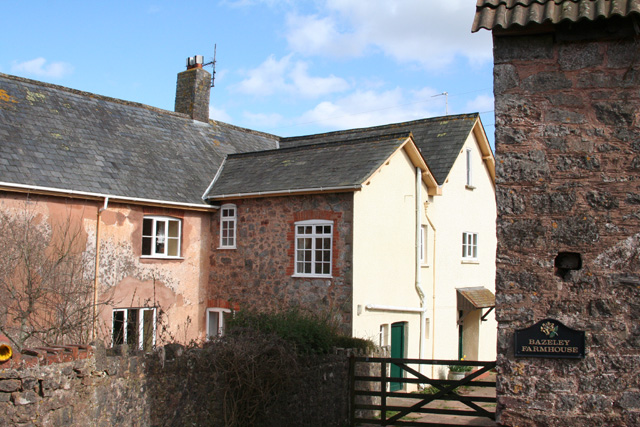
- Bazeley Farmhouse

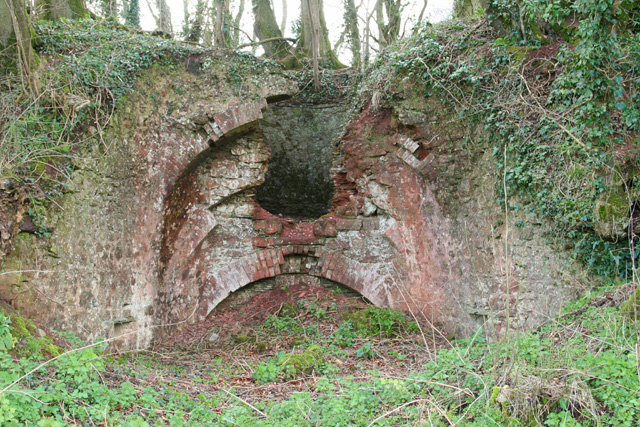
- Limekiln near Piley Copse

- Location within Somerset
- OS grid reference: ST098210
- Civil parish: Wellington Without
- Unitary authority: Somerset Council
- Ceremonial county: Somerset
- Region: South West
- Country: England
- Sovereign state: United Kingdom
- Post town: WELLINGTON
- Postcode district: TA21
- Dialling code: 01823
- Police: Avon and Somerset
- Fire: Devon and Somerset
- Ambulance: South Western
- UK Parliament: Taunton and Wellington

Thorne St Margaret is a village in the civil parish of Wellington Without in the county of Somerset, England. It is situated 3 miles west of Wellington, between the river Tone and the Bristol and Exeter railway. The village of Holywell Lake is nearby, which is one of the Thankful Villages which lost no men in World War I. Holywell Lake is featured on Darren Hayman's album, Thankful Villages Volume 1.

The parish of Thorne St Margaret was part of the Milverton Hundred.

The Church of St Margaret serves a parish population of about 50. The church has a 15th-century tower with three bells. The rest of the church was rebuilt in 1865, with a west window, with stained glass, added in 1907. The church is built of hard red sandstone and has a baptismal font dating to Saxon times. It has been designated by English Heritage as a Grade II* listed building.

== Civil parish ==
In 1961 the parish had a population of 82. On 1 April 1986 the parish was abolished.

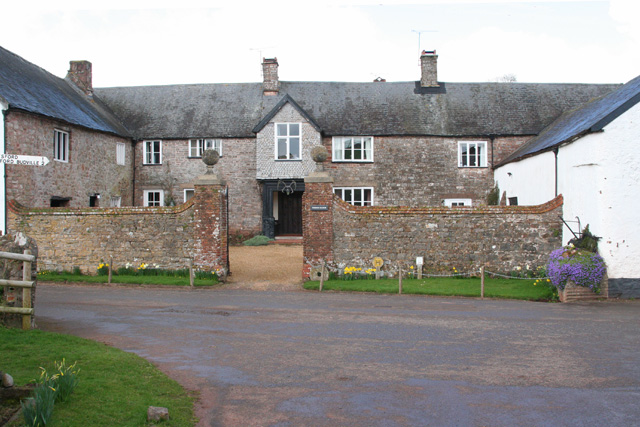
Thorne Manor
