= Anne Whateley =

Woman alleged to have been the intended wife of Shakespeare

Anne (or Anna) Whateley is the name given to a woman who is sometimes supposed to have been the intended wife of William Shakespeare before he married Anne Hathaway. Most scholars believe that Whateley never existed, and that her name in a document concerning Shakespeare's marriage is merely a clerical error. However, several writers on Shakespeare have taken the view that she was a real person, and a rival to Hathaway for Shakespeare's hand. She has also appeared in imaginative literature on Shakespeare and in Shakespeare authorship speculations. Shakespeare's biographer Russell A. Fraser describes her as "a ghost", "haunting the edges of Shakespeare's story". She has also been called "the first of the Shakespearean Dark Ladies".

== Evidence ==
Whateley's existence has been deduced from an entry in the Episcopal register at Worcester which states in Latin Anno Domini 1582...Novembris...27 die eiusdem mensis. Item eodem die supradicto emanavit Licentia inter Wm Shaxpere et Annam Whateley de Temple Grafton." ('In the year of our Lord 1582 — November — the 27th day of that month. Also on the same day aforesaid a License was issued between Wm Shaxpere and Anne Whateley of Temple Grafton'.) The following day, Fulk Sandells and John Richardson, friends of the Hathaway family from Stratford-upon-Avon, signed a surety of £40 as a financial guarantee for the wedding of "William Shagspere and Anne Hathwey".

The entry in the register was discovered in the late nineteenth century by Reverend T. P. Wadley. Various explanations were offered. Initially it was assumed that Whateley was an alternative surname for Anne Hathaway herself. Wadley believed that it was probably an alias, used by Hathaway in order to keep the date of the marriage secret to obscure the fact that she was already pregnant. Another suggestion was that Anne Hathaway might legitimately have used the name, either because her father Richard Hathaway was in fact her step-father, her mother having previously been married to a man called Whateley, or because Anne herself may have previously been married to a man named Whateley. None of these suggestions gained support, since they contradicted other existing evidence.

The names of Shakespeare and Whateley in the note in the Episcopal register at Worcester

The Whateley note is discussed in Sidney Lee's 1898 book A Life of William Shakespeare. Lee argues that the "William Shakespeare" who is engaged to Whateley is probably a different person from the playwright, as there were "numerous William Shakespeares, who abounded in the diocese of Worcester". In 1905 Joseph William Gray in Shakespeare's Marriage gave a detailed argument for clerical error due to the existence of lawsuits involving Whateleys that were being written up by the same scribe. However, Frank Harris's 1909 book, The Man Shakespeare, ignored Gray's argument and dismissed Lee's suggestion that there were two William Shakespeares as wildly implausible. He insisted that these documents are evidence that Shakespeare was involved with two separate women. He intended to marry Anne Whateley, but, when this became known, he was immediately forced by Anne Hathaway's family to marry their relative, since he had already made her pregnant. Harris believed that Shakespeare despised his wife, and that his forced marriage was the spur to his creative work:

If Shakespeare had married Anne Whately he might never have gone to London or written a play. Shakespeare's hatred of his wife and his regret for having married her were alike foolish. Our brains are seldom the wisest part of us. It was well that he made love to Anne Hathaway; well, too, that he was forced to marry her; well, finally, that he should desert her. I am sorry he treated her badly and left her unsupplied with money; that was needlessly cruel; but it is just the kindliest men who have these extraordinary lapses; Shakespeare's loathing for his wife was measureless.

Some biographers, notably Ivor Brown and Anthony Burgess, followed Harris' lead, portraying Whateley as Shakespeare's true love. Brown argued that she was the Dark Lady of the sonnets. In 1970 Burgess wrote,

It is reasonable to believe that Will wished to marry a girl named Anne Whateley. The name is common enough in the Midlands and is even attached to a four-star hotel in Horse Fair, Banbury. Her father may have been a friend of John Shakespeare's, he may have sold kidskin cheap, there are various reasons why the Shakespeares and the Whateleys, or their nubile children, might become friendly. Sent on skin-buying errands to Temple Grafton, Will could have fallen for a comely daughter, sweet as May and shy as a fawn. He was eighteen and highly susceptible. Knowing something about girls, he would know that this was the real thing. Something, perhaps, quite different from what he felt about Mistress Hathaway of Shottery. But why, attempting to marry Anne Whateley, had he put himself in the position of having to marry the other Anne? I suggest that, to use the crude but convenient properties of the old women's-magazine morality-stories, he was exercised by love for the one and lust for the other.

According to Stanley Wells in the Oxford Companion to Shakespeare, most modern scholars take the same view as Gray, that the name Whateley was "almost certainly the result of clerical error". It may have arisen because the clerk was also recording information about a tithe appeal by a vicar, which included a reference to a person named Whateley. Though there was a Whateley family in the area, no independent evidence has ever been found of the existence of an Anne Whateley in Temple Grafton or anywhere else nearby. As for Lee's claim that there were "numerous" other William Shakespeares in the diocese, later researchers have found no surviving records of any other William Shakespeares of marriageable age in the diocese of Worcester.

== Authorship speculations ==
After Harris's initial argument a number of imaginative claims were made about Anne Whateley, most dramatically that she was the true author of Shakespeare's works. This argument- which has been concluded to be entirely without satisfactory evidence- was made by William Ross in his book The Story of Anne Whateley and William Shaxpere (1939), in which he asserted that Whateley was a nun who was Shakespeare's "lover and consort in their spiritual union". Ross claims she was born in 1561, the daughter of the well-known seafarer Anthony Jenkinson, and that she was living a secluded life among the nuns of the Order of St. Clare when she met Shakespeare. According to Ross's story, they fell in love, and Anne was about to leave the order to marry him when Hathaway revealed her pregnancy. In Ross's view, Whateley wrote the sonnets as gifts to Shakespeare, and he states that her authorship can be deduced from them, in that they describe the history of her spiritual relationship with him. Ross considers that Hathaway is the Dark Lady of the sonnets, while Shakespeare himself is the Fair Youth, and that their intimate friendship continued after his marriage to Hathaway; its deepening spirituality is explored in the later sonnets. Eventually the friendship was broken up by Hathaway's jealousy, and Shakespeare left for London. She wrote A Lover's Complaint, which was appended to the sonnets, to express Anne Hathaway's point of view. No evidence was provided by Ross for these conclusions save that they resulted from his own interpretation of the texts.

Ross claimed that Whateley wished to dedicate the sonnets to Shakespeare, but wrote the dedication to Mr W.H. instead of "W.S", so that the identity of her lost love should remain mysterious; "W.H" was preferred because it was the initials of both her own surname and Hathaway's, implying that Shakespeare was, in a sense, both their husbands: Mr W and Mr H. According to Ross, "the initials therefore represent all three, and no better selection was possible". Ross alleged that she gave him the full collection when he left for London- which explains the dedication to the "well-wishing adventurer in setting forth"- and that she later wrote The Phoenix and the Turtle to commemorate their spiritual union.

Ross emphasises that his discovery removes all suggestion of homoeroticism from the sonnets, and thus "the taint of perversion, so odious to all lovers of Shakespeare, has been dissipated". He has very little to say about the plays, but states that Whateley probably wrote Shakespeare's plays to help him make a living. Nevertheless, he describes the playwriting as a "collaboration", though Shakespeare's role was probably "passive". Ross portrays Shakespeare himself as a talented writer, a worthy assistant to Whateley's "genius". After Anne's death he wrote "The Twenty-First and Last Book of the Ocean, to Cynthia", hitherto attributed to Walter Raleigh.

Ross argues that the sonnets reveal that Whateley also knew Edmund Spenser and helped him to write The Shepherd's Calendar. She was also the sole author of The Faerie Queene and Amoretti. In the 1580s she met and helped Michael Drayton and Philip Sidney, probably inspiring the sonnet revival of the period. The poem Hero and Leander, usually attributed to Christopher Marlowe, describes her relationship with Shakespeare. She also wrote Marlowe's plays. After her death in 1600 her unpublished works were published in the book Poetical Rhapsody, attributed to "A.W."

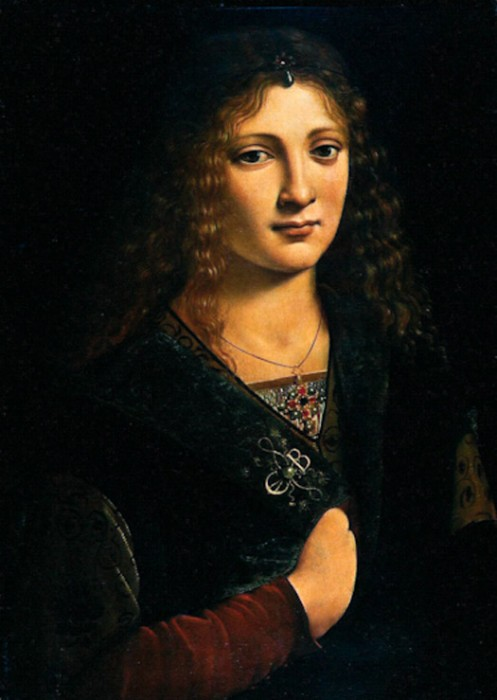
Portrait was claimed by W.J. Fraser Hutcheson to depict Anne Whateley, and to have been painted by Sofonisba Anguissola. It is usually identified as a probable image of the poet Girolamo Casio, painted by Giovanni Boltraffio.

Ross's speculations were developed by his friend W.J. Fraser Hutcheson in his book Shakespeare's Other Anne (1950). He follows Ross's claim that Whateley's father was Jenkinson, adding that Whateley's real name was Elizabeth Anne Beck and that her mother was an Anne Beck who died in childbirth. She used the name Whateley because of the household in which she grew up. Falling in love with Shakespeare, she was broken-hearted when he married Hathaway. She fled to Italy, where she acquired the knowledge that would later be used in Shakespeare's Italian plays. Many of her works were published under the name "Ignotus". Hutcheson also claims to have identified a portrait of Whateley, the work of Sofonisba Anguissola, the several copies of which attest to the esteem in which she was held. Hutcheson suggests that Whateley is portrayed as Rosalind and other female characters in Shakespeare's plays. While insisting that she inspired the plays, he does not explicitly assert that she wrote them.

Neither Ross nor Hutcheson provide documentary evidence to support their theories. Ross relies on his readings of the poems while Hutcheson finds coded messages in texts and images. The portrait he identifies as Whateley is generally believed to depict the courtier and poet Girolamo Casio. It is attributed to Giovanni Antonio Boltraffio, rather than Anguissola, and its likely depiction of Casio was accepted long before he wrote the book. Kit Mayers, in his biography of Jenkinson, analysed all the available information and claims from Harris onward and concluded "the fascinating and elaborate story of Jenkinson and his supposed illegitimate daughter does not stand up. The whole concoction is a fiction; there is absolutely no convincing evidence that Jenkinson had any secret romance."

Proponents of other alternative authorship theories have also used Frank Harris' version of the Anne Whateley story, typically to portray Shakespeare as a duplicitous scapegrace, traits which are supposed to disqualify him as an author of great poetry. Robert Frazer, who believed that The Earl of Derby wrote the canon, argued that Shakespeare actually married Whateley, not Hathaway.

== In fiction ==
Whateley has also appeared in imaginative literature about Shakespeare, typically portrayed as Shakespeare's true love, in contrast to a less appealing Anne Hathaway. Anne appears in Hubert Osborne's play The Good Men Do (1917), which dramatises a meeting between the newly widowed Anne Hathaway and Anne Whateley. Hathaway is depicted as viciously shrewish and spiteful, in contrast to her noble-minded former rival. Both women portray Shakespeare's life as an actor and playwright as morally degrading, Whateley insisting that he would have been saved from this shameful profession had he married her. Ivor Brown also published a play, William's Other Anne (1947) in which Shakespeare returns from London to meet Anne Whateley eight years after their broken engagement, just as Anne is about to marry a priggish schoolmaster. Shakespeare and Anne are reconciled, and Shakespeare saves his father from bankruptcy at the hands of Anne's vengeful mother. The play was broadcast on BBC television in 1953 starring Irene Worth as Anne and John Gregson as Shakespeare.

Whateley is mentioned in Late Mister Shakespeare (1998) by Robert Nye, a novel in which an elderly actor who knew Shakespeare in his youth reconstructs the poet's life. He speculates about whether or not she actually existed. She also appears in Graeme Johnstone's novel The Playmakers (2005), in which she is portrayed as an innocent girl with a "sweet nature", "perfect figure, perfect teeth...perfectly shaped nose, clear blue eyes and creamy skin". She is devastated by the discovery that her beloved William has made Hathaway pregnant. She and William are soulmates who plan to work together to improve William's father's leather-making business. Anne hangs herself with a leather rope after the manipulative Hathaway forces Shakespeare to abandon her. The image of his lost love haunts Shakespeare throughout his life. He leaves for London to become a front man for Christopher Marlowe's playwriting. He eventually finds a new love who is the mirror image of Whateley.

Laurie Lawlor's novel The Two Loves of Will Shakespeare (2006) depicts a teenage Shakespeare who seduces willing girls with his wit and charm. He is asked by his friend Richard Field to help him woo the beautiful and devout Anne Whateley, but falls in love with her himself. He tries to reform his ways to become worthy of her, but cannot resist his sexual urges, getting Hathaway pregnant.

In Karen Harper's novel Mistress Shakespeare (2008) Anne Whateley is the central character. She is once more portrayed as Shakespeare's true love. She narrates the story of her life as the dusky-skinned daughter of a Stratford businessman and an Italian acrobat. She and Shakespeare are married in a "handfast" ceremony which is known only to them. In London she carries on a secret parallel marriage with him while Hathaway and her children stay in Stratford. She inspires many of his works and shares his feelings, triumphs and fears.
