= Anthony Jenkinson =

English diplomat and traveller (1529 – c.1611)

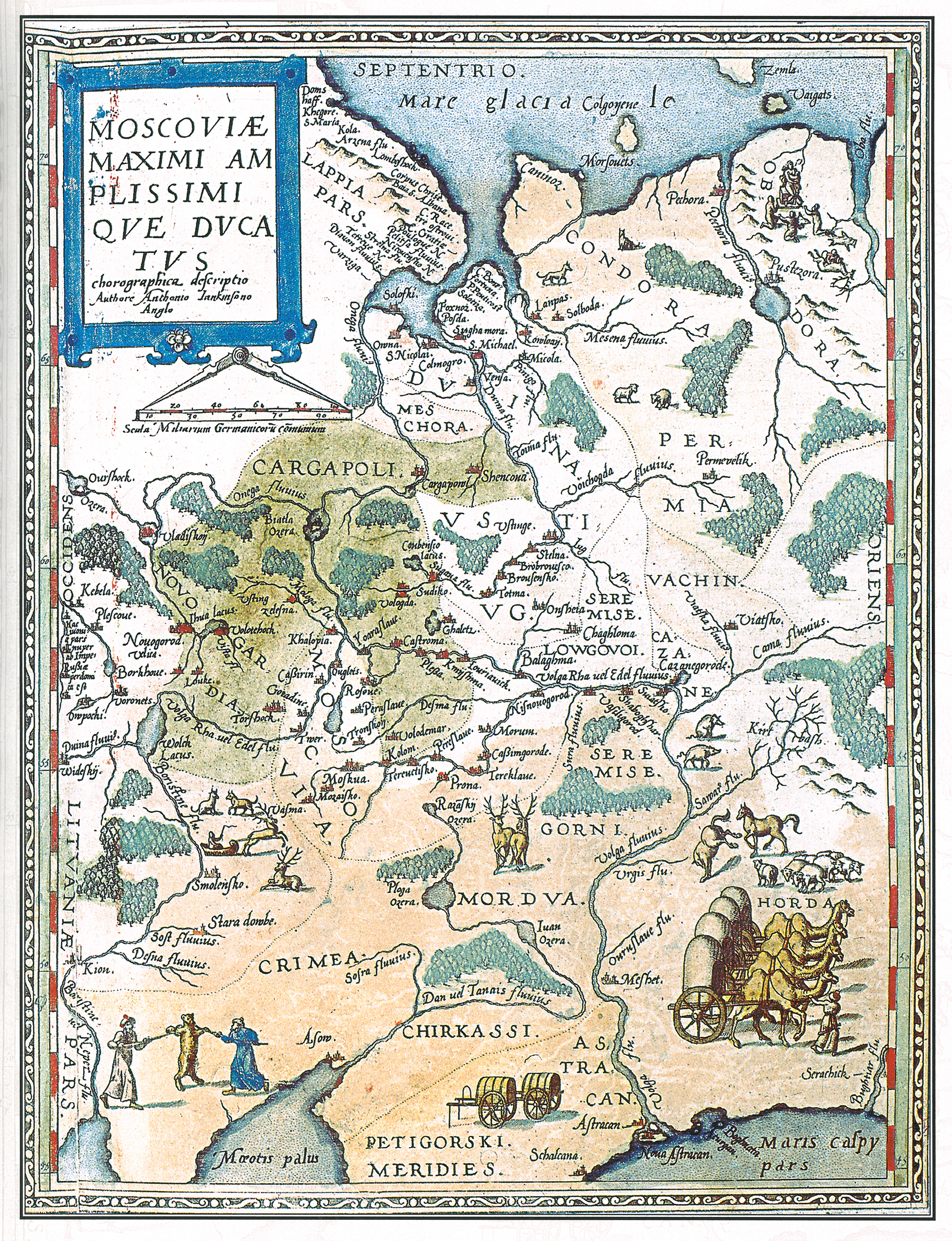
Map of Muscovy prepared by Anthony Jenkinson and Gerard de Jode (1593)

Anthony Jenkinson (1529 – 1610/1611) was born at Market Harborough, Leicestershire. He was one of the first Englishmen to explore Muscovy and present-day Russia. Jenkinson was a traveller and explorer on behalf of the Muscovy Company and the English crown. He also met Ivan the Terrible several times during his trips to Moscow and Russia. He detailed the accounts of his travel through several written works over his life.

== Family life ==
Anthony Jenkinson's father, William Jenkinson, was a man of great property and wealth. Anthony Jenkinson was thus trained in his earlier years for a mercantile career. By the year 1568, Jenkinson had become a pivotal researcher for the Muscovy Company. On 26 January 1568 Jenkinson married his wife Judith Marshe, daughter of John Marshe and his wife Alice. Marshe had extensive business ties, including being one of the founding members of the Company. Jenkinson thus benefited greatly through these financial ties. Jenkinson and his wife had six daughters and five sons, of whom only four daughters and a son survived. William Ross, based on his reading of Shakespeare's works, speculated that Jenkinson had an illegitimate daughter, Anne Beck or Whateley, who may at one point have been engaged to be married to William Shakespeare. No evidence was ever produced supporting Ross's conjectures, however. By 1606 Jenkinson was living in a manor house in Ashton. His wife died before him from a bad case of palsy. Jenkinson was buried on 16 February 1611 at Holy Trinity Church in Teigh, Rutland.

Anthony's son Sir Robert was the father of the first of the Jenkinson Baronets of Hawkesbury, Gloucestershire.

== Travels to Muscovy ==
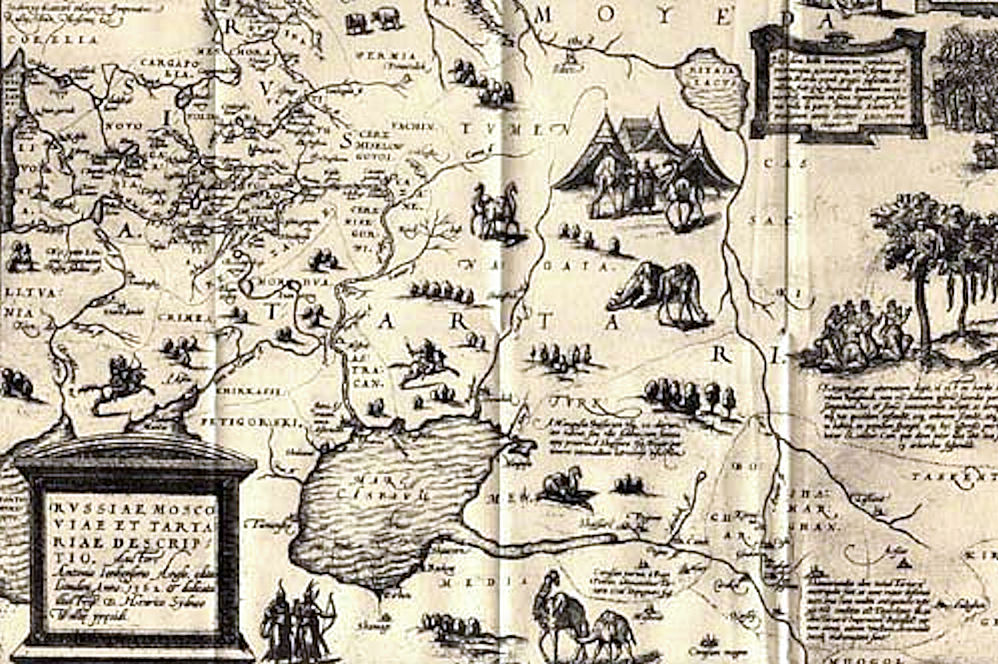
One of Jenkinson's maps of Russia (1562), depicting the regions surrounding the Caspian Sea.

Jenkinson travelled to Muscovy several times during his life on behalf of the Muscovy Company.

Following the establishment of official diplomatic relations and trade between Russia and England which had occurred with Richard Chancellor and the ship Edward Bonaventure, Anthony Jenkinson, who became the first English Ambassador to Russia in 1566, sailed from London, England, to land at Russia near the mouth of the Dvina River close to the convent of St. Nicholas at Nyonoksa. He was aboard the Primrose in charge of a fleet of four ships: the other three were the John the Evangelist, Anne, and Trinity. Of the previous ships which had sailed this route, the Edward Bonaventure was lost at sea in 1556 and both the Bona Confidentia and Bona Esperanza had been lost at sea in 1557 with only Philip and Mary returning to London in July 1557.

=== First Expedition, 1558 ===
Jenkinson was in Moscow in the year 1558. He began his journey by travelling south down the Oka and Volga Rivers, passing through the Khanate of Kazan (conquered by Russia in 1552), and arrived at the town of Astrakhan, (conquered 1556). His party continued their journey south-east after traveling across the Caspian Sea to Serachik (Serakhs), where they joined a merchant caravan and travelled for several months across the Tatar lands of the Nogai Horde. They reached Bokhara after fighting off bandits in the desert, but found that though the routes to China and India were well known, they were impassable due to wars and banditry along the way. The hostility of the local authorities made their stay precarious, and ultimately they were forced to retrace their steps, leaving Bokhara only shortly before the army of Samarkand arrived to besiege it. After many more hardships, including having to completely re-rig the boat they had left on the Caspian (making their own sails, ropes and cables), they arrived back in Moscow in 1559, but could not travel back to England until the spring of 1560 opened the sea passages again. On this journey, however, Jenkinson did manage to make a map of some of the Russian and Tatar territories, though he fell into the common mistake of assuming the Aral Sea was a gulf of the Caspian. His map was incorporated into Ortelius' atlas Theatrum orbis terrarum.

=== Aura Soltana ===
Jenkinson brought a young woman or child from Russia to England, who joined the court of Queen Elizabeth. Jenkinson wrote that her name was Aura Soltana and she later became known as Ippolyta. A pewter metal doll was bought for her to play with, and she was given gifts of lavish clothing, and some of the queen's old clothes.

=== Second Expedition, 1561 ===
Upon his arrival back from his first expedition into Russia, Jenkinson immediately began to prepare for a second expedition there. His intent was to travel to Russia and continue through to Persia. He arrived in Moscow in August 1561, with the intent to talk trade terms with Ivan the Terrible. However, he was not capable of having an audience with him until 15 March 1562. From there, Jenkinson travelled across Russia, down the Caspian and into Persia, where he reached the court of Shah Tahmasp, then at Qazvin, and managed to obtain preferential trading deals on behalf of the Muscovy Company. However, he found that the wider objective of breaking into the Indian Ocean trade was blocked by the Portuguese outpost at Ormuz on the Persian Gulf, and the sale of English goods was limited by competition from the Venetians operating via the much shorter route from the Mediterranean through Syria. Also during this expedition, he made a great impression on Ivan the Terrible who granted a large extension of trading rights to the Muscovy Company. In his travels into Central Asia and Persia, Jenkinson had a relationship of mutual advantage with the Tsar, buying commodities on the Tsar's behalf, but also benefiting from Ivan's letters of credence, which had considerable weight with local powers in the aftermath of Russia's triumphs at Kazan and Astrakhan. In July 1564 Jenkinson returned to London.

=== Service off the coast of Scotland, 1565 ===
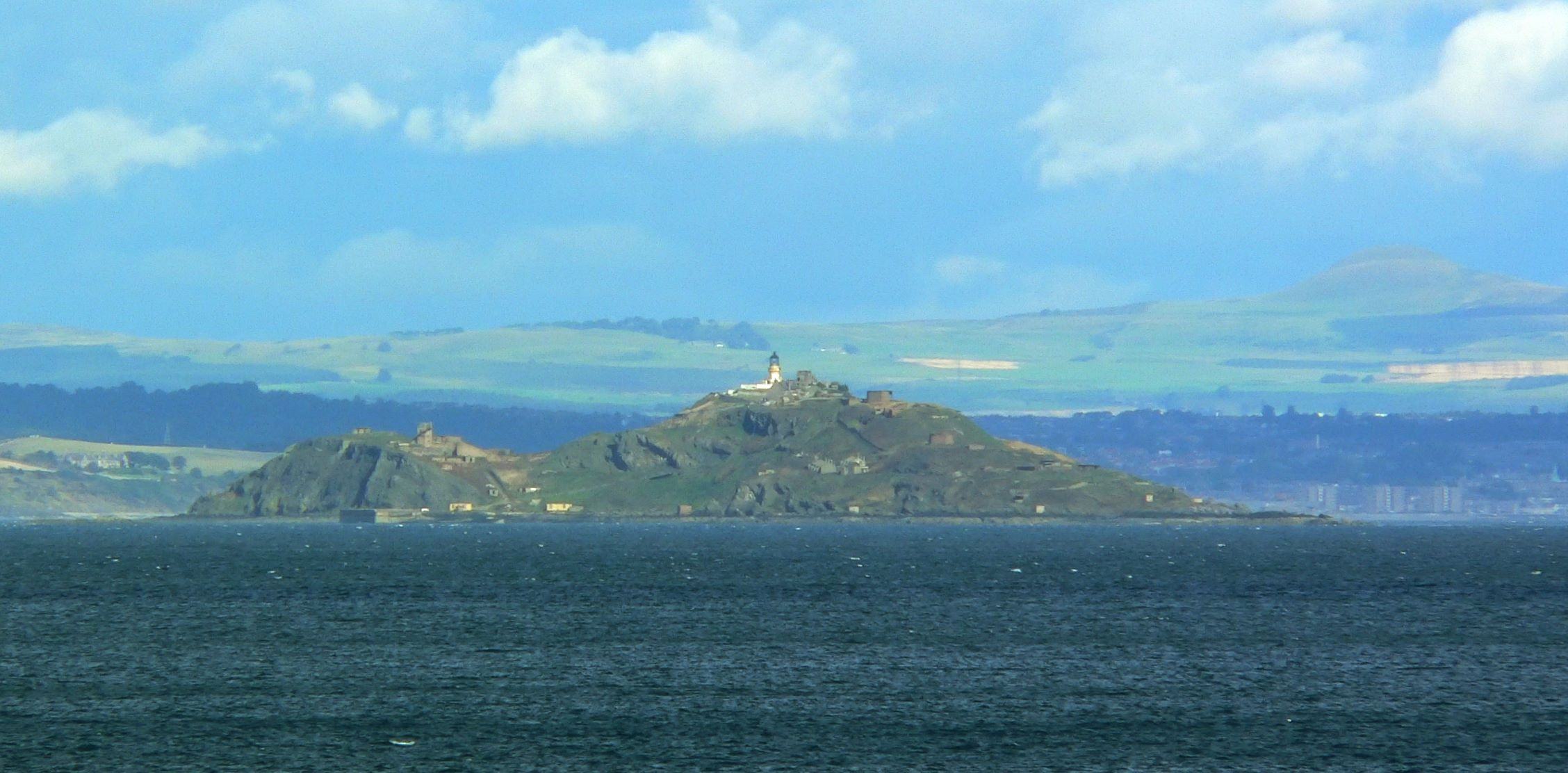
Jenkinson sailed into the range of the Scottish guns on Inchkeith in 1565

Jenkinson was sent in the Ayde to Scotland during the political crisis of the Chaseabout Raid. He sailed into the Firth of Forth on 25 September 1565. Jenkinson's mission was to blockade Leith to prevent Lord Seton landing munitions for Mary, Queen of Scots sent from France. An adverse wind brought him within range of the cannon of the fortress isle of Inchkeith. In the previous month, Lord Darnley had personally inspected the garrison and guns of the island.

Jenkinson had been ordered not to declare that he had been sent by the English government, and told the Scottish authorities that he was looking for pirates. Queen Mary sent aboard Anthony Standen with a present of a bow and arrows and a "box of conserve" for Queen Elizabeth and a gold chain worth 500 merks and a gilt cup for the captain, and he sailed back to Berwick-on-Tweed.

In October 1565 Jenkinson captured a ship belonging to Charles Wilson near Dunbar, frustrating a plan of the English diplomat in Scotland, Thomas Randolph. Wilson was intending to sail to Fife, Scotland and pick up Agnes Keith, the pregnant wife of the rebel Scottish Earl of Moray, and take her to England. Jenkinson's failure to blockade the Forth and his other activities resulted in a dispute with the Earl of Bedford who was England's leading diplomat in Scottish affairs

=== Third Expedition, 1566 ===
Jenkinson was sent to Russia for a third time in order to settle a dispute regarding the trade deals that England had made with Russia during Jenkinson's last voyage there in 1564. Upon his arrival, in a letter sent back to his friend, Jenkinson mentioned the cruelty that had swept over the Russian territories due to Ivan. In order to successfully negotiate the trade terms, Jenkinson was sent back to England. He was ordered to bring war experts to Russia to help Ivan with his wars. Due to this voyage, Jenkinson successfully negotiated new trade terms with the Russian monarch in September 1567.

=== Fourth Expedition, 1571 ===
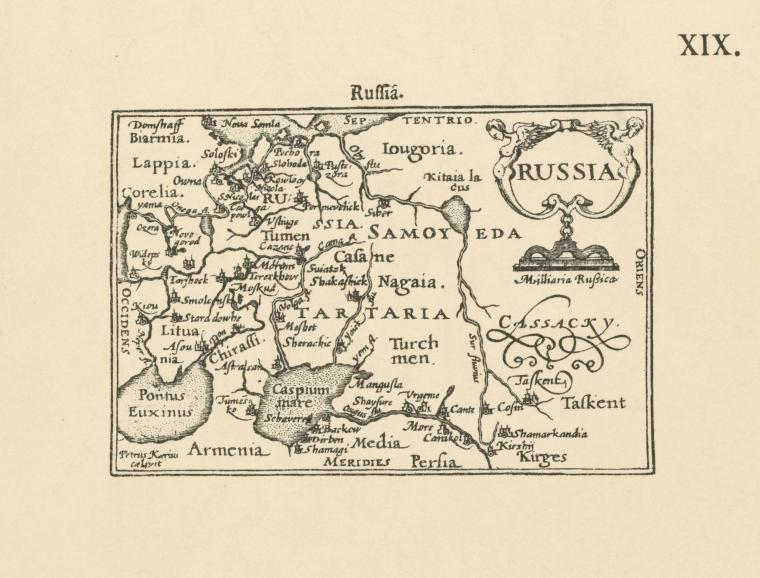
Map of Jenkinson, published in Amsterdam in 1598

In July 1571, Jenkinson was sent to Russia on his fourth and final expedition there. In 1568, Ivan had revoked the trading privileges that Jenkinson had successfully obtained in 1566. On behalf of Queen Elizabeth I, Jenkinson was sent to reinstate the trade agreement. After being held up at Kholmogory for six months due to plague, Jenkinson was finally able to arrive in Moscow by May 1572. During his voyage Jenkinson remarked on the devastation that the Crimean Tatars had committed upon parts of the country. By 23 July, Jenkinson had successfully reinstated all trading privileges with Ivan and Russia.

== Writings ==
Jenkinson's maps of Russia were incorporated into Ortelius' famous atlas Theatrum orbis terrarum. Also, historians have mined many of Jenkinson's surviving personal letters, in which he describes Russia. Particularly, he makes mention of Ivan's terrible and atrocious form of rule. Also, Jenkinson's travel accounts were used in Richard Hakluyt's compendium of geographic, trade and exploration material The Principal Navigations, Voyages, Traffiques and Discoveries of the English Nation.

== See also ==
- Chronology of European exploration of Asia
- List of foreign observers of Russia
- Anne Whateley

== Sources ==
- "Дженкинсон, Антон" . Brockhaus and Efron Encyclopedic Dictionary (in Russian). 1906.
