= Church of St Margaret, Thorne St Margaret =

Church in Somerset, England

Church of St Margaret
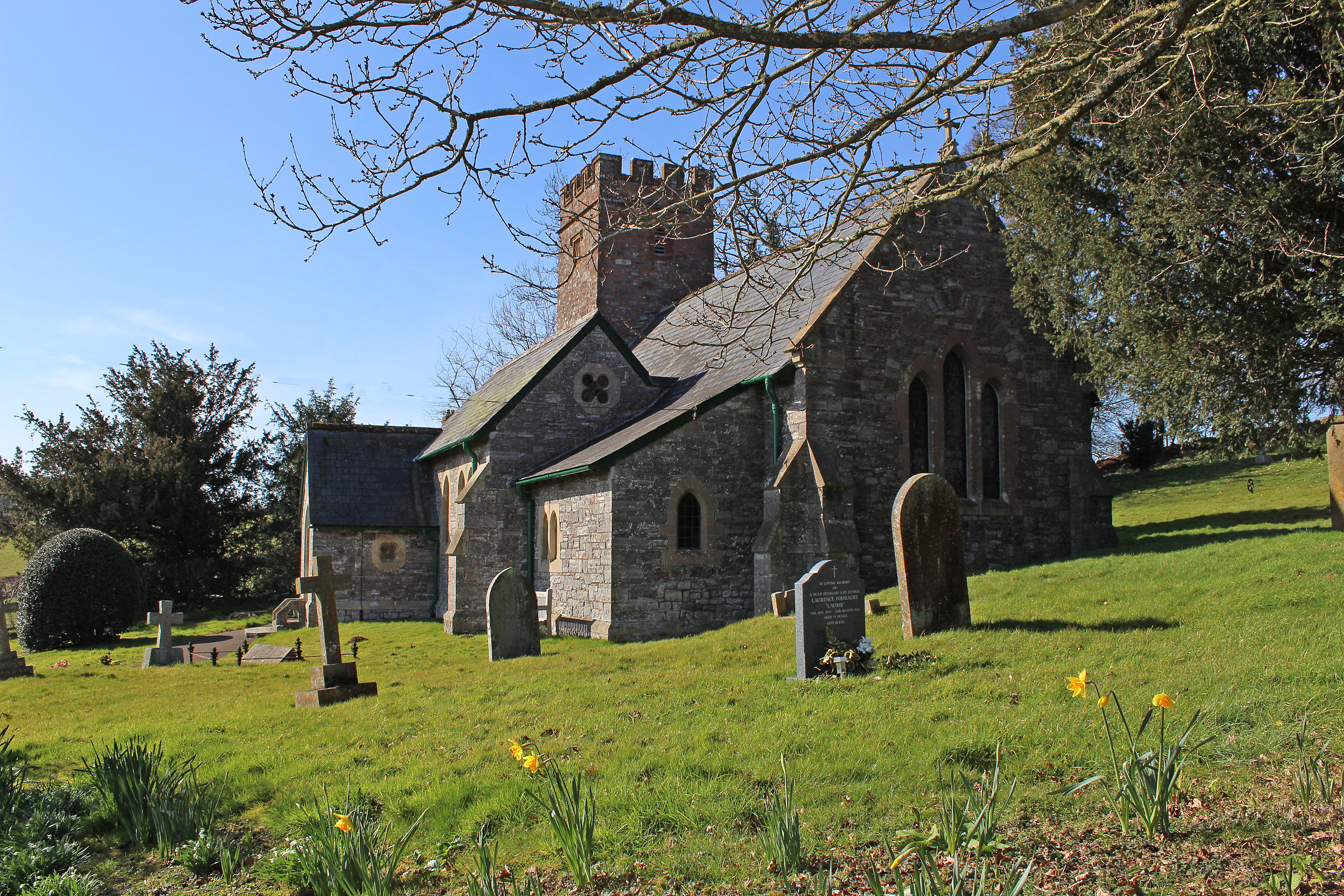

- Location within Somerset
- 50.9822°N 3.2854°W
- Location: Thorne St Margaret, Somerset, England

History
- Built: 15th century

Listed Building – Grade II*
- Official name: Church of St Margaret
- Designated: 25 January 1956
- Reference no.: 1180128

The Anglican Church of St Margaret in Thorne St Margaret, Somerset, England was built in the 15th century. It is a Grade II* listed building.

== History ==
The tower survives from the 15th century the rest of the church was subject to Victorian restoration undertaken in 1865 by Charles Edmund Giles, or Benjamin Ferrey. A west window, with stained glass was added in 1907.

The parish is part of the Wellington and District benefice within the Diocese of Bath and Wells.

== Architecture ==
The red sandstone building with hamstone dressings has a slate roof. It consists of a three-bay nave, a three-bay aisle with a south porch and a two-bay chancel. The two-stage tower is supported by diagonal buttresses.

Inside the church is a chalice shaped Saxon font, which was reinstalled in the church after being found in the churchyard.

== See also ==
- List of ecclesiastical parishes in the Diocese of Bath and Wells
