= Henry Tibbs =

English rector (1877–1943)

Henry Stanley Tibbs (1877 – 5 February 1943) was an Irish-British Anglican priest briefly interned in the Second World War under Defence Regulation 18B for his alleged pro-Nazi sympathies.

Henry Tibbs was the rector of the parish of Teigh, Rutland, England. On 8 July 1940, Tibbs was arrested after it was claimed that he was a fascist. He was released on 19 August, being considered harmless.

== Biography ==
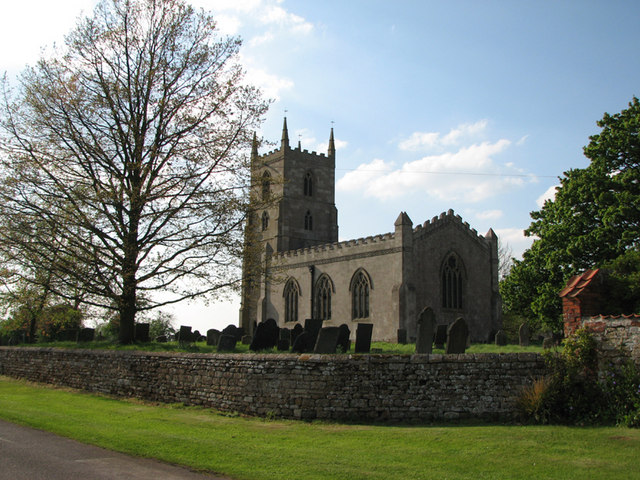
Holy Trinity, Teigh

Tibbs was born in King's County, Ireland and a graduate of Trinity College, Dublin. He married Evelyn Mary Livesey in England in 1904. Tibbs was the rector of Teigh from 1925, preaching to 72 people. During his time as parish priest, he became the subject of gossip and fell out with several people, some of whom started to spread rumours that he was a fascist.

Tibbs was arrested on 8 July 1940 and was sent to Liverpool Prison. Amongst the people who claimed he was a fascist was Douglas Bartlett, vicar of a neighbouring parish, an estranged friend of Tibbs. He claimed that Tibbs once hid two "members of the Gestapo" in his rectory and that he was "conveying his Nazi views to his parishioners which had now developed into a defeatist theme by describing the losses made by the enemy on our Naval forces as of a far more serious character than that disclosed by the British official reports." Bartlett also alleged that Tibbs said to his (Bartlett's) children that "Hitler and Goering were the finest men in the world".

Other people claimed that Tibbs said that Winston Churchill was, "a drug addict and a dictator of the vilest kind, in fact the worst dictator in the world and in the pay of the American Jews." He was also accused of saying that Germany was "our natural friend", that he had taken interest in local aerodromes and that "Tibbs substitutes Edward, Duke of Windsor for the name of the King."

When interrogated, Tibbs admitted that in 1935 he had been a member of the British Union of Fascists, but this was because of the party's agricultural policy. A son, John Dudley Montague Tibbs, an amateur boxer, was also in the BUF, but Tibbs claimed that he joined because of the uniform. Dudley Tibbs was also detained. Tibbs denied that he had been hosting members of the Gestapo, praised Hitler or called Churchill a drug addict. He said that local people would often be found "gaping" at the planes at RAF Cottesmore and he claimed that he mentioned the Duke of Windsor because, "I thought he wanted praying for as much as anyone else."

On 19 August the restrictions against Tibbs were revoked after he appealed. It was claimed that being "an Irishman" and that being "loquacious and eloquent", Tibbs would "let his tongue run away with him". The original detention however was felt justified. Tibbs returned to Teigh but never recovered from imprisonment. During his time in prison he caught pneumonia and said that "You have completely destroyed the life of an innocent man." He conducted his last service on 31 January 1943 and was buried ten days later.

It is now believed that Tibbs was detained unnecessarily, with most of the evidence against him being gossip.
