= Thankful Villages =

Villages whose armed force members all survived WWI

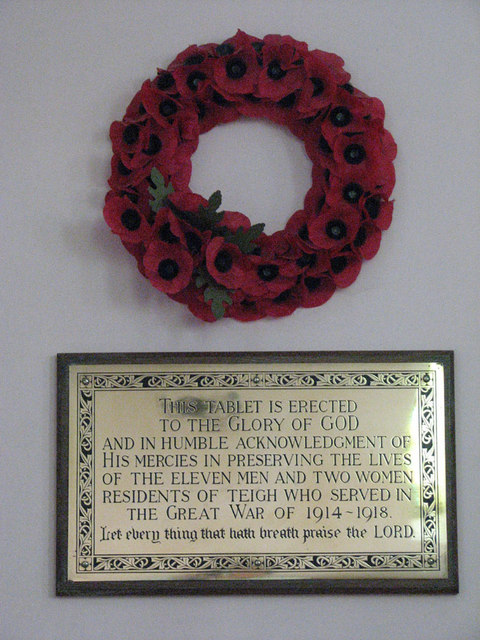
Memorial plaque in the parish church of Teigh

Thankful Villages (also known as Blessed Villages; Welsh: Pentrefi Diolchgar) are settlements in England and Wales from which all their members of the armed forces survived World War I. The term Thankful Village was popularised by the writer Arthur Mee in the 1930s; in Enchanted Land (1936), the introductory volume to The King's England series of guides, he wrote that a Thankful Village was one which had lost no men in the war because all those who left to serve came home again. His initial list identified 32 villages. There are tens of thousands of villages and towns in the United Kingdom.

In an October 2013 update, researchers identified 52 civil parishes in England and Wales from which all serving personnel returned. There are no Thankful Villages identified in Scotland or Ireland yet (all of Ireland was then part of the United Kingdom).

Fourteen of the English and Welsh villages are considered "doubly thankful", in that they also lost no service personnel during World War II. These are marked in italics in the list below (note: while the list includes 18 of these, not all have been verified).

== List of Thankful Villages ==
The researchers acknowledged a number of other villages which have been put forward as Thankful Villages but where they found there to be some uncertainty, generally over the place of residence of a serviceman.

=== England ===
Buckinghamshire

- Stoke Hammond

Cambridgeshire

- Toft

Cornwall

- Herodsfoot

Cumberland

- Ousby

Derbyshire

- Bradbourne

Dorset

- Langton Herring

Durham

- Hunstanworth

Essex

- Strethall

Gloucestershire

- Coln Rogers
- Little Sodbury has been verified as Twice Thankful and has been presented with a plaque to.confirm it
- Upper Slaughter

Herefordshire

- Knill
- Middleton-on-the-Hill

Hertfordshire

- Puttenham

Kent

- Knowlton

Lancashire

- Arkholme
- Nether Kellet

Leicestershire

- Saxby
- East Norton
- Stretton en le Field

Lincolnshire

- Bigby
- Flixborough
- High Toynton
- Minting
- Allington

Northamptonshire

- East Carlton
- Woodend

Northumberland

- Meldon

Nottinghamshire

- Cromwell
- Maplebeck
- Wigsley
- Wysall

Rutland

- Teigh

Shropshire

- Harley

Somerset

- Aisholt
- Chantry
- Chelwood
- Holywell Lake
- Rodney Stoke
- Stocklinch
- Tellisford
- Woolley

Staffordshire

- Butterton

Suffolk

- Culpho
- Wordwell
- South Elmham St Michael

Sussex

- East Wittering

Yorkshire

- Catwick
- Cundall
- Helperthorpe
- Norton-le-Clay
- Scruton

=== Wales ===
Ceredigion

- Llanfihangel y Creuddyn

Glamorgan

- Colwinston/Tregolwyn

Pembrokeshire

- Herbrandston

Tavernspite, in Pembrokeshire, has been mooted as a fourth doubly thankful village in Wales.

== France ==
In France, where the human cost of war was higher than in Britain, there were only twelve villages in all of France with no men lost from World War I. One of these, Thierville, also suffered no losses in the Franco-Prussian War and World War II, France's other bloody wars of the modern era.

== In popular culture ==
Between 2016 and 2018, singer-songwriter Darren Hayman released a trilogy of albums inspired by and written in-situ at the Thankful Villages. 54 villages were covered, including Welbury, North Yorkshire, not in the 52 listed above.
