= Norton-le-Clay =

Village and civil parish in North Yorkshire, England

Coordinates: 54.134180°N 1.386020°W

- Location within North Yorkshire
- Population: 497 (2011 Census)
- OS grid reference: SE402711
- Civil parish: Norton-le-Clay
- Unitary authority: North Yorkshire
- Ceremonial county: North Yorkshire
- Region: Yorkshire and the Humber
- Country: England
- Sovereign state: United Kingdom
- Post town: YORK
- Postcode district: YO61
- Police: North Yorkshire
- Fire: North Yorkshire
- Ambulance: Yorkshire

Norton-le-Clay is a village and civil parish in the county of North Yorkshire, England.

== Geography ==
It is situated near the A1(M) motorway and 2 miles (3.2 km) north-west of Boroughbridge. From 1974 to 2023 it was part of the Borough of Harrogate, it is now administered by the unitary North Yorkshire Council.

== History ==
It is one of the Thankful Villages that suffered no fatalities during the Great War of 1914 to 1918. The village was featured on Darren Hayman's album, Thankful Villages Volume 2.

=== 1973 mid-air collision ===
There was a mid-air collision on Monday 7 May 1973, where a pilot in BAC Jet Provost ejected; the Jet Provost aircraft killed two people when it crashed.

Flt Lt M G Saunders was the pilot in Jet Provost XR647, and Flt Lt Wayne Durham was the navigator; both ejected. In the other Jet Provost XS216 was Flt Lt Richard Wallis and Flying Officer Derek Sage

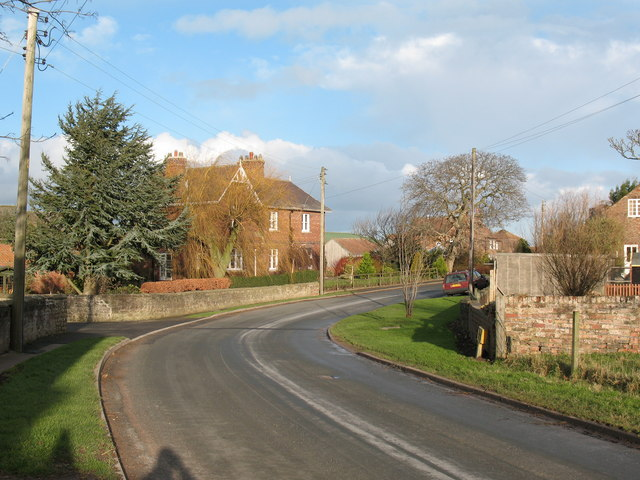
The south-west end of Norton-le-Clay
