= Bandana (disambiguation) =

A bandana is a cloth also known as a kerchief.

Bandana or bandanna may also refer to:

- Bandana (pop band)
- Bandana (country band)
- Bandana, Kentucky, a small town in the United States
- Bandana (album), second studio album by hip hop duo MadGibbs
- Bandanna, Pennsylvania, unincorporated area in York County, Pennsylvania, United States
- Bandanna (opera) by Daron Hagen
- Bandana (song), a single by Fireboy DML and Asake

== See also ==
- Y Bandana, a Welsh alternative rock band
  - Y Bandana (album), their self-titled debut album
- Vandana (disambiguation)
