= Coat of arms of the United Kingdom =

Versions
- The royal coat of arms in Scotland
- Armiger: Monarch of the United Kingdom
- Adopted: 1837
- Crest: Upon the helm, the imperial crown proper thereon a lion statant guardant Or langued Gules armed Argent, imperially crowned Proper; mantled Or doubled Ermine (Scottish version): Upon the Royal helm the crown of Scotland proper, thereon a lion sejant affronté Gules armed and langued Azure, imperially crowned proper holding in his dexter paw a sword and in his sinister a sceptre, both proper
- Shield: Quarterly, I and IV Gules, three lions passant guardant in pale Or langued and armed Azure. II Or a lion rampant Gules armed and langued Azure within a double tressure flory-counter-flory Gules. III Azure a harp Or stringed Argent. (Scottish version): Quarterly, I and IV Or a lion rampant Gules armed and langued Azure within a double tressure flory-counter-flory Gules. II Gules, three lions passant guardant in pale Or langued and armed Azure. III Azure a harp Or stringed Argent.
- Supporters: On the dexter a lion rampant guardant Or langued and armed Gules, imperially crowned Proper. On the sinister a Unicorn rampant Argent armed crined and unguled Or, and gorged with a Coronet composed of crosses patee and fleurs-de-lis, a chain affixed thereto passing through the forelegs and reflexed over the back Or (Scottish version): Dexter a unicorn Argent imperially crowned proper, armed, crined and unguled Or, gorged with a coronet Or composed of crosses patée and fleurs de lis a chain affixed thereto passing between the forelegs and reflexed over the back also Or holding the standard of Saint Andrew, sinister a lion rampant gardant Or imperially crowned proper holding the standard of Saint George
- Compartment: Tudor rose, Shamrock, Thistle (Scottish version): Thistles
- Motto: Dieu et mon droit (Scottish version): In defens and Nemo me impune lacessit
- Order: Order of the Garter (Scottish version): Order of the Thistle
- Earlier version: See below

The coat of arms of the United Kingdom, also referred to as the royal arms, are the arms of dominion of the British monarch, currently Charles III. They are used by the Government of the United Kingdom and by other Crown institutions, including courts in the United Kingdom and in some parts of the Commonwealth. Differenced versions of the arms are used by members of the British royal family. The monarch's official flag, the royal standard, is the coat of arms in flag form.

There are two versions of the coat of arms. One is used in Scotland and includes elements derived from the coat of arms of the Kingdom of Scotland, and the other is used elsewhere and includes elements derived from the coat of arms of the Kingdom of England. The shields of both versions of the arms quarter the arms of the kingdoms of England and Scotland, which united to form the Kingdom of Great Britain in 1707, and the Kingdom of Ireland, which united with Great Britain to form the United Kingdom in 1801. The Irish quarter was unaltered following the division of Ireland into Northern Ireland and the Irish Free State in 1922.

The present arms do not include a representation of the United Kingdom's fourth constituent country, Wales. It is instead represented heraldically by two royal badges, which use the Welsh dragon and the coat of arms of Llywelyn ab Iorwerth respectively.

== Description ==
=== Outside Scotland ===
At the centre of the arms is a quartered shield, depicting the three passant guardant lions of England in the first and fourth quarters, the rampant lion and double tressure flory-counterflory of Scotland in the second quarter, and a harp for Ireland in the third quarter. Surrounding the shield is the Order of the Garter, the United Kingdom's most senior order of knighthood. The supporters are a crowned English lion on the dexter (heraldic right), and a chained Scottish unicorn on the sinister (heraldic left). Above the shield is a gold helmet, which has mantling of gold and ermine attached to it. On top of this is the crest, a crown with a crowned lion standing on it. Below the shield is a grassy mound, a type of compartment, on which are thistles, Tudor roses and shamrocks, representing Scotland, England and Ireland respectively. In front of this is the motto Dieu et mon droit, a French phrase meaning 'God and my right'.

=== In Scotland ===
The royal arms in Scotland use the same basic elements, but with distinctive Scottish symbolism. In the shield the Scottish arms occupy the first and fourth quarters and the English arms the second, giving the former precedence. The shield is surrounded by the collar and badge of the Order of the Thistle. The crest is a crowned red lion holding a sword and sceptre (representing the Honours of Scotland), facing forward sitting on a crown. Above it is the Scots motto 'In defens', a contraction of the phrase 'In my defens God me defend'. The supporters are a crowned and chained Scottish unicorn on the dexter, and a crowned English lion on the sinister. Between each supporter and the shield is a lance displaying the flag of their respective kingdom. The grassy mound beneath the shield contains only thistles; on it is a second motto, that of the Order of the Thistle: Nemo me impune lacessit (no one will attack me with impunity). The crowns in the Scottish version of the arms are conventionally stylised to resemble the crown of Scotland.

=== Blazon ===
Changes to the blazon of the royal arms are in the royal prerogative, presumed to be under ministerial advice.

This table breaks down the blazons to enable comparison of the differences between the general arms and the arms used in Scotland.

	Outside Scotland	In Scotland
Quarters I & IV	Gules three lions passant guardant in pale or armed and langued azure (for England)	Or a lion rampant gules armed and langued azure within a double tressure flory-counter-flory of the second (for Scotland)
Quarter II	Or a lion rampant gules armed and langued azure within a double tressure flory-counter-flory of the second (for Scotland)	Gules three lions passant guardant in pale or armed and langued azure (for England)
Quarter III	Azure a harp or stringed argent (for Ireland)	
Surrounded by	The Garter circlet	The collar of the Order of the Thistle
Crest	Upon the Royal helm the imperial crown proper, thereon a lion statant guardant or imperially crowned proper	Upon the Royal helm the crown of Scotland proper, thereon a lion sejant affronté gules armed and langued azure, imperially crowned proper holding in his dexter paw a sword and in his sinister a sceptre, both proper
Supporters	Dexter a lion rampant guardant or imperially crowned proper, sinister a unicorn argent, armed, crined and unguled or, gorged with a coronet or composed of crosses patée and fleurs de lis a chain affixed thereto passing between the forelegs and reflexed over the back also or	Dexter a unicorn argent imperially crowned proper, armed, crined and unguled or, gorged with a coronet or composed of crosses patée and fleurs de lis a chain affixed thereto passing between the forelegs and reflexed over the back also or holding the standard of Saint Andrew, sinister a lion rampant guardant or imperially crowned proper holding the standard of Saint George
Motto	Dieu et mon droit (French)	In defens (Scots)
Order Motto	Garter: Honi soit qui mal y pense (Anglo-Norman)	Thistle: Nemo me impune lacessit (Latin)
Plants on the compartment	Roses, thistles and shamrocks (on the same stem)	Thistles only

== History ==
=== Arms of England, Scotland and Ireland ===
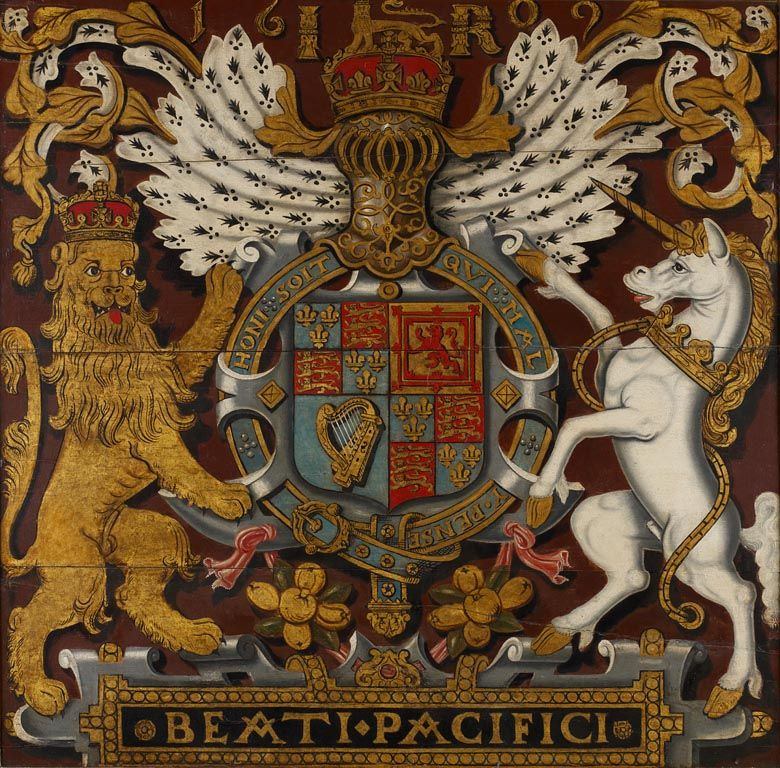
The arms of James VI and I outside Scotland

The present royal arms originated in the separate arms of the kingdoms of England, Scotland and Ireland; Wales had been incorporated into the Kingdom of England in the 16th century. (Note: A Welsh dragon was used as a supporter by the Tudor monarchs, who were of Welsh descent, but this was replaced with the current Scottish unicorn when the Stuart dynasty inherited the throne. In the 20th century, the arms of the principality of Wales were added as an inescutcheon to the coat of arms of the Prince of Wales, and a banner of those arms with a green inescutcheon bearing the prince's crown is flown as his personal standard in Wales. There is also a Royal Badge of Wales, which include the arms of the principality and which is used, among other things, on the cover of Acts of the Welsh Parliament.) In 1603, James VI of Scotland inherited the English and Irish thrones, and, to symbolise this union of the crowns, the arms of England (which at that time were quartered with those of France) and Ireland were quartered with those of Scotland. Within Scotland, the Scottish arms were placed in the first and fourth quarters and those of England in the second, with the English arms taking precedence elsewhere.

Except during the Commonwealth and the Protectorate in the mid-seventeenth century, and the use by William III of an inescutcheon of Nassau, the arms remained unchanged until the creation of the Kingdom of Great Britain in 1707.

=== Great Britain ===
The Acts of Union 1707 united the two kingdoms of England and Scotland into one Kingdom of Great Britain. The arms of the new kingdom impaled England and Scotland in the first and fourth quarters, representing their union, with France in the second and Ireland in the third. In 1714, the Elector of Hanover, George I, became king, and the arms of Hanover were placed in the fourth quarter.

=== United Kingdom ===
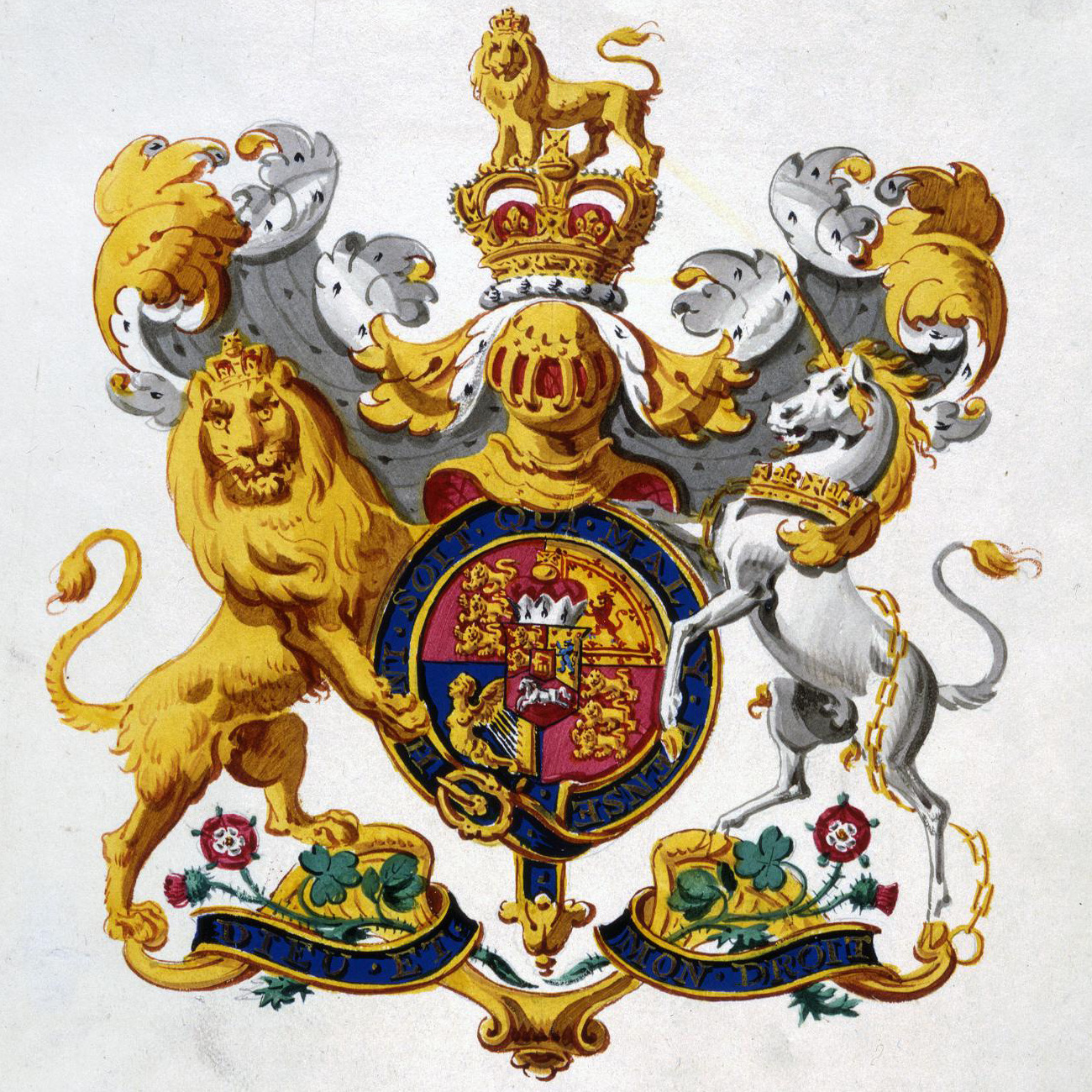
Illustration of the royal arms prepared by the College of Arms for the approval of George III, in use from 1801 to 1816.

In 1801, Great Britain and Ireland were united to form the United Kingdom; the monarch's claim to the French throne was at the same time dropped, and the French quarter removed from the coat of arms. The remaining quarters were rearranged so that, outside Scotland, England occupied the first and fourth, Scotland the second, Ireland the third, and Hanover an inescutcheon topped by an electoral bonnet. Within Scotland, the Scottish and English quarters were reversed. In 1816, the electorate of Hanover became a kingdom, and the bonnet was replaced with a crown.

In 1837, Victoria became Queen of the United Kingdom, but not of Hanover, as the latter followed Salic law which barred women from the succession. The Hanoverian inescutcheon was therefore removed, and the royal arms reached the form they have retained to the present. The only changes since have been cosmetic, such as altering the depiction of the Irish harp so that it no longer includes a bare-breasted woman.

==== Development ====
Royal coats of arms of the United Kingdom
Arms	Dates	Details	Commons
	1801–1816	The Acts of Union 1800 united the Kingdom of Great Britain and the Kingdom of Ireland to create the United Kingdom of Great Britain and Ireland. At the same time, George III abandoned his claim to the French throne and the fleur-de-lis was removed. For the Electorate of Hanover, there is an inescutcheon surmounted by the electoral bonnet.	
	1816–1837	The electoral bonnet on the inescutcheon was replaced by a crown in 1816, as Hanover had been declared a kingdom two years prior.	
	1837–present	The accession of Queen Victoria ended the personal union between the United Kingdom and Hanover, as Salic law prevented a woman from ascending the Hanoverian throne, and the inescutcheon of the arms of Hanover was removed. The new arms were announced in The London Gazette on 26 July 1837 and first used in The Gazette on 8 August 1837. This was the final change to the blazon of the royal arms and all later adaptions were purely stylistic. On his succession in 1901, Edward VII had considered adding the Arms of Saxony as an inescutcheon as he had done when Prince of Wales, and also a representation for Wales, but he was dissuaded by officials. There were also unsuccessful calls for some representation of the wider British Empire. The Irish harp remained despite the Partition of Ireland in 1921.	

==== Changing styles ====
The blazon of the royal arms has been changed only three times since the creation of the United Kingdom: in 1801, 1816 and 1837. However, the depictions of these blazons have been subject to artistic interpretation and the preferences of the monarch under the royal prerogative. (Note: In heraldry, any artistic interpretation is considered to be correct provided it adheres to the written description given in the blazon.)

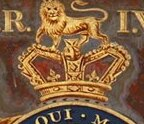
Detail of a depiction of the royal arms from the reign of George IV (1820–1830)

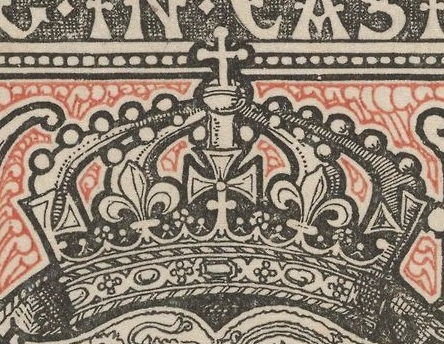
Detail of a bookplate used by Queen Victoria (1837–1901)

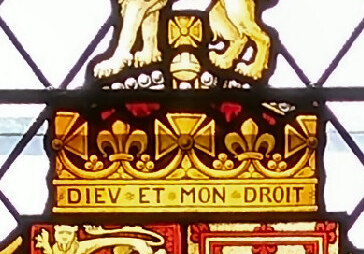
Detail of a stained glass window depicting the royal arms during the reign of Edward VII (1901–1910)

The blazons of the royal arms do not specify any particular heraldic crown to be depicted in the achievement, using only the term "imperial crown proper" to indicate a crown with arches and in its natural colours. (Note: Although the cap of the heraldic crown is always represented as crimson even though the cap of the real crown is of purple velvet.)

The actual form of the crown has varied over time. In England, the heraldic crown is ultimately based on St Edward's Crown, which has four crosses pattée and four fleurs-de-lis around the rim and two arches. However, depictions have varied depending on the artist. Queen Victoria, for example, favoured a crown with rounded arches of "the type of an earlier time" from at least the 1860s, (Note: Victoria had featured in William Wyon's gothic crown coin in 1847, and the Palace of Westminster, rebuilt from 1840–1876, makes extensive use of a gothic style crown. The British had assumed direct rule over India in 1858 and the Order of the Star of India, created in 1861, depicted a Tudor Crown from its inception. Victoria had a new crown made in 1870 which resembled the Tudor Crown, declining to wear the Imperial State Crown which she found heavy and uncomfortable.) and in about 1880, after she was proclaimed Empress of India, the heraldic crown was altered to give it a more imperial form by making the arches semi-circular.

After the accession of Edward VII, the War Office raised the issue of a standardised design of the crown for use by the British Army, as several crowns of different patterns were in use. In 1901, the king decided on a "Tudor" crown design based on the crown of Henry VII, as "chosen and always used by Queen Victoria personally". This style was used until after the accession of Elizabeth II in 1952, when the design reverted to a style with depressed arches used by Charles II. The design was updated again after the accession of Charles III, to a design similar to that adopted in 1901.

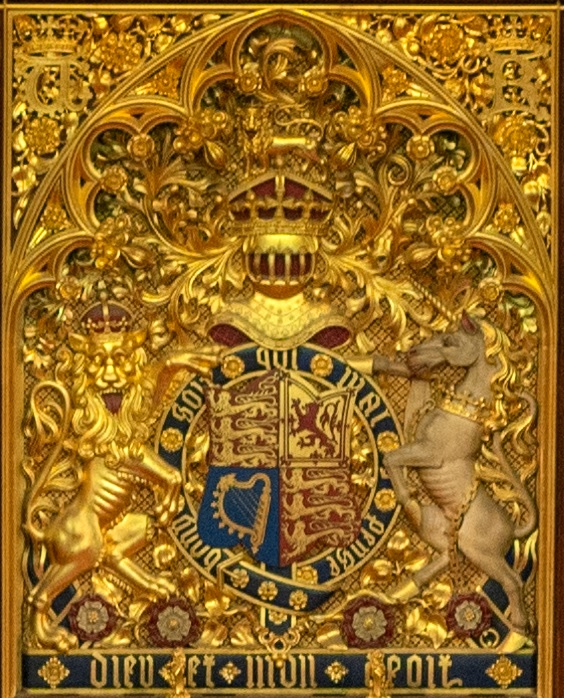
A non-winged harp in a depiction of the royal arms from the reign of Queen Victoria (1837-1901) in the House of Lords chamber

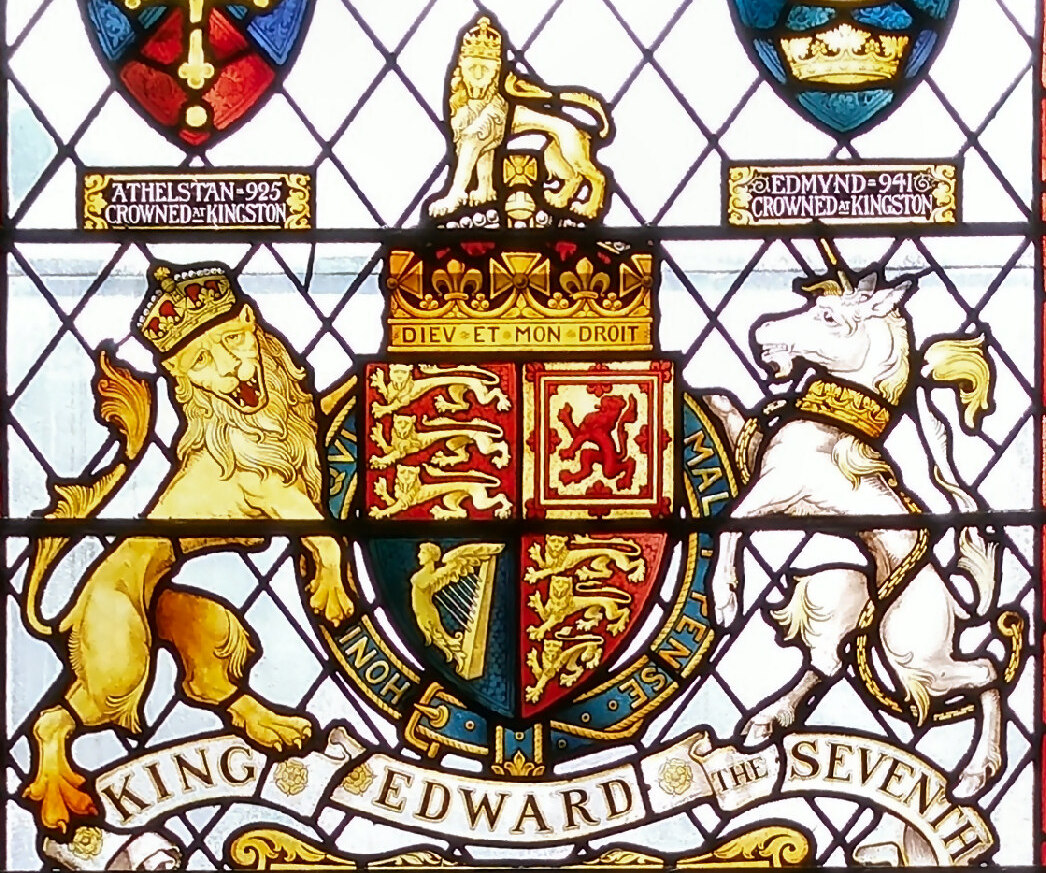
A winged harp in a depiction of the royal arms from the reign of Edward VII (1901-1910) in Kingston Museum

There have also been changes to the depiction of the Irish harp, with the frame variously depicted as a winged woman or as a Celtic harp. The latter became more common in twentieth century.

== Usage ==
=== Restrictions ===
The royal arms are the arms of dominion of the British monarch. Unlike ordinary armorial bearings, they are not hereditary. The right to bear them is vested in the reigning sovereign and, by extension, their government as a royal prerogative. Members of the royal family are granted differenced arms.

Crown copyright applies in perpetuity to depictions of the royal arms and its constituent parts under the royal prerogative, and The National Archives restricts rights to reproduce them or to display them in film, television or theatre productions. Although Crown copyright usually expires 50 years after publication, Section 171(b) of the Copyright, Designs and Patents Act 1988 made an exception for 'any right or privilege of the Crown' not written in an act of parliament, thus preserving the rights of the Crown under the unwritten royal prerogative.

In addition, use of the royal arms and devices for commercial purposes is specifically restricted in the UK (and in countries which are party to the Paris Convention) under sections 4 and 99 of the Trade Marks Act 1994, and its use is governed by the Lord Chamberlain's Office.

The royal arms may be displayed by holders of a royal warrant but may not be used as a trade mark and should only be displayed for the duration of the grant of a royal warrant. It is an offence under Section 12 of the Trade Descriptions Act 1968 to give a false indication that any goods or services are supplied to the monarch or any member of the royal family.

=== UK usage ===
==== Government ====
Lesser Arms

As used on government websites and in departmental insignia

Version used by the Scotland Office

As used on the front cover of British passports and acts of parliament

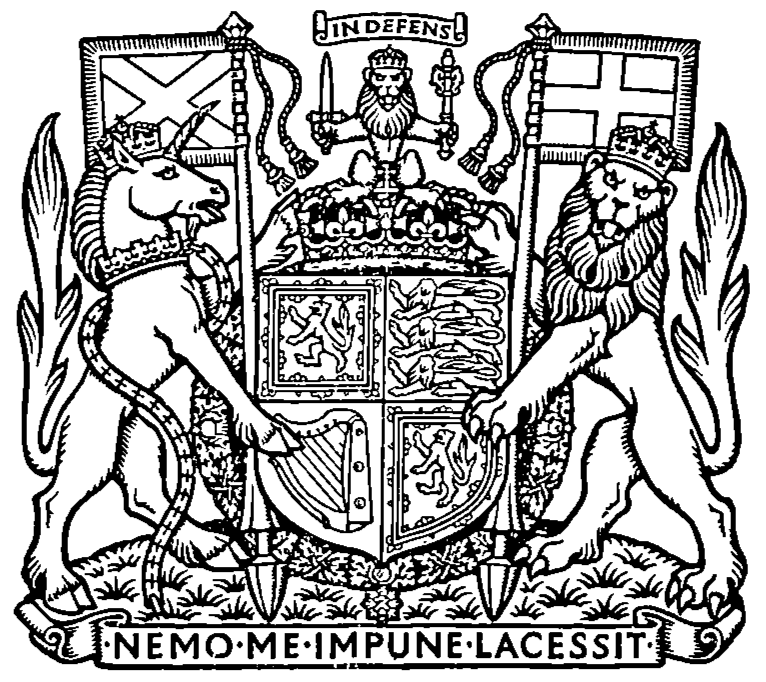
As used on the cover of Acts of the Scottish Parliament

Royal Coat of Arms used by HM Government until 2022

The UK Government generally uses a simplified, or "lesser", form of the arms that omits the helm and mantling, reduces the crest to the crown alone, and has no compartment. Use of the royal arms by government departments and agencies is governed by the Cabinet Office.

The royal arms feature on all acts of parliament, in the logos of government departments, on the cover of all UK passports (and passports issued in other British territories and dependencies), as an inescutcheon on the diplomatic flags of British Ambassadors, and on The London Gazette. It is also used in the British Overseas Territories, namely on all acts of the Anguilla House of Assembly and by the administrations of Akrotiri and Dhekelia, the Pitcairn Islands, and South Georgia and the South Sandwich Islands.

The Scotland Office and the Advocate General for Scotland use the Scottish version of the arms, again without the helm or crest. The simplified Scottish royal arms were used as the day-to-day logo of the Scottish Executive until September 2007, when the body was rebranded as the Scottish Government and began using a logo incorporating the flag of Scotland. The Scottish Government continues to use the arms on some official documents, including acts of the Scottish Parliament.

==== Judicial ====
The royal arms appear in courtrooms in England and Wales, typically behind the judge's bench, and symbolise that justice comes from the monarch. One exception is the magistrates' court in the City of London, where both the royal arms and arms of the City of London Corporation appear behind the bench. Courtrooms in Scotland, in the same way, usually display the Scottish version of the royal arms. The Justice (Northern Ireland) Act 2002 prohibited the display of the royal arms in courtrooms or on court building exteriors in Northern Ireland, with some exceptions. (Note: The Royal Courts of Justice in Belfast, the courts in Armagh, Banbridge, Downpatrick, Magherafelt, Omagh, and the exterior of court buildings that had them in place prior to the enactment of the Act.)

The arms are not displayed in the Middlesex Guildhall, which houses the Supreme Court of the United Kingdom and the Judicial Committee of the Privy Council. This is because the remit of the former includes the four nations of the UK, and the latter is the final court of appeal for three independent republics and the independent sultanate of Brunei, which do not recognise the judicial authority of the British monarch as their head of state, as well as for various British territories and sovereign bases, the Crown dependencies, and other independent Commonwealth realms where the king is the head of state but separated from the judicial authority.

==== Royal Standard ====
A banner of the royal arms, known as the royal standard, is flown from buildings in which the monarch is resident or present. The Palace of Westminster, for example, usually flies the Union Flag, but flies the royal standard when the monarch is present for the State Opening of Parliament. When the monarch is not in residence at a palace in Scotland the royal banner of Scotland is flown; palaces in the rest of the UK fly the Union Flag.

==== Heraldry ====
The royal arms feature on the tabard worn by officers of arms of the College of Arms and Court of the Lord Lyon. These garments are worn at several traditional ceremonies, such as the annual procession and service of the Order of the Garter at Windsor Castle, the State Opening of Parliament, the coronation, and state funerals.

==== Coinage ====
The royal arms regularly feature on British coinage, and are used as a logo by the Royal Mint. In 2008 a new series of designs for all seven coins of £1 and below was unveiled by the Royal Mint, every one of which is drawn from the royal arms. The full royal arms appear on the one pound coin, and sections appear on each of the other six, which combine to form a complete depiction.

==== Armed Forces ====
The royal arms with the crest but without the helm is used as the rank insignia for class 1 warrant officers in His Majesty's Armed Forces.

==== Ecclesiastical ====
It is customary (but not mandatory) for churches of the Church of England and Church of Scotland to display the royal arms as the established church of England and the national church of Scotland respectively. If a church building of either denomination does not currently display the royal arms, permission from the Crown must be given before one can be used.

==== Corporate ====
The Times masthead

Use of the royal arms and devices for commercial purposes is specifically restricted in the UK (and in countries which are party to the Paris Convention) under sections 4 and 99 of the Trade Marks Act 1994, and its use is governed by the Lord Chamberlain's Office.

The royal arms may be displayed by select businesses which supply the royal household with goods or services and have been granted a royal warrant. But the arms may not be used as a trade mark and should only be displayed for the duration of the grant of a royal warrant. It is an offence under Section 12 of the Trade Descriptions Act 1968 to give a false indication that any goods or services are supplied to the monarch or any member of the royal family.

The royal arms are incorporated into Imperial College London's coat of arms, which developed from institutions founded and patronised by Queen Victoria and Albert, Prince Consort.

=== Commonwealth usage ===
==== Bahamas ====
The office of the Governor-General of the Bahamas uses the lesser version of the British royal arms.

==== Canada ====
Several provincial and territorial courts in Canada make use of the royal arms:

- The Supreme Court, Court of Appeal and Provincial Court of British Columbia
- The Court of Appeal for Ontario and some older courts in Ontario.
- The Supreme Court of Newfoundland and Labrador and Court of Appeal of Newfoundland and Labrador
- The Supreme Court of Yukon and the Court of Appeal of Yukon
- The Supreme Court of Prince Edward Island and the Court of Appeal of Prince Edward Island

The coat of arms of Canada is also closely modelled on the royal arms of the United Kingdom.

==== Australia ====
In Australia, the royal arms are used as a logo by the Parliament of Victoria and the Western Australian Legislative Council. It is also used by several state and federal courts, including:

- The seal of the Supreme Court of South Australia
- The Supreme Court of Victoria
- The Supreme Court of Tasmania
- The High Court of Australia, depicted alongside the Commonwealth Coat of Arms at the building's entrance
- Court rooms in New South Wales where the royal arms may not be removed for practical or heritage reasons

The current royal arms are also used by Australian newspaper The Age.

==== New Zealand ====
The New Zealand Gazette displayed the royal arms until 1946. The newspaper The Press used the royal arms as its masthead until 2023.

==== Irish Free State ====
Historically, when the Irish Free State established its own diplomatic seals in the 1930s, the royal arms were depicted on the throne behind George V in a unique form by having the Irish harp in two quarters and the English arms in one.

== Royal family ==
Members of the British royal family are granted their own personal arms. They do not inherit them by right, as the arms are the arms of the kingdom. In the past, the monarch's younger sons used various differences; and married daughters of the monarch impaled the plain royal arms with their husbands' arms. But for many centuries now, all members of the royal family have had differenced versions of the royal arms settled on them by royal warrant. Only children and grandchildren in the male line of the monarch are entitled to arms in this fashion: the arms of children of the monarch are differenced with a three-point label; while grandchildren of the monarch are differenced with a five-point label. An exception is made for the eldest son of the Prince of Wales, who also bears a three-point label. The labels are always white (argent) and each prince or princess has individual marks to form his or her particular difference, except the Prince of Wales, who uses a plain white three-pointed label. Since 1911, the arms of the Prince of Wales also displays an inescutcheon of the ancient arms of the Principality of Wales.

Queens consort and the wives of sons of the monarch also have their own personal coat of arms. Typically this will be the arms of their husband impaled with their own personal arms or those of their father, if armigerous. However, the consorts of a queen regnant are not entitled to use the royal arms. Thus Prince Philip, Duke of Edinburgh, was granted his own personal arms. A notable exception to this rule was Prince Albert, who used the royal arms (differenced by a special label) quartered with his own Saxon royal arms.

Currently the following members of the royal family have their own arms based on the royal arms:

Children and grandchildren of the monarch in the male line
Armorial achievement	Shield	Bearer	Difference(s)
	William, Prince of Wales	William, Prince of Wales	The coat of arms of the Prince of Wales is the royal arms with a plain three-point label, augmented by an inescutcheon of the traditional arms of the Principality of Wales.
		Prince Harry, Duke of Sussex	Three-point label with three red escallops in each point, alluding to the patrilineal arms of his mother, Diana, Princess of Wales. The label changed from five to three points, with each point bearing an escallop, upon his father's accession to the throne in 2022, as previously stated by the College of Arms.
		Anne, Princess Royal	Three-point label, the points bearing a red cross, a red heart and a red cross.
		Anne, Princess Royal	Scottish version of the Princess Royal's arms with a three-point label, the points bearing a red cross, a red heart and a red cross.
		Andrew Mountbatten-Windsor	Three-point label, the centre point bearing a blue anchor.
		Princess Beatrice, Mrs Edoardo Mapelli Mozzi	Five-point label with three bees in alternate points, alluding to the patrilineal arms of her mother, Sarah Ferguson.
		Princess Eugenie, Mrs Jack Brooksbank	Five-point label with three thistles in alternate points, alluding to the patrilineal arms of her mother, Sarah Ferguson.
		Prince Edward, Duke of Edinburgh	Three-point label, the centre point bearing a Tudor rose.
		Prince Edward, Duke of Edinburgh	Scottish version of the Duke of Edinburgh's arms with a three-point label, the centre point bearing a Tudor rose
		Prince Richard, Duke of Gloucester	Five-point label, the first, third and fifth points bearing a red cross, the second and fourth points bearing a red lion.
		Prince Edward, Duke of Kent	Five-point label, the first, third and fifth points bearing a blue anchor, the second and fourth points bearing a red cross.
		Princess Alexandra, The Hon. Lady Ogilvy	Five-point label, the first and fifth points bearing a red heart, the second and fourth points bearing a blue anchor, and the third bearing a red cross.
		Prince Michael of Kent	Five-point label, the first, third and fifth points bearing a red cross, the second and fourth points bearing a blue anchor.
Consorts
		Queen Camilla	The arms of the King impaled with those of Camilla's father, Major Bruce Shand, crowned with the royal crown.
		Queen Camilla	Scottish version of the Queen's coat of arms with the royal crown.
		Catherine, Princess of Wales	The arms of the Prince of Wales impaled with those of Catherine's father, Michael Middleton.
		Meghan, Duchess of Sussex	The arms of the Duke of Sussex impaled with those of her own design, crowned with the coronet of a child of the sovereign.
		Sophie, Duchess of Edinburgh	The arms of the Duke of Edinburgh impaled with those granted in 1999 to Sophie's father, Christopher Rhys-Jones, with remainder to his elder brother Theo. The new grant was based on an unregistered 200-year-old design. The lion alludes to one of the Duchess's ancestors, the Welsh knight Elystan Glodrydd, Prince of Ferrig.
		Birgitte, Duchess of Gloucester	The arms of the Duke of Gloucester with an escutcheon of pretence granted to her by royal warrant on 18 July 1973.
		Princess Michael of Kent	The arms of Prince Michael of Kent impaled with those of Marie Christine's father, Baron Günther Hubertus von Reibnitz.

== See also ==
- Armorial of the United Kingdom
- Coat of arms of Canada – Canada's arms are closely modelled on the Royal Coat of Arms of the United Kingdom
- Coat of arms of Ireland – Ireland uses the medieval arms of Ireland that are incorporated into the Royal Coat of Arms of the United Kingdom
- Armorial of the House of Plantagenet
- List of British monarchs
- List of English monarchs
- List of Scottish monarchs
- Cadency labels of the British royal family
- Royal Cypher#Commonwealth realms
- Royal badges of England
- Royal Badge of Wales
- Royal Standard of the United Kingdom
- Flag of the United Kingdom
