= National symbols of Wales =

The national symbols of Wales include various official and unofficial images and other symbols.

== Flags ==
As an emblem, the red dragon (Welsh: Y Ddraig Goch) of Wales has been used since the reign of Cadwaladr, King of Gwynedd from around 655 AD, with the current design tracing to Henry VII of England, and is present on the national flag of Wales, which became an official flag in 1959.
The flag of the Princely House of Aberffraw, blazoned Quarterly or and gules, four lions passant guardant two and two counterchanged langued and armed Azure.
The banner of Owain Glyndŵr is associated with Welsh nationhood. the image of the lions were used by Welsh forces within battles during Glyndŵr's battles against the English, includes four lions on red and gold. The standard is similar to the arms of Llywelyn ap Gruffudd (Llywelyn the Last), the last Prince of Wales before the conquest of Wales by Edward I of England. The design may also be influenced by the arms of Glyndwr's parents, both of whom had lions in their arms. There's no evidence to suggest this was ever used as a flag, but they are used today on public buildings.
The Flag of Saint David, the patron Saint of Wales is sometimes used as an alternative to the national flag, is flown on St David's Day.
The Golden Dragon (Welsh: Y Ddraig Aur) Gold dragon of Wales, a flag used by Glyndŵr in his independence campaign.: 238 : 43|

== Heraldry ==
The Red Dragon (Welsh: Y Ddraig Goch) of Wales is a symbol of Wales that appears in "Cyfranc Lludd a Lleuelys", Historia Brittonum, Historia Regum Britanniae, and the Welsh triads. According to legend, Vortigern (Welsh: Gwrtheyrn) King of the Celtic Britons from Powys is interrupted whilst attempting to build fort at Dinas Emrys. He is told by Merlin/Ambrosius (Welsh: Myrddin) to dig up two dragons beneath the castle. He discovers a red dragon representing the Celtic Britons (now Welsh) and a white dragon representing Anglo-Saxons (now English). Merlin/Ambrosius prophesies that the Celtic Britons will reclaim the island and push the Anglo-Saxons back to the sea. As an emblem, the red dragon has been used since the reign of Cadwaladr, King of Gwynedd from around 655AD and is present on the national flag of Wales, which became an official flag in 1959.
Traditional Arms of the House of Aberffraw, Gwynedd and the personal arms of Llywelyn the Great.
Owain Glyndŵr's shield of arms was adopted by Glyndŵr as Prince of Wales, from 1400.
The Royal Badge of Wales, which is based on the arms of the native princes of Wales from the 13th century.

=== British (formerly English) monarchy heraldry ===
The badge represents the Duke of Cornwall or Heir Apparent of the British monarchy (commonly known as the Prince of Wales's feathers). It consists of three white feathers emerging from a gold coronet and the German motto Ich dien (I serve). Several Welsh representative teams, including the Welsh rugby union, and Welsh regiments in the British Army (the Royal Welsh, for example) use the badge or a stylised version of it. There have been attempts made to curtail the use of the emblem for commercial purposes and restrict its use to those authorised by the Prince of Wales. The use of the emblem to symbolise Wales is controversial, such as its use by the Welsh rugby union.

== Anthem ==
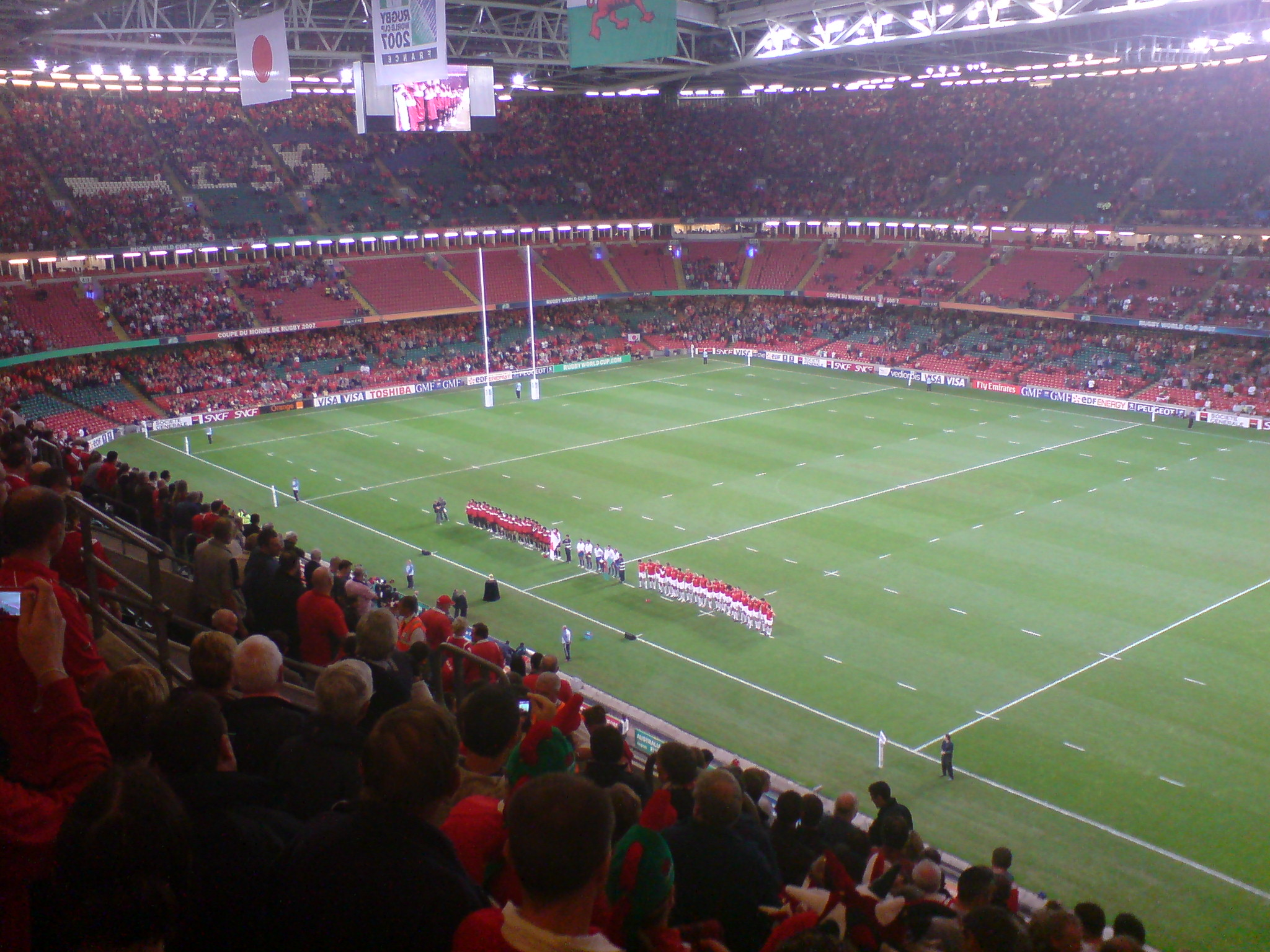
Hen Wlad fy Nhadau being sung at a Wales rugby game

Hen Wlad Fy Nhadau is the traditional national anthem of Wales. The words were written by Evan James and the tune was composed by his son, James James, both residents of Pontypridd, Glamorgan, in January 1856. The earliest written copy survives and is part of the collections of the National Library of Wales.

== Flora and fauna ==
The leek is the national emblem of Wales. According to legend, Saint David (sometimes it is King Cadwaladr) ordered Welsh soldiers to identify themselves by wearing the leek on their armour in an ancient battle.
The daffodil is the national flower of Wales, worn on St David's Day (1 March) in Wales. The daffodil may be known as Welsh: cenhinen Bedr (Saint Peter's leek).
The Sessile Oak, also called the Welsh Oak is the national tree of Wales.
The red kite is sometimes named as the national symbol of wildlife in Wales.

== Welsh Language ==
The Welsh language is considered a symbol and icon of Wales and considered a "cornerstone of Welsh identity". Spoken throughout Wales by around 750,000 people, it is present on television, radio, road signs and road markings.

=== Welsh mottos ===
- "Cymru am byth" ("Wales forever") is a popular Welsh motto.
- "Pleidiol Wyf i'm Gwlad" ("I am true to my country"), taken from the National Anthem of Wales, appears on the 2008 Royal Badge of Wales, the Welsh Seal used during the reign of Elizabeth II and on the edge of £1 coins that depict Welsh symbols.
- "Y Ddraig Goch Ddyry Cychwyn" ("the red dragon inspires action" / "the red dragon shall lead") appeared on the Royal Badge of Wales when it was created in 1953 until 2008. It also appeared on £1 coins as the motto of Cardiff.

== People ==
Saint David is the patron saint of Wales.
Llywelyn the Great was Prince of Wales between 1195 and 1240.
Owain Glyndŵr was the leader of the Welsh revolt against English rule in the Late Middle Ages.

== Cultural ==
=== Art ===
The earliest known dated lovespoon from Wales, displayed in the St Fagans National History Museum near Cardiff, is from 1667, although the tradition is believed to date back long before that.

=== Costume ===
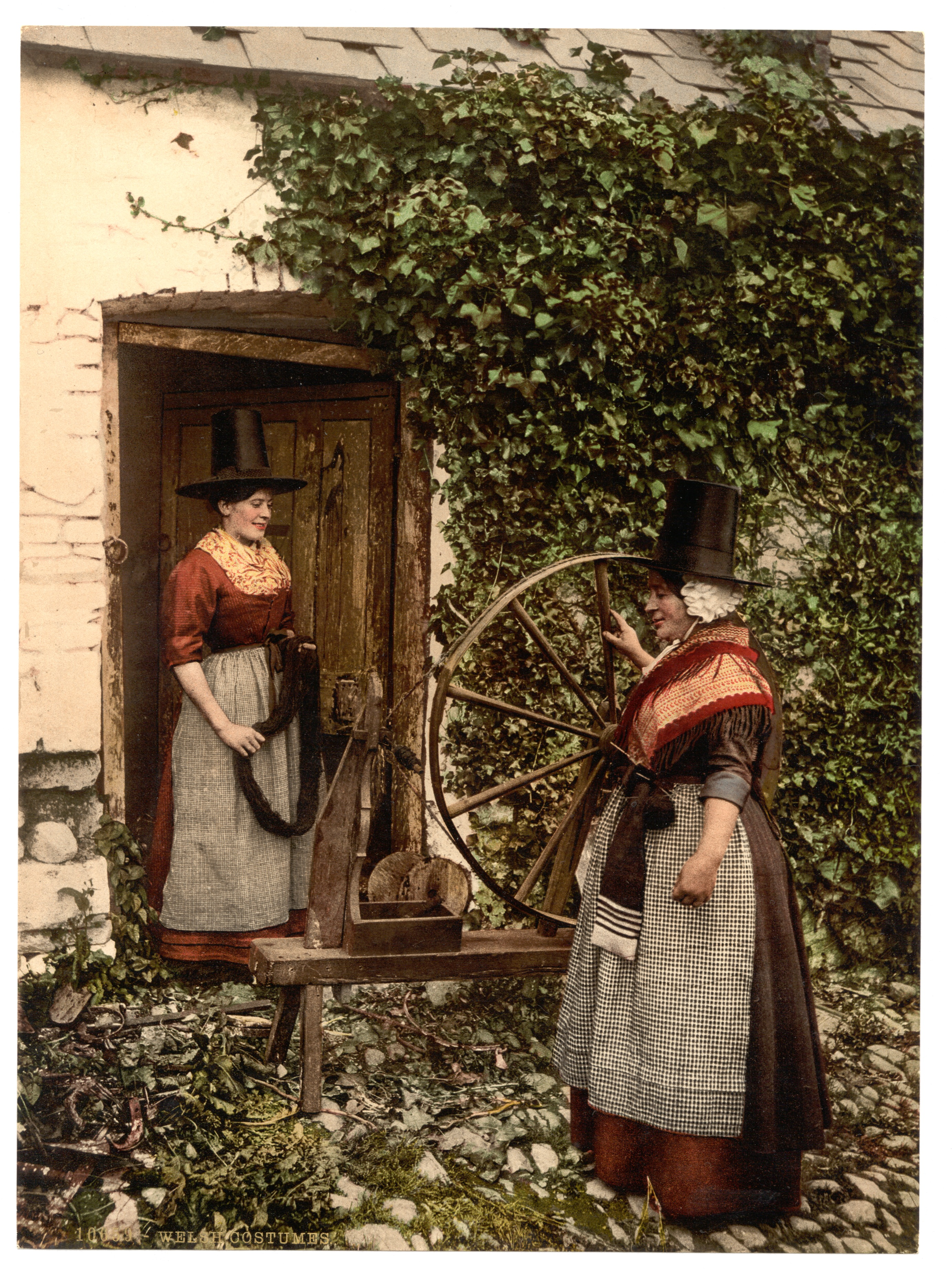
Welsh dress, 1905

The unique Welsh hat, which first made its appearance in the 1830s, was used as an icon of Wales from the 1840s.

From the 1880s, when the traditional costume had gone out of general use, selected elements of it became adopted as a national costume. From then on it was worn by women at events such as Royal visits, by choirs, at church and chapel, for photographs and occasionally at eisteddfodau. It was first worn by girls as a celebration on Saint David's Day just before the First World War. The costume is now recognised as the national dress of Wales.

=== Food and drink ===
Welsh cakes are described in the Life in the UK test as the national dish of Wales.
Cawl is a traditional Welsh soup made with lamb or beef and leeks, potatoes, swedes, carrots and other seasonal vegetables
Glamorgan sausages are traditional Welsh vegetarian sausages made from cheese, leeks and breadcrumbs.
Welsh rarebit is a dish of hot cheese sauce served on toasted bread.

=== Music ===
Male voice choirs are considered a Welsh symbol. Traditional members of the movement include the Treorchy choir and the Morriston choir. More recently, the success Only Men Aloud has also played a part in continuing this tradition.

The Welsh harp, also known as the triple harp, is considered to be the national instrument of Wales.

== See also ==
- List of national symbols of the United Kingdom, the Channel Islands and the Isle of Man
