= Pennal Letter =

Letter from Owain Glyndŵr to France

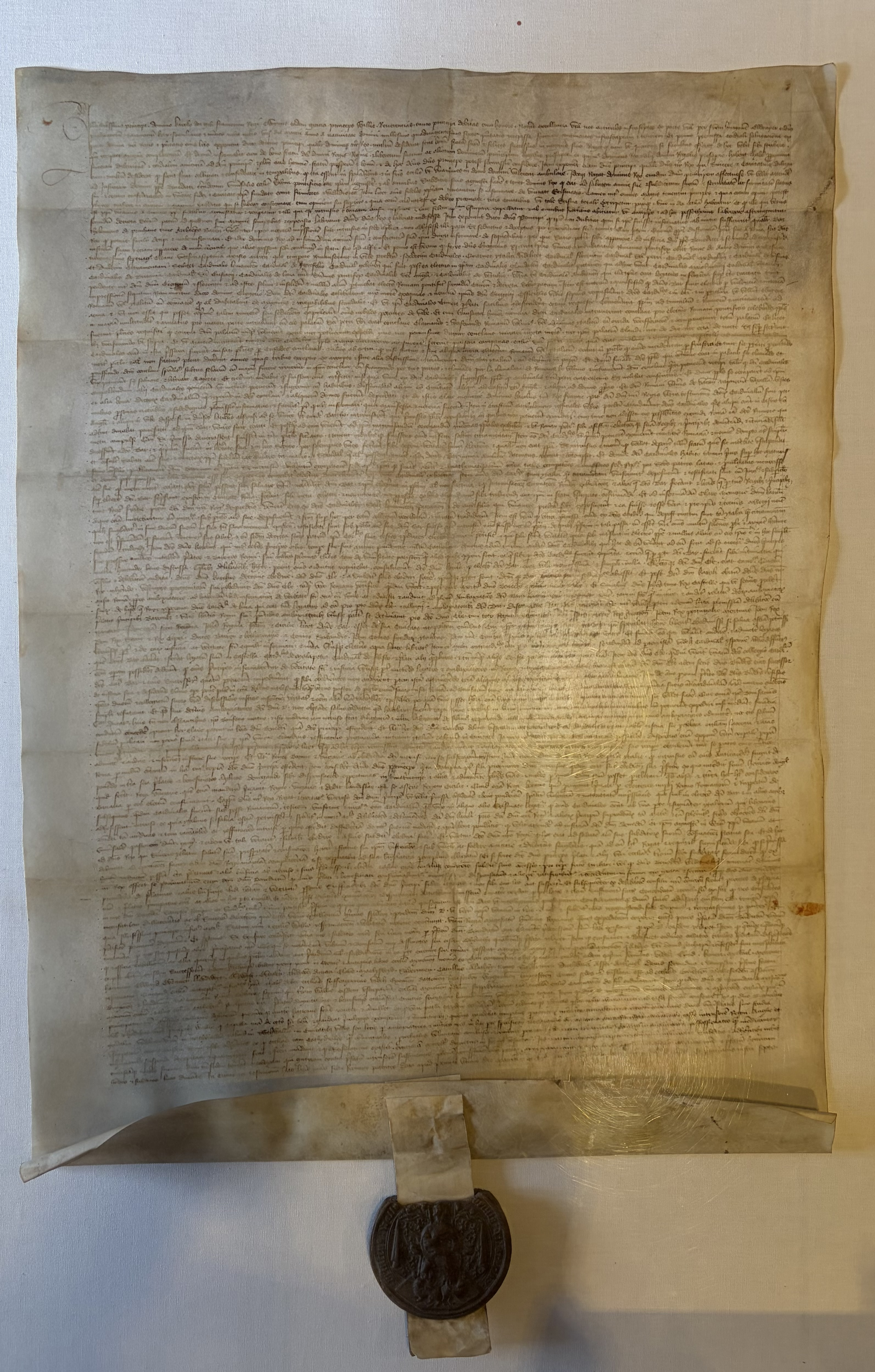
- A facsimile of the Pennal Letter held at the Parliament House in Machynlleth
- Created: 1406
- Signatories: Owain Glyndŵr

The Pennal Letter was a historical letter by Owain Glyndŵr to Charles VI, King of France. Owain composed the letter in Latin, in Pennal, in the north of Wales, in 1406, and set out his vision of an independent Wales.

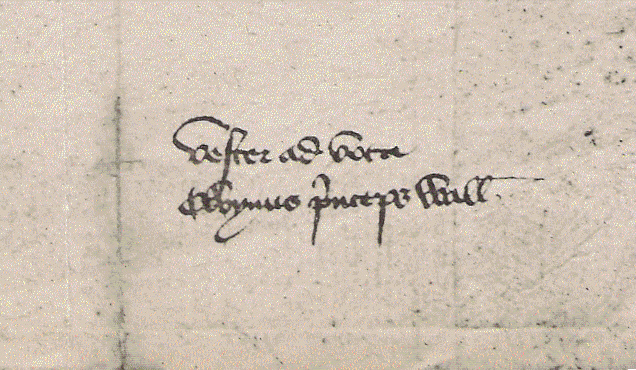
Signature of Owain Glyndŵr in the letter

The letter is regarded as unique as the only surviving written documentation detailing secular and religious policies for a potential independent Wales in the Middle Ages.

In the letter, Owain pledges obedience to Antipope Benedict XIII of Avignon, supported by Charles VI during the Avignon Papacy, as opposed to the Province of Canterbury and Pope Innocent VII, the pope in Rome, who was supported by English King Henry IV. He describes the English government as "the barbarous Saxons, who usurped to themselves the land of Wales" and calls for Pope Benedict XIII to try and punish Henry IV as a heretic for the burning of many church buildings and the execution of members of the Welsh church.

== History ==
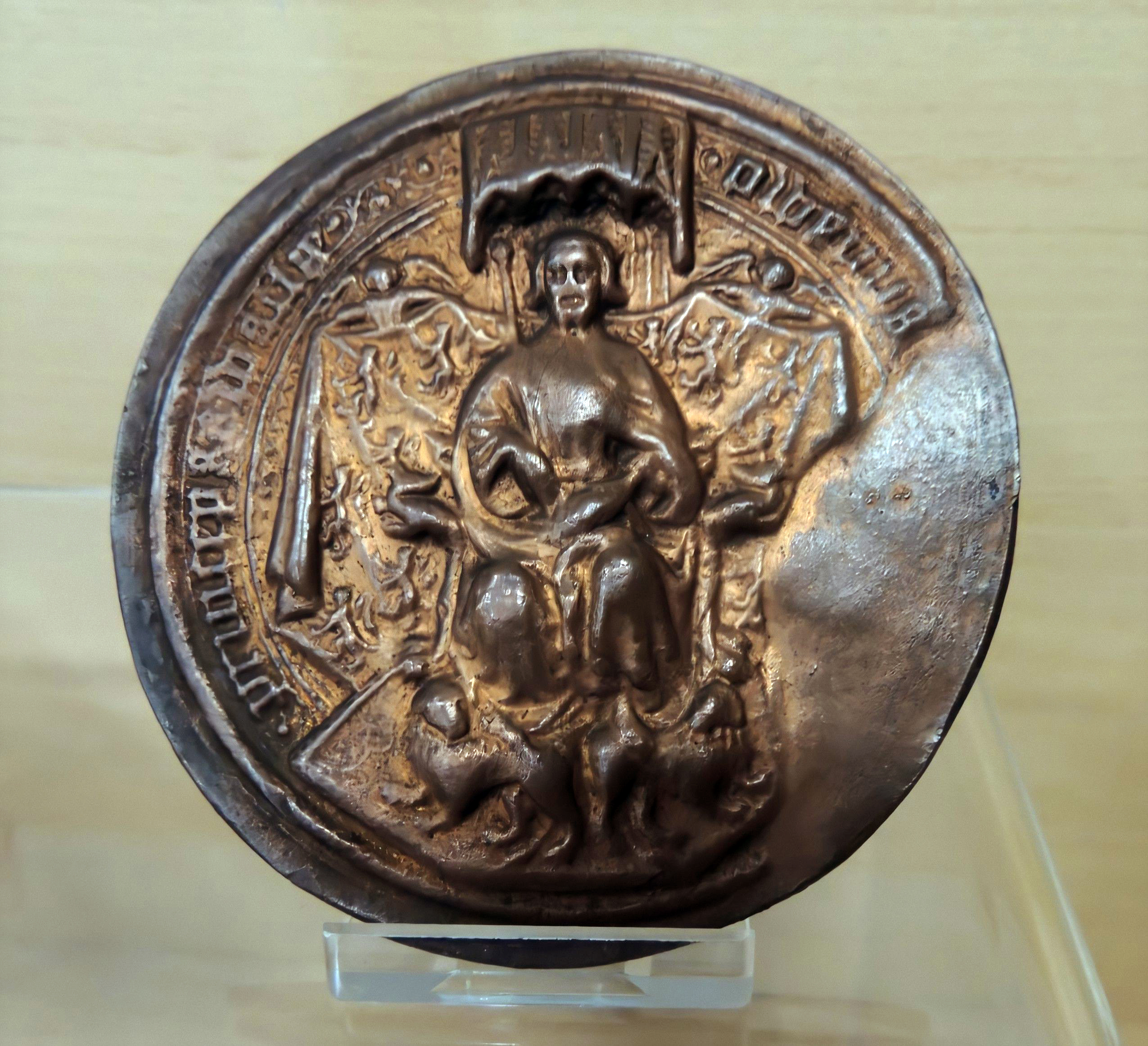
Owain Glyndŵr seal impression

The letter was sent by Owain Glyndŵr in 1406 to the king of France, Charles V asking for assistance in fighting against English rule in Wales. Glyndŵr outlines his hopes to establish an independent Welsh church and the ability of clergy to speak Welsh. He also sets out his plans for founding two universities in Wales.

== Location ==
The letter is held in the National Archives of France (J516 B.40 and J516.29). It was briefly exhibited at the National Library of Wales in 2000, and there is a campaign for its permanent return and display at the Senedd in Cardiff. Six exact facsimile copies, on aged parchment sealed with moulds of the original seal of Glyndŵr, were made by the National Library of Wales and presented to six Welsh institutions in 2009.

Mark Drakeford, First Minister of Wales was shown the letter on his visit to Paris to strengthen the Welsh relationship with France.

It was also briefly exhibited at the press night of Welsh National Theatres Owain & Henry at Wales Millennium Centre.

== Proposed repatriation to Wales ==
Pennal Letter is held in Paris, France after being sent by Owain Glyndŵr to the king of France in 1406. It has been backed by periodic calls for its return to Wales.

In 1999, an early day motion to the House of Commons, signed by 28 members, called for the letter and the seal to be repatriated from the French National Library in France, reasoning that it was of "great historical significance in Wales as rare treasures of Welsh history" and should be exhibited in Wales. The motion was supported by the politicians Paul Flynn, Alun Michael and Ron Davies.

In 2022, the Welsh singer Gwilym Bowen Rhys made similar calls.
