= Vandana =

Vandana may refer to:

- Vandana Gupte, Indian actress of Marathi cinema
- Vandana Jain, Indian ophthalmologist
- Vandana Mohit (born 1991), Trinidad and Tobago politician
- Vandana Shanbagh (born 1963), Indian athlete
- Vandana Shiva (born 1952), Indian environmental activist
- Vandana Singh, Indian science fiction writer
- Vandana (moth), a genus of moths of the family Erebidae
- Vandana (film), 1975 Indian film

== See also ==
- Bandana (disambiguation)
- Vandanam, a 1989 Indian film
