= Welsh Seal =

Seal used in Wales

The Welsh Seal (Welsh: Y Sêl Gymreig) is a seal used by the First Minister of Wales to seal letters patent signed by the monarch giving royal assent to bills passed by the Senedd (Welsh Parliament; Welsh: Senedd Cymru). The sealed bill is thereby enacted, becoming an Act of Senedd Cymru.

From the start of Welsh devolution in 1999, a Measure of the National Assembly for Wales was authorised by the crown using the Great Seal of the Realm kept at Westminster. This seal was conceived in England under the reign of Edward the Confessor, allowing an appointed officer to authorise official documents with an impression in wax rather than requiring the signature of the monarch. Under Part 4 of the Government of Wales Act 2006, which was brought into force after a 2011 referendum, the Welsh Assembly (since 2020 the Senedd) was given greater power, to make Acts instead of Measures, using a separate Welsh Seal instead of the Great Seal of the Realm. This was the first Welsh seal to be used since the time of Owain Glyndŵr. The 2006 act also designated the First Minister as "Keeper of the Welsh Seal" (Ceidwad y Sêl Gymreig).

== Design ==
=== Elizabeth II ===
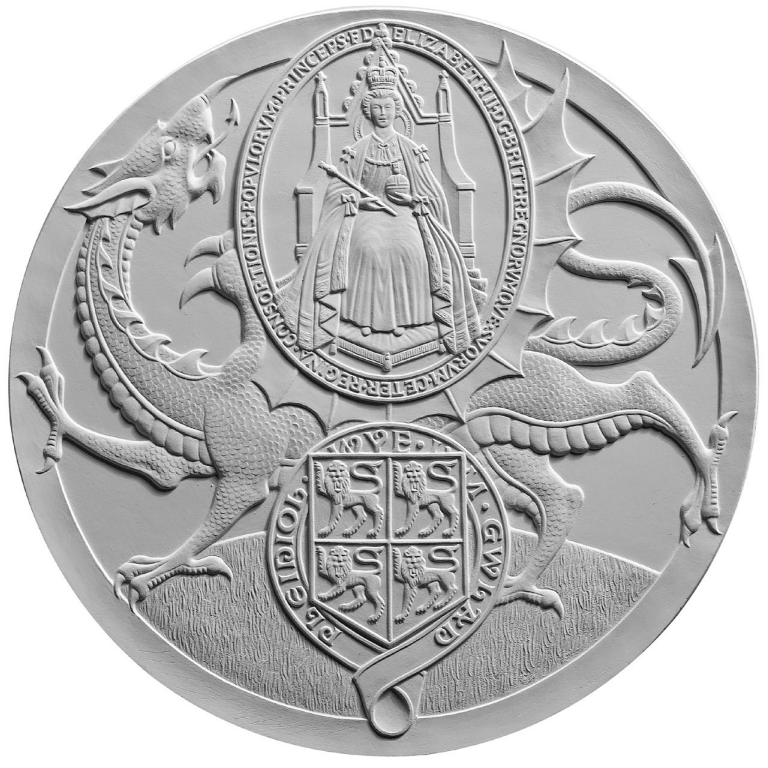
The Welsh Seal during the reign of Elizabeth II. The seal includes a dragon and the arms of Llywelyn ap Gruffudd the last native Prince of Wales.

The basic form of the seal used during the reign of Elizabeth II was approved by the First Minister of Wales in January 2011. The seal is one-sided and represents both the monarch and the Welsh nation; it also features the Royal Badge of Wales. The final design of the seal was decided on 23 June 2011 by the Royal Mint Advisory Committee on the Design of Coins, Medals, Seals and Decorations, with the advice of the College of Arms. The design was made public in December 2011, following a visit by First Minister Carwyn Jones to the Royal Mint in Llantrisant, where the seal was about to be made. Queen Elizabeth II formally delivered the seal into the custody of the First Minister at a meeting of the Privy Council at Buckingham Palace, London, on 14 December 2011.

The design featured the following elements:

- A representation of the monarch, Elizabeth II on a throne,
- The inscription "elizabeth · ii · d·g· britt · regnorvmqve · svorvmqve ceter · regina · consortionis · popvlorvm · princeps · f·d" (Elizabeth II, by the grace of God of the Britains and of her other realms Queen, Head of the Commonwealth, Defender of the Faith).
- The Royal Badge of Wales,
- The Welsh Dragon

=== Charles III ===
Following the death of Elizabeth II and the ascension of Charles III on 8 September 2022, a new Welsh seal is expected to be struck. On 10 September 2022 it was ordered that "the First Minister of Wales is authorised to make use of the existing Welsh Seal until another Seal be prepared and authorised by His Majesty".

== Former seals ==
Seals were also used by the Welsh princes, prior to the conquest of Wales in 1283. During the Welsh Revolt of 1400–c. 1415, Owain Glyndŵr also struck a great seal for Wales and used it to seal official documents such as the Pennal Letter to the King of France.

=== Llywelyn the Great ===
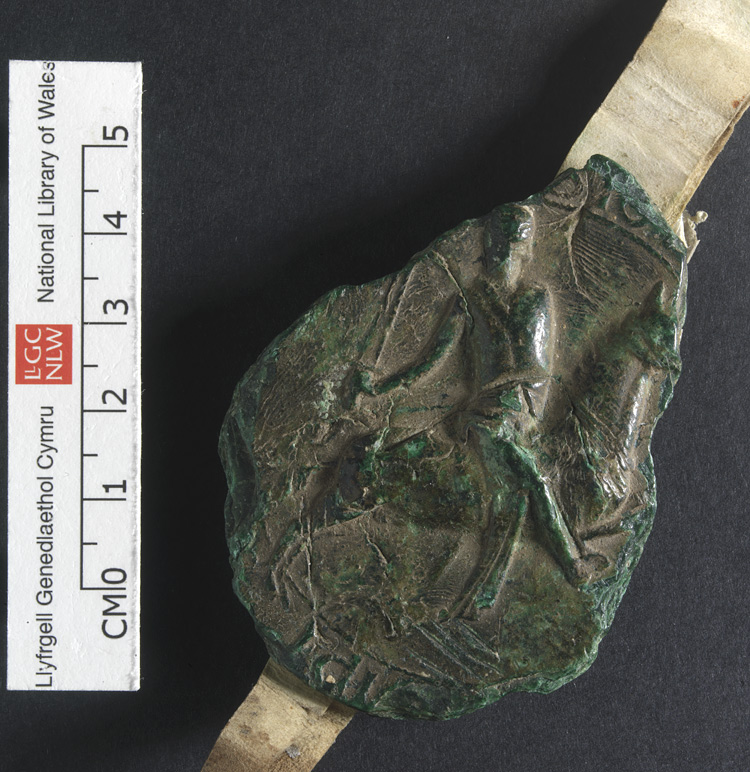
Seal of Llywelyn ap Iorwerth (d. 1240).

The seal of Llywelyn the Great (Llywelyn ap Iorwerth) is dated to 1240. Llywelyn is pictured armoured in surcoat holding a sword in his right hand and a shield on his left arm mounted on horse galloping to the right.

Seals were used as a sign of authenticity of the signatory and a privy seal was sometimes added to the back of the wax seal to ensure further authenticity. Llywelyn ap Iorwerth is known to have used his privy or counter-seal such as in 1230, "sealing the letters with his secret seal because he has not his great seal with him".

=== Llywelyn the Last ===
The privy seal of Llywelyn the Last (Llywelyn ap Gruffydd), his wife Eleanor and his brother Dafydd are thought to have been melted down by the English after finding them upon their bodies to make a chalice in 1284.

Archbishop Peckham, in his first letter to Robert Bishop of Bath and Wells dated 17 December 1282 stated "If the king wishes to have the copy [of the list] found in the breeches of Llywelyn, he can have it from Edmund Mortimer, who has custody of it and also of Llywelyn's privy seal and certain other things found in the same place."

=== Owain Glyndŵr ===
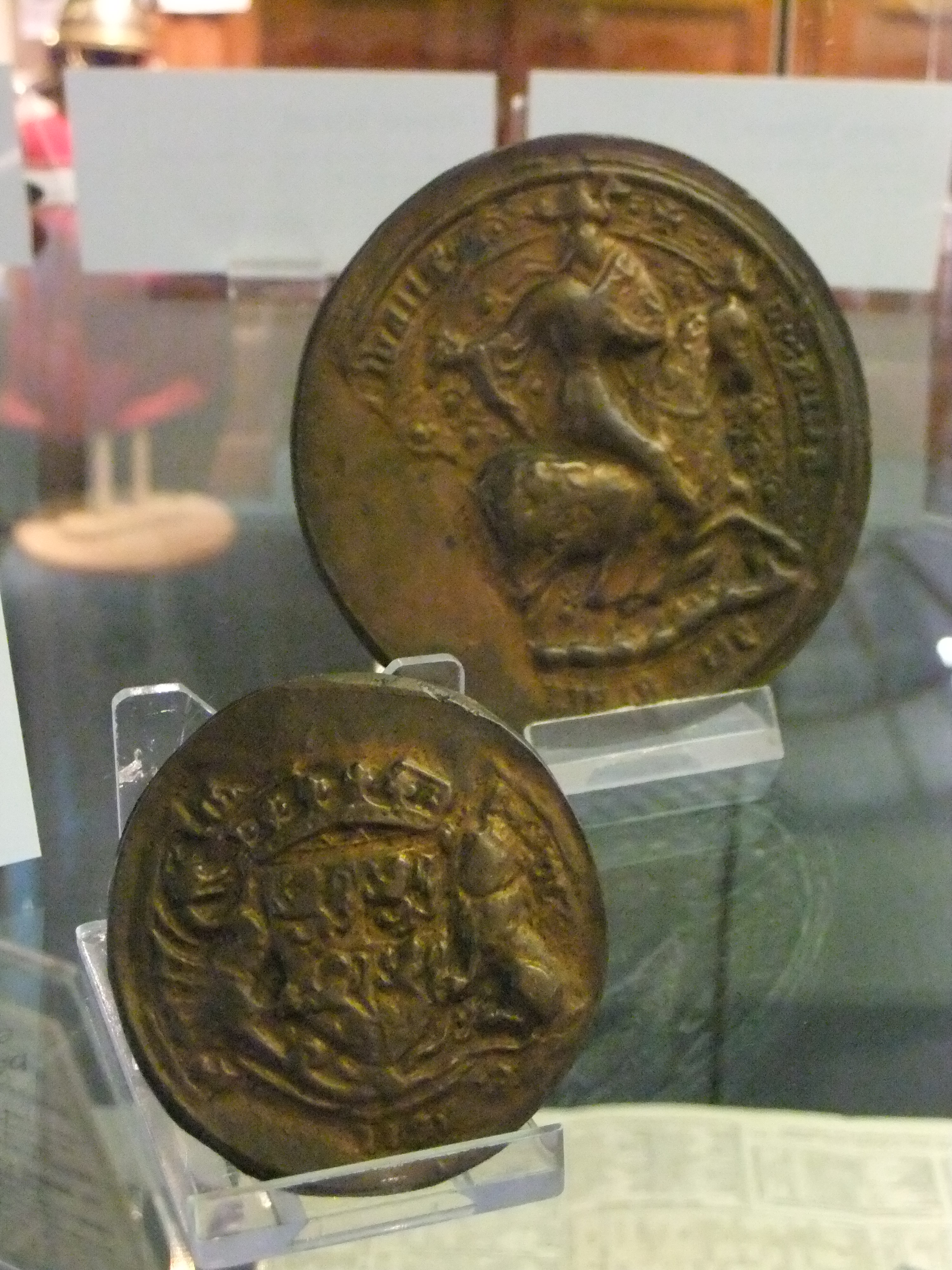
Seal (right) and Privy Seal (left) of Owain Glyndŵr as Prince of Wales. The privy seal includes his arms, a crown, flowers with five petals and, as supporters, a lion (possibly crowned) sejeant erect guardant to the dexter and a wyvern-type dragon (ddraig) sejeant erect to the sinister.

Owain Glyndŵr's Great Seal as Prince of Wales included a wyvern-type dragon gules (red) and/or or (gold) on his crest; and the legend Latin: Owynus Dei Gratia Princeps Walliae – "Owain, by the grace of God, Prince of Wales".

The Pennal Letter, written by Glyndŵr in 1406 and bearing his great seal, is currently held in the Archives Nationales in Paris. In 2009, facsimile copies of the seal were created by the National Library of Wales and presented by the then heritage minister, Alun Ffred Jones, to six Welsh institutions.

In 1999 an early day motion was put forward for the return of Glyndŵr seals to Wales, but failed to reach sufficient support to be debated in parliament.

== List of Keepers of the Welsh Seal ==
The Government of Wales Act 2006 designated the First Minister of Wales as Keeper of the Welsh Seal (Ceidwad y Sêl Gymreig).

- 2011–2018: Carwyn Jones
- 2018–2024: Mark Drakeford
- 2024: Vaughan Gething
- 2024–2026: Eluned Morgan
- 2026–present: Rhun ap Iorwerth

== See also ==
=== Wales ===
- Royal Badge of Wales
- Welsh heraldry
- List of rulers of Wales
- Welsh Dragon

=== Other ===
- Great Seal of the Realm
- Great Seal of Scotland
- Great Seal of Northern Ireland
