= Royal Badge of Wales =

- The badge since 2024, with a Tudor Crown
- Armiger: Charles III
- Adopted: 2008
- Motto: Pleidiol Wyf i'm Gwlad, Welsh for 'I am true to my country'
- Badge: Within a circular riband vert fimbriated Or bearing the motto Pleidiol Wyf i'm Gwlad in letters the same and ensigned with a representation of the Crown proper, an escutcheon quarterly Or and gules four lions passant guardant counterchanged armed and langued azure, encircled by a wreath alternating of leek, thistle, clover, leek and rose.

The Royal Badge of Wales is a heraldic emblem used to represent Wales as a country. It was approved by Elizabeth II for official use in May 2008. It is based on the arms borne by the 13th-century Welsh prince Llywelyn ab Iorwerth (blazoned quarterly Or and gules, four lions passant guardant counterchanged), with the addition of a crown atop a continuous scroll which, together with a wreath consisting of the plant emblems of the four countries of the United Kingdom, surrounds the shield. The motto which appears on the scroll, PLEIDIOL WYF I'M GWLAD ('I am true to my country'), is taken from the national anthem of Wales; it was also an element of the Welsh designs for £1 coins minted from 1985 until 2000. The badge formerly appeared on the covers of Measures of the National Assembly for Wales; since the 2011 Welsh devolution referendum it now appears on the cover of Acts passed by the Senedd (as the Assembly became in 2020), and its escutcheon, ribbon and motto are depicted on the Welsh Seal.

The current badge follows in a long line of heraldic devices representing Wales. Its predecessors have all been variations on either the Red Dragon, an ancient emblem revived by Henry VII, or the arms of Llywelyn. Whereas the three historical kingdoms of England, Scotland and Ireland are represented in the royal arms of the United Kingdom, Wales has no such representation as it was annexed and incorporated into the Kingdom of England. The badge has been referenced as a coat of arms for Wales with its use by the Welsh Parliament in acts and laws.

Following the death of Queen Elizabeth II, the design of King Charles III's royal cypher was announced on 27 September 2022, which featured the Tudor Crown rather than St Edward's Crown. The College of Arms had envisioned that the Tudor Crown would be used in future in representations of the royal arms and on crown badges, an update that was announced on 10 October 2024.

== History ==
=== Arms of the Prince of Wales: Llywelyn ab Iorwerth ===
Before the Norman Conquest, Wales was ruled by a number of kings and princes, whose dominions shifted and sometimes merged following the vagaries of war, marriage and inheritance. All these kings and princes were ascribed personal coats of arms, often retrospectively if they lived before the dawn of heraldry as it is currently known, and these were borne by their descendants in Wales. The two principal Welsh kingdoms were those of Gwynedd, in the north, and Deheubarth in the south. Of these, the more successful, and the last, finally, to fall, was that of Gwynedd, and the arms now borne by the Princes of Wales as an inescutcheon since 1910 are the historic arms of the dynasty of Gwynedd as borne by the last native Princes of Wales, including Llywelyn ab Iorwerth (Llywelyn the Great) and his grandson Llywelyn ap Gruffudd (Llywelyn the Last). These arms have the blazon Quarterly Or and Gules, four lions passant guardant counterchanged, armed and langued Azure.

A daughter of Llywelyn ab Iorwerth was Elen the Younger ferch Llywelyn, Countess of Fife and (by her second marriage) Countess of Mar. Her daughter Isabella of Mar married Robert, the Bruce, King of Scots and had one child by him, Marjorie Bruce, who was the mother of the first Stewart monarch, Robert II of Scotland. His direct descendant, James VI of Scotland became also King of England as James I, and is the direct ancestor of every subsequent English monarch, including King Charles III, who is thereby (and through other lines also) the direct lineal descendant of Llywelyn ab Iorwerth.

The traditional arms of Llywelyn: Quarterly Or and Gules, four lions passant guardant counterchanged, armed and langued Azure.

=== Modern use of the arms ===
When in 1911 the future King Edward VIII was made Prince of Wales, a warrant exemplifying his arms was issued. Along with the usual royal arms differenced by a "label" of three points, his main coat of arms included an "inescutcheon surtout" crowned with the heir apparent's coronet and containing the arms of Llywelyn of Gwynedd to represent the principality of Wales.

It is unclear whether, before this date, they were thought of as the "arms of Wales" or simply as the "arms of Llywelyn". But they had certainly not previously been used by heirs to the English or British thrones; indeed, in his 1909 book A Complete Guide to Heraldry, Arthur Charles Fox-Davies had written: "It is much to be regretted that the arms of HRH The Prince of Wales do not include...any allusion to his dignities of Prince of Wales or Earl of Chester." The only allusion, before this innovation, to Wales in the royal arms had been the inclusion, among many other badges, of on a mount vert a dragon rouge – the royal badge on which the present flag of Wales is based.

In the 1960s, a banner of the principality's arms, defaced with an inescutcheon of his heraldic coronet, was introduced for the Prince of Wales's use in Wales.

In 2007 the Presiding Officer of the National Assembly for Wales entered into discussions with the Prince of Wales and the College of Arms regarding a grant of arms for official use by the Assembly. A new royal badge designed by the Garter King of Arms, Peter Gwynne-Jones, was granted in 2008 based on the arms of Llywelyn.

The Arms of the Prince of Wales. Used by Prince Edward, then by Prince Charles and now Prince William.

The personal flag of the Prince of Wales for use in Wales created in the 1960s

The royal badge in use from 2008 to 2024, with St Edward's Crown

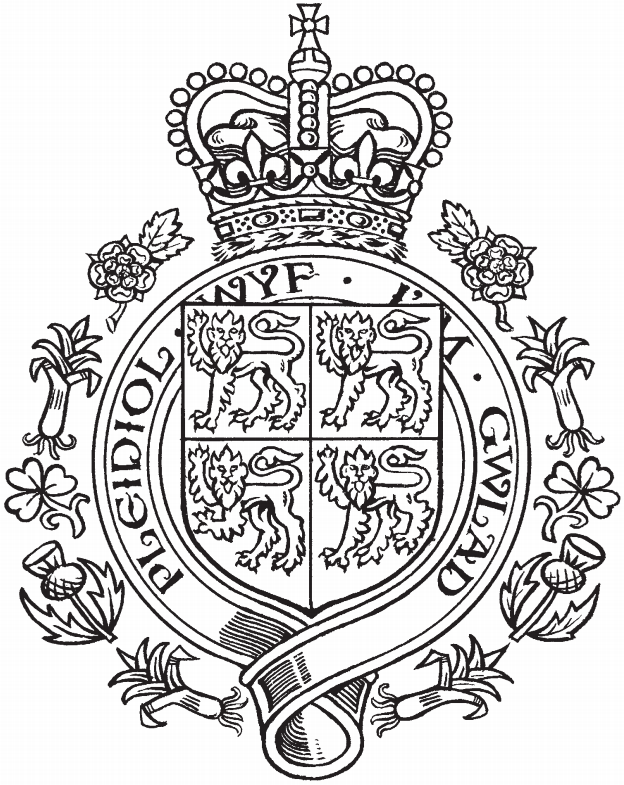

The royal badge in use from 2008 (King's Printer version)

== Badges with the Welsh dragon ==
The Red Dragon of Wales

Versions
- Augmented badge of 1953
- Adopted: 1801; augmented in 1953
- Badge: Within a circular riband Argent fimbriated Or bearing the motto Y ddraig goch ddyry cychwyn ('the red dragon inspires action'), in letters Vert, and ensigned with a representation of the Crown proper, an escutcheon per fesse Argent and Vert and thereon the Red Dragon passant

Henry VII had the red dragon of Wales depicted on his royal standard, overlaid on a green and white field (the livery of the Tudor family) when he marched through Wales on his way to Bosworth Field. His standard bearer, Sir William Brandon, was killed by Richard III on the battlefield. After the battle, the standard was carried in state to St Paul's Cathedral to be blessed.

During his reign Henry VII also appointed William Tyndale or Tendale a royal pursuivant called the Rouge Dragon Pursuivant. The badge of this office was a red dragon on a green mount.

The red dragon did not become an official royal heraldic badge until 1800, when George III issued a royal warrant confirming the badge, blazoned as: On a mount Vert a dragon passant with wings elevated Gules.

There is a further badge for Wales, belonging to the Princes of Wales since 1901, of the red dragon on a mount but with a label of three points Argent about the shoulder to difference it from the monarch's badge. (A similar label of three points is used in his arms, crest and supporters for the same reason.)

=== Augmentation of honour ===
In 1953 the badge was given an augmentation of honour. The augmented badge is blazoned: Within a circular riband Argent fimbriated Or bearing the motto Y ddraig goch ddyry cychwyn ('the red dragon inspires action'), in letters Vert, and ensigned with a representation of the Crown proper, an escutcheon per fesse Argent and Vert and thereon the Red Dragon passant. Winston Churchill, the prime minister at the time, detested the badge's design, as is revealed in the following Cabinet minute from 1953:

P.M. [Churchill]

Odious design expressing nothg. but spite, malice, ill-will and monstrosity.
Words (Red Dragon takes the lead) are untrue and unduly flattering to Bevan.

Ll.G. [Gwilym Lloyd George – Minister for Food, later Home Secretary]

Wd. rather be on R[oyal] Arms. This (dating from Henry VII) will be somethg.
We get no recognition in Union – badge or flags.

In 1956 this badge was added to the arms of the Welsh capital city Cardiff by placing it on collars around the necks of the two supporters of the shield. The badge was the basis of a flag of Wales in which it was placed on a background divided horizontally with the top half white and bottom half green. In 1959 Government use of this flag was dropped in favour of the current flag at the urging of the Gorsedd of Bards.

The badge was used by the Welsh Office and its successor the Wales Office until January 2017. It was used in the interim logo of the National Assembly for Wales until the "dynamic dragon" logo was adopted.

The 1901 red dragon badge of the Prince of Wales with the white label of three points

The coat of arms of Cardiff, with the badge suspended from the necks of the supporters

The Flag of Wales used from 1953 to 1959, with the augmented badge

== Other symbols ==

The Prince of Wales's feathers badge, first used by Edward the Black Prince the heir of King Edward III of England

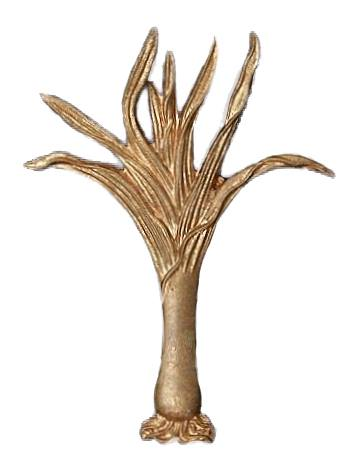

The leek is a traditional symbol of Wales and is used by the Welsh Guards regiment of the British Army as its cap badge.

The daffodil is the national flower of Wales and is sometimes used in heraldry, such as this coat of arms of Earl Lloyd-George of Dwyfor.

== See also ==
- Armorial of local councils in Wales
- Welsh heraldry
- Welsh Seal
- National symbols of Wales
- Honours of the Principality of Wales
- Flag of Saint David
