= Y Bandana (album) =

Studio album by Y Bandana
- Released: 31 January 2011
- Genre: Alternative rock
- Length: 41:34
- Label: Copa (label of Sain)

Singles from Y Bandana
- 1. "Dal dy Drwyn/Cân y Tân" Released: 2 August 2010

Y Bandana is the self-titled debut studio album of the Welsh language alternative rock band Y Bandana, released in the United Kingdom on 31 January 2011.

== Track listing ==
All tracks are written by Tomos Owens, Siôn Owens, Gwilym Rhys and Robin Jones.

CD and digital download
No.	Title	Length
1.	"Dyna Be Di'r Son"	4:10
2.	"Yr Unig Beth Dwi Isio"	3:18
3.	"Siwgwr Candi Mel"	3:34
4.	"Clywch Clywch Buwch"	3:16
5.	"Dwi'm Yn Fabi Dim Mwy"	3:30
6.	"Cân y Tân"	4:18
7.	"P.R.@"	2:10
8.	"Anturiaethau Sali Mali"	3:11
9.	"Dal dy Drwyn"	4:21
10.	"Wyt ti'n nabod Mr Pei?"	3:54
11.	"Rheda Am Dy Fywyd"	3:07
12.	"Be Nawni?"	2:54
Total length:		41:34

== Dal dy Drwyn/Cân y Tân ==
"Dal dy Drwyn/Cân y Tân"

Single by Y Bandana

from the album Y Bandana
- Released: 2 August 2010
- Recorded: 2010
- Genre: Alternative rock
- Length: 4:21 (Dal dy Drwyn); 4:18 (Cân y Tân)
- Label: Copa (label of Sain)
- Songwriters: Tomos Owens; Siôn Owens; Gwilym Rhys; Robin Jones
- Producer: Y Bandana

"Dal dy Drwyn" and "Cân y Tân" were released on 2 August 2010 as a double A-side single before being included on the album Y Bandana. The songs have received generally favourable reviews from critics. The song "Dal dy Drwyn" has been noted for its humorous lyrics and catchy melody as it "bemoans the smell of another with Arctic Monkeys precision", and the nature of the song is evident in its title, which translates into English as "hold your nose". The band achieved an award for the best single in Welsh language magazine Y Selar in 2010, while the song "Cân y Tân" won the award for best song in the same year.

=== Track listing ===
Digital download
No.	Title	Length
1.	"Dal dy Drwyn"	4:21
2.	"Cân y Tân"	4:18
