= Bandanna, Pennsylvania =

Unincorporated area in Pennsylvania, US

Coordinates: 39°44′19″N 76°56′14″W

Bandanna, also known as Pleasant Hill, is an unincorporated area in York County, Pennsylvania, United States, administered by Borough Council and Mayor, Clay Settle. Bandanna is located on Pennsylvania Route 94, approximately three miles south of Hanover.
