= Welsh Dragon =

Heraldic symbol of Wales

The Welsh Dragon (Y Ddraig Goch)

The Welsh Dragon (Welsh: y Ddraig Goch, meaning 'the red dragon', pronounced [ə ˈðraiɡ ˈɡoːχ]) is a heraldic symbol that represents Wales and appears on the national flag of Wales.

Ancient leaders of the Celtic Britons that are personified as dragons include Maelgwn Gwynedd, Mynyddog Mwynfawr and Urien Rheged. Later Welsh "dragons" include Owain Gwynedd, Llywelyn ap Gruffydd and Owain Glyndŵr.

The red dragon appears in the ancient Mabinogion story of Lludd and Llefelys where it is confined, battling with an invading white dragon, at Dinas Emrys. The story continues in the Historia Brittonum, written around AD 829, where Gwrtheyrn, King of the Britons is frustrated in attempts to build a fort at Dinas Emrys. He is told by a boy, Emrys, to dig up two dragons fighting beneath the castle. He discovers the white dragon representing the Anglo-Saxons, which is soon to be defeated by the red dragon of Wales.

The red dragon is now seen as symbolising Wales, present on the current national flag of Wales, which became an official flag in 1959.

== History ==
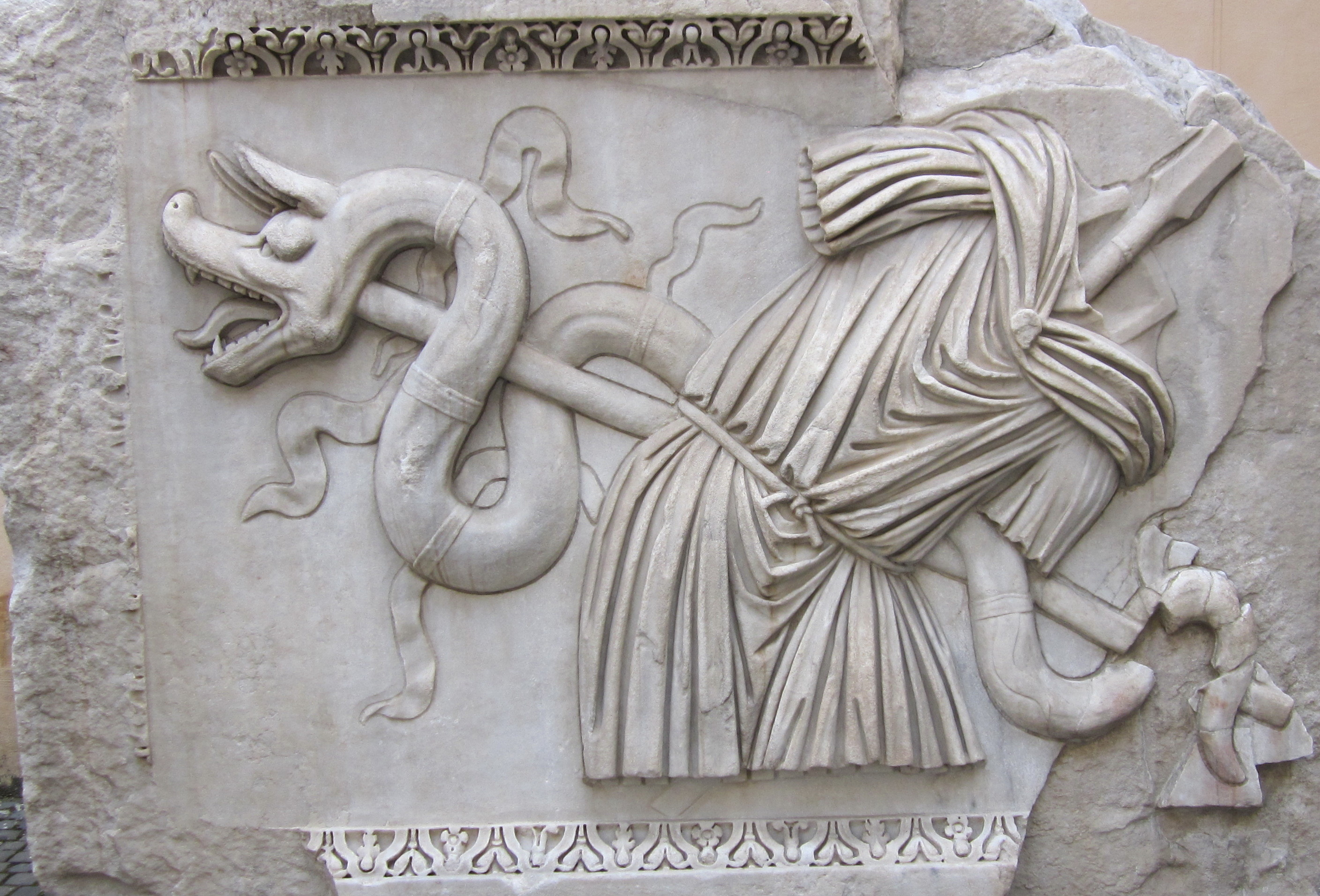
Dacian draco captured by Romans, Rome

The military use of the term "dragon" (in Latin, "draco") dates back to the Roman period and this in turn is likely inspired by the symbols of the Scythians, Indians, Persians, Dacians or Parthians. The term draco can refer to a dragon, serpent or snake and the term draconarius (also Latin) denotes "the bearer of the serpent standard". Franz Altheim suggests that the first appearance of the draco used by Romans coincides with Roman recruitment of nomad troops from south and central Asia during the time of Marcus Aurelius. One notable Draco symbol which may have influenced the Welsh dragon is that of the Sarmatians, who contributed to the cavalry units stationed in Ribchester from the 2nd to 4th centuries. Cohorts were represented by the draco military standard from the third century in the same way that the eagle Aquila standard represented the legions. The standard bearer of the cohort was called draconarius and carried a gilded staff with a dragon at the top. For instance, Gauls are attested to have marched under the dragon to distinguish the Gallic cohort from the Roman legions.

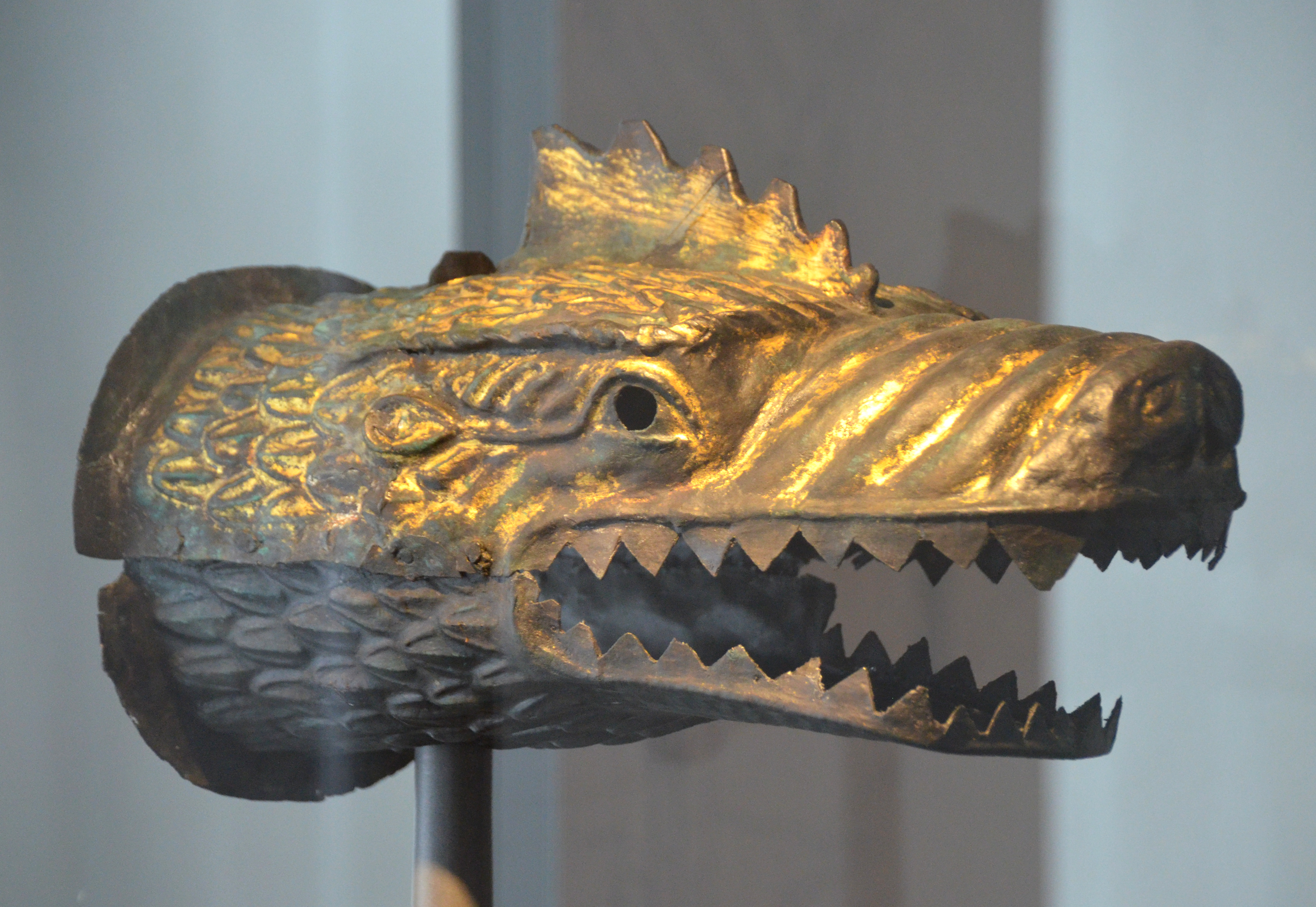
The Draco standard of Niederbieber

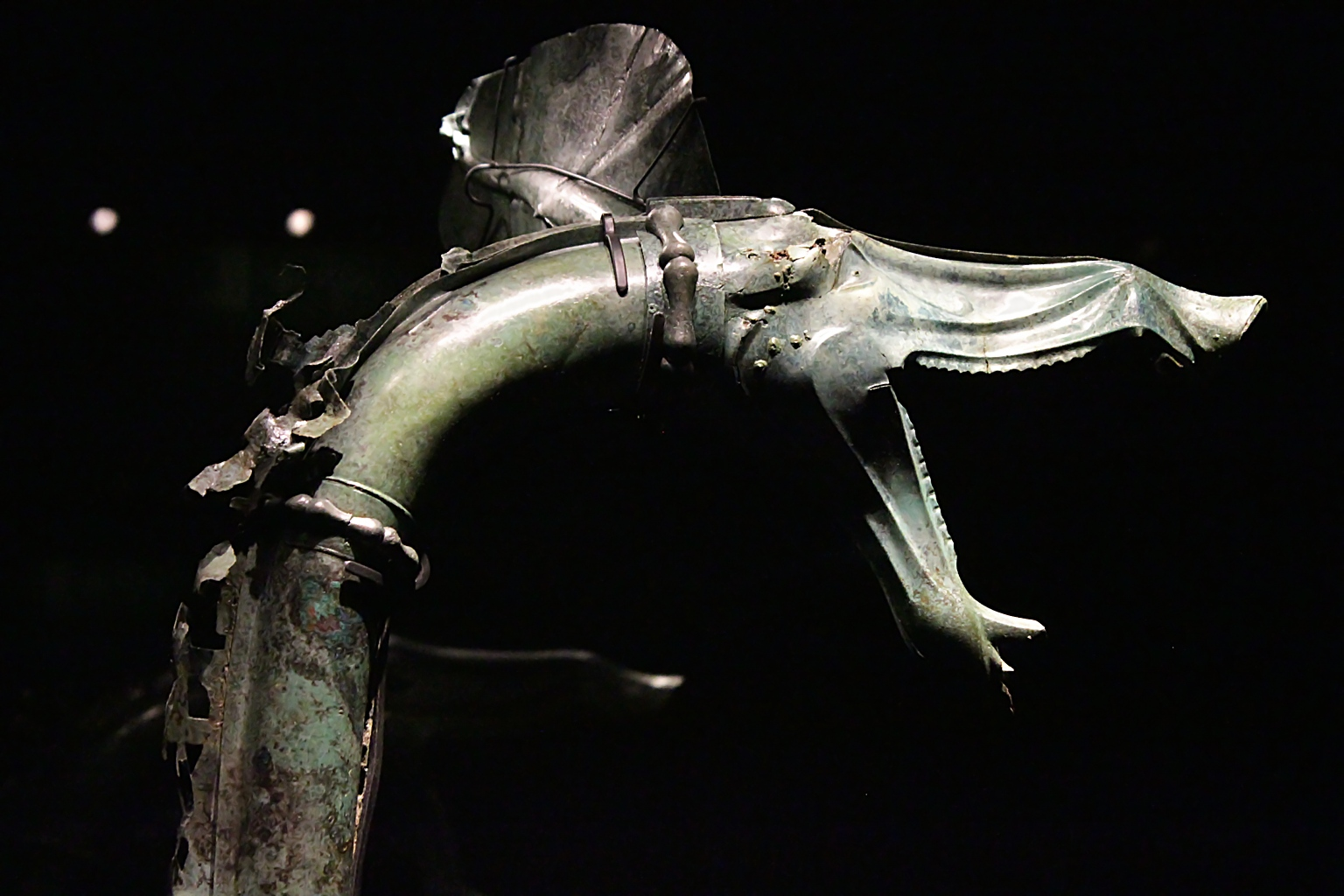
Carnyx of Tintignac

After the Roman withdrawal it has long been suggested that resistance to the Saxon incursion was led either by Romans or Romanised Britons, and this is evident in the names attributed in legend to those who led the opposition, including Ambrosius Aurelianus and perhaps Artorius. This could account for how the Roman terminology came to be adopted by Britons. From the first extant written records of the Britons, it became evident that dragons were already associated with military leaders. Gildas, writing in about 540, spoke of the Briton chieftain Maglocunus (Maelgwn Gwynedd in Welsh) as the "insularis draco".

The early Welsh or Brythonic poets, Taliesin and Aneirin both extensively use dragons as an image for military leaders, and for the Britons the word dragon began to take the form of a term for a war leader, prince or ruler. In Y Gododdin, Aneirin describes his patron, Mynyddog Mwynfawr as "the dragon" when he speaks of the "feast of the dragon". He also describes the war leader, Gwernabwy mab Gwen, as the dragon of the battle of Catraeth. Meanwhile, Taliesin, on Urien Rheged, described inexperienced and skilful leaders as dreic dylaw, 'inexperienced dragon' and dreic hylaw, 'skillful dragon' respectively. Owain ap Urien is called Owain ben draic, the chief dragon. Although not compiled until later, the main part of Y Gododdin and the heroic poems on Urien Rheged by Taliesin almost certainly date in origin to the sixth century.

The Welsh term draig, 'dragon' was used to refer to Welsh leaders including Owain Gwynedd, Llywelyn ap Gruffudd (Llywelyn the Last) and "the dragon" Owain Glyndŵr. Cynddelw Brydydd Mawr, a court poet to Owain Gwynedd, refers to him in one elegy, personifying him as "The golden dragon of Snowdonia of eagles".

=== Mabinogion ===
In the Mabinogion story Lludd and Llefelys, the red dragon fights with an invading white dragon. Lludd confines the dragons at Dinas Emrys.

=== Historia Brittonum ===
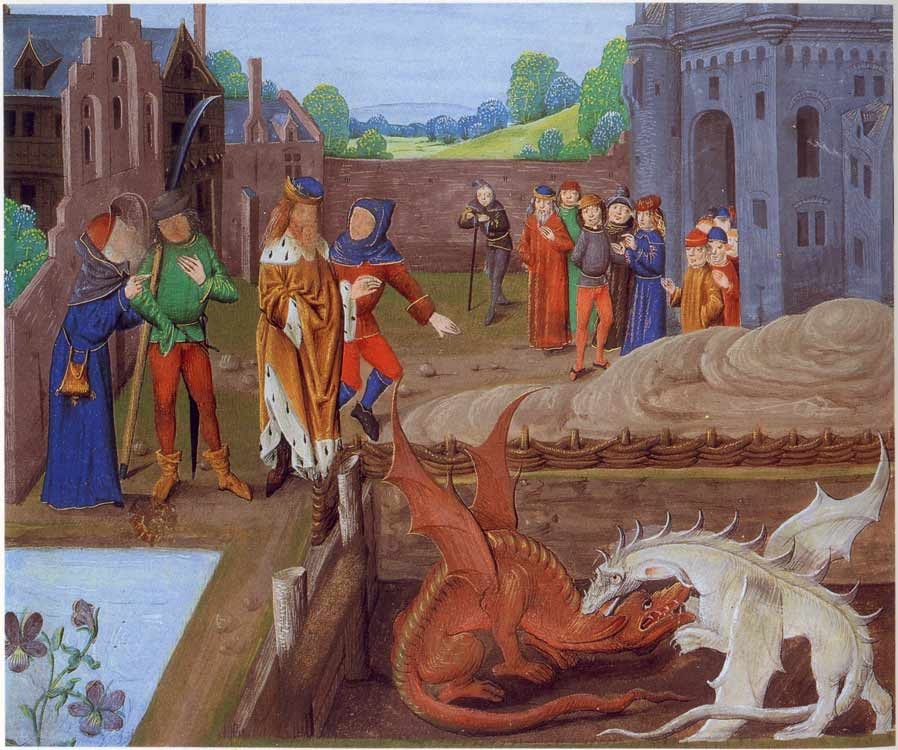
Vortigern and Ambros watch the fight between the red and white dragons: an illustration from a 15th-century manuscript of Geoffrey of Monmouth's History of the Kings of Britain.

The tale is taken up in the Historia Brittonum, written by Nennius. Historia Brittonum was written c. 828, and by this point the dragon was no longer just a military symbol but associated with a coming deliverer from the Saxons. It is also the first time that the colour of the dragon is verifiably given as red. Nevertheless, there may well be an older attribution of red to the colour of the dragon in Y Gododdin. (Note: A passage reads Disgleiryawr ac archawr tal achon//arrud dhreic fud pharaon, which defies clear translation, but Middle Welsh: rud dhreic is widely held to be red dragon, and the word Middle Welsh: pharaon is found in the later Mabinogion work, Lludd and Llefelys, in the passage on the two dragons at Vortigern's tower, suggesting this passage is source material for the Mabinogion account, where the dragon is again described as red.) The story of Lludd and Llefelys in the Mabinogion settles the matter, firmly establishing the red dragon of the Celtic Britons being in opposition with the white dragon of the Saxons.

In chapters 40–42 there is a narrative in which the tyrant Vortigern flees into Wales to escape the Anglo-Saxon invaders. There he chooses a hill-fort as the site for his royal retreat, and attempts to build a citadel, but the structure collapses repeatedly. His wise men tell him he must sacrifice a young boy born without a father on the spot to alleviate the curse. The King sent his soldiers out across the land to find such a lad, and discovers such a boy, Emrys (Ambrosius Aurelianus), but Emrys reveals the real reason for the collapsing towers: a hidden pool containing two dragons, one red and one white, representing the Britons and the Saxons specifically, are buried beneath the foundation. He explains how the White Dragon of the Saxons, though winning the battle at present, would soon be defeated by the Welsh Red Dragon. After Vortigern's downfall, the fort was given to High-King Ambrosius Aurelianus, known in Welsh as Emrys Wledig, hence its name.

=== Geoffrey of Monmouth ===
The same story of the red and white dragons is repeated in Geoffrey of Monmouth's History of the Kings of Britain, where the red dragon is also a prophecy of the coming of King Arthur.

When the later Arthurian legends reached their modern form, Geoffrey of Monmouth, writing in the 12th century for a French and Breton audience, wrote that King Arthur used a golden dragon banner. His standard was also emblazoned with a golden dragon. It is also mentioned in at least four manuscripts that Arthur is associated with the golden dragon, and the standard functions as a haven for wounded soldiers in battles. Geoffrey of Monmouth reports that Arthur used the standard within his vicinity at the rear of the battle for the attention of his wounded soldiers.

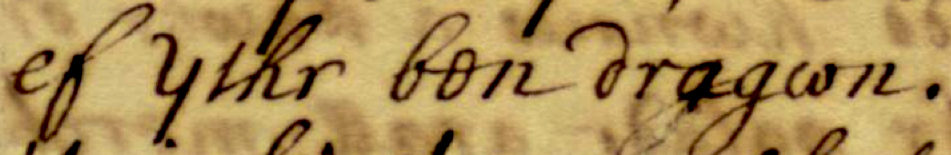
Welsh: "Ythr Ben Dragwn" (translated: Uther, Chief Dragon) in "Dares Phrygius & Brut Tysilio" held at Jesus College, Oxford (Note: This text is found in the Brut Tysilio, a Welsh text which is probably a late reworking of Geoffrey of Monmouth's Historia regum Britanniae. The image comes from a 1695 folio, Jesus College MS. 28, but was transcribed from a 15th century manuscript, Jesus College MS. 61, by Hugh Jones, Underkeeper of the Ashmolean Museum, in 1695.)

=== Owain Glyndŵr ===
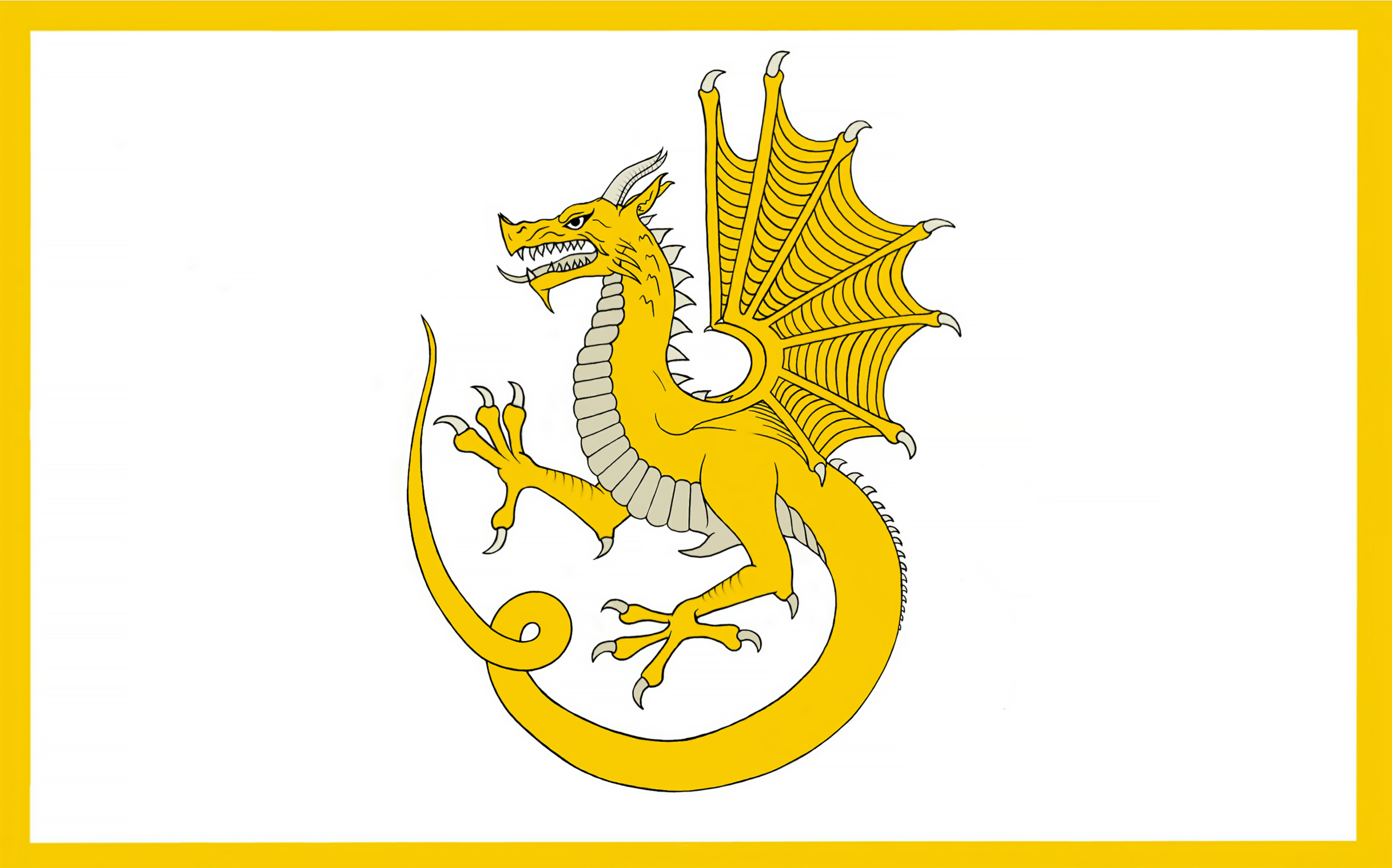
c. 1400 – c. 1416, Y Ddraig Aur, royal standard of Owain Glyndŵr, Prince of Wales, raised over Caernarfon during the Battle of Tuthill in 1401 against the English (Modern image).

Owain Glyndŵr's banner was known as Y Ddraig Aur or 'The Golden Dragon' (Middle English: Gilden Dragoun). It was famously raised over Caernarfon during the Battle of Tuthill in 1401 against the English. Glyndŵr chose to fly the standard of a golden dragon on a white background, the traditional standard that, supposedly, Uther Pendragon had flown when the first Celtic Britons had fought the Saxons to a standstill almost 1,000 years before, and passed down to his son King Arthur. Adam of Usk reports that Glyndŵr's golden dragon was the first use of a dragon standard used in war by Welsh troops on 1 November 1401. Historian John Davies adds that the dragon raised by Glyndŵr was a symbol of victory for the Celtic Britons.

On his seals, Glyndŵr is also depicted with a Welsh dragon on his helmet, his horse's head and his crown. Glyndŵr's Great Seal as Prince of Wales also included a dragon gules on his crest.

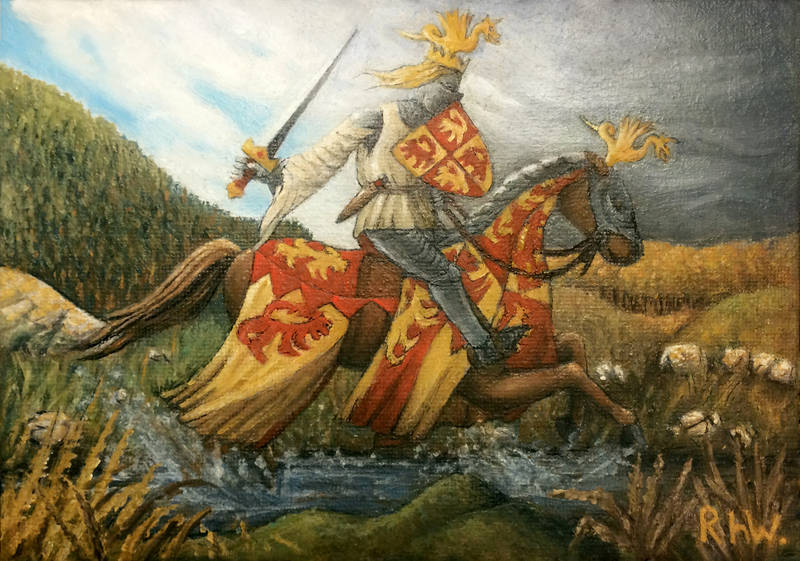
Depiction of Glyndwr as described with a dragon crown and dragon on the head of his horse

=== House of Tudor ===
On Edmund Tudor, 1st Earl of Richmond's tomb is an effigy detailing him wearing a crown affixed with a dragon. Following his son's victory at Bosworth Field, Henry VII used a red dragon on a white and green background upon entering St Paul's. Henry VII used the dragon motif, but this was used as part of the heraldry of the house of Tudor rather than of Wales. The red dragon was used as a supporter on the royal arms of all Tudor sovereigns of England and also appeared on the standards of Henry VII and Henry VIII.

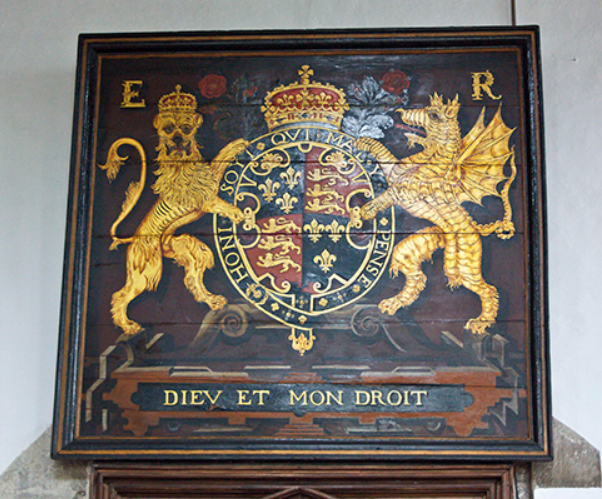
Coat of arms of Elizabeth I in St Thomas's Church, Salisbury

Standard of Henry Tudor used at the Battle of Bosworth Field

Dragon used in arms by the Tudor monarchs

Coat of Arms of Henry VII of England and Wales (1485–1509)

An alternative Coat of Arms of Henry VII of England and Wales (1485–1509)

=== Royal badge ===
The 1953 Royal Badge of Wales

The red dragon did not become an official royal heraldic badge until 1800, when George III issued a royal warrant confirming the badge, blazoned as: On a mount Vert a dragon passant with wings elevated Gules.

T. H. Thomas's pressure for Welsh dragon symbolism contributed to the inclusion of the red dragon on the Prince of Wales badge in 1901. The red dragon appears on a mount but with a label of three points Argent about the shoulder to difference it from the monarch's badge. The badge became a part of the Coat of arms of the Prince of Wales by Royal Warrant.

In 1953, the red dragon badge was given an augmentation of honour. The augmented badge is blazoned: Within a circular riband Argent fimbriated Or bearing the motto Y DDRAIG GOCH DDYRY CYCHWYN ["the red dragon inspires action"], in letters Vert, and ensigned with a representation of the Crown proper, an escutcheon per fesse Argent and Vert and thereon the Red Dragon passant. Winston Churchill, the then prime minister, despised the badge's design, as is revealed in the following Cabinet minute from 1953:

P.M. [Churchill]

Odious design expressing nothing but spite, malice, ill-will and monstrosity.
Words (Red Dragon takes the lead) are untrue and unduly flattering to Bevan.

Ll.G. [Gwilym Lloyd George]

Wd. rather be on R[oyal] Arms. This (dating from Henry VII) will be something.

We get no recognition in Union – badge or flags.

In 1959, Government use of this flag was dropped in favour of the current flag at the urging of the Gorsedd of Bards.

The badge was used by the Wales Office and was printed on Statutory Instruments made by the National Assembly for Wales. The badge was previously used in the corporate logo of the Assembly until the "dynamic dragon" logo was adopted.

This Royal badge was supplanted by a new official Royal badge in 2008, which eliminated the red dragon altogether.

=== Early modern use ===
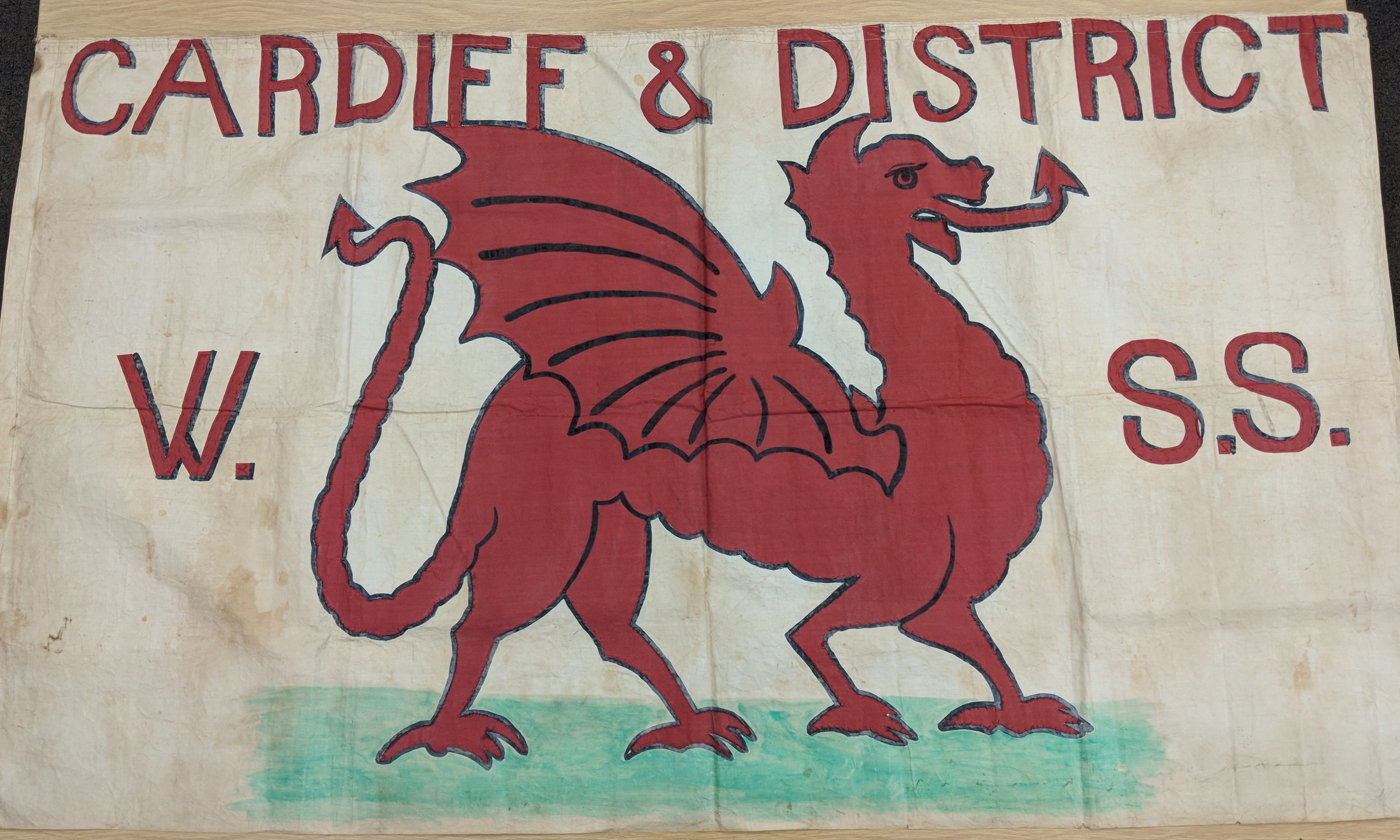
1908 banner of the Cardiff & District Women's Suffrage Society

In the 1909 national pageant of Wales, the Welsh dragon appears upright on a white background. The Welsh dragon that appears on the flag on board Captain Scott's Terra Nova is also an upright dragon (sergeant) on a white and green background. Up until this point, there was no standardised version of the Welsh dragon. The dragon was used on banners during women's suffrage events in Wales in the 1900s and 1910s. The banner's accession documents included a note from one of the former members "The banner was worked by Mrs Henry Lewis… [she] was also President of the South Wales Federation of Women's Suffrage Societies + she led the S. Wales section of the great Suffrage Procession in London on 17 June 1911, walking in front of her own beautiful banner… It was a great occasion, some 40,000 to 50,000 men + women taking part in the walk from Whitehall through Pall Mall, St James's Street + Piccadilly to the Albert Hall. The dragon attracted much attention – “Here comes the Devil” was the greeting of one group of on lookers."

== Current use ==
=== Flag of Wales ===
Y Ddraig Goch

As an emblem, the red dragon of Wales is present on the national flag of Wales, which became an official flag in 1959.

=== Welsh Seal ===
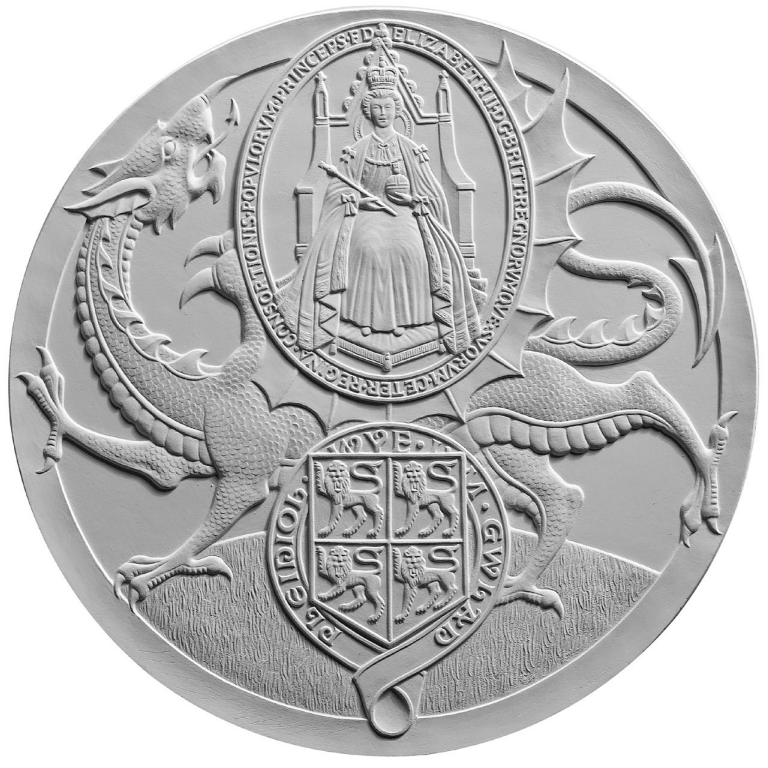
The Welsh Seal during the reign of Elizabeth II.

The red dragon of Wales appears on the Welsh Seal struck in 2011 during the reign of Queen Elizabeth II.

=== Senedd and Welsh government logos ===
The emblem (or logo) used by the Welsh Government executive is that of the Welsh dragon. According to their guidance, the "logo consists of a dragon and Welsh Government name separated by a horizontal line, positioned together in a fixed relationship which must not be altered. These elements are aligned centrally with each other. The logo is always bilingual regardless of the language of the material it appears on." They also mention, "The dragon must always face to the left".

The Senedd, the Welsh Parliament (formerly the National Assembly for Wales), uses a logo depicting of a stylised dynamic dragon.

=== Welsh language society ===
Tafod y Ddraig (Tongue of the dragon) is a symbol which represents the Welsh Language Society.

=== Wales football ===
The Welsh dragon, "the most iconic of Welsh emblems", is also used as the official emblem or logo of the Football Association of Wales which was redesigned in 2019.

== Mottos ==
The motto "Anorchfygol Ddraig Cymru" ("Unconquerable Dragon of Wales') is associated with the red dragon.

The motto "Y ddraig goch ddyry cychwyn" ("The red dragon will show the way"). This motto is in the strict poetic metre of cynghanedd. [The alternative translation "the red dragon inspires action" is mentioned above under the heading "Royal Seal". It is also found in other sources.]

== Gallery ==
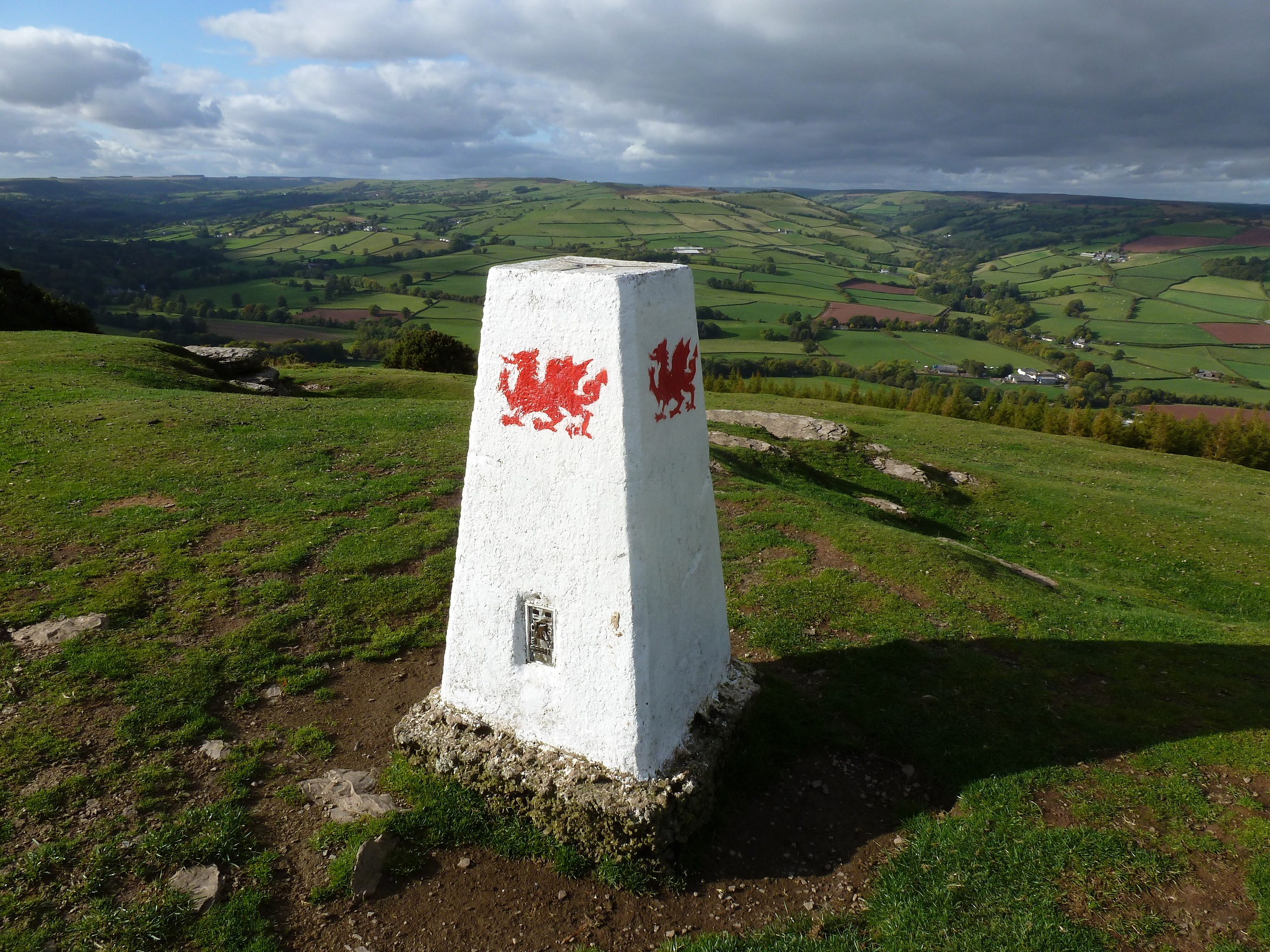
The Welsh Dragon on a trig point at Twyn y Gaer hill fort, Mynydd Illtud

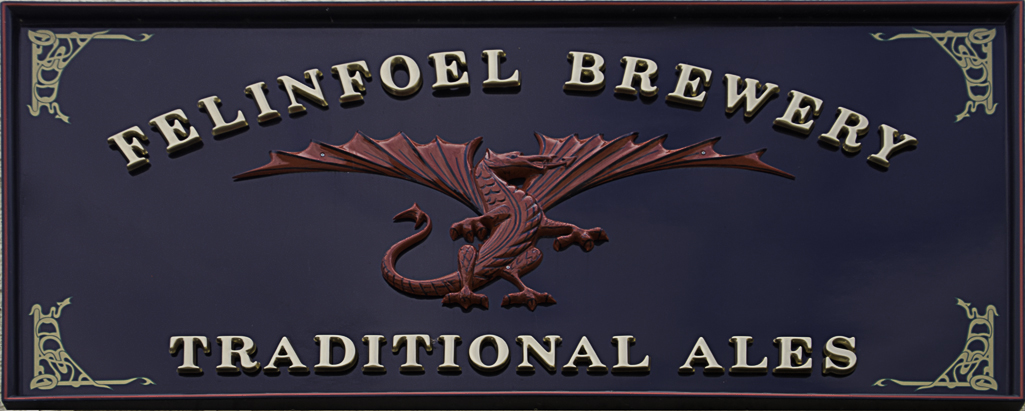
The Welsh Dragon motif of Felinfoel Brewery

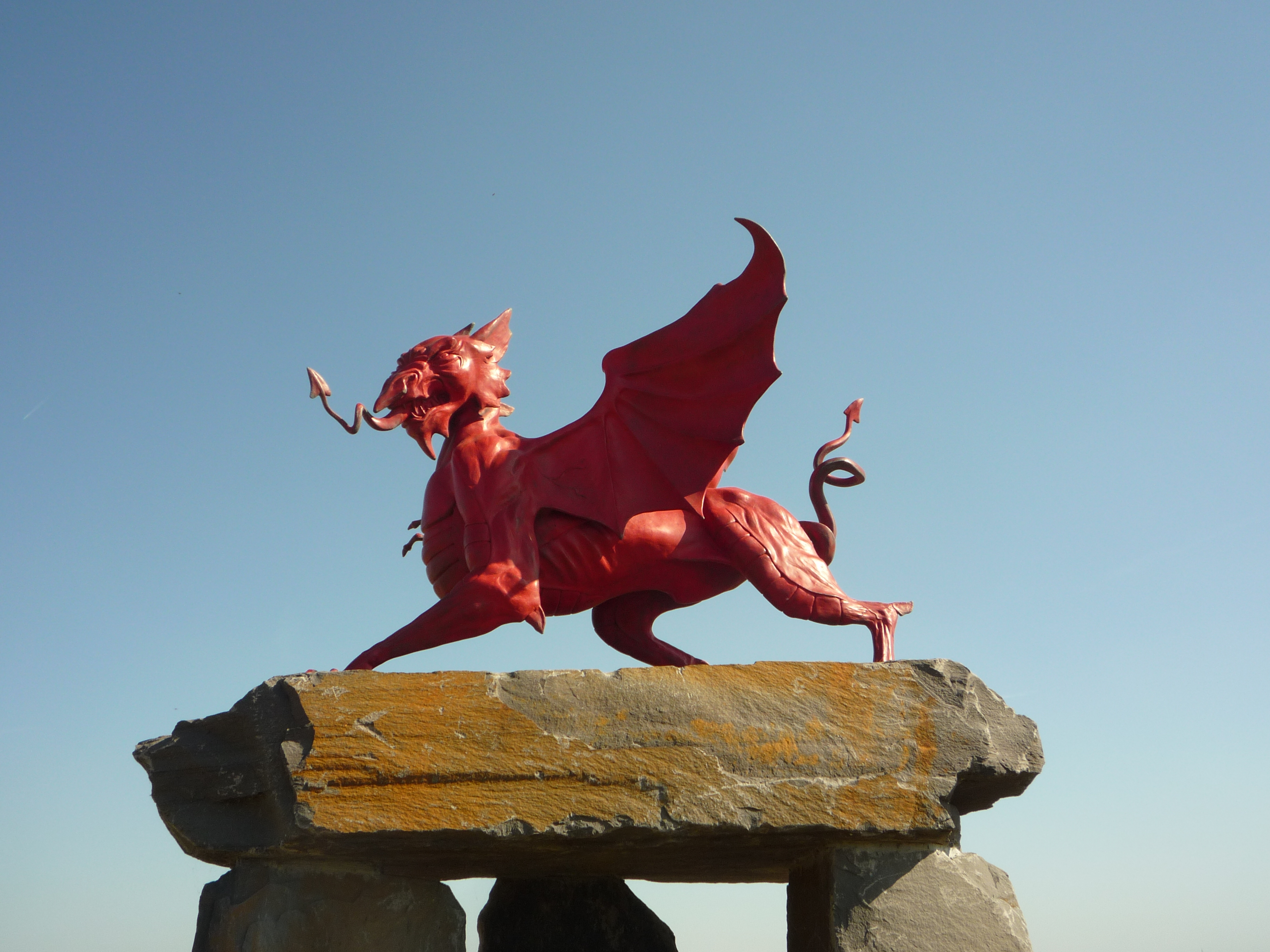
Red Dragon sculpture, Welsh Memorial Park, Ypres

Flag of Cardiff

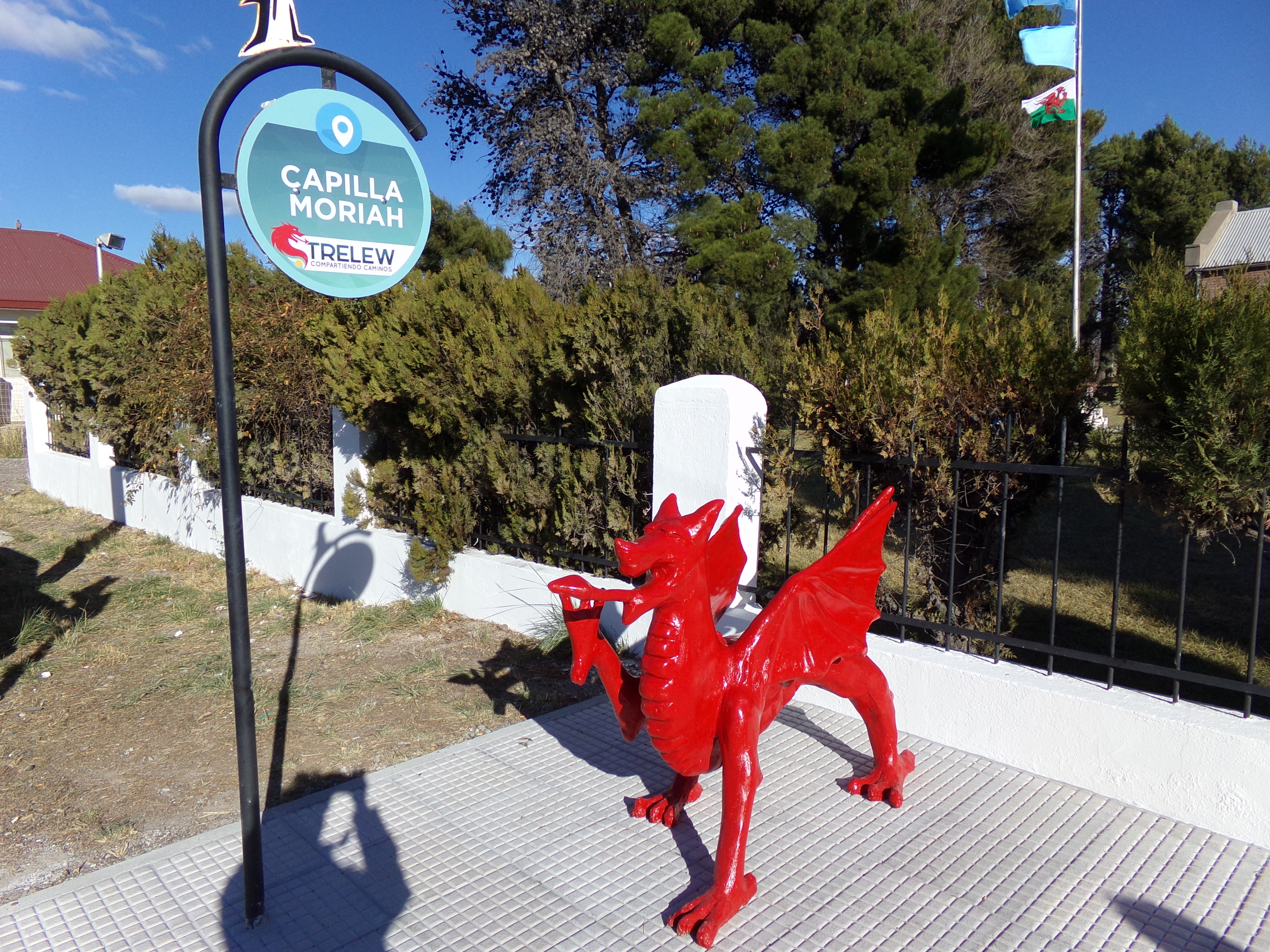
A statue of the Welsh Dragon at Capel Moriah, Trelew, Patagonia

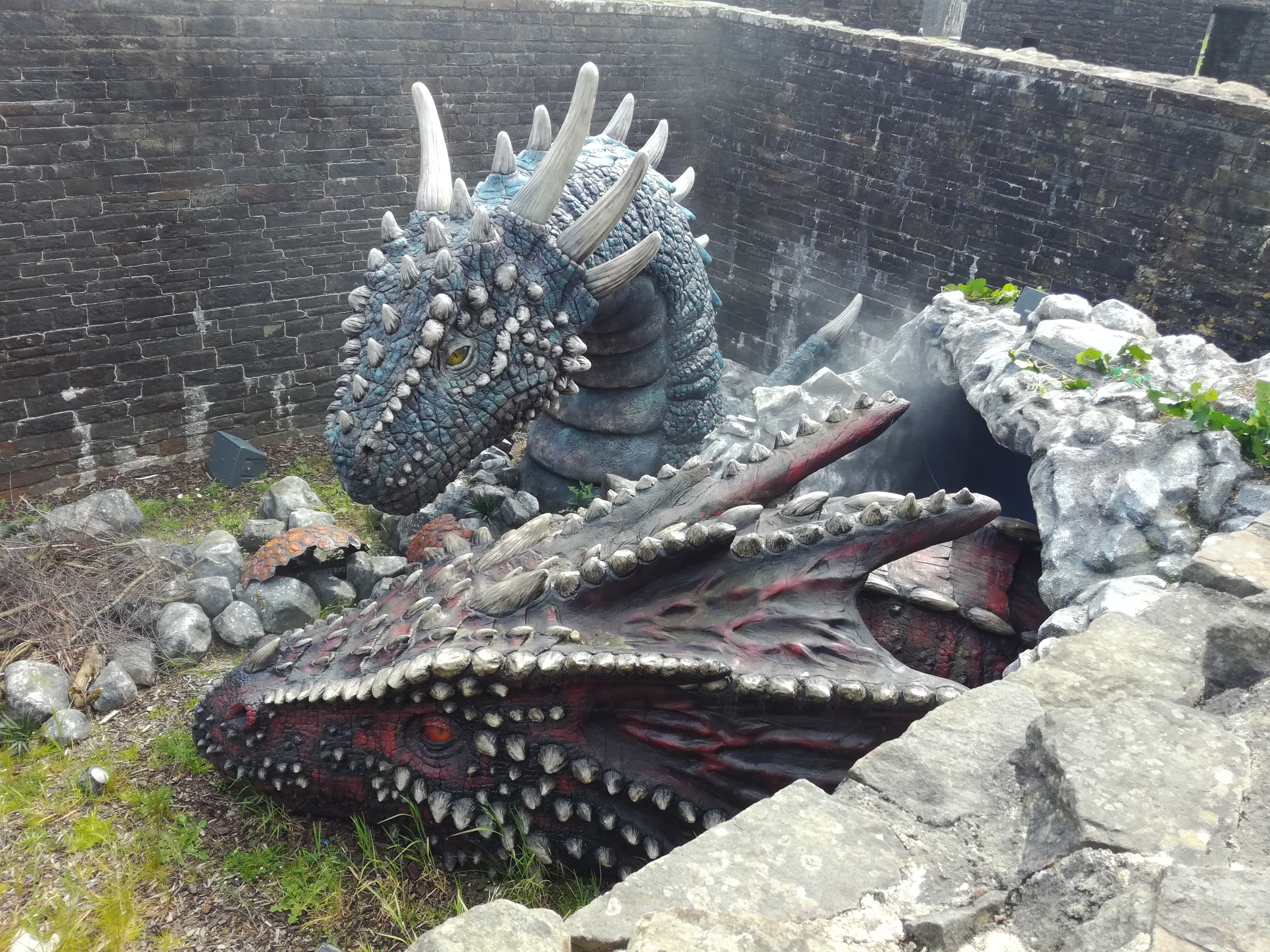
Dragons at Caerphilly Castle

House flag of Cory Brothers

House flag of John Byford and Son

Red Dragon Queen's Beast

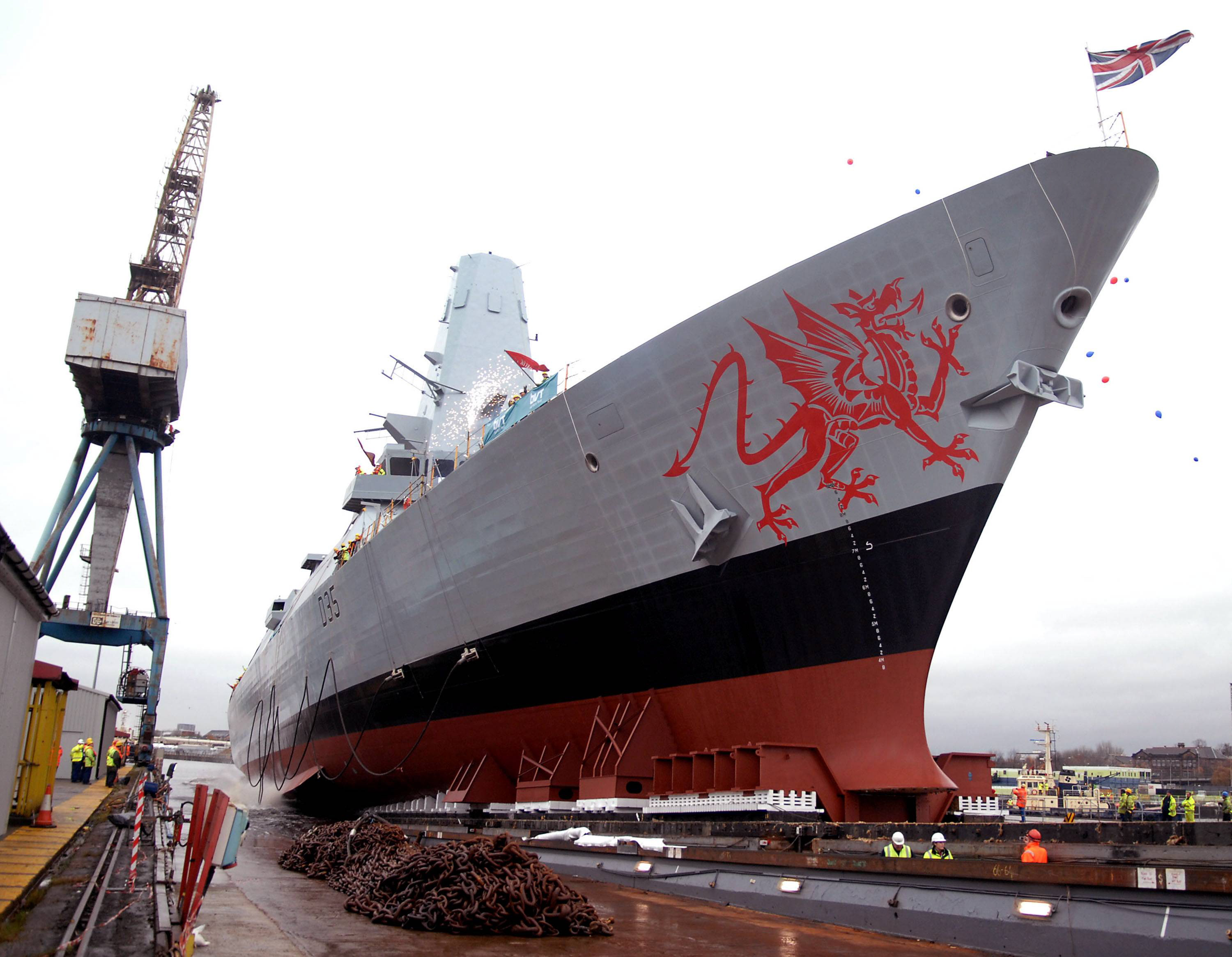
Welsh Dragon painted on the bow of HMS Dragon (D35)

== Bibliography ==
- Gantz, Jeffrey (translator) (1987). The Mabinogion. New York: Penguin. ISBN 0-14-044322-3.
- Jobbins, Siôn T. (2016), The Red Dragon: The story of the Welsh flag, Tal-y-bont: Y Lolfa
- Lofmark, Carl (1995), A History of the Red Dragon, Llanrwst: Gwasg Carreg Gwalch, ISBN 0-86381-317-8
- Koch, John T. (2006). Celtic Culture: A Historical Encyclopedia. ABC-CLIO. ISBN 1-85109-440-7.
