= Y Bandana =

Welsh alternative rock band

- Origin: Caernarfon, Wales
- Genres: Alternative rock
- Years active: 2008–2016
- Label: Copa (imprint of Sain)
- Members: Tomos Owens; Siôn Owens; Gwilym Bowen Rhys; Robin Jones
- Website: http://www.myspace.com/ybandana

Y Bandana are a Welsh language alternative rock band that formed in Caernarfon in 2008. The band is composed of brothers Tomos Owens (keyboard) and Siôn Owens (bass guitar), their cousin Gwilym Bowen Rhys (lead vocals, guitar) and Robin Jones (percussion). They are known for combining humorous lyrics with catchy melodies.

The band have achieved great success in the Welsh language rock scene and have been the recipients of numerous awards, including awards from the Welsh-language magazine "Y Selar" for best song three years running ("Cân y Tân" 2010, "Wyt ti'n nabod Mr Pei?" 2011, "Heno yn yr Anglesey" 2012) and best band three times in 2010, 2011 and 2012 as well as the award for best single 2012. They featured frequently at the Maes B festival during the annual National Eisteddfod, with their ninth consecutive - and final - appearance in August 2016 at Abergavenny. Shortly before the Eisteddfod, the band announced they would disband at the end of the year, with their last gig performed in their hometown in October 2016.

They have since performed at a reunion gig in the National Eisteddfod 2026.

The band was awarded in four categories in 'Gwobrau'r Selar 2016': Best Band; Best Song - Cyn i'r lle ma gau; Best Album - Fel Tôn Gron; Best Artwork - Fel Tôn Gron.

Robin Jones is now a member of the band Bwncath. Gwilym Bowen Rhys is also a member of the folk band Plu with his sisters Elan and Marged, and his first solo album came out in August 2016. Siôn Owens was also a member of the band Umaar and now often performs with Bwncath.

== Discography ==
Albums
| Name | English Translation | Length | Year released | Notes |
|---|---|---|---|---|
| Y Bandana | The Bandana | 41:41 | 2011 | Debut Album |
| Bywyd Gwyn | White Life | 37:42 | 2013 | |
| Fel Tôn Gron | Like a Round Tone | 33:43 | 2016 | |

Singles and EPs
| Name | English Translation | B-Side | Length | Year released | Notes |
|---|---|---|---|---|---|
| Dal dy Drwyn | Hold Your Nose | Cân y Tân | 8:38 | 2010 | |
| Heno Yn Yr Anglesey | Tonight In Anglesey | Geiban | 8:05 | 2012 | |
| Mari Sâl | Sick Mary | Tafod Y Tonnau | 5:59 | 2014 | |
