= Edward I =

King of England from 1272 to 1307

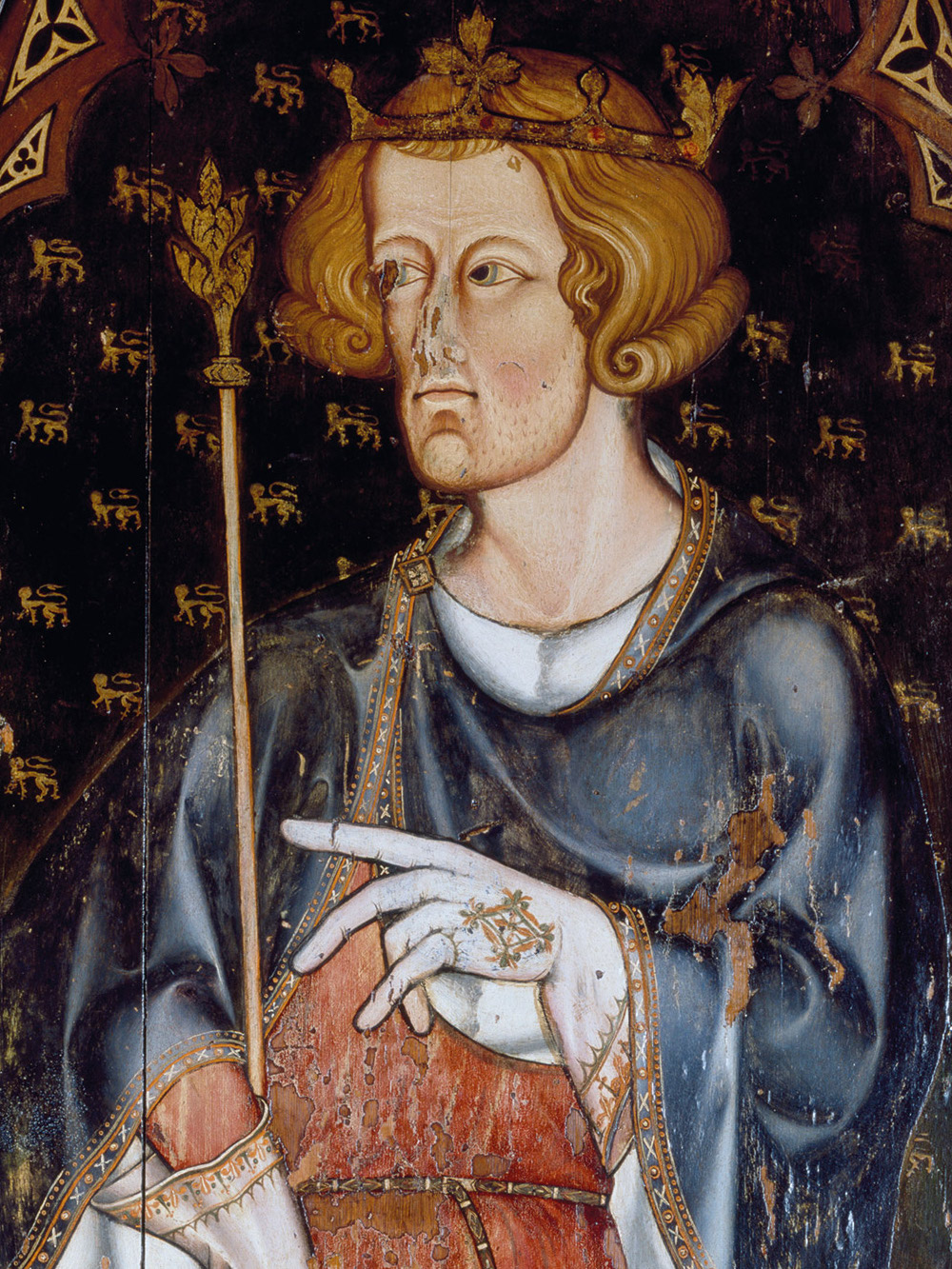
- Portrait in Westminster Abbey probably depicting Edward I, installed during his reign

King of England
- Reign: 20 November 1272 – 7 July 1307
- Coronation: 19 August 1274
- Predecessor: Henry III
- Successor: Edward II
- Born: 17/18 June 1239; Palace of Westminster, London, England
- Died: 7 July 1307 (aged 68); Burgh by Sands, Cumberland, England
- Burial: 27 October 1307; Westminster Abbey, London
- Spouses: Eleanor of Castile (m. 1254; died 1290) Margaret of France (m. 1299)
- Issue more...: Henry of England; Eleanor, Countess of Bar; Joan, Countess of Hertford; Alphonso, Earl of Chester; Margaret, Duchess of Brabant; Berengaria of England; Mary of Woodstock; Elizabeth, Countess of Holland; Edward II, King of England; Thomas, Earl of Norfolk; Edmund, Earl of Kent
- House: Plantagenet
- Father: Henry III of England
- Mother: Eleanor of Provence
- Military career
- Conflicts: Second Barons' War; Battle of Lewes (POW); Battle of Evesham; Siege of Kenilworth; Lord Edward's crusade; Siege of Tripoli (1271); Battle of Qaqun; Conquest of Wales; Ring of Iron; Gascon War; First War of Scottish Independence; Sack of Berwick; Battle of Dunbar; Battle of Falkirk; Siege of Caerlaverock; Siege of Stirling Castle

Edward I (17/18 June 1239 – 7 July 1307), also known as Edward Longshanks and the Hammer of the Scots (Latin: Malleus Scotorum), was King of England from 1272 to 1307. Concurrently, he was Lord of Ireland, and from 1254 to 1306 ruled Gascony as Duke of Aquitaine in his capacity as a vassal of the French king. Before his accession to the throne, he was commonly referred to as the Lord Edward.

The eldest son of Henry III, Edward was involved from an early age in the political intrigues of his father's reign. In 1259, he briefly sided with a baronial reform movement, supporting the Provisions of Oxford. After reconciling with his father, he remained loyal throughout the subsequent armed conflict, known as the Second Barons' War. After the Battle of Lewes, Edward was held hostage by the rebellious barons, but escaped after a few months and defeated the baronial leader Simon de Montfort at the Battle of Evesham in 1265. Within two years, the rebellion was extinguished and, with England pacified, Edward left to join the Ninth Crusade to the Holy Land in 1270. He was on his way home in 1272 when he was informed of his father's death. Making a slow return, he reached England in 1274 and was crowned at Westminster Abbey.

Edward spent much of his reign reforming royal administration and common law. Through an extensive legal inquiry, he investigated the tenure of several feudal liberties. The law was reformed through a series of statutes regulating criminal and property law, but the King's attention was increasingly drawn towards military affairs. After suppressing a minor conflict in Wales in 1276–77, Edward responded to a second one in 1282–83 by conquering Wales. He then established English rule, built castles and towns in the countryside and settled them with English people. After the death of the heir to the Scottish throne, Edward was invited to arbitrate a succession dispute. He claimed feudal suzerainty over Scotland and invaded the country, and the ensuing First Scottish War of Independence continued after his death. Simultaneously, Edward found himself at war with France (a Scottish ally) after King Philip IV confiscated the Duchy of Gascony. The duchy was eventually recovered but the conflict relieved English military pressure against Scotland. By the mid-1290s, extensive military campaigns required high levels of taxation and this met with both lay and ecclesiastical opposition in England. In Ireland, he had extracted soldiers, supplies and money, leaving decay, lawlessness and a revival of the fortunes of his enemies in Gaelic territories. When the King died in 1307, he left to his son Edward II a war with Scotland and other financial and political burdens.

Edward's temperamental nature and height (6 ft 2 in, 188 cm) made him an intimidating figure. He often instilled fear in his contemporaries, although he held the respect of his subjects for the way he embodied the medieval ideal of kingship as a soldier, an administrator, and a man of faith. Modern historians are divided in their assessment of Edward; some have praised him for his contribution to the law and administration, but others have criticised his uncompromising attitude towards his nobility. Edward is credited with many accomplishments, including restoring royal authority after the reign of Henry III and establishing Parliament as a permanent institution, which allowed for a functional system for raising taxes and reforming the law through statutes. At the same time, he is often condemned for vindictiveness, opportunism and untrustworthiness in his dealings with Wales and Scotland, coupled with a colonialist approach to their governance and to Ireland, and for antisemitic policies leading to the 1290 Edict of Expulsion, which expelled all Jews from England.

== Early years, 1239–1263 ==
=== Childhood and marriage ===
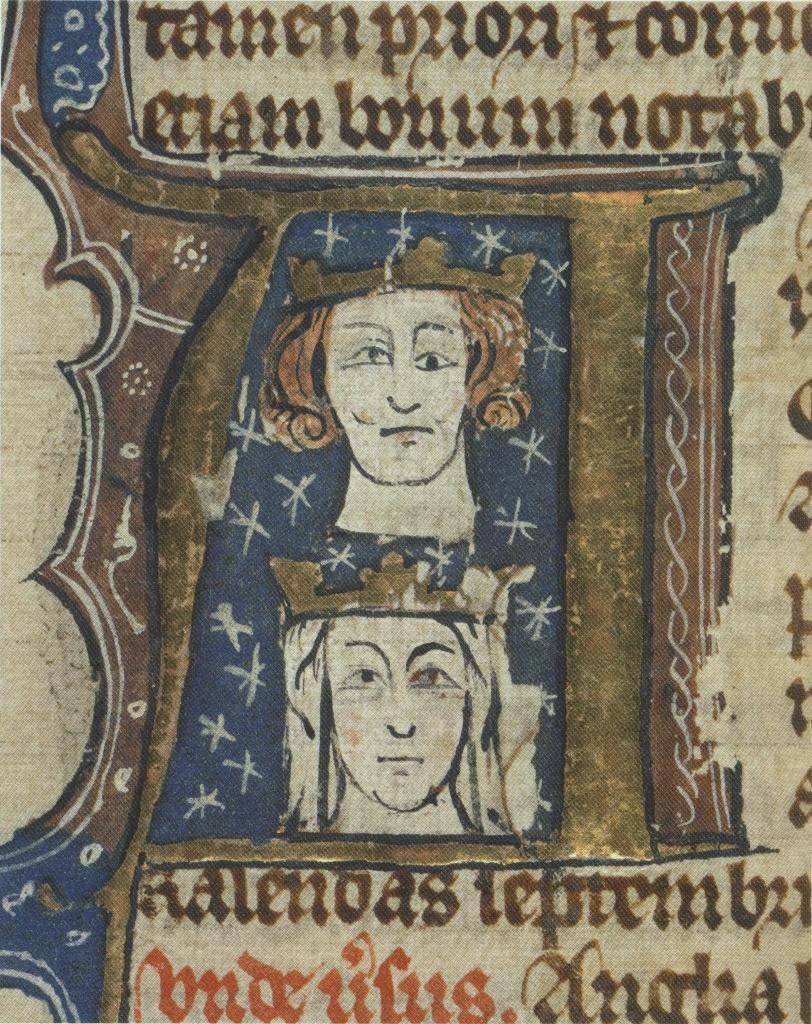
Early 14th-century manuscript initial showing Edward and his first wife Eleanor of Castile. The artist has perhaps tried to depict Edward's blepharoptosis (drooping eyelid), a trait he inherited from his father.

Edward was born on the night of 17–18 June 1239 at the Palace of Westminster, to King Henry III and Eleanor of Provence. Edward, an Anglo-Saxon name, was not commonly given among the aristocracy of England after the Norman Conquest, but Henry was devoted to the veneration of Edward the Confessor and decided to name his firstborn son after the saint. Edward's birth was widely celebrated at the royal court and throughout England, and he was baptised three days later at Westminster Abbey. He was commonly referred to as the Lord Edward until his accession to the throne in 1272. Among his childhood friends was his cousin Henry of Almain, son of King Henry's brother Richard of Cornwall. Henry of Almain remained a close companion of the prince for the rest of his life. Edward was placed in the care of Hugh Giffard – father of the future Chancellor Godfrey Giffard – until Bartholomew Pecche took over at Giffard's death in 1246. The details of Edward's upbringing are unknown, but he received an education typical of an aristocratic boy his age, including in military studies.

There were concerns about Edward's health as a child, and he fell ill in 1246, 1247, and 1251. Nonetheless, he grew up to become a strong, athletic, and imposing man. At 6 ft 2 in (188 cm) he towered over most of his contemporaries, hence his epithet "Longshanks", meaning "long legs" or "long shins". The historian Michael Prestwich states that his "long arms gave him an advantage as a swordsman, long thighs one as a horseman. In youth, his curly hair was blond; in maturity it darkened, and in old age it turned white. The regularity of his features was marred by a drooping left eyelid ... His speech, despite a lisp, was said to be persuasive."

In 1254, English fears of a Castilian invasion of the English-held province of Gascony induced King Henry to arrange a politically expedient marriage between fifteen-year-old Edward and thirteen-year-old Eleanor, the half-sister of King Alfonso X of Castile. They were married on 1 November 1254 in the Abbey of Santa María la Real de Las Huelgas in Castile. As part of the marriage agreement, Alfonso X gave up his claims to Gascony, and Edward received grants of land worth 15,000 marks a year. (Note: A medieval English mark was an accounting unit equivalent to two-thirds of a pound sterling.) The marriage eventually led to the English acquisition of Ponthieu in 1279 upon Eleanor's inheritance of the county. Henry made sizeable endowments to Edward in 1254, including Gascony; most of Ireland, which was granted to Edward, while making the claim for the first time that dominion of Ireland would never be separated from the English crown; and much land in Wales and England, including the Earldom of Chester. They offered Edward little independence, for Henry retained much control over the land, particularly in Ireland, and benefited from most of the income from those lands. Split control caused problems. Between 1254 and 1272, eleven different Justiciars were appointed to head the Irish government, encouraging further conflict and instability; corruption rose to very high levels. In Gascony, Simon de Montfort, 6th Earl of Leicester, had been appointed as royal lieutenant in 1253 and drew its income, so Edward derived neither authority nor revenue from this province. Around the end of November 1254, Edward and Eleanor left Castile and entered Gascony, where they were warmly received by the populace. Here, Edward styled himself as "ruling Gascony as prince and lord", a move that the historian J. S. Hamilton states was a show of his blooming political independence.

From 1254 to 1257, Edward was under the influence of his mother's relatives, known as the Savoyards, the most notable of whom was Peter II of Savoy, the Queen's uncle. After 1257, Edward became increasingly close to the Lusignan faction – the half-brothers of his father Henry III – led by such men as William de Valence. (Note: Henry III's mother Isabella of Angoulême married Hugh X of Lusignan after the death of King John of England.) The two groups of privileged foreigners were resented by the established English aristocracy, who would be at the centre of the ensuing years' baronial reform movement. Edward's ties to his Lusignan kinsmen were viewed unfavourably by contemporaries, including the chronicler Matthew Paris, who circulated tales of unruly and violent conduct by Edward's inner circle, raising questions about his personal qualities.

=== Early ambitions ===
Edward showed independence in political matters as early as 1255, when he sided with the Soler family in Gascony in their conflict with the Colomb family. This ran contrary to his father's policy of mediation between the local factions. In May 1258, a group of magnates drew up a document for reform of the King's government – the so-called Provisions of Oxford – largely directed against the Lusignans. Edward stood by his political allies and strongly opposed the Provisions. The reform movement succeeded in limiting the Lusignan influence, and Edward's attitude gradually changed. In March 1259, he entered into a formal alliance with one of the main reformers, Richard de Clare, 6th Earl of Gloucester, and on 15 October announced that he supported the barons' goals and their leader, the Earl of Leicester.

The motive behind Edward's change of heart could have been purely pragmatic: the Earl of Leicester was in a good position to support his cause in Gascony. When the King left for France in November, Edward's behaviour turned into pure insubordination. He made several appointments to advance the cause of the reformers, and his father believed that Edward was considering a coup d'état. When Henry returned from France, he initially refused to see his son, but through the mediation of Richard of Cornwall and Boniface, Archbishop of Canterbury, the two were eventually reconciled. Edward was sent abroad to France, and in November 1260 he again united with the Lusignans, who had been exiled there.

Back in England, early in 1262, Edward fell out with some of his former Lusignan allies over financial matters. The next year, King Henry sent him on a campaign in Wales against the Welsh prince Llywelyn ap Gruffudd, but Edward's forces were besieged in northern Wales and achieved only limited results. Around the same time, Leicester, who had been out of the country since 1261, returned to England and reignited the baronial reform movement. As the King seemed ready to give in to the barons' demands, Edward began to take control of the situation. From his previously unpredictable and equivocating attitude, he changed to one of firm devotion to protection of his father's royal rights. He reunited with some of the men he had alienated the year before – including Henry of Almain and John de Warenne, 6th Earl of Surrey – and retook Windsor Castle from the rebels. Through the arbitration of King Louis IX of France an agreement was made between the two parties. This Mise of Amiens was largely favourable to the royalist side and would cause further conflict.

== Civil war and crusades, 1264–1273 ==
=== Second Barons' War ===
From 1264 to 1267 the Second Barons' War was fought between baronial forces led by the Earl of Leicester and those who remained loyal to the King. Edward initiated the fighting by capturing the rebel-held city of Gloucester. When Robert de Ferrers, 6th Earl of Derby, came to the assistance of the baronial forces, Edward negotiated a truce with the Earl. Edward later broke the terms of the agreement. He then captured Northampton from Simon de Montfort the Younger before embarking on a retaliatory campaign against Derby's lands. The baronial and royalist forces met at the Battle of Lewes, on 14 May 1264. Edward, commanding the right wing, performed well, and soon defeated the London contingent of the Earl of Leicester's forces. Unwisely, he pursued the scattered enemy, and on his return found the rest of the royal army defeated. By the Mise of Lewes, Edward and his cousin Henry of Almain were given up as hostages to Leicester.

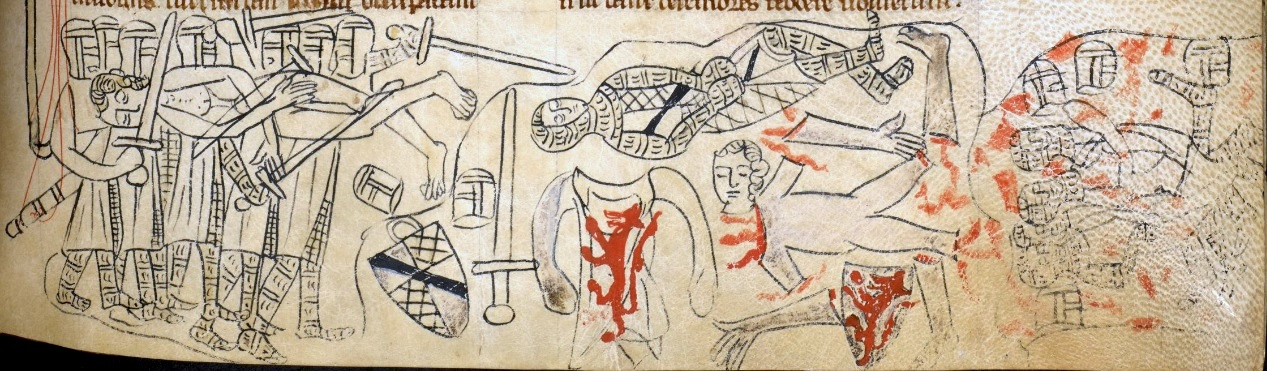
Medieval manuscript showing the Earl of Leicester's mutilated body at the field of Evesham

Edward remained in captivity until March 1265, and after his release was kept under strict surveillance. In Hereford, he escaped on 28 May while out riding and joined up with Gilbert de Clare, 7th Earl of Gloucester, who had recently defected to the King's side. The Earl of Leicester's support was now dwindling, and Edward retook Worcester and Gloucester with little effort. Meanwhile, Leicester had made an alliance with Llywelyn and started moving east to join forces with his son Simon. Edward made a surprise attack at Kenilworth Castle, where the younger Montfort was quartered, before moving on to cut off the Earl of Leicester. The two forces then met at the Battle of Evesham, on 4 August 1265. The Earl of Leicester stood little chance against the superior royal forces, and after his defeat he was killed and his corpse mutilated on the field.

Through such episodes as the deception of Derby at Gloucester, Edward acquired a reputation as untrustworthy. During the summer campaign he began to learn from his mistakes and gained the respect and admiration of contemporaries through actions such as showing clemency towards his enemies. The war did not end with the Earl of Leicester's death, and Edward participated in the continued campaigning. At Christmas, he came to terms with Simon the Younger and his associates at the Isle of Axholme in Lincolnshire, and in March 1266 he led a successful assault on the Cinque Ports. A contingent of rebels held out in the virtually impregnable Kenilworth Castle and did not surrender until the drafting of the conciliatory Dictum of Kenilworth in October 1266. (Note: The Dictum restored land to the disinherited rebels, in exchange for a fine decided by their level of involvement in the wars.) In April it seemed as if the Earl of Gloucester would take up the cause of the reform movement, and civil war would resume, but after a renegotiation of the terms of the Dictum of Kenilworth, the parties came to an agreement. (Note: The essential concession was that the disinherited would now be allowed to take possession of their lands before paying the fines.) Around this time, Edward was made steward of England and began to exercise influence in the government. He was also appointed Lord Warden of the Cinque Ports in 1265. Despite this, he was little involved in the settlement negotiations following the wars as he was planning his forthcoming crusade.

=== Crusade and accession ===
Map of the Holy Land depicting operations during Edward's Crusade: Mamluks Crusaders Mongols

Edward pledged himself to undertake a crusade in an elaborate ceremony on 24 June 1268, with his brother Edmund Crouchback and cousin Henry of Almain. Some of Edward's former adversaries, such as John de Vescy and the 7th Earl of Gloucester, similarly committed themselves, although some, like Gloucester, did not ultimately participate. With the country pacified, the greatest impediment to the project was funding. King Louis IX of France, who was the leader of the crusade, provided a loan of about £17,500. (Note: The price of 50,000 cows, or 23,000 horses.) This was not enough, and the rest had to be raised through a direct tax on the laity, which had not been levied since 1237. In May 1270, Parliament granted a tax of one-twentieth of all movable property; in exchange the King agreed to reconfirm Magna Carta, and to impose restrictions on Jewish money lending. (Note: The May 1270 Parliament confirmed an ordinance drafted at the Hilary Parliament of January 1269 preventing Jewish moneylenders from creating rent charges on debtors' lands, which often led debtors to lose the land itself.) On 20 August Edward sailed from Dover for France. Historians have not determined the size of his accompanying force with any certainty, but it was probably fewer than 1000 men, including around 225 knights.

Originally, the Crusaders intended to relieve the beleaguered Christian stronghold of Acre in Palestine, but King Louis and his brother Charles of Anjou, the king of Sicily, decided to attack the emirate of Tunis to establish a stronghold in North Africa. The plan failed when the French forces were struck by an epidemic which, on 25 August, killed Louis. (Note: The disease was either dysentery or typhus.) By the time Edward arrived at Tunis, Charles had already signed the Treaty of Tunis with the Emir, and there was little to do but return to Sicily. Further military action was postponed until the following spring, but a devastating storm off the coast of Sicily dissuaded both Charles and Philip III, Louis's successor, from any further campaigning. Edward decided to continue alone, and on 9 May 1271 he landed at Acre.

The Christian situation in the Holy Land was precarious. Jerusalem had been reconquered by the Muslims in 1244, and Acre was now the centre of the Kingdom of Jerusalem. The Muslim states were on the offensive under the Mamluk leadership of Baibars, and were threatening Acre. Edward's men were an important addition to the garrison, but they stood little chance against Baibars's superior forces, and an initial raid at nearby St Georges-de-Lebeyne in June was largely futile. An embassy to Abaqa, the Ilkhan of the Mongols, helped bring about an attack on Aleppo in the north, which distracted Baibars's forces. The Mongol invasion ultimately failed. In November, Edward led a raid on Qaqun, which could have served as a bridgehead to Jerusalem, but this was unsuccessful. The situation in Acre grew desperate, and in May 1272 Hugh III of Cyprus, the nominal king of Jerusalem, signed a ten-year truce with Baibars. Edward was initially defiant, but in June 1272 he was the victim of an assassination attempt by a member of the Syrian Order of Assassins, supposedly ordered by Baibars. He managed to kill the assassin, but was struck in the arm by a dagger feared to be poisoned, and was severely weakened over the following months. This persuaded Edward to abandon the campaign. (Note: The anecdote of Queen Eleanor saving Edward's life by sucking the poison out of his wound is almost certainly a later fabrication. Other accounts of the scene have Eleanor being led away weeping by John de Vescy, and suggest that it was another of Edward's close friends, Otto de Grandson, who attempted to suck the poison from the wound.)

On 24 September 1272 Edward left Acre. Shortly after arriving in Sicily, he was met with the news that his father had died on 16 November. Edward was deeply saddened by this news, but rather than hurrying home, he made a leisurely journey northwards. This was due partly to his still-poor health, but also to a lack of urgency. The political situation in England was stable after the mid-century upheavals, and Edward was proclaimed king after his father's death, rather than at his own coronation, as had until then been customary. (Note: Though no written proof exists, it is assumed that this arrangement was agreed on before Edward's departure.) In Edward's absence, the country was governed by a royal council, led by Robert Burnell. Edward passed through Italy and France, visiting Pope Gregory X and paying homage to Philip III in Paris for his French domains. Edward travelled by way of Savoy to receive homage from his great-uncle Count Philip I for castles in the Alps held by a treaty of 1246.

Edward then journeyed to Gascony to put down a revolt headed by Gaston de Béarn. While there, he launched an investigation into his feudal possessions, which, as Hamilton puts it, reflects "Edward's keen interest in administrative efficiency ... [and] reinforced Edward's position as lord in Aquitaine and strengthened the bonds of loyalty between the king-duke and his subjects". Around the same time, the King organised political alliances with the kingdoms in Iberia. His four-year-old daughter Eleanor was promised in marriage to Alfonso, the heir to the Crown of Aragon, and Edward's heir Henry was betrothed to Joan, heiress to the Kingdom of Navarre. Neither union would come to fruition. On 2 August 1274 Edward returned to England, landing at Dover. The thirty-five-year-old king held his coronation on 19 August at Westminster Abbey, alongside Queen Eleanor. Immediately after being anointed and crowned by Robert Kilwardby, the Archbishop of Canterbury, Edward removed his crown, saying that he did not intend to wear it again until he had recovered all the crown lands that his father had surrendered during his reign.

== Early reign, 1274–1296 ==
=== Conquest of Wales ===
Wales after the Treaty of Montgomery of 1267: Gwynedd, Llywelyn ap Gruffudd's principality Territories conquered by Llywelyn ap Gruffudd Territories of Llywelyn's vassals Lordships of the Marcher barons Lordships of the King of England Kingdom of England

Llywelyn ap Gruffudd enjoyed a temporary advantage after the Barons' War. The 1267 Treaty of Montgomery recognised his ownership of land he had conquered in the Four Cantrefs of Perfeddwlad and his title of Prince of Wales. However, his administration was heavy-handed and unpopular, especially among Welshmen on the Marches, where Llywelyn resorted to hostage-taking and intimidation to retain his domination. He also entered into a damaging conflict with the Welsh church, further undermining his authority. Armed conflicts continued on the March. In 1272 Llywelyn suffered a major defeat to the Earl of Gloucester, Gilbert de Clare, and was forced to evacuate south-east Wales. This setback triggered a failed attempt to assassinate the prince, exposing divisions in his principality. The chief suspects, his younger brother Dafydd and Gruffudd ap Gwenwynwyn of Powys, fled to take refuge at the English court. Citing ongoing hostilities and Edward's harbouring of his enemies, Llywelyn refused to do homage to the King. For Edward, a further provocation came from Llywelyn's planned marriage to Eleanor, daughter of Simon de Montfort the Elder. Llywelyn was also suspected of planting a Montfortian spy, Nicholas Waltham, at Edward's court, and intriguing with Eleanor's brothers, Simon the Younger and Guy.

In November 1276, Edward declared war. Initial operations were under the captaincy of Mortimer, Edward's brother Edmund, Earl of Lancaster, and William de Beauchamp, 9th Earl of Warwick. (Note: Lancaster's post was held by Payne de Chaworth until April.) Support for Llywelyn was weak among his countrymen. In July 1277 Edward invaded with a force of 15,500, of whom 9,000 were Welsh. The campaign never came to a major battle, and Llywelyn realised he had no choice but to surrender. By the Treaty of Aberconwy in November 1277, he was left only with the land of Gwynedd, though he was allowed to retain the title of Prince of Wales.

War broke out again in 1282. The Welsh saw the war as being over national identity and the right to traditional Welsh law. This enjoyed wide support, provoked by attempts to abuse the English legal system to dispossess prominent Welsh landowners, many of whom were Edward's former opponents. For Edward, it became a war of conquest aimed to "put an end finally to ... the malice of the Welsh". The war started with a rebellion by Dafydd, who was discontented with the reward he had received in 1277. Llywelyn and other Welsh leaders soon joined in, and initially the Welsh attack was successful. In June, Gloucester was defeated at the Battle of Llandeilo Fawr. On 6 November, while John Peckham, Archbishop of Canterbury, was conducting peace negotiations, Edward's commander of Anglesey, Luke de Tany, carried out a surprise attack. A pontoon bridge had been built to the mainland, but shortly after Tany and his men crossed over, they were ambushed by the Welsh and suffered heavy losses at the Battle of Moel-y-don. The Welsh advances ended on 11 December, when Llywelyn was lured into a trap and killed at the Battle of Orewin Bridge. The conquest of Gwynedd was complete with the capture in June 1283 of Dafydd, who was taken to Shrewsbury and executed as a traitor the following year; Edward ordered Dafydd's head to be publicly exhibited on London Bridge.

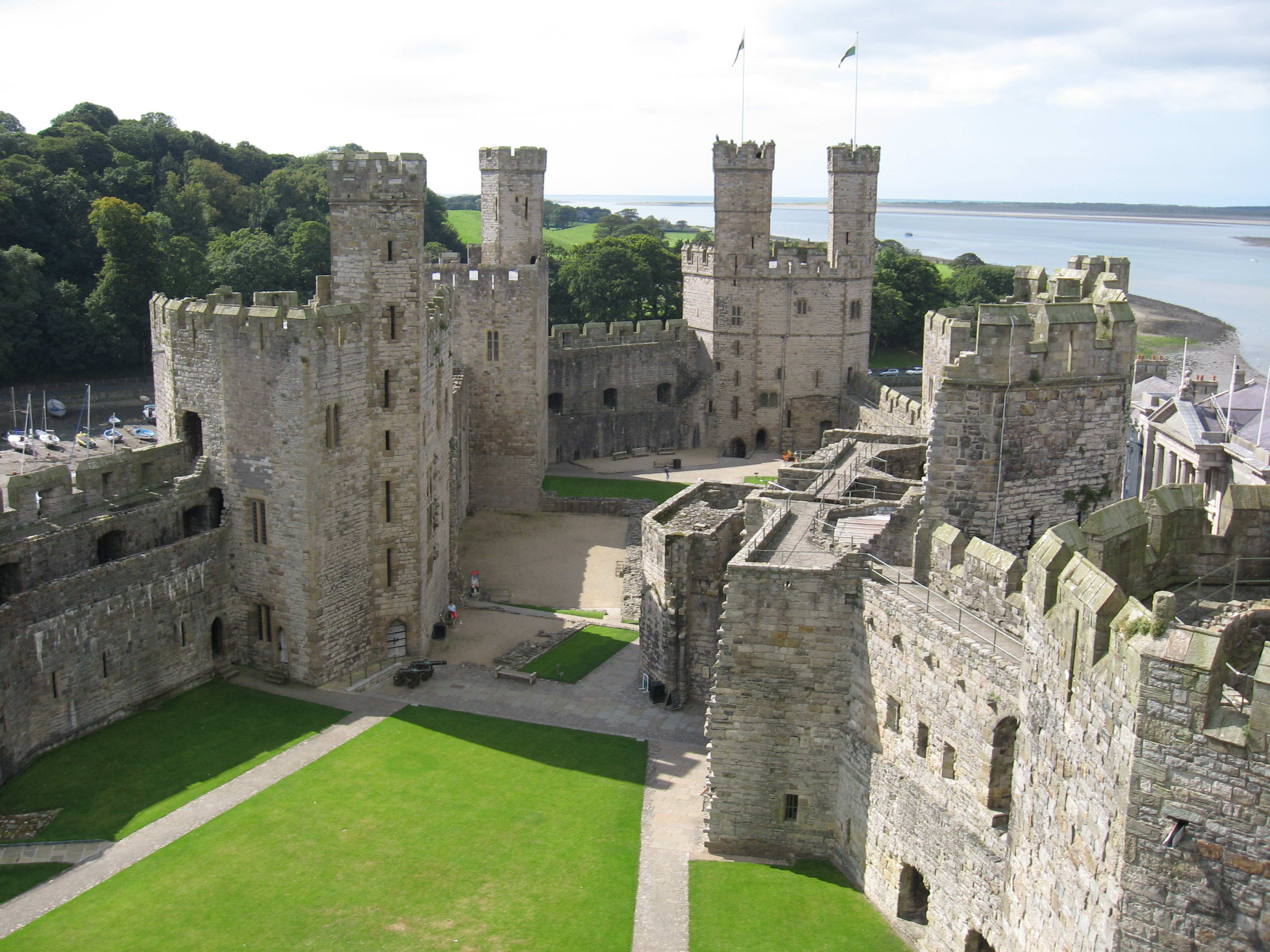
Caernarfon Castle, one of the castles erected in Wales during the reign of Edward I

By the 1284 Statute of Rhuddlan, the principality of Wales was incorporated into England and was given an administrative system like the English, with counties policed by sheriffs. English law was introduced in criminal cases; the Welsh were allowed to maintain their own customary laws in some cases of property disputes. After 1277, and increasingly after 1283, Edward embarked on a project of English settlement of Wales, creating new towns like Flint, Aberystwyth and Rhuddlan. Their new residents were English migrants, the local Welsh being banned from living there, and many were protected by extensive walls. (Note: Clauses in the town charters were also included stating that "Jews shall not sojourn in the borough at any time", both before and after the expulsion of the Jews in 1290.)

An extensive project of castle building was also initiated, under the direction of James of Saint George, a prestigious architect Edward had met in Savoy on his return from the crusade. These included Beaumaris, Caernarfon, Conwy and Harlech castles, intended to act as fortresses, royal palaces and as the new centres of civilian and judicial administration. His programme of castle building in Wales heralded the widespread introduction of arrowslits in castle walls across Europe, drawing on Eastern architectural influences. Also a product of the Crusades was the introduction of the concentric castle, and four of the eight castles Edward founded in Wales followed this design. The castles drew on imagery associated with the Byzantine Empire and King Arthur in an attempt to build legitimacy for his new rule, and they made a clear statement about Edward's intention to rule Wales permanently. The Welsh aristocracy were nearly wholly dispossessed of their lands. Edward was the greatest beneficiary of this process. Localised rebellions occurred in 1287–88, partly caused by Edward failing to reward former Welsh allies. A more serious revolt came in 1294, under the leadership of Madog ap Llywelyn, a distant relative of Llywelyn ap Gruffudd. The causes of the 1294 revolt included resentment at the occupation, poor, colonial-style governance, and very heavy taxation. This last conflict demanded the King's attention, but in both cases the rebellions were put down. The revolt was followed by immediate punitive measures including taking 200 hostages. Measures to stop the Welsh from bearing arms or living in the new boroughs probably date from this time, and the Welsh administration continued to be nearly wholly imported.

In 1284, King Edward had his son Edward (later Edward II) born at Caernarfon Castle, probably to make a statement about the new political order in Wales. (Note: David Powel, a 16th-century clergyman, suggested that the baby was offered to the Welsh as a prince "that was borne in Wales and could speake never a word of English", but there is no evidence to support this widely reported account.) In 1301 at Lincoln, the young Edward became the first English prince to be invested as Prince of Wales, when the King granted him the Earldom of Chester and lands across North Wales, hoping to give his son more financial independence. (Note: This title became the traditional title of the heir apparent to the English throne. Prince Edward was not born heir apparent, but became so when his older brother Alphonso, Earl of Chester, died in 1284.) Edward began a more conciliatory policy to rebuild systems of patronage and service, particularly through his son as Prince of Wales, but Wales remained politically volatile, and a deep distrust remained between the English settlers and the Welsh.

=== Diplomacy and war on the Continent ===
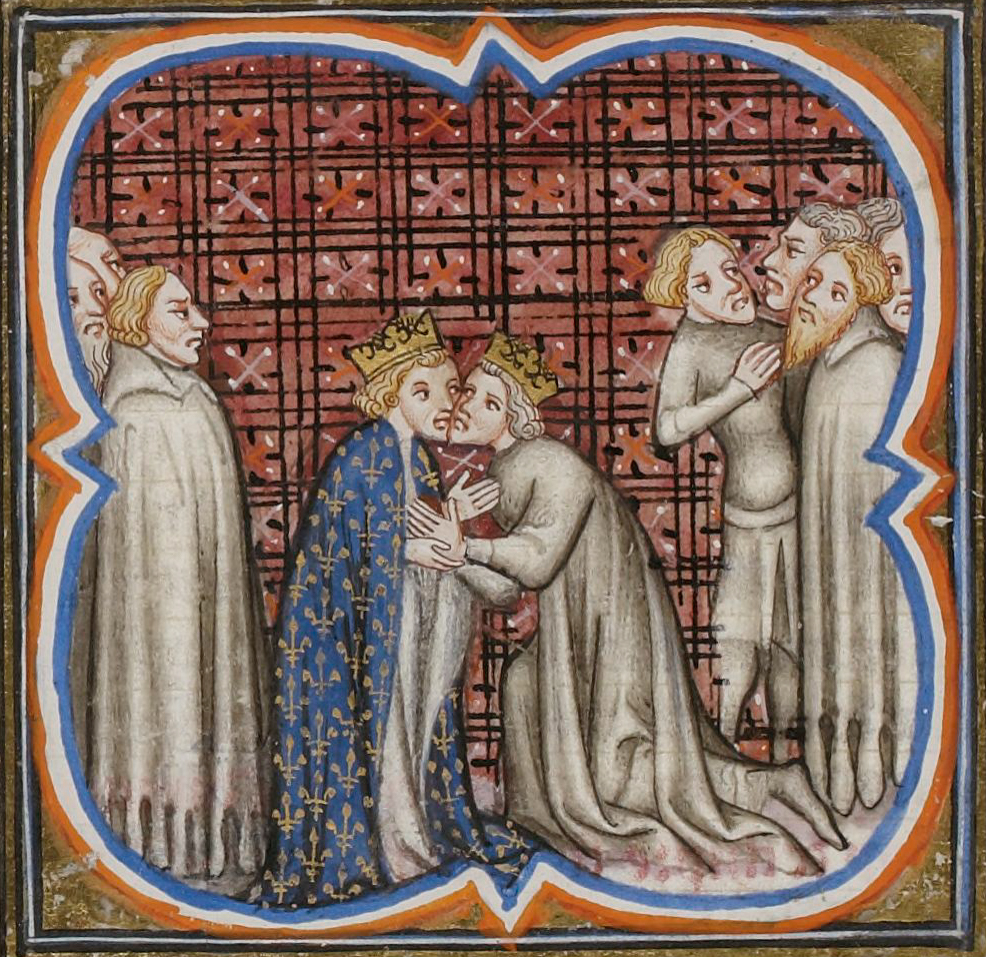
Edward I (right) giving homage to Philip IV of France (left). As Duke of Aquitaine, Edward was a vassal of the French king.

Edward never again went on crusade after his return to England in 1274, but he maintained an intention to do so, and in 1287 took a vow to go on another crusade. This intention guided much of his foreign policy, until at least 1291. To stage a European-wide crusade, it was essential to prevent conflict between the sovereigns on Continental Europe. A major obstacle to this was the conflict between the French Capetian House of Anjou ruling southern Italy and the Crown of Aragon in Spain. In 1282, the citizens of Palermo rose up against Charles of Anjou and turned for help to Peter III of Aragon, in what has become known as the Sicilian Vespers. In the war that followed, Charles of Anjou's son, Charles of Salerno, was taken prisoner by the Aragonese. The French began planning an attack on Aragon, raising the prospect of a large-scale European war. To Edward, it was imperative that such a war be avoided, and in Paris in 1286 he brokered a truce between France and Aragon that helped secure Charles's release. As far as the crusades were concerned, Edward's efforts proved ineffective. A devastating blow to his plans came in 1291, when the Mamluks captured Acre, the last Christian stronghold in the Holy Land.

Edward had long been deeply involved in the affairs of his own Duchy of Gascony. In 1278 he assigned an investigating commission to his trusted associates Otto de Grandson and the chancellor Robert Burnell, which caused the replacement of the seneschal Luke de Tany. In 1286, Edward visited the region and stayed for almost three years. On Easter Sunday 1287, Edward was standing in a tower when the floor collapsed. He fell 80 feet, broke his collarbone, and was confined to bed for several months. Several others died. Soon after he regained his health, he ordered the local Jews expelled from Gascony, seemingly as a "thank-offering" for his recovery. (Note: It has generally been assumed the expulsion was an attempt to raise capital to secure Charles's release. However, Edward donated what income was made from property seizures to mendicant orders.)

The perennial problem was the status of Gascony within the Kingdom of France, and Edward's role as the French king's vassal. On his diplomatic mission in 1286, Edward had paid homage to the new king, Philip IV. Following an outbreak of piracy and informal war between English, Gascon, Norman, and French sailors in 1293, his brother Edmund Crouchback allowed Philip IV to occupy Gascony's chief fortresses as a show of good faith that Edward had not intended the seizure of several French ships or the sacking of the French port of La Rochelle. Philip refused to release the fortresses, and declared Gascony forfeit when Edward refused to appear before him again in Paris.

Correspondence between Edward and the Mongol court of the east continued during this time. Diplomatic channels between the two had begun during Edward's time on crusade, regarding a possible alliance to retake the Holy Land for Europe. Edward received Mongol envoys at his court in Gascony while there in 1287, and one of their leaders, Rabban Bar Sauma (a Uyghur Turk from Yuan China), recorded an extant account of the interaction. Other embassies arrived in Europe in 1289 and 1290, the former relaying Ilkhan Abaqa's offer to join forces with the crusaders and supply them with horses. Edward responded favourably, declaring his intent to travel to the east once he obtained papal approval. This did not materialise, but the King's decision to send Geoffrey of Langley as his ambassador to the Mongols showed that he was seriously considering the prospective Mongol alliance.

Eleanor of Castile died on 28 November 1290. The couple loved each other, and like his father, Edward was very devoted to his wife and was faithful to her throughout their marriage. He was deeply affected by her death, and displayed his grief by ordering the construction of twelve so-called Eleanor crosses, one at each place where her funeral cortège stopped for the night.

In 1294 a war at sea flared up between English and Norman privateers. Philip the Fair exploited the conflict to confiscate Gascony, provoking Edward to renounce his homage and declare war. After the initial fighting in Gascony, both kings sought to widen the conflict by forging expensive alliances. Edward joined forces with Adolf of Nassau (the King of Germany), the Count of Flanders and the barons of Franche-Comté in eastern Burgundy. Other members of the alliance included two of his sons-in-law, the Duke of Brabant and the Count of Bar-le-Duc. Edward's strategy was to attack the French on all fronts and stretch their forces to their breaking point. Most of his allies did indeed go into action and caused considerable damage in Champagne, Burgundy, Gascony and the Toulousaine. However, the King of Germany failed to join Edward in Flanders, obliging the allies to seek a truce in October 1297. Edward renewed his military contract with the Burgundians in March 1298, prolonging the war in Franche-Comté. This may have been an effort to distract Philip and prevent him from aiding the Scots. The war was effectively frozen by the Treaties of Montreuil in 1299, whereby Edward agreed to marry Philip's sister Margaret. As part of her dowry Philip returned the county of Ponthieu, which had been seized along with Gascony in 1294. This restored Edward's position as a vassal of the French king, although Gascony was not formally returned until the 1303 Treaty of Paris.

=== Great Cause ===
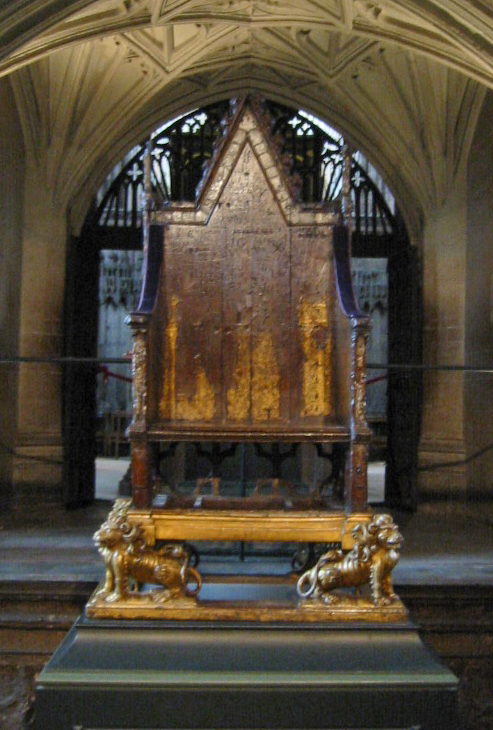
The Coronation Chair in Westminster Abbey was commissioned by Edward in 1296 to house the Stone of Scone and has been used for coronations for over 700 years.

The relationship between England and Scotland by the 1280s was one of relatively harmonious coexistence. The issue of homage did not reach the same level of controversy as it did in Wales; in 1278 King Alexander III of Scotland paid homage to Edward, who was his brother-in-law, but apparently only for the lands he held in England. Problems arose only with the Scottish succession crisis of the early 1290s. When Alexander died in 1286, he left as heir to the Scottish throne Margaret, his three-year-old granddaughter and sole surviving descendant. By the Treaty of Birgham, it was agreed that Margaret should marry King Edward's six-year-old son Edward of Caernarfon, though Scotland would remain free of English overlordship. Margaret, by now seven, sailed from Norway for Scotland in late 1290, but fell ill on the way and died in Orkney. This left the country without an obvious heir, and led to the succession dispute known as the Great Cause. (Note: The term is an 18th-century invention.)

Fourteen claimants put forward their claims to the title, of whom the foremost competitors were John Balliol and Robert de Brus, 5th Lord of Annandale. The Scottish magnates made a request to Edward to conduct the proceedings and administer the outcome, but not to arbitrate in the dispute. The actual decision would be made by 104 auditors – 40 appointed by Balliol, 40 by Brus and the remaining 24 selected by Edward from senior members of the Scottish political community. At Birgham, with the prospect of a personal union between the two realms, the question of suzerainty had not been of great importance to Edward. Now he insisted that, if he were to settle the contest, he had to be fully recognised as Scotland's feudal overlord. The Scots were reluctant to make such a concession, and replied that since the country had no king, no one had the authority to make this decision. This problem was circumvented when the competitors agreed that the realm would be handed over to Edward until a rightful heir had been found. After a lengthy hearing, a decision was made in favour of John Balliol on 17 November 1292. (Note: Even though the principle of primogeniture did not necessarily apply to descent through female heirs, there is little doubt that Balliol's claim was the strongest one.)

Even after Balliol's accession, Edward still asserted his authority over Scotland. Against the objections of the Scots, he agreed to hear appeals on cases ruled on by the court of guardians that had governed Scotland during the interregnum. A further provocation came in a case brought by Macduff, son of Malcolm II, Earl of Fife, in which Edward demanded that Balliol appear in person before the English Parliament to answer the charges. This the Scottish King did, but the final straw was Edward's demand that the Scottish magnates provide military service in the war against France. This was unacceptable; the Scots instead formed an alliance with France and launched an unsuccessful attack on Carlisle. Edward responded by invading Scotland in 1296 and taking the town of Berwick-upon-Tweed which included the massacre of civilians. At the Battle of Dunbar, Scottish resistance was effectively crushed. Edward took the Stone of Destiny – the Scottish coronation stone – and brought it to Westminster, placing it in what became known as King Edward's Chair; he deposed Balliol and placed him in the Tower of London, and installed Englishmen to govern the country. The campaign had been very successful, but the English triumph would be only temporary.

== Government and law ==
=== Character as king ===
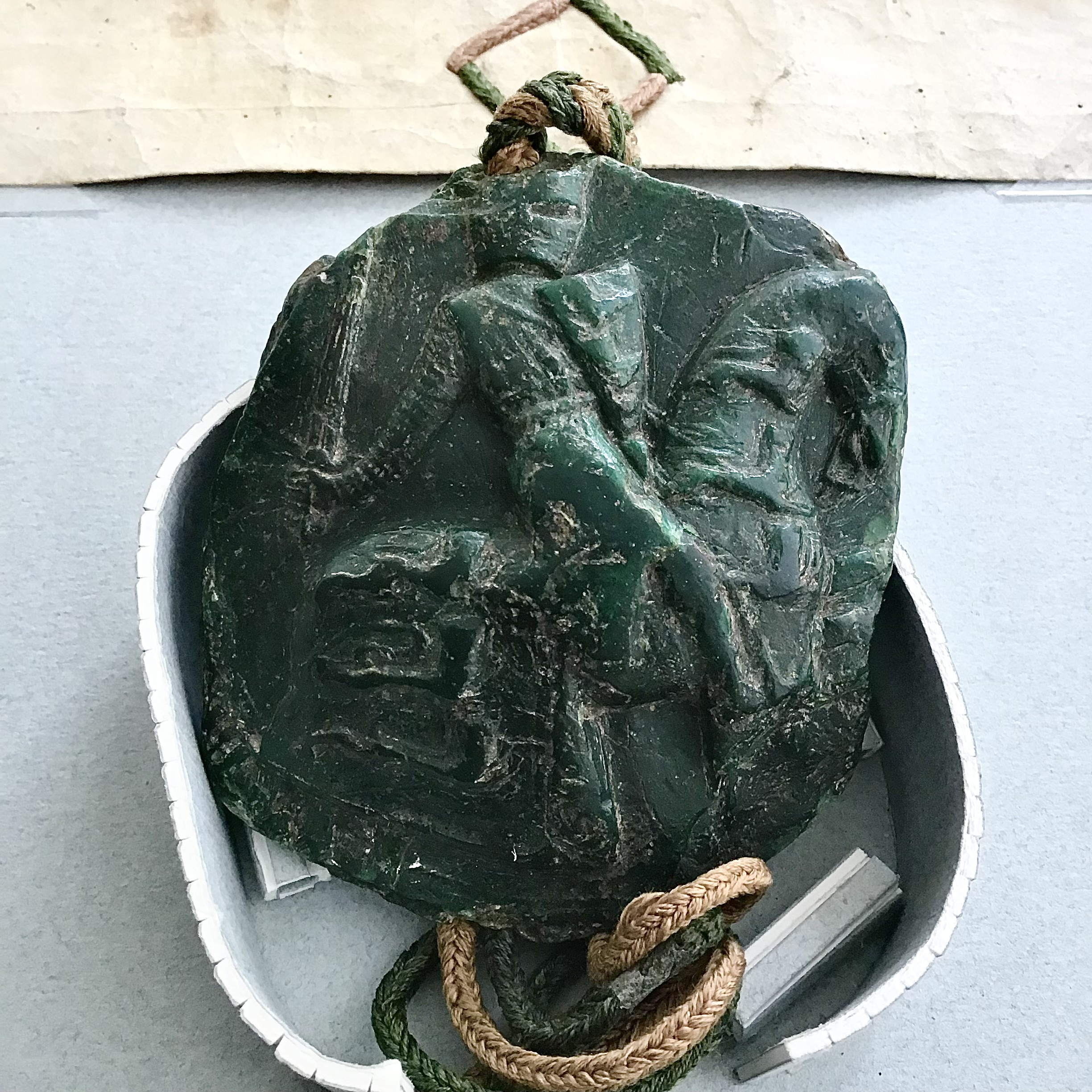
A 1290 seal of Edward I

Edward had a reputation for a fierce and sometimes unpredictable temper, and he could be intimidating; one story tells how the Dean of St Paul's, wishing to confront Edward over high taxation in 1295, fell down and died once he was in the King's presence, and one 14th-century chronicler attributed the death of Archbishop Thomas of York to the King's harsh conduct towards him. When Edward of Caernarfon demanded an earldom for his favourite Piers Gaveston, the King erupted in anger and supposedly tore out handfuls of his son's hair. Some of his contemporaries considered Edward frightening, particularly in his early days. The Song of Lewes in 1264 described him as a leopard, an animal regarded as particularly powerful and unpredictable. At times, Edward exhibited a gentler disposition, and was known to be devoted to his large family. He was close to his daughters, and gave them expensive gifts when they visited court.

Despite his harsh disposition, Edward's English contemporaries considered him an able, even an ideal, king. Though not loved by his subjects, he was feared and respected, as reflected in the lack of armed rebellions in England during his reign. Edward is often noted as exhibiting vindictiveness towards his defeated enemies, and triumphalism in his actions. Historian R. R. Davies considered Edward's repeated and "gratuitous belittling of his opponents", to have been "one of the most consistent and unattractive features of his character as king". Examples include the seizure of fragments of the Holy Cross from Wales after its defeat in 1283, and subsequently the Stone of Scone and regalia from Scotland after defeats in 1296. Some historians question Edward's good faith and trustworthiness in relation to his dealing with Wales and Scotland, believing him to have been capable of behaving duplicitously.

Historian Michael Prestwich believes Edward met contemporary expectations of kingship in his role as an able, determined soldier and in his embodiment of shared chivalric ideals. In religious observance he fulfilled the expectations of his age: he attended chapel regularly, gave alms generously and showed a fervent devotion to the Virgin Mary and Saint Thomas Becket. Like his father, Edward was a keen participant in the tradition of the royal touch, which was believed to cure those who were touched from scrofula. Contemporary records suggest that the King touched upwards of a thousand people each year. Despite his personal piety, Edward was frequently in conflict with the Archbishops of Canterbury who served during his reign. Relations with the Papacy were at times no better, Edward coming into conflict with Rome over the issue of ecclesiastical taxation. Edward's use of the church extended to war mobilisation including disseminating justifications for war, usually through the issue of writs to England's archbishops, who distributed his requests for services and prayers. Edward's architectural programme similarly had an element of propaganda, sometimes combining this with religious messages of piety, as with the Eleanor Crosses.

Edward took a keen interest in the stories of King Arthur, which were popular in Europe during his reign. In 1278 he visited Glastonbury Abbey to open what was then believed to be the tomb of Arthur and Guinevere, and gained "Arthur's crown" from Llywelyn after the conquest of North Wales; his castle-building campaign in Wales drew upon the Arthurian myths in their design and location. He held "Round Table" events in 1284 and 1302, involving tournaments and feasting, and chroniclers compared him and the events at his court to Arthur. In some cases Edward appears to have used the Arthurian myths to serve his own political interests, including legitimising his rule in Wales and discrediting the Welsh belief that Arthur might return as their political saviour.

=== Administration and the law ===
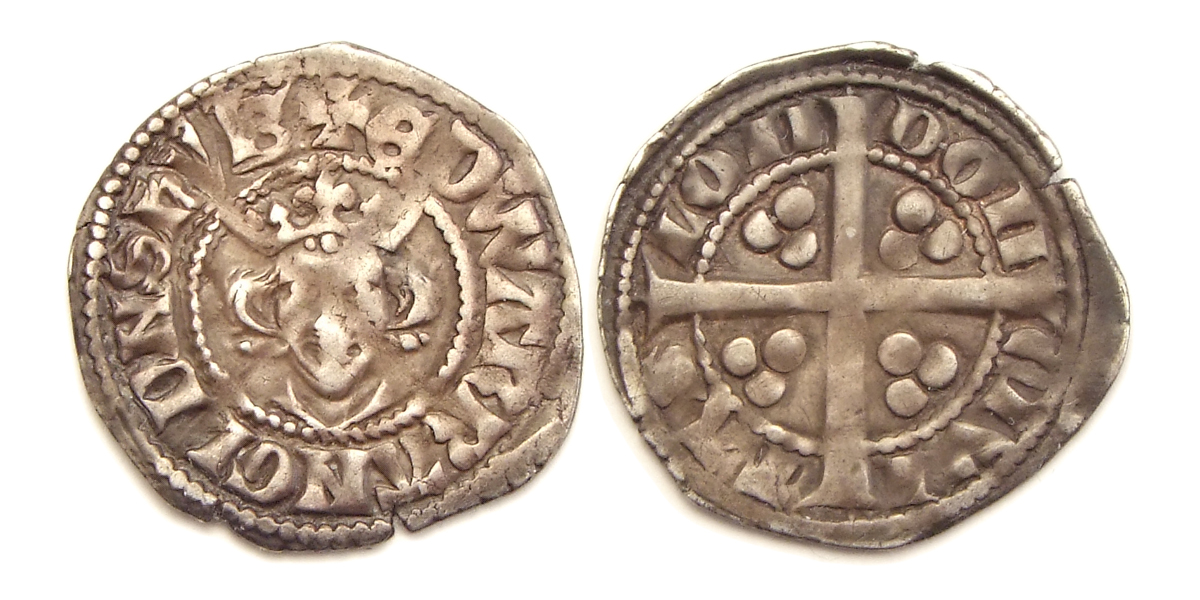
Long cross penny with portrait of Edward, struck in London

Soon after assuming the throne, Edward set about restoring order and re-establishing royal authority after the troubled reign of his father. To accomplish this, he immediately ordered an extensive change of administrative personnel. The most important of these was the designation of Robert Burnell as chancellor in 1274, a man who would remain in the post until 1292 as one of the King's closest associates. The same year as Burnell's appointment, Edward replaced most local officials, such as the escheators and sheriffs. This last measure was taken in preparation for an extensive inquest covering all of England, that would hear complaints about abuse of power by royal officers. The second purpose of the inquest was to establish what land and rights the Crown had lost during the reign of Henry III.

The inquest produced a set of census documents called the Hundred Rolls. These have been likened to the 11th-century Domesday Book, and they formed the basis for the later legal inquiries called the Quo warranto proceedings. The purpose of these inquiries was to establish by what warrant (Latin: Quo warranto) liberties were held. (Note: Among those singled out in particular by the royal justices was Gilbert de Clare, 6th Earl of Hertford, who was seen to have encroached ruthlessly on royal rights over the preceding years.) If the defendant could not produce a royal licence to prove the grant of the liberty, then it was the Crown's opinion – based on the writings of the influential 13th-century legal scholar Henry de Bracton – that the liberty should revert to the King. Both the Statute of Westminster 1275 and Statute of Westminster 1285 codified the existing law in England. By enacting the Statute of Gloucester in 1278 the King challenged baronial rights through a revival of the system of general eyres (royal justices to go on tour throughout the land) and through a significant increase in the number of pleas of quo warranto to be heard by such eyres.

This caused great consternation among the aristocracy, who insisted that long use in itself constituted licence. A compromise was eventually reached in 1290, whereby a liberty was considered legitimate as long as it could be shown to have been exercised since the coronation of Richard the Lionheart in 1189. Royal gains from the Quo warranto proceedings were insignificant as few liberties were returned to the King, but he had nevertheless won a significant victory by establishing the principle that all liberties emanated from the Crown.

The 1290 statute of Quo warranto was only one part of a wider legislative reform, which was one of the most important contributions of Edward's reign. This era of legislative action had started already at the time of the baronial reform movement; the Statute of Marlborough (1267) contained elements both of the Provisions of Oxford and the Dictum of Kenilworth. The compilation of the Hundred Rolls was followed shortly after by the issue of Westminster I (1275), which asserted the royal prerogative and outlined restrictions on liberties. The Statutes of Mortmain (1279) addressed the issue of land grants to the Church. The first clause of Westminster II (1285), known as De donis conditionalibus, dealt with family settlement of land, and entails. The Statute of Merchants (1285) established firm rules for the recovery of debts, and the Statute of Winchester (1285) dealt with security and peacekeeping on a local level by bolstering the existing police system. Quia emptores (1290) – issued along with Quo warranto – set out to remedy land ownership disputes resulting from alienation of land by subinfeudation. The age of the great statutes largely ended with the death of Robert Burnell in 1292.

=== Finances and Parliament ===
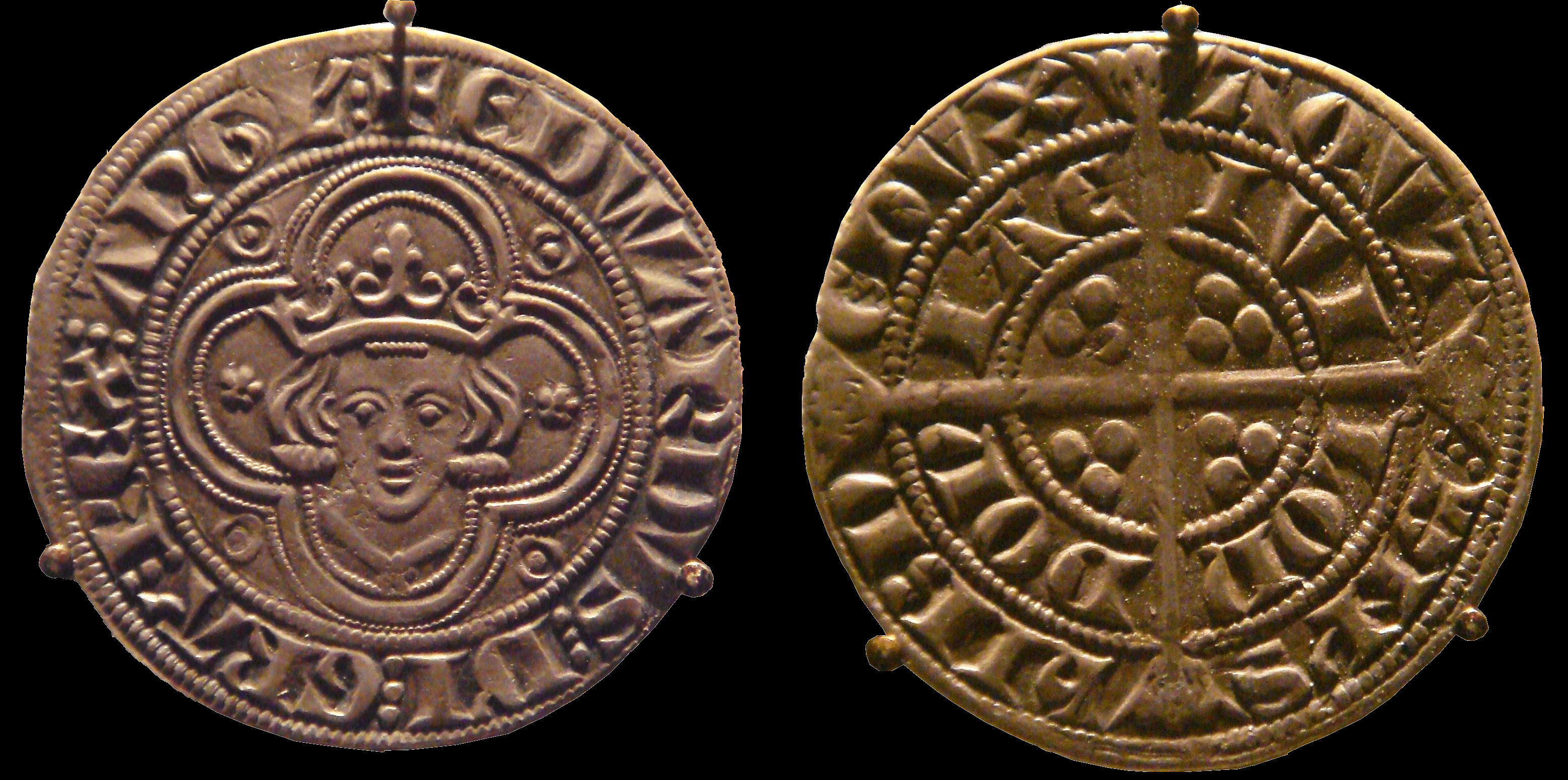
Two groats of Edward I (4 pence coins). On the left the obverse shows a head with a coronet. The surrounding text says, in abbreviated Latin, "Edward, by the grace of God king of England". The reverse shows a cross and the text "Duke of Aquitaine and Lord of Ireland", and "Made in London".

Edward's reign saw an overhaul of the coinage system, which was in a poor state by 1279. Compared to the coinage already circulating at the time of Edward's accession, the new coins issued proved to be of superior quality. In addition to minting pennies, halfpences and farthings, a new denomination called the groat (which proved to be unsuccessful) was introduced. The coinmaking process itself was also improved. The moneyer William Turnemire introduced a novel method of minting coins that involved cutting blank coins from a silver rod, in contrast with the old practice of stamping them out from sheets; this technique proved to be efficient. The practice of minting coins with the moneyer's name on them became obsolete under Edward's rule because England's mint administration became far more centralised under the Crown's authority. During this time, English coins were frequently counterfeited on the Continent, especially the Low Countries, and despite a ban in 1283, English coinage was secretly exported to the European continent. In August 1280, Edward forbade the usage of the old long cross coinage, which forced the populace to switch to the newly minted versions. Records indicate that the coinage overhaul successfully provided England with a stable currency.

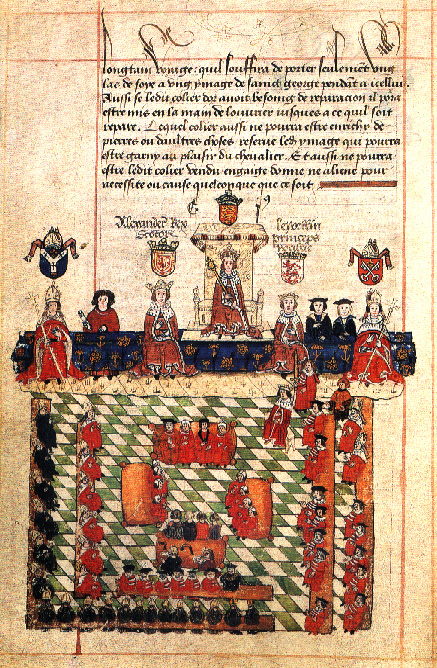
16th-century illustration of Edward I presiding over Parliament. The scene shows Alexander III of Scotland and Llywelyn ap Gruffudd of Wales on either side of Edward, an episode that never occurred.

Edward's frequent military campaigns put a great financial strain on the nation. There were several ways through which the King could raise money for war, including customs duties, loans and lay subsidies, which were taxes collected at a certain fraction of the moveable property of all laymen who held such assets. In 1275, Edward negotiated an agreement with the domestic merchant community that secured a permanent duty on wool, England's primary export. In 1303, a similar agreement was reached with foreign merchants, in return for certain rights and privileges. The revenues from the customs duty were handled by the Riccardi, a group of bankers from Lucca in Italy. This was in return for their service as moneylenders to the crown, which helped finance the Welsh Wars. When the war with France broke out, the French king confiscated the Riccardi's assets, and the bank went bankrupt. After this, the Frescobaldi of Florence took over the role as moneylenders to the English crown. Edward also sought to reduce pressure on his finances by helping his wife Eleanor to build an independent income.

Edward held Parliament on a regular basis throughout his reign. In 1295, a significant change occurred. For this Parliament, as well as the secular and ecclesiastical lords, two knights from each county and two representatives from each borough were summoned. The representation of commons in Parliament was nothing new; what was new was the authority under which these representatives were summoned. Whereas previously the commons had been expected to assent to decisions made by the magnates, it was now proclaimed that they should meet with the full authority (plena potestas) of their communities, to give assent to decisions made in Parliament. The King now had full backing for collecting lay subsidies from the entire population. Whereas Henry III had only collected four of these in his reign, Edward collected nine. This format eventually became the standard for later Parliaments, and historians have named the assembly the "Model Parliament", a term first introduced by the English historian William Stubbs.

=== Parliament and the expulsion of the Jews ===
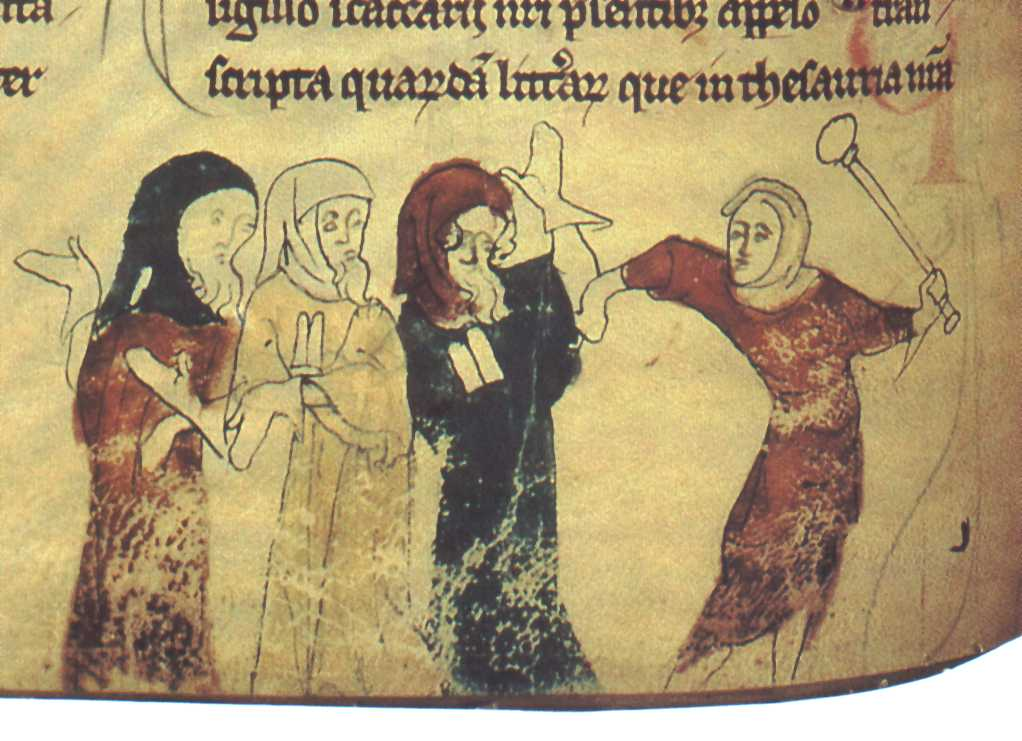
A contemporary illustration showing the expulsion of the Jews. Image shows the white double tabula that Jews in England were mandated to wear by law.

Edward's policy towards the English Jews dominated his financial relations with Parliament until 1290. Jews, unlike Christians, were allowed to charge interest on loans, known as usury. Edward faced pressure from the church, who were increasingly intolerant of Judaism and usury. The Jews were the King's personal property, and he was free to tax them at will. Over-taxation of the Jews forced them to sell their debt bonds at cut prices, which was exploited by the crown to transfer vast land wealth from indebted landholders to courtiers and his wife, Eleanor of Provence, causing widespread resentment. In 1275, facing discontent in Parliament, Edward issued the Statute of the Jewry, which outlawed loans with interest and encouraged the Jews to take up other professions. In 1279, using a crack-down on coin-clippers as a pretext, he organised the arrest of all the heads of Jewish households in England. Approximately a tenth of the Jewish population, around 300 people, were executed. Others were allowed to pay fines. At least £16,000 (Note: A value of approximately 1.6m days of work for a skilled tradesman.) was raised through fines and the seizure of property from the dead. (Note: Rokéah's figures make it clear that the vast majority of this windfall came from Jews, but it is not possible to be exact. Christians were also arrested and fined, especially over the longer period, but far fewer were executed.) In 1280, he ordered all Jews to attend special sermons, preached by Dominican friars, with the hope of persuading them to convert, but these exhortations were not followed. By 1280, the Jews had been exploited to a level at which they were no longer of much financial use to the crown, but they could still be used in political bargaining.

With the Edict of Expulsion in 1290, Edward formally expelled all Jews from England. (Note: The date for the Edict of Expulsion, 18 July 1290, was the fast of the ninth of Ab, commemorating the fall of the Temple at Jerusalem and other disasters experienced by the Jewish people; it is unlikely to be a coincidence. The date by which the Jews had to leave was set as 1 November, All Saints' Day.) As they crossed the Channel to France, some became victims to piracy, and many more were dispossessed or died in the October storms. The Crown disposed of their property through sales and 85 grants made to courtiers and family. (Note: For example, Eleanor of Castile gave the Canterbury synagogue to her tailor.) The Edict appears to have been issued as part of a deal to secure a lay subsidy of £110,000 from Parliament, (Note: A value of about 11 million days' work for a skilled tradesman.) the largest granted in the medieval period. Although expulsions had taken place on a local, temporary basis, (Note: For example, Philip II of France, John I, Duke of Brittany and Louis IX of France, had temporarily expelled Jews.) the English expulsion was unprecedented because it was permanent. It was eventually reversed in the 1650s. Edward claimed the Expulsion was done "in honour of the Crucified" and blamed the Jews for their treachery and criminality. He helped pay for the renovation of the tomb of Little Saint Hugh, a child falsely claimed to have been ritually crucified by Jews, in the same style as the Eleanor crosses, to take political credit for his actions. As historian Richard Stacey notes, "a more explicit identification of the crown with the ritual crucifixion charge can hardly be imagined." (Note: The tomb featured the Royal Crest. The association with the Eleanor crosses is likely to have been an attempt by Edward to associate her memory with opposition to the alleged criminality of the Jews, given her unpopular property dealings which had featured acquisition of lands through purchase of Jewish bonds.)

=== Administration in Ireland ===
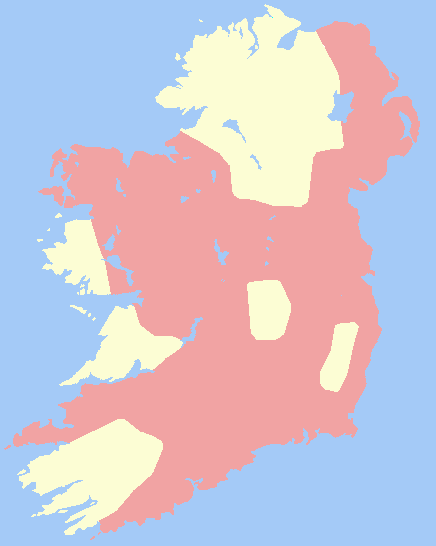
Lordship of Ireland (pink) and Gaelic controlled areas (yellow), 1300

Edward's primary interest in Ireland was as a source of resources, soldiers and funds for his wars, in Gascony, Wales, Scotland and Flanders. Royal interventions aimed to maximise economic extraction. Corruption among Edward's officials was at a high level, and despite Edward's efforts after 1272 to reform the Irish administration, record keeping was poor.

Disturbances in Ireland increased during the period. The weakness and lack of direction given to the Lordship's rule allowed factional fighting to grow, reinforced by the introduction of indentured military service by Irish magnates from around 1290. The funnelling of revenue to Edward's wars left Irish castles, bridges and roads in disrepair, and alongside the withdrawal of troops to be used against Wales and Scotland and elsewhere, helped induce lawless behaviour. Resistance to 'purveyances', or forced purchase of supplies such as grain, added to lawlessness, and caused speculation and inflation in the price of basic goods. Pardons were granted to lawbreakers for service for the King in England. Revenues and removal of troops for Edward's wars left the country unable to address its basic needs, while the administration was wholly focused on providing for Edward's war demands; troops looted and fought with townspeople when on the move. Gaelic Ireland enjoyed a revival, due to the absence of English magnates and the weakness of the Lordship, assimilating some of the settlers. Edward's government was hostile to the use of Gaelic law, which it condemned in 1277 as "displeasing to God and to reason". Conflict was firmly entrenched by the time of the 1297 Irish Parliament, which attempted to create measures to counter disorder and the spread of Gaelic customs and law, while the results of the distress included many abandoned lands and villages.

== Later reign, 1297–1307 ==
=== Constitutional crisis ===
The incessant warfare of the 1290s put a great financial demand on Edward's subjects. Whereas the King had levied only three lay subsidies until 1294, four such taxes were granted in the years 1294–1297, raising over £200,000. (Note: £141m at 2017 prices, or 20 million days' labour for a skilled tradesman.) Along with this came the burden of prises, seizure of wool and hides, and the unpopular additional duty on wool, dubbed the maltolt ("unjustly taken"). The fiscal demands on the King's subjects caused resentment, which eventually led to serious political opposition. The initial resistance was caused not by the lay taxes, but by clerical subsidies. In 1294, Edward made a demand of a grant of one-half of all clerical revenues. There was some resistance, but the King responded by threatening opponents with outlawry, and the grant was eventually made. At the time, Robert Winchelsey, the designated Archbishop of Canterbury, was in Italy to receive consecration. (Note: Winchelsey's consecration was held up by the protracted 1292–1294 papal election.) Winchelsey returned in January 1295 and had to consent to another grant that November. In 1296, his position changed when he received the papal bull Clericis laicos. This prohibited the clergy from paying taxes to lay authorities without explicit consent from the Pope. When the clergy, with reference to the bull, refused to pay, Edward responded with outlawry. Winchelsey was presented with a dilemma between loyalty to the King and upholding the papal bull, and he responded by leaving it to every individual clergyman to pay as he saw fit. By the end of the year, a solution was offered by the new papal bull Etsi de statu, which allowed clerical taxation in cases of pressing urgency. This allowed Edward to collect considerable sums by taxing the English clergy.

Edward
By God, Sir Earl, either go or hang
Roger Bigod
By that same oath, O king, I shall neither go nor hang

— Chronicle of Walter of Guisborough

Opposition from the laity took longer to surface. This resistance focused on the King's right to demand military service and his right to levy taxes. At the Salisbury Parliament of February 1297, the Earl Marshal Roger Bigod, 5th Earl of Norfolk, objected to a royal summons of military service. Bigod argued that the military obligation only extended to service alongside the King; if the King intended to sail to Flanders, he could not send his subjects to Gascony. In July, Bigod and Humphrey de Bohun, 3rd Earl of Hereford and Constable of England, drew up a series of complaints known as the Remonstrances, in which objections to the high level of taxation were voiced. Undeterred, Edward requested another lay subsidy. This one was particularly provocative, because the King had sought consent from only a small group of magnates, rather than from representatives of the communities in Parliament. While Edward was in Winchelsea, preparing for the campaign in Flanders, Bigod and de Bohun arrived at the Exchequer to prevent the collection of the tax. As the King left the country with a greatly reduced force, the kingdom seemed to be on the verge of civil war. The English defeat by the Scots at the Battle of Stirling Bridge resolved the situation. The renewed threat to the homeland gave king and magnates common cause. Edward signed the Confirmatio cartarum – a confirmation of Magna Carta and its accompanying Charter of the Forest – and the nobility agreed to serve with the King on a campaign in Scotland.

Edward's problems with the opposition did not end with the Scottish campaign. Over the following years he would be held to the promises he had made, in particular that of upholding the Charter of the Forest. In the Parliament of 1301, the King was forced to order an assessment of the royal forests, but in 1305 he obtained a papal bull that freed him from this concession. Ultimately, it was a change in personnel that spelt the end of the opposition against Edward. De Bohun died late in 1298, after returning from the Scottish campaign. In 1302 Bigod arrived at an agreement with the King that was beneficial for both: Bigod, who had no children, made Edward his heir, in return for a generous annual grant. Edward got his revenge on Winchelsey, who had been opposed to the King's policy of clerical taxation, in 1305, when Clement V was elected pope. Clement was a Gascon sympathetic to the King, and on Edward's instigation had Winchelsey suspended from office.

=== Return to Scotland ===
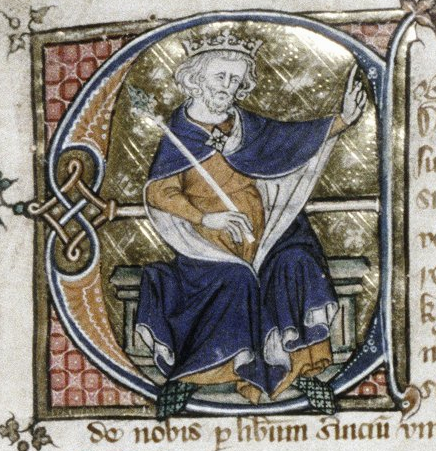
Miniature depiction of Edward I dating from the reign of his son Edward II

Edward believed that he had completed the conquest of Scotland when he left the country in 1296, but resistance soon emerged under the leadership of Andrew de Moray in the north and William Wallace in the south. On 11 September 1297, a large English force under the leadership of John de Warenne, 6th Earl of Surrey, and Hugh de Cressingham was routed by a much smaller Scottish army led by Wallace and Moray at the Battle of Stirling Bridge. The defeat sent shockwaves into England, and preparations for a retaliatory campaign started immediately. Soon after Edward returned from Flanders, he headed north. On 22 July 1298, in the only major battle he had fought since Evesham in 1265, Edward defeated Wallace's forces at the Battle of Falkirk. Edward was not able to take advantage of the momentum and the next year the Scots recaptured Stirling Castle. Even though Edward campaigned in Scotland in 1300, when he successfully besieged Caerlaverock Castle and in 1301, the Scots refused to engage in open battle again, preferring instead to raid the English countryside in smaller groups.

The Scots appealed to Pope Boniface VIII to assert a papal claim of overlordship to Scotland in place of the English. His papal bull addressed to King Edward in these terms was firmly rejected on Edward's behalf by the Barons' Letter of 1301. The English managed to subdue the country by other means: in 1303, a peace agreement was reached between England and France, effectively breaking up the Franco-Scottish alliance. Robert the Bruce, the grandson of the claimant to the crown in 1291, had sided with the English in the winter of 1301–02. In 1304, most of the other nobles of the country had also pledged their allegiance to Edward, and the English also managed to re-take Stirling Castle. A great propaganda victory was achieved in 1305 when Wallace was betrayed by Sir John de Menteith and turned over to the English, who had him taken to London and publicly executed. With Scotland largely under English control, Edward installed Englishmen and collaborating Scots to govern the country.

The situation changed again on 10 February 1306, when Robert the Bruce murdered his rival John Comyn, and a few weeks later, on 25 March, was crowned King of Scotland. Bruce now embarked on a campaign to restore Scottish independence, and this took the English by surprise. Edward was suffering ill health by this time, and instead of leading an expedition himself, he gave different military commands to Aymer de Valence, 2nd Earl of Pembroke, and Henry Percy, 1st Baron Percy, while the main royal army was led by the Prince of Wales. The English initially met with success; on 19 June, Aymer de Valence routed Bruce at the Battle of Methven. Bruce was forced into hiding, and the English forces recaptured their lost territory and castles.

Edward acted with unusual brutality against Bruce's family, allies, and supporters. His sister, Mary, was imprisoned in a cage at Roxburgh Castle for four years. Isabella MacDuff, Countess of Buchan, who had crowned Bruce, was held in a cage at Berwick Castle. His younger brother Neil was executed by being hanged, drawn, and quartered; he had been captured after he and his garrison held off Edward's forces who had been seeking his wife, daughter and sisters. Edward now regarded the struggle not as a war between two nations, but as the suppression of a rebellion of disloyal subjects. This brutality, rather than helping to subdue the Scots, had the opposite effect, and rallied growing support for Bruce.

=== Death and burial ===
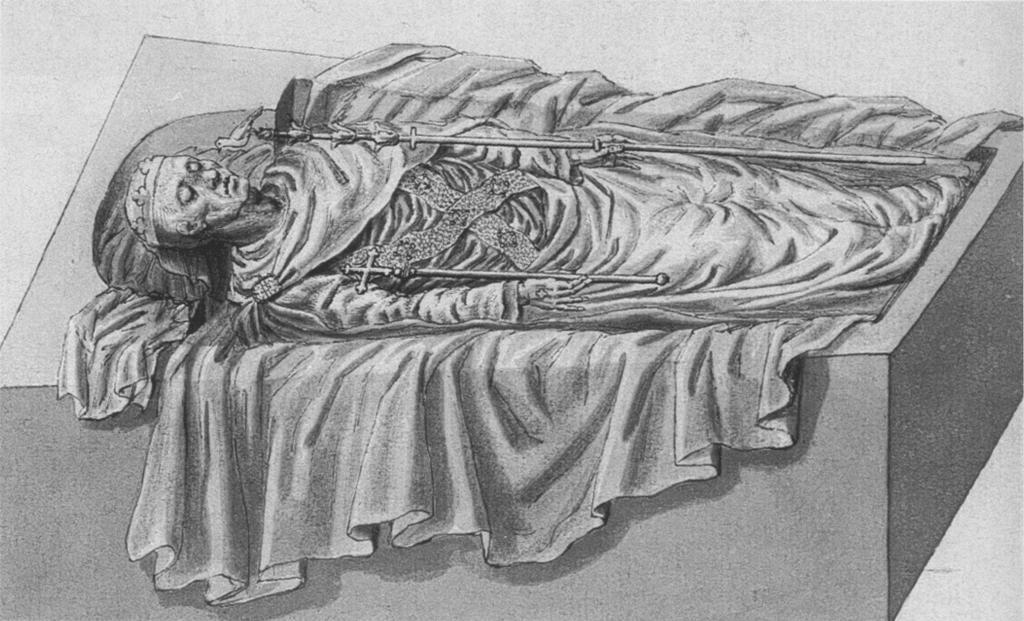
Remains of Edward I, from an illustration made when his tomb was opened in 1774

In February 1307, Bruce resumed his efforts and started gathering men, and in May he defeated Valence at the Battle of Loudoun Hill. Edward, who had rallied somewhat, now moved north himself. He developed dysentery on the way, and his condition deteriorated. On 6 July he encamped at Burgh by Sands, just south of the Scottish border. When his servants came the next morning to lift him up so that he could eat, the King died in their arms.

Several stories emerged about Edward's deathbed wishes; according to one tradition, he requested that his heart be carried to the Holy Land, along with an army to fight the infidels. A more dubious story tells of how he wished for his bones to be carried along on future expeditions against the Scots. Another account of his deathbed scene is more credible; according to one chronicle, Edward gathered around him Henry de Lacy, 3rd Earl of Lincoln; Guy de Beauchamp, 10th Earl of Warwick; Aymer de Valence; and Robert de Clifford, 1st Baron de Clifford, and charged them with looking after his son Edward. In particular they should make sure that Piers Gaveston, whom he had banished earlier that year, was not allowed to return to the country. The new king, Edward II, ignored his father's wish, and had his favourite recalled from exile almost immediately. Edward II remained in the north until August, but then abandoned the campaign and headed south, partially due to financial limitations. He was crowned king on 25 February 1308.

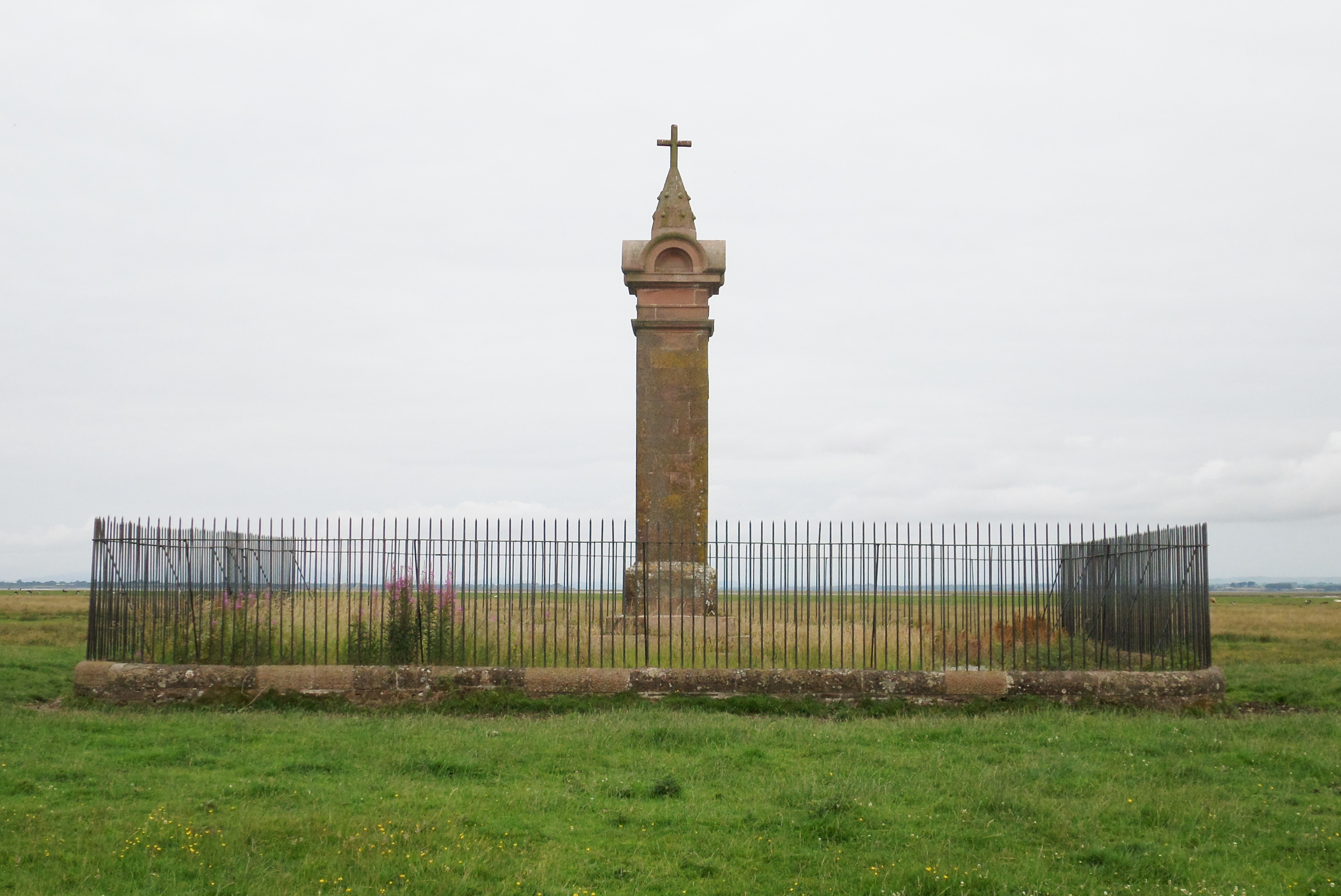
The 19th-century memorial to Edward I at Burgh Marsh, near the Scottish border. This structure replaced an earlier one and is said to mark the exact spot where he died.

Edward I's body was brought south, lying in state at Waltham Abbey, before being buried in Westminster Abbey on 27 October. There are few records of the funeral, which cost £473. (Note: 14,300 days labour for a skilled tradesman, or approximately £101,000 at 2017 prices.)

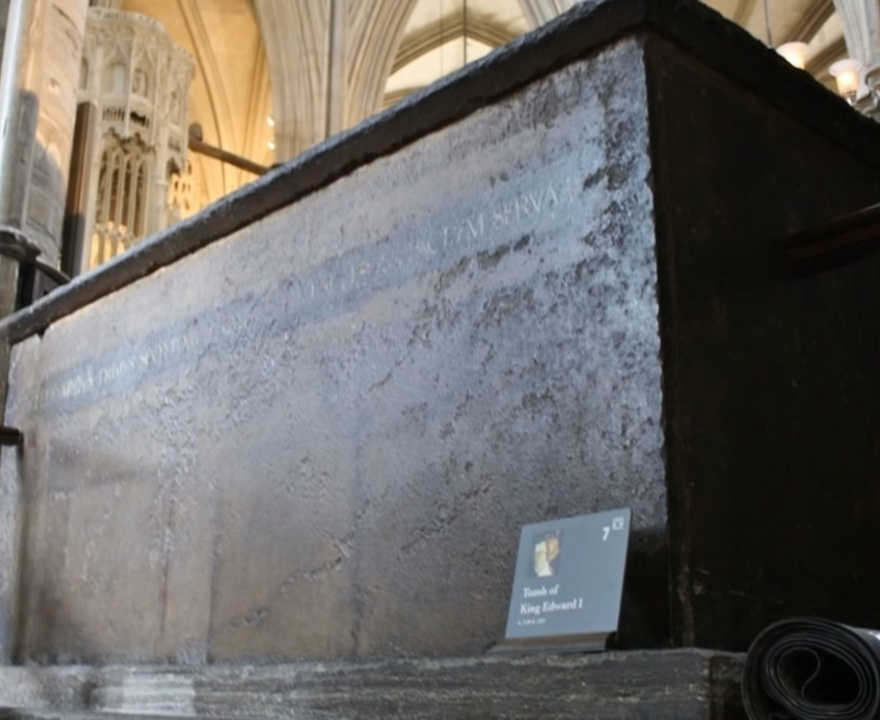
Tomb of Edward I

Edward's tomb was an unusually plain sarcophagus of Purbeck marble, without the customary royal effigy, possibly the result of the shortage of royal funds. The Society of Antiquaries of London opened the tomb in 1774, finding that the body had been well preserved over the preceding 467 years, and took the opportunity to determine the King's original height. (Note: The original report can be found in: Ayloffe, J. (1786). "An Account of the Body of King Edward the First, as it appeared on opening his Tomb in the year 1774". Archaeologia. iii: 386, 398–412. doi:10.1017/S0261340900016301.) Traces of the Latin inscription Edwardus Primus Scottorum Malleus hic est, 1308. Pactum Serva ("Here is Edward I, Hammer of the Scots, 1308. Keep the Troth") can still be seen painted on the side of the tomb, referring to his vow to avenge the rebellion of Robert the Bruce. This resulted in Edward being given the epithet the "Hammer of the Scots" by historians, but is not contemporary in origin, having been added by the Abbot John Feckenham in the 16th century.

== Legacy ==
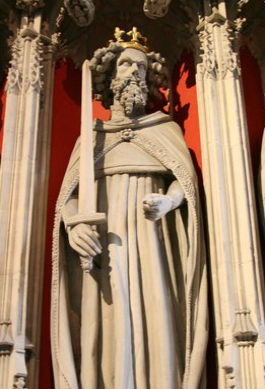
King Edward I's statue on the Kings' Screen in York Minster

The first histories of Edward in the 16th and 17th centuries drew primarily on the works of the chroniclers, and made little use of the official records of the period. They limited themselves to general comments on Edward's significance as a monarch, and echoed the chroniclers' praise for his accomplishments. In the 17th century, the lawyer Edward Coke wrote extensively about Edward's legislation, terming the King the "English Justinian" after the Byzantine lawmaker Justinian I. Later in the century, historians used the available record as evidence to elucidate the roles of Parliament and kingship under Edward, drawing comparisons between his reign and the political strife of their own century. In the 18th century, historians depicted Edward as an able, if ruthless, monarch, conditioned by the circumstances of his time.

The influential Victorian historian William Stubbs suggested that Edward had actively shaped national history, forming English laws and institutions, and helping England to develop a parliamentary and constitutional monarchy. His strengths and weaknesses as a ruler were considered to be emblematic of the English people as a whole. Stubbs's student, Thomas Tout, initially adopted the same perspective, but after extensive research into Edward's royal household, and backed by the research of his contemporaries into the early Parliaments of the period, he changed his mind. Tout came to view Edward as a self-interested, conservative leader, using the parliamentary system as "the shrewd device of an autocrat, anxious to use the mass of the people as a check upon his hereditary foes among the greater baronage."

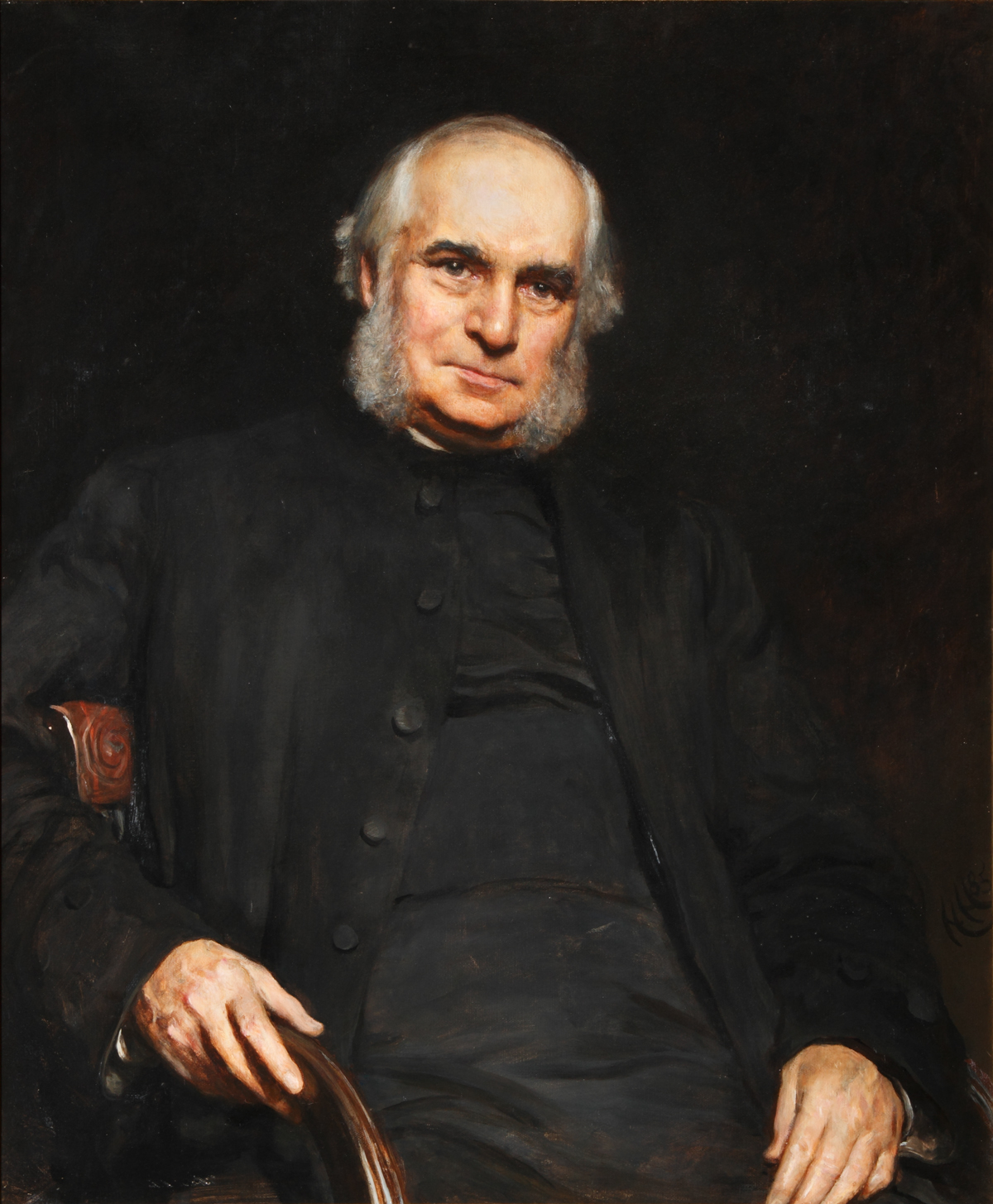
Bishop William Stubbs, in his Constitutional History, emphasised Edward I's contribution to the English constitution.

Historians in the 20th and 21st centuries have conducted extensive research on Edward and his reign. Most have concluded this was a highly significant period in English medieval history, some describing Edward as one of the great medieval kings, although most agree that his final years were less successful than his early decades in power. G. Templeman argued in his 1950 historiographical essay that "it is generally recognized that Edward I deserves a high place in the history of medieval England". Three major academic narratives of Edward have been produced during this period. F. M. Powicke's volumes, published in 1947 and 1953, forming the standard works on Edward for several decades, were largely positive in praising the achievements of his reign, and his focus on justice and the law. In 1988, Michael Prestwich produced an authoritative biography of the King, focusing on his political career, still portraying him in sympathetic terms, but highlighting some of the consequences of his failed policies. Marc Morris's biography followed in 2008, drawing out more of the detail of Edward's personality, and generally taking a harsher view of his weaknesses and less pleasant characteristics, pointing out that modern analysts of Edward's reign denounce the King for his policies against the Jewish community in England. Considerable academic debate has taken place around the character of Edward's kingship, his political skills, and his management of his earls, and whether this was collaborative or repressive in nature.

Historians have debated how Edward I's reign should be assessed: Michael Prestwich in 1988 attempted to judge him by the standards of his time. Fred Cazel agrees with this approach, particularly regarding his lack of political "sensitivity" and uncompromising attitudes, arguing that anger was his political weapon. Prestwich concludes that "Edward was a formidable king; his reign, with both its successes and its disappointments, a great one," and he was "without doubt one of the greatest rulers of his time". G. W. S. Barrow counters that Edward's contemporaries knew the "meaning of compassion, magnanimity, justice and generosity", that he rarely rose above minimum moral standards of his time, but rather showed a highly vindictive streak, and is among the "boldest opportunists of English political history". John Gillingham argues that Edward was an "effective bully", but "no king of England had a greater impact on the peoples of Britain than Edward I" and that "modern historians of the English state ... have always recognized Edward I's reign as pivotal." In 2014, Andrew Spencer and Caroline Burt reassessed Edward's reign from an English constitutional perspective, asserting that he had a personal role in reform and a moral purpose in his leadership. Spencer concludes that Edward's reign "was indeed ... a great one", and Burt claims that Edward was "innovative, ... creative, focused and successful". She adds that he "played the part of a good king well ... [and] with aplomb". Colin Veach asks whether "the Welsh, Scots, Irish and Jews would have agreed".

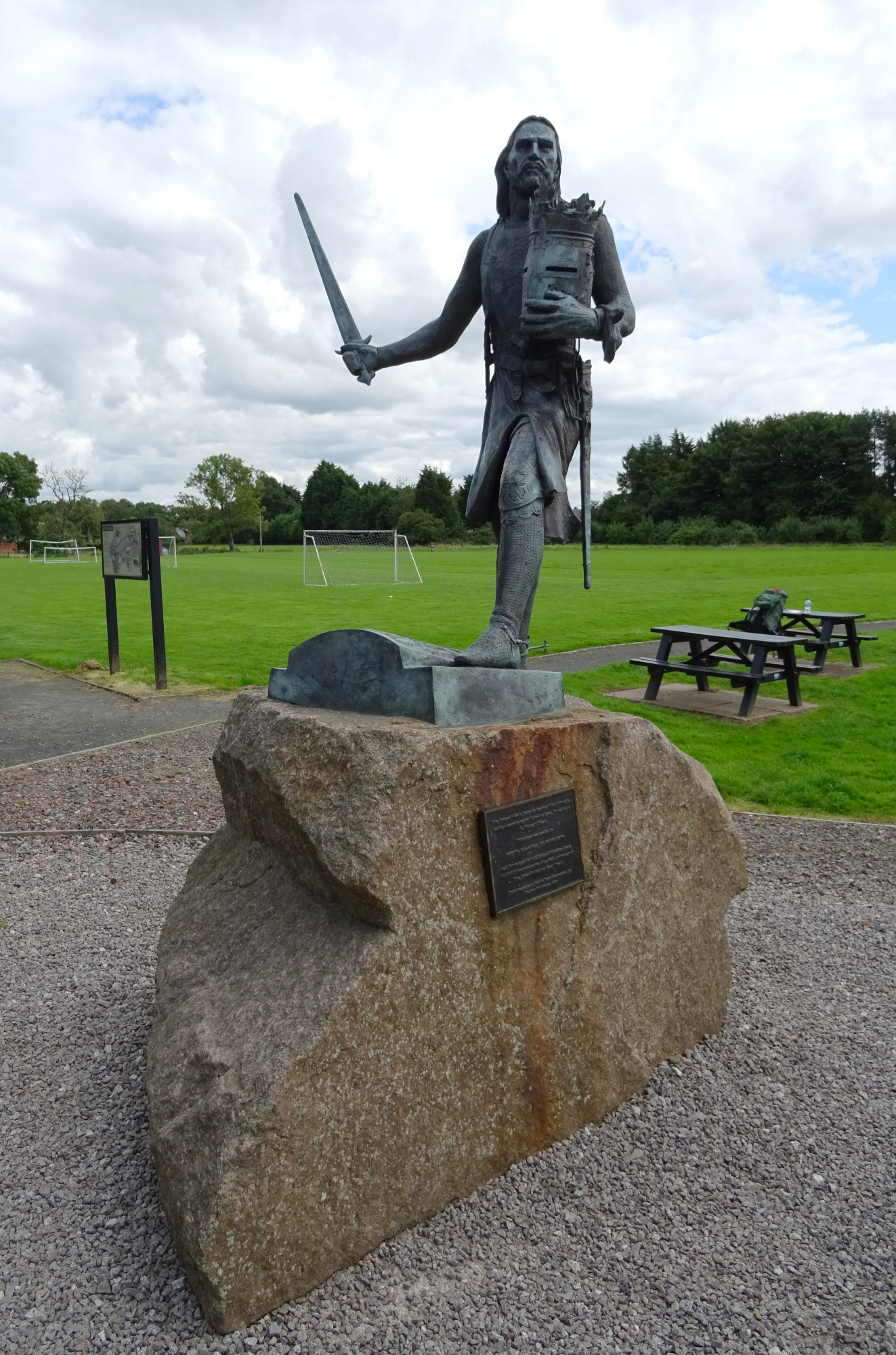
Statue of Edward I by Christopher Kelly, 2007

There is a great difference between English and Scottish historiography on King Edward. G. W. S. Barrow saw Edward as ruthlessly exploiting the leaderless state of Scotland to obtain feudal superiority over the kingdom and reduce it to an English possession. In his view, Edward's insistence on war and misapprehension of Scottish capacity for resistance created a "bitter antagonism ... which endured for centuries". Michael Brown warns that Scottish independence should not be viewed as inevitable; Edward could have achieved his goals. Welsh historians see Edward's reign and conquest as a disaster for Welsh confidence and culture. R. R. Davies views his methods in Wales as essentially colonialist, creating deep resentment and an "apartheid-like" social structure. John Davies noted the "anti-Welsh fanaticism" of the English colonists introduced by Edward's conquest. They acknowledge Edward's attempts to rebuild some kind of co-operation with native Welsh society, but state that this was insufficient to heal the trauma of conquest. Irish historian James Lydon regarded the 13th century and Edward's reign as a turning point for Ireland, as the Lordship extracted Irish resources for his wars, failed to maintain peace, and allowed a resurgence in the fortunes of Gaelic Ireland, leading to prolonged conflict. Simon Schama, Norman Davies, and historians from Scotland, Wales and Ireland, have tried to assess Edward's reign in the context of the development of Britain and Ireland. They emphasise the growing power of the law, centralised state and crown across Europe, and see Edward as asserting his rights within England and the other nations of Britain and Ireland. Brown adds that Edward suffered from this as a subject of the French king in Gascony. Centralisation tended to imply uniformity and increasing discrimination against peripheral identities and hostility to Irish and Welsh law. While this group of historians do not see Edward as having conducted a planned policy of expansionism, they often see the tactics and results of his policies as often having caused unnecessary division and conflict.

Barrie Dobson said that Edward I's actions towards the Jewish minority often appear to be the most relevant part of his reign for a modern audience, while in 1992 Colin Richmond expressed dismay that Edward had not received a wider re-evaluation. Paul Hyams sees his "sincere religious bigotry" as central to his actions against Jews, Richmond sees him as a "pioneering antisemite", and Robert Stacey regards him as the first English monarch to operate a state policy of antisemitism. (Note: Richmond notes that Edward was first not only to permanently expel the Jews, but also to attempt forced conversions, and to vindictively choose symbolic dates for his actions (see note on the expulsion date). Richmond observes that the Nazis later made the same practice in choosing Jewish Holy Days to commit atrocities against the Jews.) Robert Moore emphasises that antisemitism was developed by church leaders and acted on by figures including Edward, rather than being a facet of popular prejudice. Studies of medieval antisemitism identify Henry III and Edward's reigns, along with the Expulsion, as developing a persistent English antisemitism, based on the idea of the English superseding the Jews as God's chosen people, and on England's uniqueness as a country free of Jews.

== Family ==
=== First marriage ===
By his first wife Eleanor of Castile, Edward had at least fourteen children, perhaps as many as sixteen. Of these, five daughters survived into adulthood, but only one son outlived his father, becoming King Edward II (r. 1307–1327). Edward's children with Eleanor were:

1. Katherine (1261 or 1263–1264)
2. Joan (1265–1265)
3. John (1266–1271)
4. Henry (1268–1274)
5. Eleanor (1269–1298)
6. Unnamed daughter (1271–1271 or 1272)
7. Joan (1272–1307)
8. Alphonso (1273–1284)
9. Margaret (1275–1333)
10. Berengaria (1276–1277 or 1278)
11. Unnamed child (1278–1278)
12. Mary (1278–1332)
13. Elizabeth (1282–1316)
14. Edward II (1284–1327)

=== Second marriage ===
By Margaret of France, Edward had two sons, both of whom lived to adulthood, and a daughter who died as a child:

1. Thomas (1300–1338)
2. Edmund (1301–1330)
3. Eleanor (1306–1311)

A genealogy in the Hailes Abbey chronicle indicates that John Botetourt may have been Edward's illegitimate son, but the claim is unsubstantiated.

=== Genealogical table ===
Edward I's relationship to the contemporary leaders in Britain

Beatrice of Savoy | Ramon Berenguer V Count of Provence | John r. 1199–1216
Eleanor of Provence | Henry III r. 1216–1272 | Richard of Cornwall; King of Germany
Edward I r. 1272–1307 | Margaret of England | Alexander III; King of Scotland | Edmund Crouchback; Earl of Leicester | Henry of Almain
Edward II r. 1307–1327 | Margaret of Scotland; Queen of Norway
Margaret, Maid of Norway; Queen of Scotland

Isabella; Countess of Angoulême
Eleanor of England | Simon de Montfort; Earl of Leicester
Simon de Montfort the Younger | Eleanor de Montfort

Hugh X of Lusignan; Count of La Marche
William de Valence; Earl of Pembroke
Llywelyn ap Gruffudd; Prince of Wales

== See also ==
- List of earls in the reign of Edward I of England
- Savoyard knights in the service of Edward I

== Bibliography ==
- Bachrach, DS (2004). "The Ecclesia Anglicana goes to War: Prayers, Propaganda, and Conquest during the Reign of Edward I of England, 1272–1307". Albion. 36 (3): 393–406. doi:10.2307/4054365. JSTOR 4054365.
- Barrow, G. W. S. (Geoffrey Wallis Steuart) (1965). Robert Bruce and the Community of the Realm of Scotland. London: Eyre and Spottiswoode. OCLC 655056131.
  —— (1983) [1956]. Feudal Britain: The Completion of the Medieval Kingdoms, 1066-1314 (Paperback ed.). London: Hodder & Stoughton. ISBN 978-0713156256.
  —— (1989). "Edward I by Michael Prestwich". The Scottish Historical Review. 68 (186): 205–208. JSTOR 25530422.
- Brand, Paul (2003). Kings, Barons and Justices: The Making and Enforcement of Legislation in Thirteenth-Century England. Cambridge: Cambridge University Press. ISBN 0-5213-7246-1.
- Brears, Peter (2010). "Food Supply and Preparation at the Edwardian Castles". In Williams, Diane; Kenyon, John (eds.). The Impact of Edwardian Castles in Wales. Oxford: Oxbow Books. pp. 85–98. ISBN 978-1-8421-7380-0.
- Brown, A. L. (Alfred Lawson) (1989). The Governance of Late Medieval England 1272–1461. London: Edward Arnold. ISBN 0-8047-1730-3. OL 16832664M.
- Brown, Michael (2004). The Wars of Scotland 1214–1371. New Edinburgh History of Scotland. Edinburgh: Edinburgh University Press. ISBN 0-7486-1238-6. OL 9890348M.
- Burt, Caroline (2013). Edward I and the Governance of England, 1272–1307. Cambridge and New York: Cambridge University Press. ISBN 978-0-5218-8999-5.
- Burt, Caroline; Partington, Richard (2024). Arise, England: Six Kings and the Making of the English State. London: Faber & Faber. ISBN 978-0-571-31198-9.
- Carpenter, David (2007). "King Henry III and Saint Edward The Confessor: The Origins of the Cult". English Historical Review. cxxii (498): 865–891. doi:10.1093/ehr/cem214.
  —— (1985). "The Lord Edward's Oath to Aid and Counsel Simon de Montfort, 15 October 1259". Bulletin of the Institute of Historical Research. 58 (138): 226–237. doi:10.1111/j.1468-2281.1985.tb01170.x.
  —— (2004). The Struggle for Mastery: Britain, 1066–1284. London: Penguin Books. ISBN 978-0-1401-4824-4. OL 7348814M.
- Cathcart King, David James (1988). The Castle in England and Wales: An Interpretative History. London: Croom Helm. ISBN 0-9184-0008-2.
- Cazel, Fred A. (1991). "Edward I, by Michael Prestwich". Speculum. 66 (1): 225–227. doi:10.2307/2864011. JSTOR 2864011.
- Chancellor, John (1981). The Life and Times of Edward I. London: Weidenfeld & Nicolson. ISBN 0-2977-7840-4. OL 3817070M.
- Chaplais, Pierre (1982). English Medieval Diplomatic Practice. Vol. I. London: Public Record Office. ISBN 9780114401085 – via archive.org.
- Coldstream, Nicola (2010). "James of St George". In Williams, Diane; Kenyon, John (eds.). The Impact of Edwardian Castles in Wales. Oxford: Oxbow Books. pp. 37–45. ISBN 978-1-8421-7380-0.
- Cornell, David (2009). Bannockburn: The Triumph of Robert the Bruce. New Haven and London: Yale University Press. ISBN 978-0-3001-4568-7. OCLC 256769491. OL 23958360M.
- Davies, John (2007) [1990]. A History of Wales (Revised ed.). London: Penguin Books. ISBN 9780140284751. OL 7352278M.
- Davies, Norman (1999). The Isles: A History. Oxford: Macmillan. ISBN 978-0333692837. OL 39554M.
- Davies, R. R. (2000) [1987]. The Age of Conquest: Wales, 1063–1415. Oxford and New York: Oxford University Press. ISBN 0-1982-0878-2.
  —— (1984). "Medieval Severnside". In R. A. Griffiths; I. G. Jones; K. O. Morgan (eds.). Welsh Society and Nationhood. Cardiff: University of Wales Press. ISBN 0-7083-0890-2.
  —— (1990). Dominion and Conquest: The Experience of Ireland, Scotland and Wales 1100–1300. Wiles Lectures. Cambridge: Cambridge University Press. ISBN 0-521-38069-3.
- Despres, Denise L. (1998). "Immaculate Flesh and the Social Body: Mary and the Jews". Jewish History. 12: 47–69. doi:10.1007/BF02335453.
- Denton, J. H. (1989). "Edward I by Michael Prestwich". English Historical Review. 104 (413): 981–984. doi:10.1093/ehr/CIV.413.981.
- Duffy, Mark (2003). Royal Tombs of Medieval England. Stroud: Tempus. ISBN 978-0-7524-2579-5.
- Frame, Robin (1990). The Political Development of the British Isles 1100–1400. Oxford: Oxford University Press. doi:10.1093/acprof:oso/9780198206040.001.0001. ISBN 9780198206040.
  —— (1998). Ireland and Britain 1170 to 1450. London: Bloomsbury Publishing. ISBN 9781852851491. OL 697345M.
- Friar, Stephen (2003). The Sutton Companion to Castles. Stroud: Sutton Publishing. ISBN 978-0-7509-3994-2.
- Gillingham, John (2008). "Hard on Wales". Times Literary Supplement. London: Times Literary Supplement. Archived from the original on 25 March 2020.
- Glassman, Bernard (1975). Antisemitic Stereotypes Without Jews: Images of the Jews 1290–1700. Detroit: Wayne State University Press. ISBN 978-0814315453.
- Gorski, Richard (2009). "Botetourt, John, first Lord Botetourt (d. 1324)". Oxford Dictionary of National Biography (online ed.). Oxford: Oxford University Press. doi:10.1093/ref:odnb/2966. (Subscription, Wikipedia Library access or UK public library membership required.)
- Haines, Roy Martin (2003). King Edward II: His Life, his Reign and its Aftermath, 1284–1330. Montreal, Canada and Kingston, Canada: McGill-Queen's University Press. ISBN 978-0-7735-3157-4.
- Hamilton, J. S. (2010). The Plantagenets: History of a Dynasty. London and New York: Continuum. ISBN 978-1-4411-5712-6. OL 28013041M.
- Harding, Vanessa (2002). The Dead and the Living in Paris and London, 1500–1670. Cambridge: Cambridge University Press. ISBN 978-0-5218-1126-2.
- Harriss, G. L. (Gerald Leslie) (1975). King, Parliament and Public Finance in Medieval England to 1369. Oxford: Clarendon Press. ISBN 0-1982-2435-4. OL 5255143M – via archive.org.
- Hyams, Paul (1974). "The Jewish Minority in Medieval England, 1066–1290". Journal of Jewish Studies. xxv (2): 270–293. doi:10.18647/682/JJS-1974.
- Goldsmith, Jeremy (2009). "A Great and Terrible King: Edward I and the Forging of Britain". Reviews in History. University of London. ISSN 1749-8155. Archived from the original on 22 March 2019.
- Hillaby, Joe (1994). "The Ritual-Child-Murder Accusation: Its Dissemination and Harold of Gloucester". Jewish Historical Studies. 34: 69–109. JSTOR 29779954.
- Hillaby, Joe; Hillaby, Caroline (2013). The Palgrave Dictionary of Medieval Anglo-Jewish History. Basingstoke: Palgrave Macmillan. ISBN 9780230278165. OL 28086241M.
- Huscroft, Richard (2006). Expulsion: England's Jewish Solution. Stroud: Tempus. ISBN 9780752437293. OL 7982808M.
- Jenks, Edward (1989) [1902]. Edward Plantagenet: The English Justinian or the Making of Common Law. New York: G. P. Putnam's Sons. ISBN 0-8369-5070-4. OL 8205523M.
- Jobson, Adrian (2012). The First English Revolution: Simon de Montfort, Henry III and the Barons' War. London: Bloomsbury. ISBN 978-1-8472-5226-5.
- Krieger, Larry; Neill, Kenneth; Jantzen, Steven (1992). World History: Perspectives on the Past. Lexington, Mass.: D. C. Health and Company. ISBN 0-669-25598-X. OL 7629944M.
- Lilley, Keith D. (2010). "The Landscapes of Edward's New Towns: Their Planning and Design". In Williams, Diane; Kenyon, John (eds.). The Impact of Edwardian Castles in Wales. Oxford: Oxbow Books. pp. 99–113. ISBN 978-1-8421-7380-0.
- Lloyd, Simon (1986). "Gilbert de Clare, Richard of Cornwall and the Lord Edward's Crusade". Nottingham Medieval Studies. 30: 46–66. doi:10.1484/J.NMS.3.133.
- Loomis, Roger Sherman (1953). "Edward I, Arthurian Enthusiast". Speculum. 28 (1): 114–127. doi:10.2307/2847184. JSTOR 2847184. S2CID 164043032.
- Lydon, James (2008a). "The Years of Crisis, 1254–1315". In Cosgrove, Art (ed.). A New History of Ireland Volume II 1169–1534. Oxford: Oxford University Press. pp. 179–204. doi:10.1093/acprof:oso/9780199539703.003.0008. ISBN 9780199539703. OL 9793047M.
  —— (2008b). "A Land of War". In Cosgrove, Art (ed.). A New History of Ireland Volume II 1169–1534. Oxford: Oxford University Press. pp. 240–274. doi:10.1093/acprof:oso/9780199539703.003.0010. ISBN 9780199539703. OL 9793047M.
- Maddicott, John (1983). "The Mise of Lewes, 1264". English Historical Review. 98 (338): 588–603. doi:10.1093/ehr/xcviii.ccclxxxviii.588.
  —— (1989). "The Crusade Taxation of 1268–70 and the Development of Parliament". In P. R. Coss; S. D. Lloyd (eds.). Thirteenth Century England. Vol. 2. Woodbridge: Boydell Press. pp. 93–117. ISBN 0-8511-5513-8.
  —— (1994). Simon de Montfort. Cambridge: Cambridge University Press. ISBN 0-5213-7493-6.
  —— (2010). The Origins of the English Parliament, 924–1327. Oxford and New York: Oxford University Press. ISBN 978-0-1995-8550-2.
- McFarlane, K. B. (1981). The Nobility of Later Medieval England. London: The Hambledon Press. ISBN 0-9506-8825-8.
- Moore, R. I. (2006). The Formation of a Persecuting Society: Authority and Deviance in Western Europe 950–1250 (2nd ed.). Malden, Oxford and Victoria: Blackwell. ISBN 9781405129640. OL 8405718M.
- Morris, Marc (2009). A Great and Terrible King: Edward I and the Forging of Britain. London: Windmill Books. ISBN 978-0-0994-8175-1.
- National Archives (2024). "Currency Converter: 1270–2017". National Archives. Archived from the original on 13 June 2017.
- Parsons, John Carmi (1984). "The Year of Eleanor of Castile's Birth and her Children by Edward I". Medieval Studies. XLVI: 245–265. doi:10.1484/J.MS.2.306316.
  —— (1995). Eleanor of Castile: Queen and Society in Thirteenth Century England. New York: St. Martin's Press. ISBN 9780312086497. OL 3502870W.
  —— (2008). "Margaret (1279?–1318)". Oxford Dictionary of National Biography (online ed.). Oxford, UK: Oxford University Press. doi:10.1093/ref:odnb/18046. (Subscription, Wikipedia Library access or UK public library membership required.)
- Phillips, Seymour (2011). Edward II. New Haven, US and London: Yale University Press. ISBN 978-0-3001-7802-9.
- Pilling, David (2021). "5. Edward I's War on the Continent, 1297–1298: A New Appraisal". In Rogers, Clifford J.; France, John; DeVries, Kelly (eds.). Journal of Medieval Military History. Vol. XIX. Suffolk, England; Rochester, New York: Boydell & Brewer. pp. 77–118. doi:10.1515/9781800102286-006. ISBN 9781800102286. ISSN 1477-545X.
- Plucknett, Theodore Frank Thomas (1949). Legislation of Edward I. Oxford: Clarendon Press. OCLC 983476.
- Powicke, F. M. (Frederick Maurice) (1947). King Henry III and the Lord Edward: The Community of the Realm in the Thirteenth Century. Oxford: Clarendon Press. OCLC 1044503.
  —— (1962). The Thirteenth Century, 1216–1307 (2nd ed.). Oxford: Clarendon Press. OCLC 3693188.
- Prestwich, Michael (1972). War, Politics and Finance under Edward I. London: Faber and Faber. ISBN 0-5710-9042-7.
  —— (1997) [1988]. Edward I. English Monarchs (Revised Second ed.). New Haven and London: Yale University Press. ISBN 978-0-3000-7209-9. OL 704063M.
  —— (2003). The Three Edwards: War and State in England, 1272–1377 (2nd ed.). London: Routledge. ISBN 978-0-4153-0309-5.
  —— (2005). Plantagenet England: 1225–1360 (new ed.). Oxford and New York: Oxford University Press. ISBN 978-0-1982-2844-8. OL 3404029M.
  —— (2008). "Edward I (1239–1307)". Oxford Dictionary of National Biography. Oxford University Press. doi:10.1093/ref:odnb/8517. ISBN 978-0-1986-1412-8. (subscription, Wikipedia Library access or UK public library membership required)
  —— (2010). "Edward I and Wales". In Williams, Diane; Kenyon, John (eds.). The Impact of Edwardian Castles in Wales. Oxford: Oxbow Books. pp. 1–8. ISBN 978-1-8421-7380-0.
- Raban, Sandra (2000). England Under Edward I and Edward II, 1259–1327. Oxford: Blackwell. ISBN 978-0-6312-2320-7. OL 22376314M.
- Richardson, Henry (1960). English Jewry under Angevin Kings. London: Methuen. OL 17927110M – via archive.org.
- Richmond, Colin (1992). "Englishness and Medieval Anglo-Jewry". In Kushner, Tony (ed.). The Jewish Heritage in British History. Oxon and New York: Frank Cass. pp. 42–59. ISBN 0714634646.
- Riley-Smith, Jonathan (2005). The Crusades: A History. London: Continuum. ISBN 0-8264-7269-9.
- Rokéah, Zefira Entin (1988). "Money and the Hangman in Late Thirteenth Century England: Jews, Christians and Coinage Offences Alleged and Real (Part I)". Jewish Historical Studies. 31: 83–109. JSTOR 29779864.
- Rodwell, Warwick (2013). The Coronation Chair and Stone of Scone: History, Archaeology and Conservation. Oxford: Oxbow Books. ISBN 978-1-7829-7152-8.
- Rogers, J.E. Thorold (1891). Oxford City Documents: 1268-1665. Oxford: Clarendon press. OL 15965764W.
- Roth, Cecil (1978) [1964]. A History of the Jews in England (Third ed.). Oxford: Clarendon Press. ISBN 978-0198224884.
- Runciman, Steven (2012) [1958]. The Sicilian Vespers: A History of the Mediterranean World in the Later Thirteenth Century. Baltimore: Penguin Books. ISBN 978-1-1076-0474-2.
- Sadler, John (2008). The Second Barons' War: Simon de Montfort and the Battles of Lewes and Evesham. Barnsley: Pen and Sword Military. ISBN 978-1-8441-5831-7.
- Salzman, Louis Francis (1968). Edward I. London: Constable. ISBN 0-4861-2766-4. OL 18353247M.
- Schama, Simon (2000). "Aliens and Natives". A History of Britain. London: BBC Worldwide. pp. 155–221. ISBN 0563384972.
- Shapiro, James (1996). Shakespeare and the Jews (Twentieth Anniversary ed.). Chichester, West Sussex: Columbia University Press. ISBN 978-0-231-17867-9.
- Skinner, Patricia (2003). "Introduction". In Skinner, Patricia (ed.). Jews in Medieval Britain. Woodbridge: Boydell Press. pp. 1–11. ISBN 0851159311.
- Smith, J.B. (1998). Llywelyn ap Gruffudd, Prince of Wales. University of Wales Press. ISBN 9781786833860.
- Spencer, Andrew (2014). Nobility and Kingship in Medieval England: The Earls and Edward I, 1272–1307. Cambridge and New York: Cambridge University Press. ISBN 978-1-1070-2675-9.
- Stacey, Robert C. (1990). "Review of 'Edward I', by Michael Prestwich". The Historian. 52 (2): 307–308.
  —— (1997). "Parliamentary Negotiation and the Expulsion of the Jews from England". In Prestwich, Michael; Britnell, Richard H.; Frame, Robin (eds.). Thirteenth Century England: Proceedings of the Durham Conference, 1995. Vol. 6. Woodbridge: Boydell Press. pp. 77–102. ISBN 978-0-85115-674-3.
  —— (2001). "Anti-Semitism and the Medieval English State". In Maddicott, J. R.; Pallister, D. M. (eds.). The Medieval State: Essays Presented to James Campbell. London: The Hambledon Press. pp. 163–177. ISBN 9780826443496.
- Stephenson, David (2016). Medieval Powys, Kingdom, Principality and Lordships 1132-1293. Boydell Press. ISBN 978-1783271405.
- —— (2019). Medieval Wales c.1050-1332: Centuries of Ambiguity. Rethinking the History of Wales. University of Wales Press. ISBN 9781786833860.
- —— (2014) [1984]. Political Power in Medieval Gwynedd, Governance and the Welsh Princes. Studies in Welsh History (Revised ed.). University of Wales Press. ISBN 9781783160044.
- Stocker, David (1986). "The Shrine of Little St Hugh". Medieval Art and Architecture at Lincoln Cathedral. Leeds: British Archaeological Association. pp. 109–117. ISBN 9780907307143 – via archive.org.
- Stubbs, William (1880). The Constitutional History of England. Vol. 2. Oxford: Clarendon Press – via archive.org.
- Sutherland, Donald (1963). Quo Warranto Proceedings in the Reign of Edward I, 1278–1294. Oxford: Clarendon Press. ISBN 9780198213086. OCLC 408401.
- Templeman, G. (1950). "Edward I and the Historians". Cambridge Historical Journal. 10 (1): 16–35. doi:10.1017/S1474691300002663. JSTOR 3021067.
- Tolan, John (2023). England's Jews: Finance, Violence, and the Crown in the Thirteenth Century. Philadelphia: University of Pennsylvania Press. ISBN 978-1512823899. OL 39646815M.
- Tomasch, Sylvia (2002). "Postcolonial Chaucer and the Virtual Jew". In Delany, Sheila (ed.). Chaucer and the Jews. London: Routledge. pp. 43–58. ISBN 9780415938822. OL 7496826M.
- Tout, Thomas Frederick (1920). Chapters in the Administrative History of Mediaeval England: The Wardrobe, the Chamber and the Small Seals. Vol. 2. Manchester: Manchester University Press. OCLC 832154714.
- Vale, Malcolm (1990). The Origins of the Hundred Years War: The Angevin Legacy 1250–1340. Oxford and New York: Oxford University Press. doi:10.1093/acprof:oso/9780198206200.001.0001. ISBN 9780191677014.
- Veach, Colin (2014). "Cambridge Views of Edward: Caroline Burt, Edward I and the Governance of England, 1272–1307. Cambridge: Cambridge University Press, 2012; Andrew M. Spencer, Nobility and Kingship in Medieval England: The Earls and Edward I, 1272–1307. Cambridge: Cambridge University Press, 2013". Óenach Reviews. 6 (2): 11–18.
- Watson, Fiona J. (1998). Under the Hammer: Edward I and the Throne of Scotland, 1286–1307. East Linton: Tuckwell Press. ISBN 1-8623-2031-4.
- Waugh, Scott L. (2004a). "Edmund, First Earl of Kent (1301–1330)". Oxford Dictionary of National Biography (online ed.). Oxford, UK: Oxford University Press. doi:10.1093/ref:odnb/8506. (Subscription, Wikipedia Library access or UK public library membership required.)
  —— (2004b). "Thomas, 1st Earl of Norfolk (1300–1338)". Oxford Dictionary of National Biography (online ed.). Oxford, UK: Oxford University Press. doi:10.1093/ref:odnb/27196. (Subscription, Wikipedia Library access or UK public library membership required.)
- Wheatley, Abigail (2010). "Caernarfon Castle and its Mythology". In Williams, Diane; Kenyon, John (eds.). The Impact of Edwardian Castles in Wales. Oxford: Oxbow Books. pp. 129–139. ISBN 978-1-8421-7380-0.

Edward I House of Plantagenet Born: 17/18 June 1239 Died: 7 July 1307
Regnal titles
| Preceded by Henry III | King of England; Lord of Ireland; 1272–1307 | Succeeded by Edward II |
| Preceded by Henry III | Duke of Aquitaine; Duke of Gascony; 1254–1306 | Succeeded by Edward II |
| Preceded by Joan | Count of Ponthieu; 1279–1290 with Eleanor | Succeeded by Edward II |
Political offices
| Preceded by Matthew de Hastings | Lord Warden of the Cinque Ports; 1265–1266 | Succeeded by Sir Matthew de Bezille |
