= Alphonso, Earl of Chester =

Heir apparent to Edward I of England (1273–1284)

Alphonso
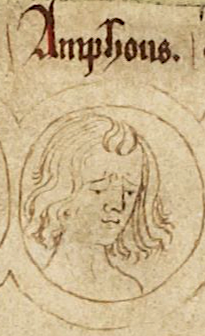
- Alphonso as portrayed in an early-14th-century genealogical roll of the kings of England
- Born: 24 November 1273; Bayonne, Gascony, France
- Died: 19 August 1284 (aged 10); Windsor Castle, Berkshire, England
- Burial: 26 August 1284; Westminster Abbey, London, England
- House: Plantagenet
- Father: Edward I of England
- Mother: Eleanor of Castile

Alphonso or Alfonso (24 November 1273 – 19 August 1284), also called Alphonsus and Alphonse and styled Earl of Chester, was an heir apparent to the English throne who never became king.

Alphonso was the ninth child of King Edward I of England and his Castilian wife Eleanor. He was born in Bayonne, Gascony, a duchy claimed by his maternal uncle King Alphonso X of Castile until his parents' marriage in 1254. Edward and Eleanor's friendship with the King of Castile was also confirmed when they named their son in his honour, a "remarkable choice" given the name's rarity in England. Queen Eleanor even persuaded her brother to travel to Gascony and serve as godfather at the young prince's baptism.

Alphonso's eldest brother, John, had died in 1271; the death of another older brother, Henry, in 1274, made Alphonso the couple's only son up until the last months of his life. As his parents were often required to travel, Alphonso had a household of his own. Queen Eleanor was nevertheless invested in the upbringing of her son, who even had a Spanish cook.

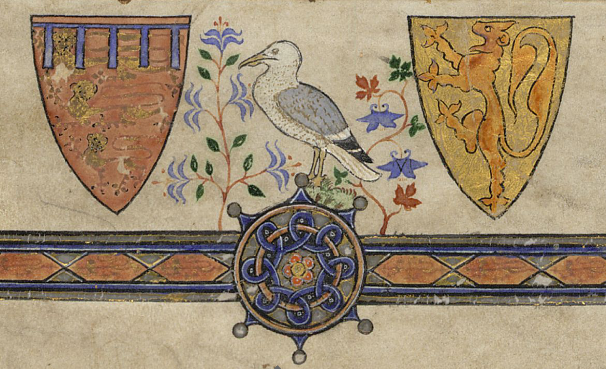
Alphonso's and Margaret's coats of arms, from his eponymous psalter

At the age of ten, Alphonso was engaged to Margaret, daughter of Floris V, Count of Holland. An opulent psalter was being prepared for the marriage when he fell ill and died a few months before the wedding was to take place. The king and queen greeted the death of their son with deep sadness; at the same time, the historian Michael Prestwich noted that in memory of the king's nephew, Henry of Brittany, who died a month later, Edward and Eleanor ordered more masses than in memory of their son.

The Alphonso Psalter, now in the British Library, was completed a decade later when his sister Elizabeth married Margaret's brother, John I, Count of Holland, making the pairing of arms again appropriate.

Alphonso's death at Windsor occurred shortly after the birth of his younger brother Edward, who became the oldest surviving male heir of Edward I. Alphonso was interred in The Confessor's Chapel at Westminster Abbey, although the exact location is unknown. His heart, however, was buried at the priory of Blackfriars, London (now destroyed).

As heirs apparent to the throne, both Alphonso and Edward bore the arms of the kingdom, differenced by a label azure.

== Ancestry ==
Ancestors of Alphonso, Earl of Chester

8. John of England
4. Henry III of England
9. Isabella of Angoulême
2. Edward I of England
10. Ramon Berenguer IV, Count of Provence
5. Eleanor of Provence
11. Beatrice of Savoy
1. Alphonso of England, Earl of Chester
12. Alfonso IX of León
6. Ferdinand III of Castile
13. Berengaria of Castile
3. Eleanor of Castile
14. Simon de Dammartin
7. Joan, Countess of Ponthieu
15. Marie, Countess of Ponthieu
