= List of earls in the reign of Edward I of England =

The following individuals were Earls (suo jure or jure uxoris) or Countesses (suo jure) during the reign of King Edward I of England who reigned from 1272 to 1307.

The period of tenure as Earl or Countess is given after the name and title of each individual, including any period of minority.

- Earl of Arundel
  - Richard FitzAlan, 8th Earl of Arundel (1272–1302)
  - Edmund FitzAlan, 9th Earl of Arundel (1302–1326)
- Earl of Cornwall
  - Edmund, 2nd Earl of Cornwall (1272–1300)
- Earl of Devon
  - Isabella de Forz (née de Redvers), 8th Countess of Devon suo jure (1262–1293)
- Earl of Essex
  - Humphrey de Bohun, 2nd Earl of Hereford, 1st Earl of Essex (1220–1275)
  - Humphrey de Bohun, 3rd Earl of Hereford, 2nd Earl of Essex (1275–1298)
  - Humphrey de Bohun, 4th Earl of Hereford, 3rd Earl of Essex (1298–1322)
- Earl of Gloucester
  - Gilbert de Clare, 7th Earl of Gloucester, 6th Earl of Hertford, (1262–1295)
  - Ralph de Monthermer, 1st Baron Monthermer, Earl of Gloucester jure uxoris (1295–1307)
- Earl of Hereford
  - Humphrey de Bohun, 2nd Earl of Hereford, 1st Earl of Essex (1220–1275)
  - Humphrey de Bohun, 3rd Earl of Hereford, 2nd Earl of Essex (1275–1298)
  - Humphrey de Bohun, 4th Earl of Hereford, 3rd Earl of Essex (1298–1322)
- Earl of Hertford
  - Gilbert de Clare, 7th Earl of Gloucester, 6th Earl of Hertford, (1262–1295)
  - Ralph de Monthermer, 1st Baron Monthermer, Earl of Hertford jure uxoris (1295–1307)
- Earl of Lancaster
  - Edmund Crouchback, 1st Earl of Lancaster, 1st Earl of Leicester (1267–1296)
  - Thomas, 2nd Earl of Lancaster, 2nd Earl of Leicester (1296–1322)
- Earl of Leicester
  - Edmund Crouchback, 1st Earl of Lancaster, 1st Earl of Leicester (1267–1296)
  - Thomas, 2nd Earl of Lancaster, 2nd Earl of Leicester (1296–1322)
- Earl of Lincoln
  - Henry de Lacy, 3rd Earl of Lincoln (1272–1311)
- Earl of Norfolk
  - Roger Bigod, 5th Earl of Norfolk (1270–1306)
- Earl of Oxford
  - Robert de Vere, 5th Earl of Oxford (1263–1296)
  - Robert de Vere, 6th Earl of Oxford (1296–1331)
- Earl of Pembroke
  - William de Valence, 1st Earl of Pembroke (? - 1296)
  - Aymer de Valence, 2nd Earl of Pembroke (1296–1324)
- Earl of Richmond
  - John II, Duke of Brittany, 3rd Earl of Richmond (1268–1305)
  - John of Brittany, Earl of Richmond (1306–1334)
- Earl of Salisbury
  - Margaret Longespée, 4th Countess of Salisbury suo jure (1261–1310)
- Earl of Surrey
  - John de Warenne, 6th Earl of Surrey (1240–1304)
  - John de Warenne, 7th Earl of Surrey (1304–1347)
- Earl of Warwick
  - William de Beauchamp, 9th Earl of Warwick (1268–1298)
  - Guy de Beauchamp, 10th Earl of Warwick (1298–1315)

== Sources ==
Ellis, Geoffrey. (1963) Earldoms in Fee: A Study in Peerage Law and History. London: The Saint Catherine Press, Limited.

Morris, Marc. (2005) The Bigod Earls of Norfolk in the Thirteenth Century. Woodbridge: The Boydell Press. ISBN 9781783270095

Spencer, Andrew M. (2014) Nobility and Kingship in Medieval England: The Earls and Edward I, 1272-1307. Cambridge: Cambridge University Press. ISBN 9781107608481
