= Henry (son of Edward I) =

Heir apparent to Edward I (1268–1274)

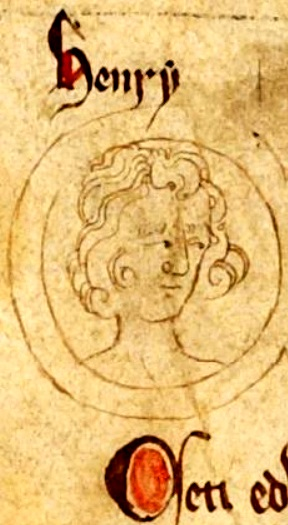
- Depiction of Henry on the family tree
- Born: 6 May 1268; Windsor Castle, Berkshire, England
- Died: 16 October 1274 (aged 6); Guildford, England
- Burial: 20 October 1274; Westminster Abbey
- House: Plantagenet
- Father: Edward I of England
- Mother: Eleanor of Castile

Henry of England (6 May 1268 – 16 October 1274) was the fourth child and second son of Edward I of England by his first wife, Eleanor of Castile.

== Early years ==
Henry was born in Windsor Castle during the reign of his paternal grandfather, Henry III of England. On 3 August 1271, Henry's older brother John died in the custody of their paternal granduncle Richard of Cornwall. His death left Henry the eldest surviving child of Edward and second-in-line to the throne of England. Henry III died on 16 November 1272. Edward became King of England and Henry his heir apparent. In 1273, Henry was betrothed to Joan I of Navarre.

== Death ==
When Henry lay dying at Guildford on 16 October 1274, neither of his parents made the short journey from London to see him. He was tended by his grandmother, Eleanor of Provence, who had raised him during the four years his parents were on Crusade. The queen dowager was thus at that moment more familiar to him than his parents, and thus better able to comfort him in his illness. Since Henry was always sickly, the gravity of his illness was perhaps not realised until it was too late for his parents to reach him. He died of natural causes and was buried in Westminster Abbey.

== Ancestry ==
Ancestors of Henry (son of Edward I)

8. John of England
4. Henry III of England
9. Isabella of Angoulême
2. Edward I of England
10. Ramon Berenguer IV, Count of Provence
5. Eleanor of Provence
11. Beatrice of Savoy
1. Henry, son of Edward I
12. Alfonso IX of León
6. Ferdinand III of Castile
13. Berengaria of Castile
3. Eleanor of Castile
14. Simon de Dammartin
7. Joan of Ponthieu
15. Marie, Countess of Ponthieu
