= Keith Lilley =

Keith Lilley (born 1967) is professor at Queen's University Belfast, known as a historical geographer and urban historian.

After studying at University of Birmingham as both undergraduate and postgraduate, Lilley had a productive career as one of few exponents of Urban morphology in the known world. His books include Urban Life in the Middle Ages: 1000-1450 (Palgrave, 2002), City and Cosmos: The Medieval World in Urban Form (Reaktion, 2009), and Mapping Medieval Geographies (Cambridge University Press, 2013).

His hobbies include cycling and walking.
