= Cefnllys =

Historic borough in Powys, Wales

Cefnllys: Welsh: Cefn-llys
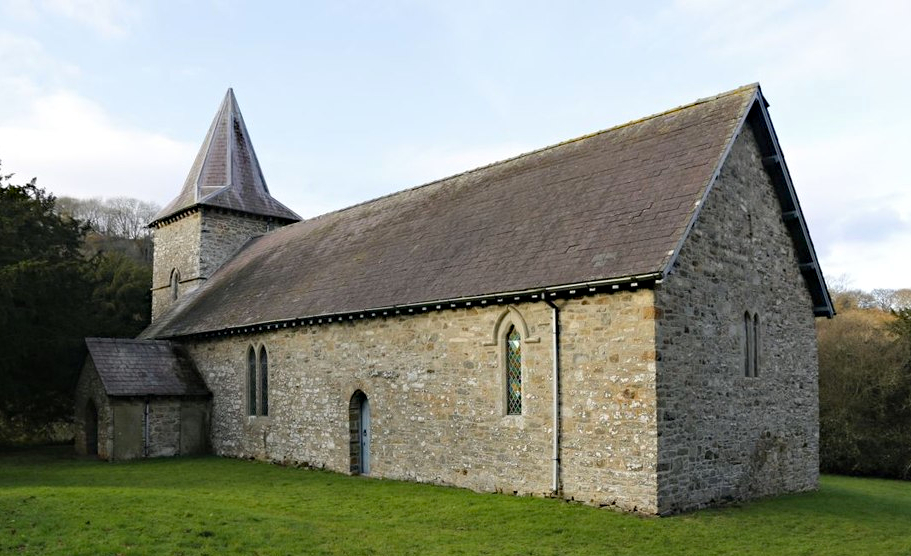
- St Michael's Church
- OS grid reference: SO08936146
- Community: Llandrindod Wells
- Principal area: Powys
- Preserved county: Powys
- Country: Wales
- Sovereign state: United Kingdom
- Post town: Llandrindod Wells
- Postcode district: LD1
- Police: Dyfed-Powys
- Fire: Mid and West Wales
- Ambulance: Welsh

Cefnllys is an abandoned ghost village, formerly a medieval castle town and borough, near Llandrindod Wells in Radnorshire (now part of Powys), Wales. The settlement was founded during the 13th century by the Mortimer family in order to strengthen their hold on land in the vicinity of the Cefnllys Castle, with which the town was closely associated. The town was probably intended to become the primary settlement of the lordship and cantref of Maelienydd, but was unsuccessful and declined during the 14th century as a result of bubonic plague outbreaks, economic isolation and military insecurity. Despite this, Cefnllys retained its borough status until the 19th century.

== History ==
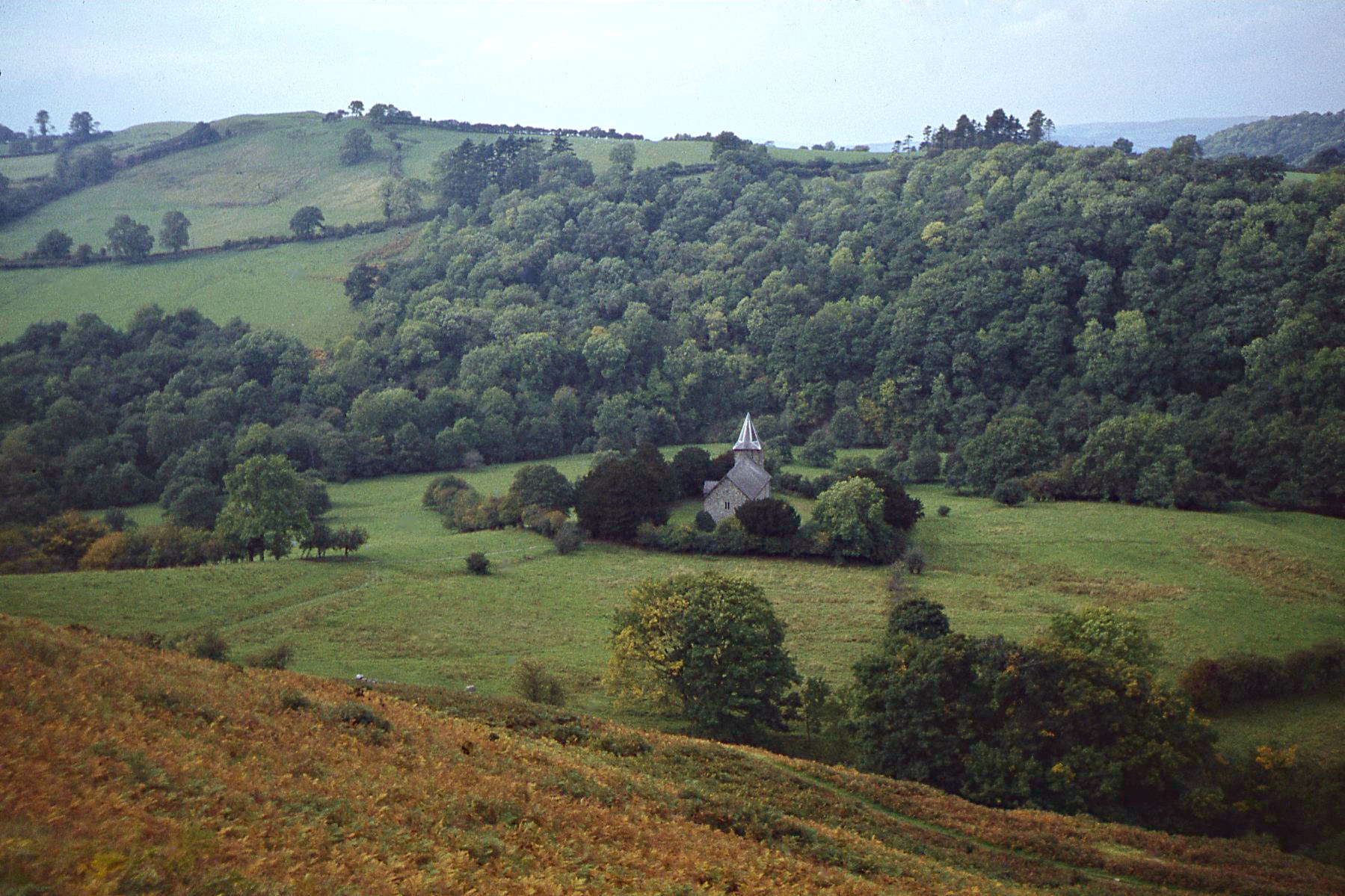
View of the church and surrounding earthworks

The date of the town's founding is unrecorded. It may have been established concurrently with the first stone castle at Cefnllys in the 1240s, but a later date is more likely, particularly after the creation of royally-sponsored English towns at Flint, Aberystwyth, and Rhuddlan in the aftermath of Edward I's conquest of Wales. The settlement was extant in 1297, when it was documented as being granted a market charter. It had gained borough status by 1304, when it was recorded as having a population of 25 residents, as well as a church and a town mill on the River Ithon. Records of pontage indicate the existence of a toll bridge, probably at the site of the current-day footbridge. A deer park, probably located north of the castle, was also recorded in 1360. The presence of a manor at Cefnllys was highly unusual given the upland terrain, and reflect the efforts of the Mortimer lords to establish manorialism in Maelienydd in order to consolidate their rule in Maelienydd and increase the region's revenue.

The rule of English barons was resented by the region's Welsh population, and in 1297 a group of aggrieved locals travelled to London to present their complaints to King Edward I, who granted them an audience in front of the English Parliament. Subsequent letters from the king to Edmund Mortimer, 2nd Baron Mortimer forced Edmund to restore the traditional Welsh court at Cymaron, undermining attempts to strengthen the castle's manorial court. The authority of the Mortimer lords within Maelienydd was limited to the district surrounding the town and castle. In the place of rent, small amounts of tribute were taken from the Welsh community, as evidenced by accounts from 1356-7 which show that out of the cantref's gross income of £215, only £15 was extracted from the Welshry outside the shire of Dinieithon.

The town was ultimately short-lived: by 1332 the population had decreased to 20 citizens and it had further shrunk by 1383, when it is recorded as having only 10 burgesses. Its failure was probably due to a combination of factors, including recurrent outbreaks of plague across Britain in 1349, 1361–62 and 1369. The town's isolated position in the hilly, sparsely populated region of Mid Wales weakened its economic appeal, and Robert Rees Davies comments that the militarily advantageous location of the borough undermined its feasibility as a settlement: "the artificiality of [its] commercial setting was too obvious once the military opportunities ... had been removed". The constant threat of war within the Welsh Marches would have also contributed its decline.

Cefnllys remained a borough after the decline of the medieval settlement, although the borough eventually encompassed one-fifth of the parish. From the Laws in Wales Act 1542 until the Redistribution of Seats Act 1885, it was a classed as a contributory borough, jointly electing an MP to the Radnor Boroughs constituency in the English and British parliament with four other Radnorshire boroughs. In 1742, the landscape painter Thomas Jones was born at Cefnllys. In 1831, the population of the borough was 16 residents, in "three Farm Houses and one small Cottage".

== Location ==
The lack of visible remains has meant the town's location has not been conclusively proven. The population may have been small enough to fit within the enclosure of Castle Bank, a large ridge on which the Mortimer family built two 13th-century castles. Supporters of this interpretation emphasise the settlement's military role as a garrison town, and suggest that the stone wall surrounding the ridge enclosure would have formed part of the town defences. The more frequent explanation is that the settlement was concentrated around St Michael's Church, on low land next to the river, where there would have been easy access to the mill and a nearby spring. A series of earthworks surrounding the church represent raised causeways above boggy land, sunken roads in the direction of the toll bridge and probable medieval house platforms, as well as ridge and furrow patterns from open-field system agriculture. Archaeological finds surrounding the church have been mostly from the Tudor period or later, however. The church's structure is of 13th-century origin, although the date of its founding is unknown and it was heavily restored in 1895.
