= Cefn =

Cefn may refer to:

== Places ==
- Cefn (community), in Wrexham county borough, Wales
  - Cefn Mawr, a large village in the community of Cefn
- Cefn Cribwr, a village in Bridgend county borough, Wales
- Cefn Fault, a geological fault in Wales
- Cefn Glas, an area of Bridgend, Wales
- Cefnllys or Cefn Llys, an abandoned ghost village, formerly a medieval castle town and borough, near Llandrindod Wells, Powys
  - Cefnllys Castle

== Sport ==
- Cefn Druids A.F.C., a football club based in Cefn Mawr, playing in the Cymru Alliance.
- F.C. Cefn, a football club based in Cefn Mawr, playing in the Welsh National League (Wrexham Area) Premier Division

== Other uses ==
- Cefn quarry, a slate quarry near Cilgerran, Wales
