= Dinieithon =

Welsh medieval commote

- Maelienydd
- Shown within Rhwng Gwy a Hafren
- Capital: Cefnllys Castle
- Area
  - Coordinates: 52°15′21.2″N 3°20′24.7″W
- Historical era: Medieval
- Today part of: Powys, Wales

Dinieithon (Welsh for 'fort on the River Ieithon'; also known as Dineithon or Cefnllys) was a commote within the cantref of Maelienydd, in the medieval region of Rhwng Gwy a Hafren in Wales. It was situated near the modern town of Llandrindod Wells.

The southernmost of the four commotes in Maelienydd, it was also the most important due to its arable land and the presence of the region's administrative centre at Cefnllys. It bordered Gwrtheyrnion to the west and Elfael to the south.

Dinieithon was probably part of the Kingdom of Powys in the Early Middle Ages. In 1093, the Norman barons Roger de Montgomery, Ranulph de Mortimer, and Philip de Braose conquered the region, and Ralph Mortimer built a motte-and-bailey at Dinieithon to secure his new territory. The native Welsh made a recovery in the area, until Ralph Mortimer II built a masonry castle at Cefnllys, which subsequently became seat of the cantref.

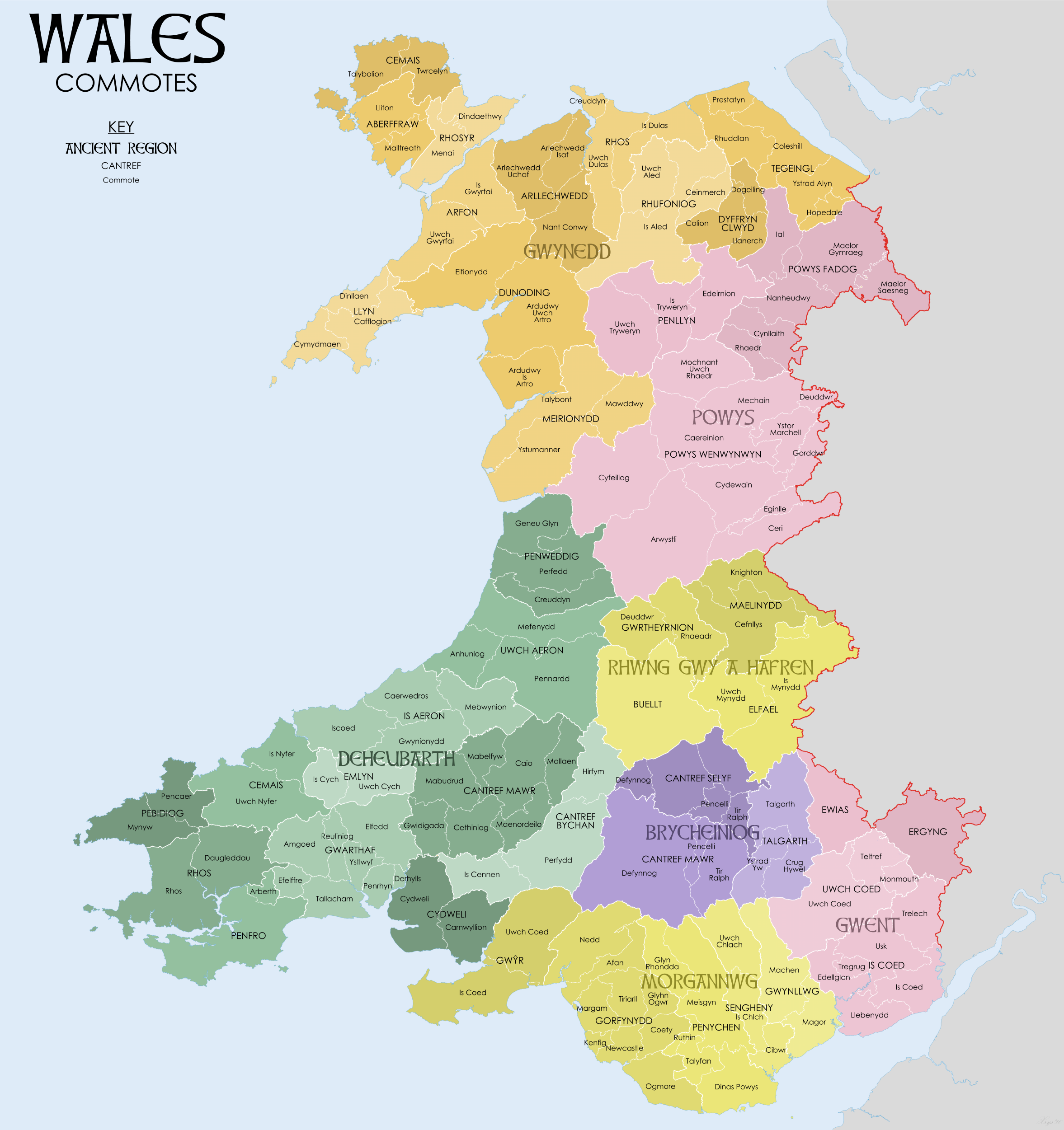
Map of commotes

Like the rest of Maelienydd, it became part of Radnorshire as part of the Laws in Wales Acts 1535–1542.

== See also ==
- Maelienydd
- Cefnllys Castle
