= Battle of Moel-y-don =

Battle fought in 1282 war during the conquest of Wales by Edward I

Date	6 November 1282
Location	Menai Strait 53.230°N 4.154°W
Result	Welsh victory

Belligerents
Wales	England

Commanders and leaders
Llywelyn ap Gruffudd	Luke de Tany †

Strength
Unknown	2,000 infantrymen 200 cavalrymen

Casualties and losses
Light	400+

The Battle of Moel-y-don was fought in 1282 as part of the conquest of Wales by Edward I. Also known as the Battle of the Bridge of Boats, it is unlikely the battle site was near Moel-y-don, but further north. The main sources for the battle include David Powel's 1584 Historie of Cambria, now called Wales.

== Background ==
Edward I of England had been aided in 1277 by many Welshmen, including Llywelyn's own brother Dafydd ap Gruffydd, but the terms of the peace, coupled with domination by English laws and by Edward's officials drove most of them into rebellion. The war began when Dafydd turned against the English and slaughtered the garrison of Hawarden Castle.

Edward raised several armies through levy and indenture, and sent them into Wales on multiple fronts to surround and destroy Llywelyn's armies. One important expedition, consisting of 2,000 infantrymen and 200 cavalrymen under the former constable of Gascony, Luke de Tany, was sent to capture the island of Anglesey. This would deprive the Welsh of much of their grain, and outflank the Welsh who were defending the Conwy.

== Battle ==
After successfully capturing Anglesey, Luke de Tany's men constructed a bridge of boats across the Menai Strait which separates Anglesey from the mainland. Edward's plan was to cross the River Conwy while Tany crossed the Menai and attacked from the north. However, Tany ignored the plan, believing he could defeat the Welsh without Edward's help. He contacted some of the clergy in Bangor, who had promised to aid him by giving a signal when the time was right to attack.

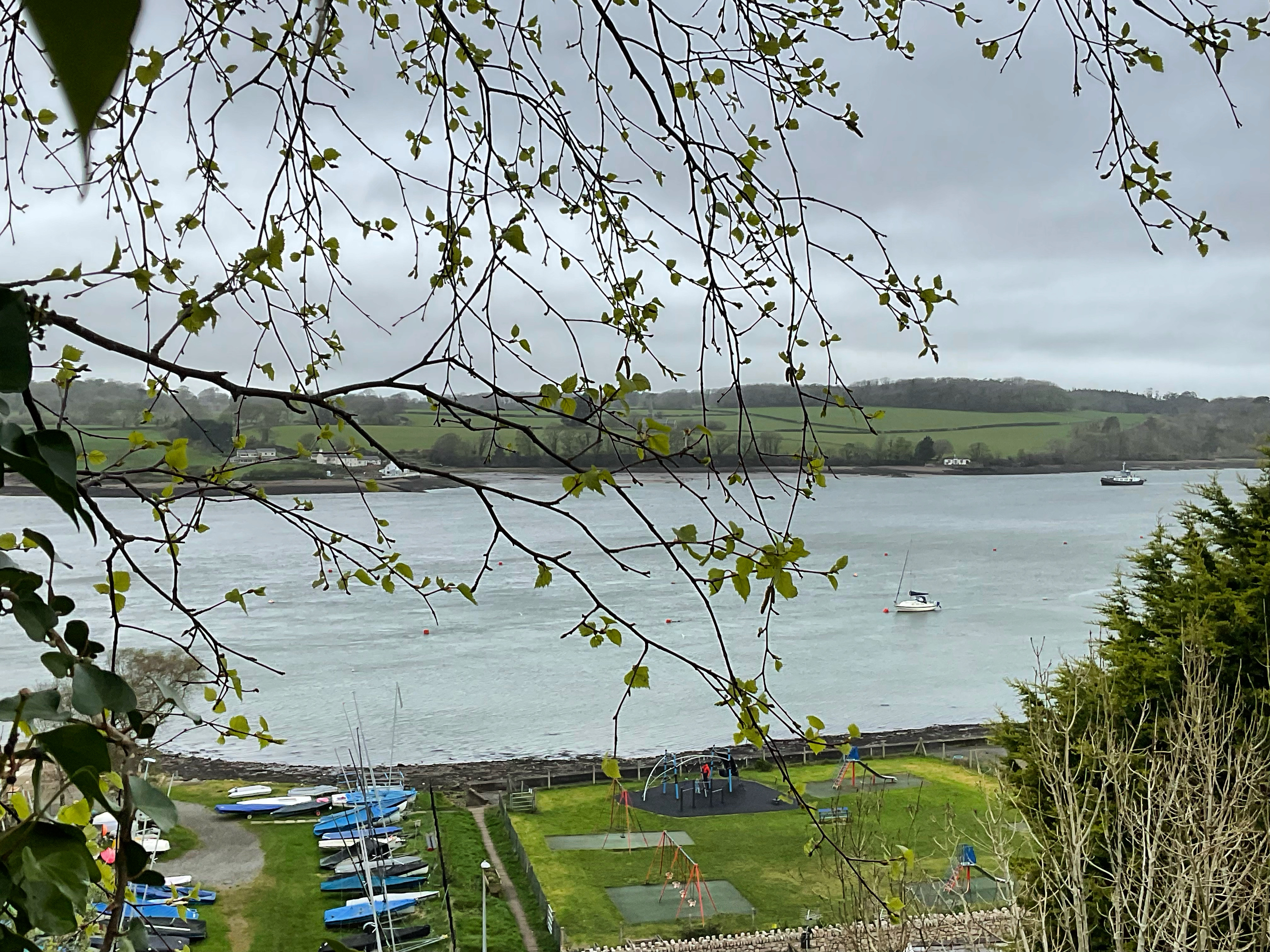
The Menai Straits at Moel y Don

The bridge was finished in September that year and, on 6 November, Tany and his men crossed the bridge, having been given the signal to attack. According to historical accounts, Llywelyn had scouts and lookouts monitoring the movements of the English forces. These scouts alerted Llywelyn when the English began crossing the bridge, and he emerged with a large army to meet the English as they crossed. A rising tide cut off de Tany's men from the bridge. When they tried to flee, many of them drowned when their heavy armour dragged them under the sea. Walter of Guisborough wrote an account of the battle:

When they had reached the foot of the mountain and, after a time, came to a place at some distance from the bridge, the tide came in with a great flow, so that they were unable to get back to the bridge for the debt of water. The Welsh came from the high mountains and attacked them, and in fear and trepidation, for the great number of the enemy, our men preferred to face the sea than the enemy. They went into the sea but, heavily laden with arms, they were instantly drowned.

Luke de Tany, the nobles Roger de Clifford, Phillip and William Burnell (brothers of the chancellor Robert Burnell), sixteen English knights (and their esquires) and over 400 of Tany's men perished. The Welsh suffered few casualties. The remaining English army made it back to Anglesey.

The Chester chronicler gave a full list of the knights who perished “Dominus Willelmus de Audethleye, Dominus Lucas de Taneiey, Dominus Ricardus de Wellis, Amari Burdet, Petrus de Lamare, Ph. Burnell, Willelmus Burnell, Henricus Tyeis, Howelus fil. Griffini, Roger de Clifford Junior, Willelmus de Lindeseye, Willelmus le Butiler, Thomas de Halton, Willelmus de Oudingishelys, Petrus de la Quarere and Walterus le Jaie.” The chronicler also suggested that future Justiciar of North Wales, Otto de Grandson, writing "with much difficulty Lord Othon de Grandson escaped".

== Aftermath ==
This victory, and the Battle of Llandeilo Fawr where another English army was destroyed in South Wales, temporarily delayed Edward's conquest of Gwynedd. However, Otto de Grandson and John de Vesci would within two months lead the English army with reinforcements from Gascony to complete the conquest of Gwynedd, after Llewleyn ap Gruffydd was killed at the Battle of Cilmeri in mid-Wales.
