= Conquest of Wales by Edward I =

English military campaigns, 1277–1283

Llywelyn and Edward
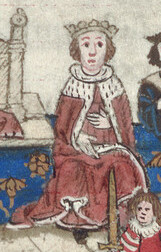
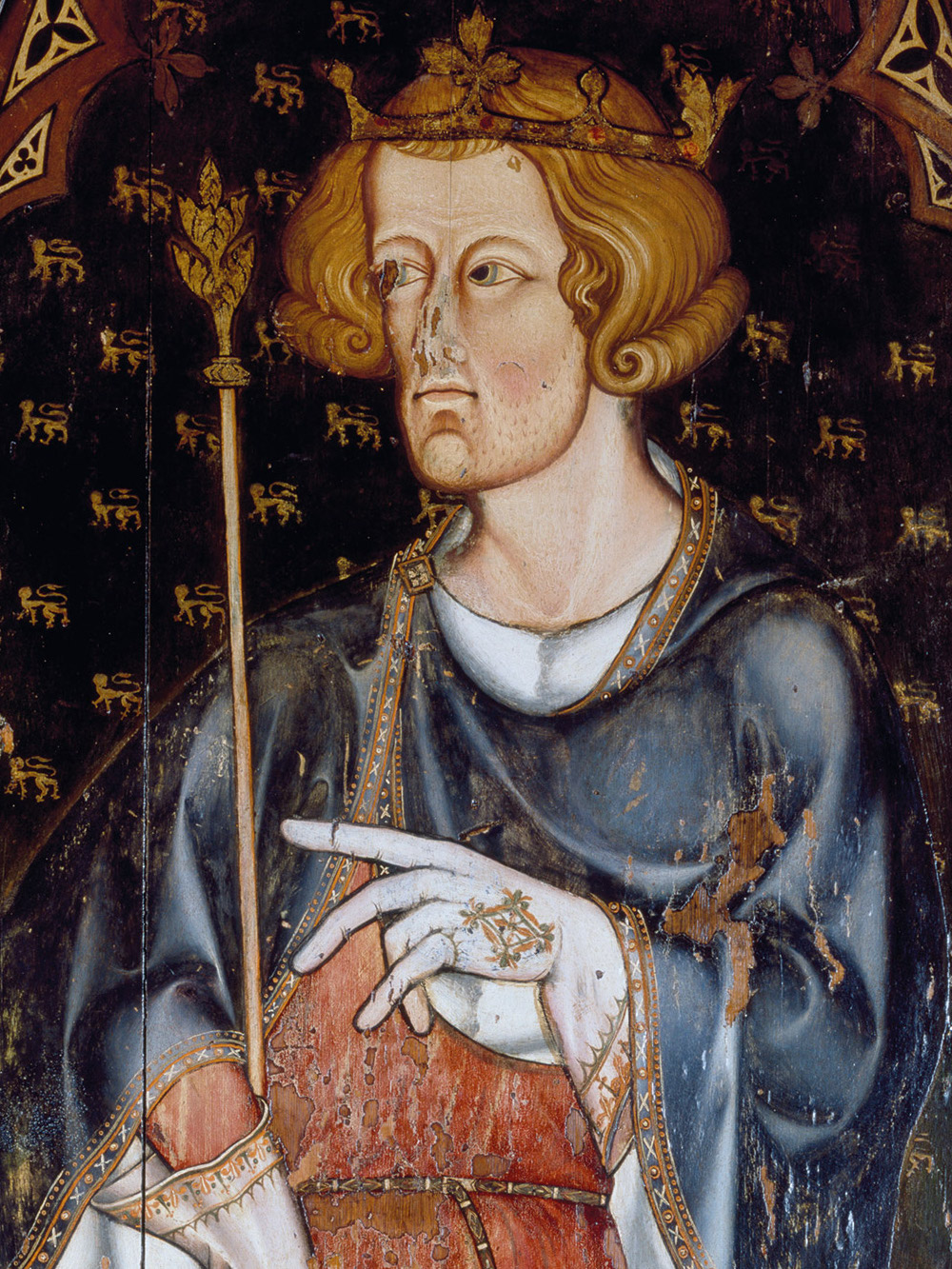
Llywelyn ap Gruffudd, Prince of Wales (left), and Edward I, King of England

The conquest of Wales by Edward I took place between 1277 and 1283. It is also known as the Edwardian conquest of Wales, (Note: Examples of historians using the term include Professor J. E. Lloyd, regarded as the founder of the modern academic study of Welsh history, in his History of Wales from the Earliest Times to the Edwardian Conquest, first published in 1911, and Professor R. R. Davies, the leading modern scholar of the period, in his works including The Age of Conquest: Wales, 1063–1415, published 2000.) to distinguish it from the earlier parial Norman invasion of Wales. In two campaigns, in 1277 and 1282–83, respectively, Edward I of England first greatly reduced the territory of Llywelyn ap Gruffudd ("Llywelyn the Last"), and then completely overran it, as well as the other remaining Welsh principalities.

By the 13th century, Wales was divided between native Welsh principalities and the territories of the Anglo-Norman Marcher lords. The leading principality was Gwynedd, whose princes had gained control of the greater part of the country, making the other remaining Welsh princes their vassals, and had taken the title Prince of Wales. Although kings of England had made several attempts to seize control of the native Welsh territories, it was not until Edward's war of conquest against Llywelyn, the last independent prince of Wales, that this was achieved on a lasting basis.

Most of the conquered territory was retained as a royal fief, and these lands later became, by custom, the territorial endowment of the heir to the English throne with the title Prince of Wales. The remainder would be granted to Edward's supporters as new Marcher lordships. Welsh supporters of the English king, such as ap Gwenwynwy, were also rewarded with their own land, albeit under feudal tenure. Royal land was organised under the Statute of Rhuddlan, divided into six shire counties, and incorporated into the new Principality of Wales.

Although the territories would not be effectively incorporated into the Kingdom of England until the Laws in Wales Acts 1535–1542, Edward's conquest marked the end of Welsh independence.

== Background: Wales in the High Middle Ages ==
Wales after the Treaty of Montgomery of 1267: Gwynedd, Llywelyn ap Gruffudd's principality Territories conquered by Llywelyn ap Gruffudd Territories of Llywelyn's vassals Lordships of the Marcher barons Lordships of the King of England Kingdom of England

Following a series of invasions beginning shortly after their conquest of England in 1066, the Normans seized much of Wales and established quasi-independent Marcher lordships, owing allegiance to the English crown. However, Welsh principalities such as Gwynedd, Powys and Deheubarth survived and from the end of the 11th century, the Welsh began pushing back the Norman advance. Over the following century the Welsh recovery fluctuated and the English kings, notably Henry II, several times sought to conquer or establish suzerainty over the native Welsh principalities. Nevertheless, by the end of the 12th century the Marcher lordships were reduced to the south and south-east of the country.

The principality of Gwynedd was the dominant power in Wales in the first half of the 13th century, with Powys and Deheubarth becoming tributary states. Gwynedd's princes now assumed the title "Prince of Wales". But war with England in 1241 and 1245, followed by a dynastic dispute in the succession to the throne, weakened Gwynedd and allowed Henry III to seize Perfeddwlad (also known as the "Four Cantrefs", the eastern part of the principality). However, from 1256 a resurgent Gwynedd under Llywelyn ap Gruffudd (who became known as "Llywelyn the Last") resumed the war with Henry and took back Perfeddwlad. By the Treaty of Montgomery of 1267, peace was restored and, in return for doing homage to the English king, Llywelyn was recognised as Prince of Wales and his re-conquest of Perfeddwlad was accepted by Henry. However, sporadic warfare between Llywelyn and some of the Marcher Lords, such as Gilbert de Clare, Roger Mortimer and Humphrey de Bohun continued.

== Conquest ==
=== Immediate causes of war ===
Henry III died in 1272 and was succeeded by his son, Edward I. Whereas Henry's ineffectiveness had led to the collapse of royal authority in England during his reign, Edward was a vigorous and forceful ruler and an able military leader.

In 1274, tension between Llywelyn and Edward increased when Gruffydd ap Gwenwynwyn of Powys and Llywelyn's younger brother Dafydd ap Gruffydd defected to the English and sought Edward's protection. The continuing conflict with the Marcher Lords, particularly over Roger Mortimer's new castle at Cefnllys, and Edward's harbouring of defectors led Llewelyn to refuse Edward's demand to come to Chester in 1275 to do homage to him, as required by the Treaty of Montgomery. For Edward, a further provocation came from Llywelyn's planned marriage to Eleanor, daughter of Simon de Montfort, the leader of a rebellion against the crown during the reign of Edward's father. In November 1276, Edward declared war on Llywelyn. However, his objective was to put down a recalcitrant vassal rather than to begin a war of conquest.

=== Invasion of 1277 ===
Early in 1277, before the main royal army had been mustered, Edward deployed, in south and mid-Wales, a mixture of forces comprising paid troops, some of the marcher lords' retainers and knights of the royal household. They met with considerable success as many of the native Welsh rulers, resentful of Llywelyn's overlordship, surrendered and joined the English. In July 1277, Edward launched a punitive expedition into North Wales with his own army of 15,500—of whom 9,000 were Welshmen from the south—raised through a traditional feudal summons. From Chester the army marched into Gwynedd, camping first at Flint and then Rhuddlan and Deganwy, most likely causing significant damage to the areas it advanced through. A fleet from the Cinque ports provided naval support.

Llywelyn soon realised his position was hopeless and quickly surrendered. The campaign never came to a major battle. However, Edward decided to negotiate a settlement rather than attempt total conquest. It may be that he was running short of men and supplies by November 1277 and, in any case, complete conquest of Llywelyn's territories had not been his objective.

=== Treaty of Aberconwy ===
Gwynedd after the Treaty of Aberconwy 1277: Gwynedd, Llywelyn ap Gruffudd's principality Territories of Dafydd ap Gruffudd Territories ceded to the English Crown

By the Treaty of Aberconwy in November 1277, Llywelyn was left only with the western part of Gwynedd, though he was allowed to retain the title of Prince of Wales. Eastern Gwynedd was split between Edward and Llywelyn's brother Dafydd, with the remainder of the lands that had been tributary to him becoming effectively Edward's.

As a result of both territorial expropriation and the submission of the ruling families, Deheubarth, Powys and mid-Wales became a mixture of directly controlled royal land and pliant English protectorates. Edward's victory was comprehensive and it represented a major redistribution of power and territory in Wales in Edward's favour. Edward now enjoyed a degree of direct control in the native Welsh areas which no previous English king had achieved.

=== Campaign of 1282–83 ===
War broke out again in 1282, as a result of a rebellion by Llywelyn's brother Dafydd, who was discontented with the reward he had received from Edward in 1277. Dafydd launched a series of attacks co-ordinated with the Welsh rulers in Deheubarth and North Powys, who had been Llywelyn's vassals until 1277 and were now Edward's vassals. Llywelyn and the other Welsh leaders, including those in the south, joined in and it soon assumed a very different character from the 1277 campaign. It became a national struggle enjoying wide support among the Welsh, who were provoked particularly by Edward's attempts to impose English law on the Welsh. Edward, however, soon began to see it as a war of conquest rather than just a punitive expedition to put down a rebellion.

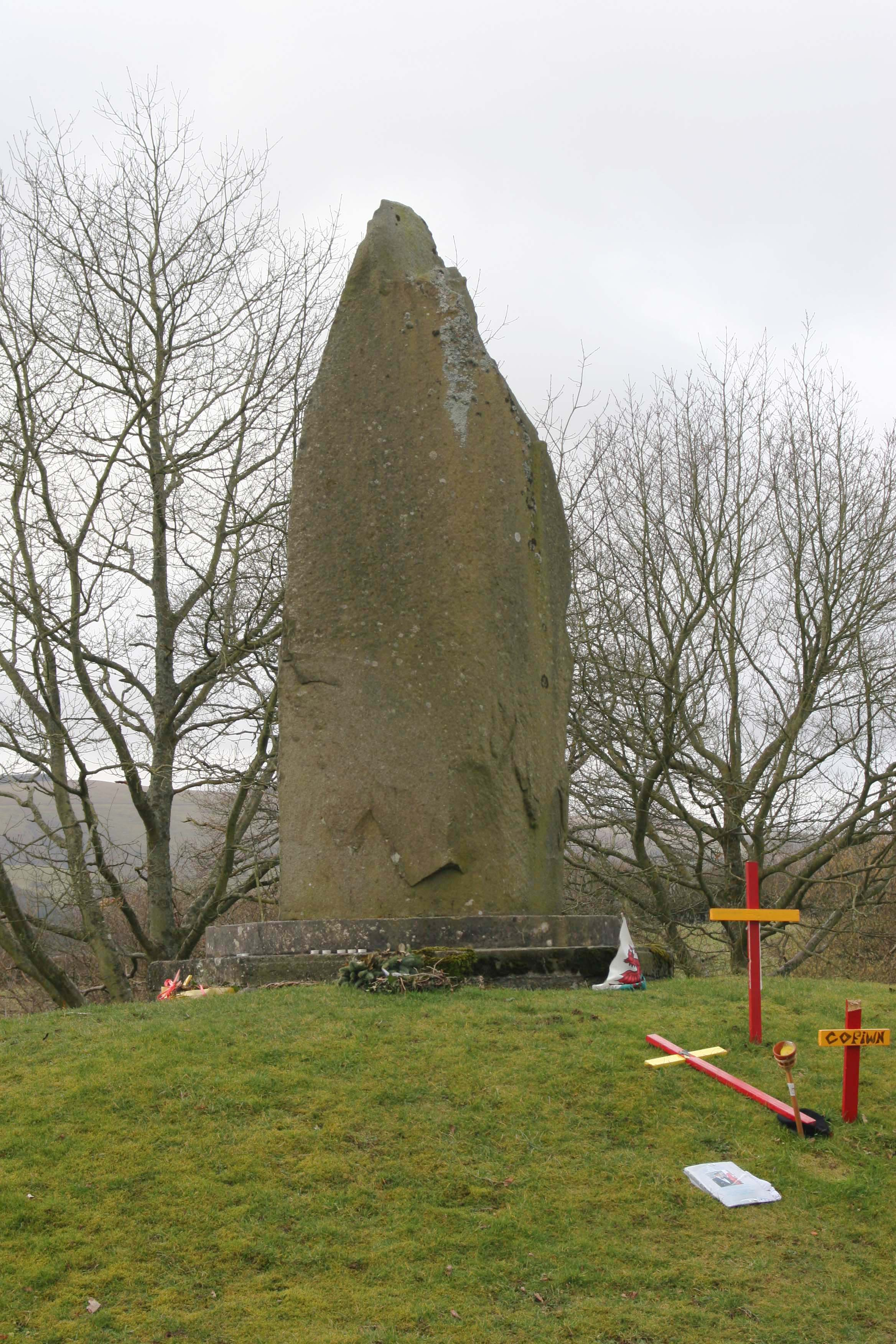
The Llywelyn Monument at Cilmeri which marks the site of the Battle of Orewin Bridge

The English launched a three-pronged attack, with Edward leading his army into North Wales along much the same route as in 1277, Roger Mortimer operating in mid-Wales and the Earl of Gloucester advancing with a substantial army in the south. Initially the Welsh were successful. In June 1282, Gloucester was defeated at the Battle of Llandeilo Fawr. Edward replaced him with William de Valence, Earl of Pembroke who raided in the south as far as Aberystwyth but failed to engage with a Welsh army. Edward then suffered a set-back in mid-Wales when his commander there, Roger Mortimer, died in October. On 6 November, while John Peckham, Archbishop of Canterbury, was conducting peace negotiations, Luke de Tany, Edward's commander in Anglesey, decided to carry out a surprise attack. Shortly after Tany and his men had crossed over a pontoon bridge they had built to the mainland, they were ambushed by the Welsh and suffered heavy losses at the Battle of Moel-y-don.

However, the war turned in Edward's favour when Llywelyn unexpectedly marched out of North Wales towards Builth in mid-Wales. He was lured into a trap and killed at the Battle of Orewin Bridge on 11 December 1282. Taking advantage of this fortuitous event, Edward raised a new army and boldly marched into Snowdonia in January 1283 and captured Dolwyddelan Castle in the heartland of the Welsh resistance. At the same time de Valence in the south advanced from Cardigan into Meirionnydd. The combination of de Valence's pressure from the south and the king's advance into the north was too much for the Welsh forces. The conquest of Gwynedd was completed with the capture in June 1283 of Dafydd, who had succeeded his brother as prince the previous December. Dafydd was taken to Shrewsbury and executed as a traitor the following autumn.

== Aftermath ==
Royal lands after the conquest: "Principality of North Wales" (Note: The counties of Anglesey, Merionethshire, Caernarfonshire were referred to, erroneously, as the "Principality of North Wales", which had its own administration under the Justiciar of North Wales. See Cannon, John, ed. (2009). Oxford Dictionary of British History. OUP Oxford. p. 661. ISBN 978-0-19-955037-1.) Other direct rule lands March of Wales Marcher lordships

=== Territorial settlement ===
Edward divided the territory of the Welsh principalities between himself (that is, retained under direct royal control) and his supporters through feudal grants, which in practice became new Marcher lordships. The lordships created were mainly grants to Anglo-Normans such as the Earl of Lincoln who received the lordship of Denbigh. But additionally, Edward's Welsh allies received back their own lands, but on a feudal basis; for instance, Owain ap Gruffydd ap Gwenwynwyn, of the princely house of Powys Wenwynwyn, received his ancestral lands as the lordship of Powys and became known as Owen de la Pole (or "Poole").

Lands retained under direct royal control were organised under the Statute of Rhuddlan of 1284, which declared that they were "annexed and united" to the English crown, although they did not become part of the Kingdom of England. They were the King's personal fief and in 1301, they were bestowed on Edward's son, Edward of Caernarfon (the future Edward II), with the title "Prince of Wales" and thereafter the lands and title became the customary endowment of the heir to the throne.

The Statute of Rhuddlan divided the territory under royal control into six shire counties on the English model, administered by royal officials. The Statute also enforced the adoption of English common law in Wales, albeit with some local variation. Welsh law continued to be used in some civil cases such as land inheritance, though with changes; for example, illegitimate sons could no longer claim part of the inheritance, which Welsh law had allowed them to do.

The rest of Wales continued to be constituted as the March of Wales under the rule of Marcher Lords, as before, from the 1290s Edward began intervening in the affairs of the March to a much greater extent.

=== Colonisation and castle building ===
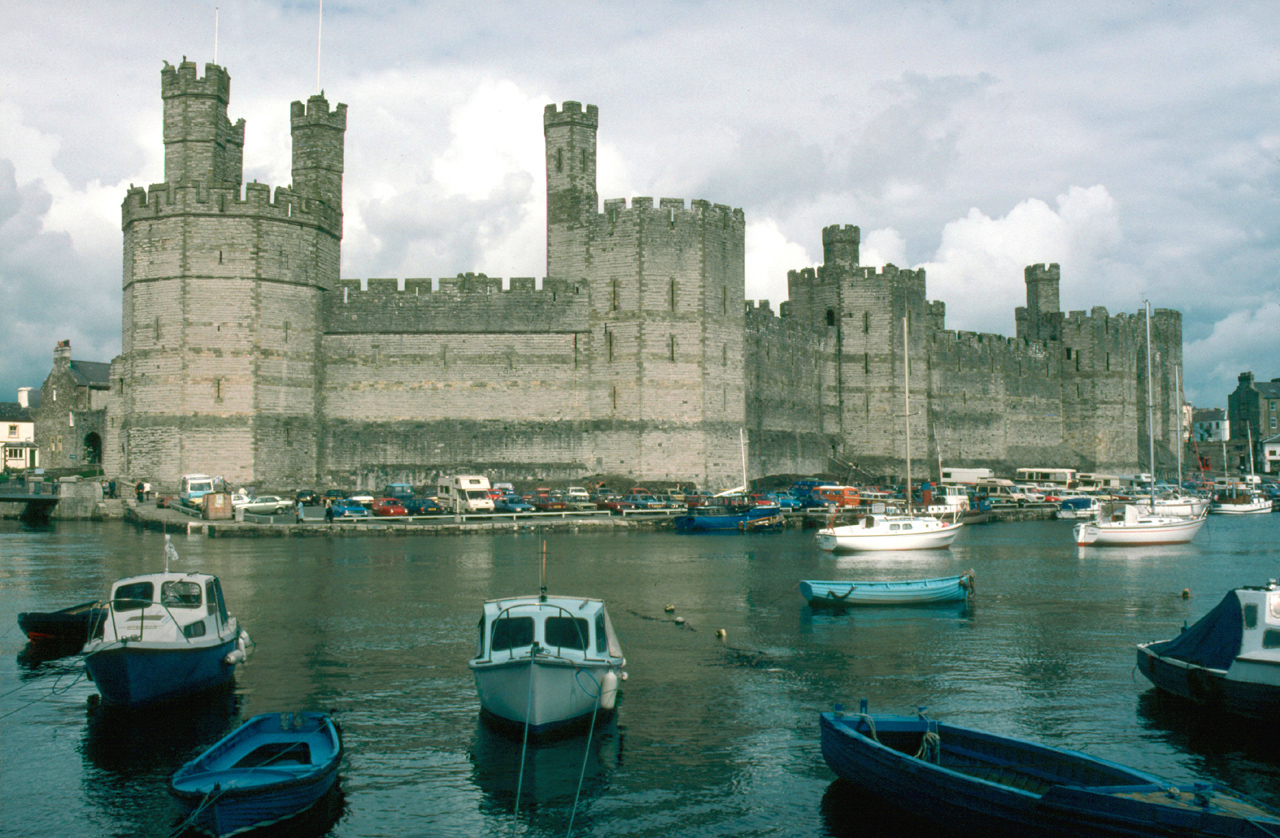
Caernarfon Castle, the "capital" of English rule in North Wales for two centuries after the conquest

From 1277, and particularly after 1283, Edward embarked on a policy of English colonisation and settlement of Wales, creating new towns like Flint, Aberystwyth and Rhuddlan. Outside of the towns, Welsh peasants were evicted from key areas and their land resettled by English peasants: for example, in the Lordship of Denbigh 10,000 acres were occupied by English settlers by 1334.

Edward's main concern following his victory was to ensure the military security of his new territories and the stone castle was to be the primary means for achieving this. Under the supervision of James of Saint George, Edward's master-builder, a series of imposing castles were built, using a distinctive design and the most advanced defensive features of the day, to form a "ring of stone" around north Wales. Among the major buildings were the castles of Beaumaris, Caernarfon, Conwy and Harlech.

For generations, sheriffs in Wales in charge of "administering royal law" were mostly English. Some Welsh laws were kept, but the remaining Welsh legal code could be superseded by an English noble official or the use of English law.

=== Further rebellions ===
Rebellions continued to occur in Wales sporadically. These included revolts in 1287–88, and more seriously, in 1294 under Madog ap Llywelyn, a distant relative of Llywelyn ap Gruffudd and in 1316–1318 by Llywelyn Bren, Lord of Senghenydd. In the 1370s, Owain Lawgoch the last representative in the male line of the ruling house of Gwynedd planned two invasions of Wales with French support. In 1400, a Welsh nobleman, Owain Glyndŵr, led the most serious revolt against English rule. None of these rebellions succeeded and by the Laws in Wales Acts 1535–1542 Wales was effectively incorporated into the Kingdom of England.

=== Consequences for England ===
There was an unforeseen constitutional impact for England. The financial cost of the conquest was heavy. Including the construction of the new castles, Edward spent around £173,000 to achieve it. (In comparison, Edward's annual revenue at this time averaged around £40,000.) Additionally, the exchequer had to bear the cost of the ongoing military presence in Wales, including maintenance of the castles. The king's financial need contributed to the extension of the role and membership of the English Parliament as taxes were needed to be raised in consequence.

== Bibliography ==
- Carpenter, David (2003). The Struggle for Mastery: Britain, 1066–1284. Oxford: Oxford University Press. ISBN 978-0-19-522000-1.
- Davies, R. R. (2000). The Age of Conquest: Wales, 1063–1415. Oxford: Oxford University Press. ISBN 978-0-19-820878-5.
- Moore, David (2005). The Welsh wars of independence: c. 410 – c. 1415 (new ed.). Tempus. ISBN 978-0-7524-3321-9.
- Morris, Marc (2008). A Great and Terrible King: Edward I and the Forging of Britain (updated ed.). London: Hutchinson. ISBN 978-0-09-179684-6.
- Morris, John E. (1901). The Welsh Wars of Edward I. a Contribution to Mediaeval Military History, Based on Original Documents. Oxford, UK: Clarendon Press. OCLC 562375464.
- Powicke, F. M. (1970) [1962]. The Thirteenth Century: 1216–1307 (2nd ed.). Oxford: Clarendon Press. ISBN 978-0-19-821708-4.
- Prestwich, Michael (1997). Edward I (updated ed.). New Haven: Yale University Press. ISBN 978-0-300-07209-9.
- Prestwich, Michael (2007). Plantagenet England: 1225–1360 (new ed.). Oxford: Oxford University Press. ISBN 978-0-19-822844-8.
