= Luke de Tany =

English noble

- Arms of Luke de Tany: Azure, three bars argent.
- Died: 1282

Luke de Tany (died 6 November 1282) was an English noble. He was once the Seneschal of Gascony and Constable of Tickhill Castle and Knaresborough Castle. He served Edward I during his conquest of Wales by successfully capturing Anglesey in 1282. From Anglesey, de Tany sent a strong force over the Menai Strait where they were defeated at the Battle of Moel-y-don.

== Life ==
Towards the end of the Second Barons' War in England, Tany was a loyal follower of King Henry III. He served as Royal Constable of Tickhill and Knaresborough Castles. He executed several captured baronial rebels after a brief judicial process. In 1270 he took part in the Crusade of Prince Edward. During the Crusade he served as admiral of the fleet.

During the return journey from the Crusade, Tany travelled with Edward to Gascony in 1273. Whilst in Gascony, he was appointed to the office of Seneschal of Gascony. He was already Mayor of the town of Lalinde since 1267. His aggressive policies in Gascony led to many complaints, including a quarrel with Gaston of Béarn and the city of Bazas, where two of Tany's militiamen were killed in February 1274. Tany left in mid 1274 and returned to England. In 1278, Edward I sent two confidants, Otton de Grandson and Robert Burnell, to Gascony to investigate the charges against him. The investigation, which took place between May and September 1278, found that although Tany's rule was severe, he was not to be blamed for failure or corruption. He was replaced by Jean I de Grailly, as Seneschal of Gascony.

During Edward's second campaign against Wales, Tany was appointed on 18 August 1282 commander of the English troops at Anglesey. He planned to lead an English army via a boat bridge over the Menai Strait to Gwynedd, in an attempt to form a second front at the back of the Welsh. On 6 November, Tany and his army crossed over the boat bridge, however they were attacked by the Welsh on the opposite side. In the ensuing battle of the Menai Strait, the English forces were driven back across the bridge. The boat bridge was destroyed leaving more than 300 killed or drowned, including Tany.
