= Cefnllys Castle =

Medieval castle in Powys, Wales

- Castell Cefn-llys
- Powys, Wales; Near Llandrindod Wells
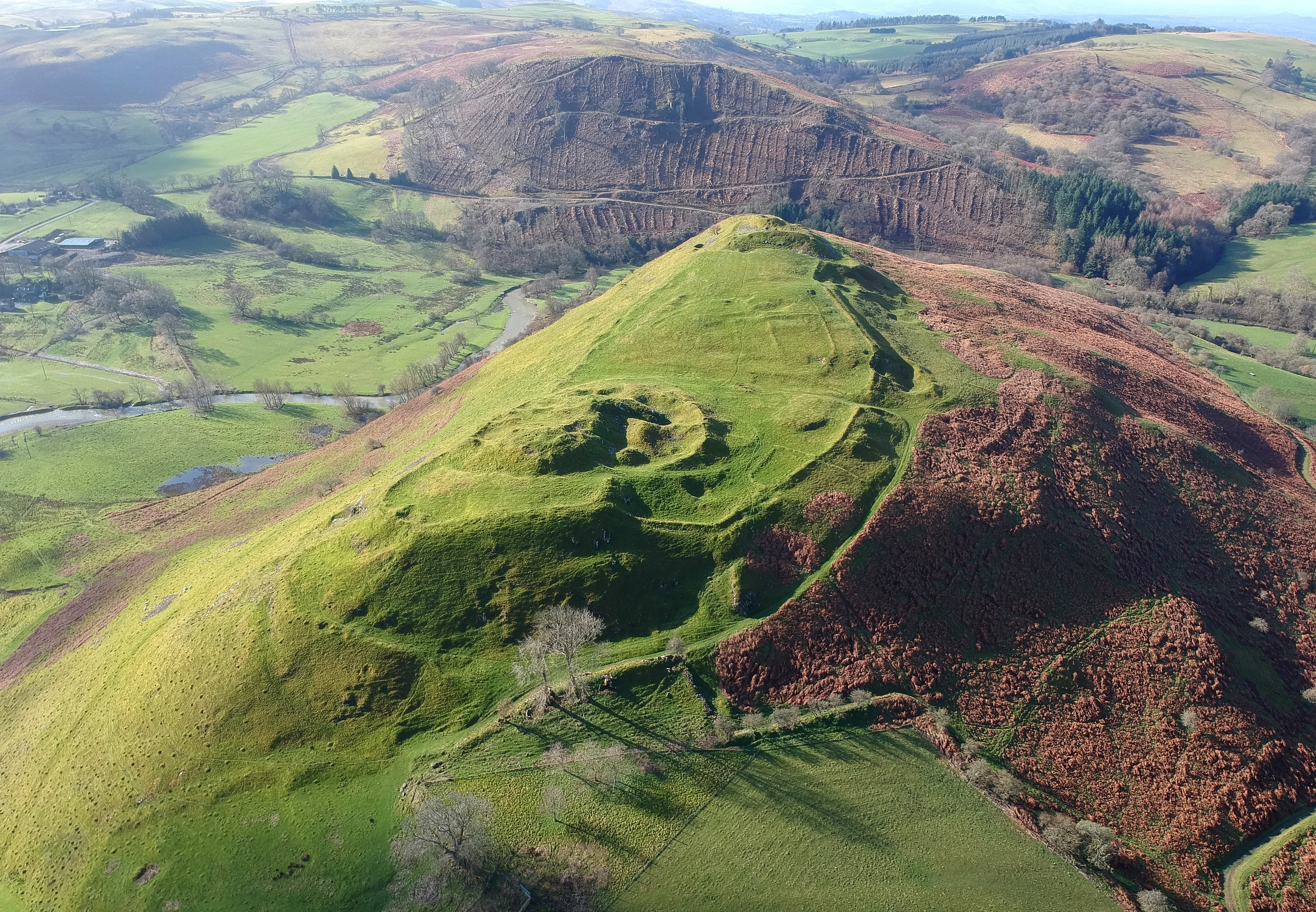
- Castle Bank from the north

Site information
- Type: Spur castle
- Open to the public: Yes
- Condition: Ruined

Location
- Location with Wales
- Coordinates: 52.2438°N 3.3353°W
- Height: 304 metres (997 ft) above sea level

Site history
- Built: c. 1093–95 (motte-and-bailey castle) c. 1242 (first masonry castle); 1273–74 (second masonry castle)
- Battles/wars: Norman invasion of Wales (1067–1100s); Anglo-Welsh war (1256–67); Revolt of Madog ap Llywelyn (1294–95); Revolt of Owain Glyndŵr (1400–15)

Scheduled monument
- Official name: Cefnllys Castle; Old Castle Mound; Cefnllys Medieval Settlement
- Reference no.: RD008; RD077; RD150

Listed Building – Grade II
- Official name: Church of St Michael
- Designated: 12 December 1952
- Reference no.: 9301

Cefnllys Castle (Welsh: Castell Cefn-llys, pronounced [ˈkastɛɬ kɛvn ɬɨːs]) was a medieval spur castle in Radnorshire (now part of Powys), Wales. Two successive masonry castles were built on a ridge above the River Ithon known as Castle Bank (Welsh: Craig y Castell, lit. 'castle rock') in the thirteenth century, replacing a wooden motte-and-bailey castle constructed by the Normans nearby. Controlling several communication routes into the highlands of Mid Wales, the castles were strategically important within the Welsh Marches during the High Middle Ages. As the seat of the fiercely contested lordship and cantref of Maelienydd, Cefnllys became a source of friction between Llywelyn ap Gruffudd and Roger Mortimer in the prelude to Edward I's conquest of Wales (1277–1283). Cefnllys was also the site of a borough and medieval town.

Castle Bank is often considered to be the site of an Iron Age hillfort, but there is no firm evidence to corroborate this. It has also been speculated that the princely court of a native Welsh ruler was situated nearby. The first castle at Cefnllys, 1 mile (1.6 km) north of the ridge, was a motte-and-bailey thrown up during the early stages of the Norman invasion of Wales by the Anglo-Norman baron Ralph Mortimer, beginning a long association between the powerful Mortimer family and Cefnllys. Around 1242, after a century of prolonged conflict in the region, Ralph Mortimer II built a masonry castle on the north-east flank of Castle Bank, which quickly became the principal symbol of Mortimer hegemony in Wales. The castle was captured and slighted in 1262 by Llywelyn ap Gruffudd, Prince of Wales and Gwynedd, during a war with Henry III of England, and Cefnllys featured prominently in the ensuing Treaty of Montgomery. The construction of a new castle on the south-east side of the hill by Roger Mortimer was a contributing factor to Llywelyn's refusal to swear fealty to Edward I in 1275, leading to war in 1277.

The castle may have been sacked during the revolts of Madog ap Llywelyn (1294–1295) and Owain Glyndŵr (1400–1415), but remained occupied until at least the mid-15th century, when it was described in a series of poems by the bard Lewys Glyn Cothi. Both castles on Castle Bank are now entirely ruinous and only traces remain; the sole surviving medieval structure at Cefnllys is St Michael's Church. The town was unsuccessful and disappeared altogether as a result of the Black Death and subsequent bubonic plague outbreaks, economic remoteness and changing frontier military conditions, although Cefnllys retained its borough status until the 19th century.

== Etymology ==
Cefnllys derives from the Welsh words cefn, meaning 'ridge', and llys, meaning 'mansion' or 'court'. Llys is associated with the unfortified courts of medieval Welsh rulers and may refer to the administrative manor (maerdref) of a local lord. The name is first mentioned in 1246 as Keventhles and the form Kevenlleece, standard in the 19th century, is recorded by 1679. (Note: Andrew Breeze argues that Cefnllys is "Mons Clece", a place-name in Wales shown on the Hereford Mappa Mundi. He points to Cefnllys' etymology and historical role as "the Mortimer stronghold protecting Hereford from attack" as evidence to support this.) Another name for the settlement and parish, Llanfihangel Cefn-llys ("church of St Michael at Cefnllys"), appears in records c. 1566 and refers to the medieval church which still stands.

An older name, Dinieithon (also Dineithon and Castell Glan Iethon), meaning "fort on the River Ieithon" (din being Old Welsh for 'fort', cognate with dun), is also related to fortifications at Cefnllys – particularly the earlier Norman castle, which is sometimes called "Cefnllys Old Castle". Dinieithon or Swydd Diniethon ("shire of Dinieithon") was the name of the commote within the cantref (hundred) of Maelienydd.

== Location ==
The isolated ridge of Castle Bank is located 1.7 miles (2.7 km) east of the modern town of Llandrindod Wells, Powys. It occupies a key position at the junction of several tributary valleys of the River Ithon, granting commanding views over an important communication corridor into central Wales. Cefnllys was caput (administrative centre) of Maelienydd, part of the Welsh region of Rhwng Gwy a Hafren (English: Between Wye and Severn). As the English Marcher lords expanded their control westward, Maelienydd formed a core part of the turbulent area known as the middle march, together with Gwrtheyrnion and Elfael. The castle was viewed as a forward defence against Welsh incursions by towns along the English border, particularly Hereford.

== Description ==
Earlier (north-east) castle

1 / Keep; 2 / Inner bailey	3 / Outer bailey; 4 / Possible gatehouse

Later (south-west) castle

5	Round tower
6	Square walled enclosure
7	Large rock-cut ditch

8	Possible south-west bailey
9	Possible north bailey

Other features

10 / Probable site of 15th century hall; 11 / Hollow-way entrance	12 / Approaching path; 13 / Later cultivation

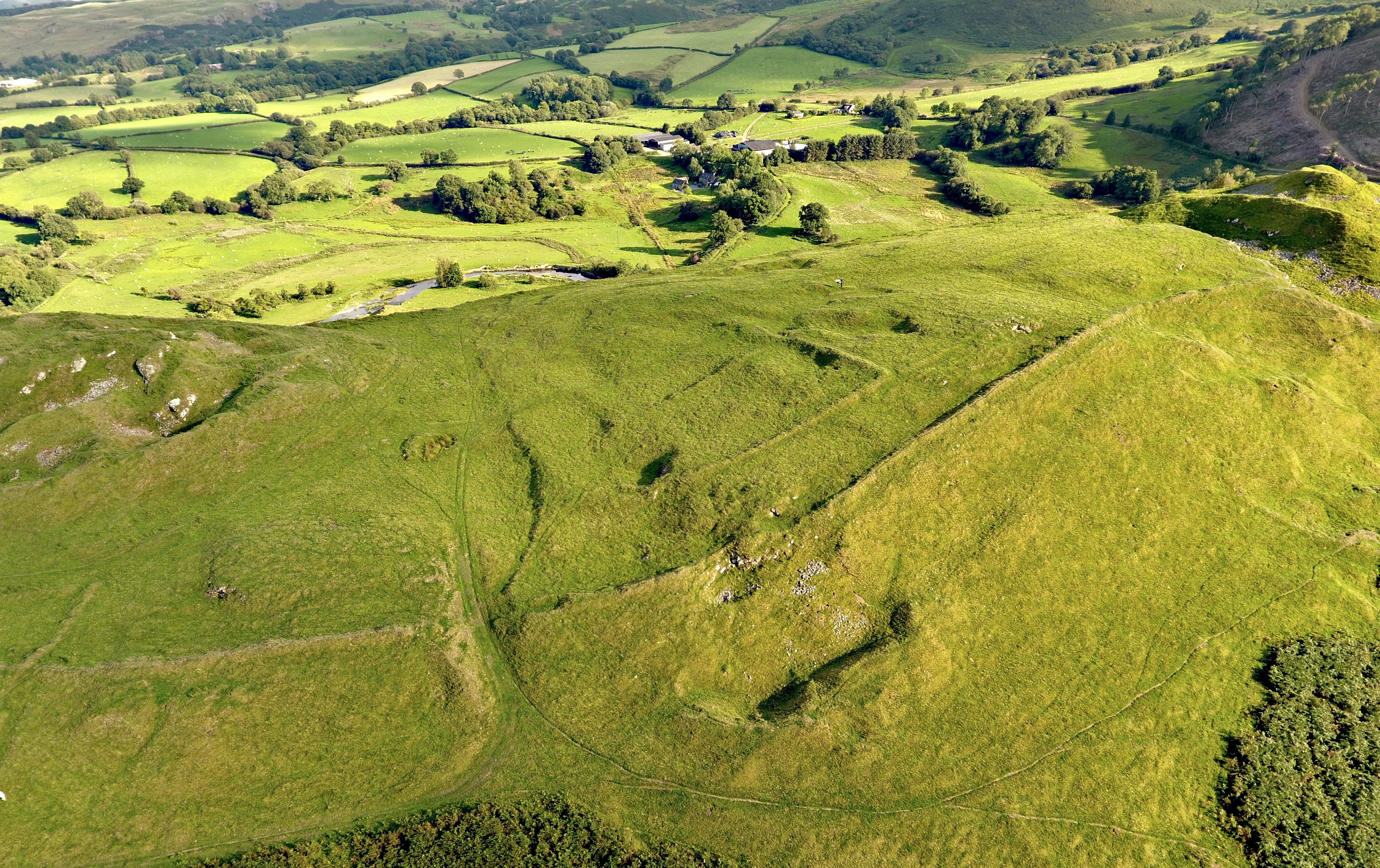
Overview showing the earlier castle (centre-left) and later castle (top-right)

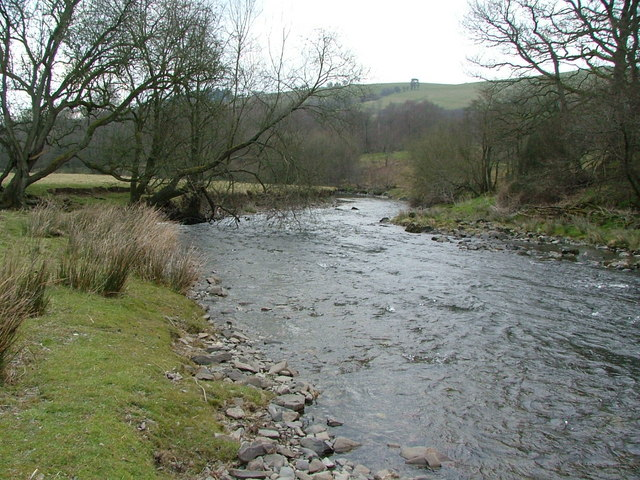
The River Ithon near Cefnllys

Castle Bank is a naturally defensible position, protected on three sides by a loop of the River Ithon. The hill is open access land, and the highest point is 304 metres (997 ft) above sea level. The mottes of two castles are situated at opposite ends of the hill, the ruins heavily deformed and mostly rubble; only their basic characteristics have been identified. The earlier northern castle consisted of a keep within an elevated triangular inner bailey, with an accompanying outer bailey which may have been entered via a gatehouse at its north-east corner. The main feature of the later southern castle was a circular (or octagonal) tower inside a walled court, (Note: Across Wales during the 13th century, round towers increasingly supplanted the less advanced rectangular keep, and the tower at Cefnllys is generally assumed to fit this pattern given the rubble's circular outline. Lewys Glyn Cothi's description of the castle as "eight-sided" has led some scholars to suggest that the tower may have had an unusual octagonal shape. The Cadw scheduling report notes that the tower's walls are likely to survive to a height of several metres below the rubble.) separated from the main part of the ridge by a deep rock-cut ditch. There was probably a small bailey to the south-west, and a scarp across the main ridge suggests the southern half of Castle Bank may have formed a large north bailey. The outline of a building in this area is likely to be the oak hall recorded at Cefnllys in the 15th century. A stone curtain wall and rampart extended along most of the hilltop rim.

St Michael's Church sits at the foot of the hill next to the Ithon, 300 metres (980 ft) to the west. Earthworks surrounding the church are commonly supposed to be the remains of the medieval town. Alternatively, several historians infer that the primary settlement may have been sited within the enclosure of Castle Bank, adjacent to the castles. During the borough's later history, the population may have been dispersed along the valley, instead of being focused in a nucleated settlement. The Norman motte-and-bailey castle was located on the bank of the Ithon further upstream, 1 mile (1.6 km) north of Castle Bank.

== History ==
No archaeological excavation has been undertaken at Cefnllys – modern understanding of the site's history rests on contemporary texts. Prior to the 14th century, sources are limited to accounts of military campaigns and the castles are referenced in the Welsh chronicles Brut y Tywysogion and Annales Cambriae. Greater stability following Edward I's conquest of Wales resulted in a growth of documentary evidence in the Welsh Marches, though at Cefnllys this is largely restricted to rudimentary public records as the majority of the Mortimer estate archives have been lost. An extensive topographical survey combined with photogrammetry was carried out at Castle Bank in 1985 by the Royal Commission on the Ancient and Historical Monuments of Wales (RCAHMW), with a follow-up appraisal in 2006.

=== Hillfort origins ===
A number of scholars have suggested that the medieval castles utilised the remains of an Iron Age hillfort. Indications of a pre-Roman provenance include the ridge's large, elongated enclosure of 10 hectares (25 acres), interpretation of visible earthworks and the extensive use of scarping and ditching to artificially steepen the gradient of slopes surrounding the hilltop. The archaeologist A. E. Brown tentatively linked the entrance hollow-way with this period, and the banks encircling the hilltop could also have an Iron Age origin. Other features previously posited as pre-Roman were determined to be medieval by the 2006 RCAHMW report, although it did not rule out the possibility of a hillfort. The complexity of earthworks on Castle Bank is compounded by alterations caused by later agricultural use and quarrying, making confident assessment difficult. Among recent archaeological studies, Chris Martin & Robert Silvester (2011) state that the large bailey's Iron Age origins have been "convincingly argued", while Robert Scourfield & Richard Haslam (2013) surmise, on the basis of the RCAHMW report, that "the hill is no longer considered as having been first fortified in the Iron Age".

=== Initial medieval activity ===
Cefnllys is connected in tradition with Elystan Glodrydd, a 10th-century prince of Buellt and founder of the regional Welsh dynasty. (Note: According to the 16th-century writer Siôn Dafydd Rhys (in Llanstephan MS. 56), Cefnllys was one of a number of sites in the region fortified by Glodrydd.) The court of a Welsh ruler is assumed to have been sited nearby, but the time period, duration and precise location of such a llys are unresolved. In a Clwyd-Powys Archaeological Trust report for Cadw, Robert Silvester observed that the motte-and-bailey north of Castle Bank is considered a probable site, granting that a llys in this setting is more likely to have superseded the Norman castle than predated it, and no physical traces have been found. A silver thumb-ring recovered on Castle Bank may date from an early medieval period of Welsh occupation, and the circular graveyard ringed by yew trees could denote a pre-Norman origin of St Michael's Church. However, there is no substantive archaeological or written evidence to support any of these claims.

The timber motte-and-bailey north of Castle Bank is assumed to be the work of Ralph Mortimer of Wigmore. One of a group of Norman barons who overran the region in 1093, Ralph is credited with the construction of a castle in Maelienydd named "Dynyetha", probably between 1093 and 1095. After his death c. 1104, the area was retaken by the Welsh and remained a disputed territory throughout the 12th century. Dinieithon was last documented in 1179, but was not described as a castle, suggesting that it had been destroyed, abandoned or possibly reused as a llys. English control was still far from secure when Llywelyn the Great, ruler of the ascendant Welsh state of Gwynedd, established his authority over southern Powys between 1208 and 1216, acting as protector and suzerain of the local Welsh dynasty. The historian Paul Remfry has speculated that the northern castle at Castle Bank may have been started in the period 1216–1234 under Llywelyn's direction, although it is generally considered to be a Mortimer creation.

=== First masonry castle ===
The death of Llywelyn in April 1240 led to an internal power struggle within Gwynedd, presenting Ralph Mortimer II with an opportunity to strengthen his position in Maelienydd. By the end of Henry III's Welsh campaign of August 1241, Ralph was in full control of the cantref and had secured submissions from the local nobility. To consolidate these gains, Ralph ordered the "strengthening" of a "castle in Maelienydd" in 1242, which in his absence was undertaken in the name of his young son Roger Mortimer. This work is identified with the north-eastern castle at Castle Bank; "strengthening" (firmavit) may imply the reconstruction of an existing castle in stone, particularly as the establishment of a castle at Cefnllys is not explicitly recorded. Subsequent primary source references to Cefnllys describe it as the "new castle". Upon Ralph's death in 1246, Cefnllys Castle is listed in a patent roll as passing into the custodianship of the crown until Roger's coming of age.

And after they had come inside by treachery they slew the gate-keepers and seized Hywel ap Meurig, who was constable there, and his wife and his sons and his daughters.

— Brut y Tywysogion

Starting in 1256, a large Welsh uprising led by Llywelyn ap Gruffudd, the new prince of Gwynedd, caused an English military reversal across Wales. By the time a truce was signed in 1260, Cefnllys had become Roger's most advanced outpost following the loss of the neighbouring commote of Gwrtheyrnion and the castle at Builth. In late November 1262, Cefnllys was seized from Roger's constable Hywel ap Meurig by a small band of Welshmen, who entered the castle "by treachery" and took Hywel and his family captive, before sending word to Llywelyn of their success and torching the castle. (Note: Although described in primary sources as a spontaneous local revolt, J. Beverley Smith suggests Llywelyn may have instigated events in order to force a favourable peace treaty upon Henry III, recognising his supremacy within Wales. He would achieve this by striking at Mortimer, who represented the greatest obstacle to his authority in the March.) In response, Roger Mortimer levied an army of Marcher lords and arrived at Cefnllys to start repairs on the walls, but was caught off guard when Llywelyn surrounded him with a larger force. After a three-week siege within the damaged and unprovisioned castle, during which Llywelyn's soldiers sacked Roger's other castles at Bleddfa and Knucklas, Roger was forced to negotiate safe passage. Llywelyn allowed the Marcher force to retreat, a chivalrous gesture probably designed to strengthen his case at future peace negotiations, before destroying the remaining defences and continuing his campaign against England. The impact of Cefnllys' fall is illustrated in a letter written to Henry III by Peter of Aigueblanche, bishop of Hereford, as he fled for Gloucester: "Mortimer's castle of Cefnllys has capitulated: Roger and his retinue have left unharmed. All this has led to rumours of treachery and the whole March is in terror."

The peace signed at the Treaty of Montgomery in September 1267 was a major success for Llywelyn, granting him formal recognition as Prince of Wales. Even though Cefnllys remained outside of his direct control and Roger Mortimer was permitted to rebuild the castle, Roger would provisionally hold the land on Llywelyn's behalf, as long as Llywelyn could demonstrate his right to it. Cefnllys, and the ambiguous clause regarding it, would become an imminent point of contention.

=== Second masonry castle ===
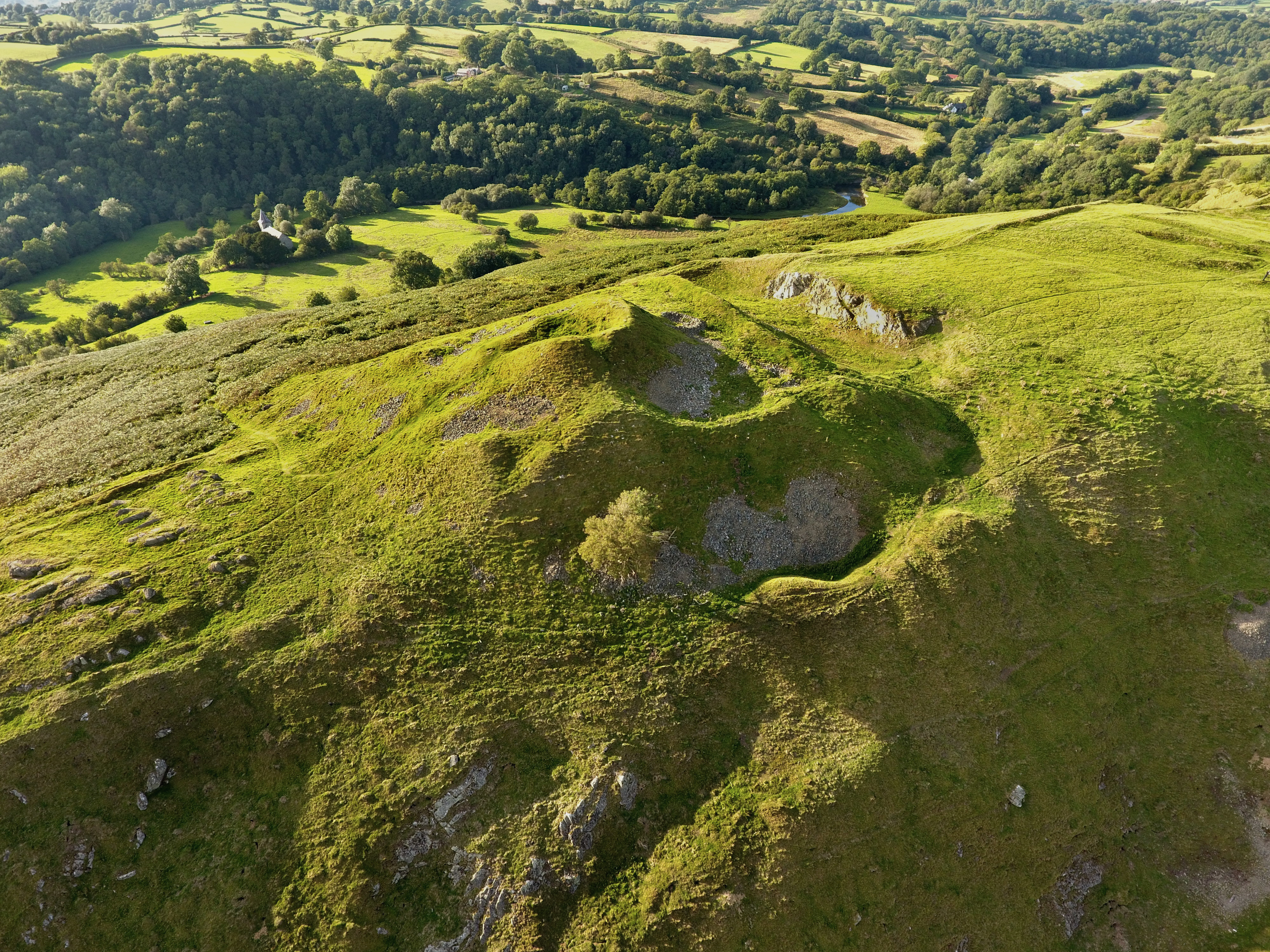
The "wide and deep ditch" separating the southern keep from the ridge concerned Llywelyn.

In the treaty [of Montgomery] it was provided that Roger Mortimer could only repair the castle at Kefen y Llys in Maelienid and that when the said castle was restored, justice should be done to Llywelyn concerning both the castle and the adjacent lands, according to the laws and customs of the Marches. This justice Llywelyn has not been able, so far, to obtain, although the said work has long been repaired. But the said Roger has, against the form of the peace, and to Llywelyn's prejudice, constructed a new work, not merely a fence, as has been suggested to the king, but a wide and deep ditch, and stones and timber have been brought to construct a fortress unless it is prevented by the king or by Llywelyn.

— extract from Llywelyn's 1273/4 letter to Edward I.

Roger Mortimer moved quickly to refortify Castle Bank after the Treaty of Montgomery. The northern castle may have been repaired before the end of 1267, when Llywelyn wrote to Henry III complaining about the status of Cefnllys. Roger then started building a new, stronger castle on the southern side of the ridge, which Llywelyn, who interpreted the treaty as only permitting repairs to the existing castle, viewed as a provocation. Llywelyn sent a letter to Edward I on 22 July 1273 or 1274 protesting Roger's "new work", and requested that Edward prevent construction from continuing, lest he take action himself. The argument over Cefnllys was foremost among a series of territorial disputes between Llywelyn and the Marcher lords, which fed into a deteriorating climate of suspicion and distrust, further increased when Edward accepted defectors from Llywelyn's realm in 1274. The historian Robert Rees Davies wrote that Llywelyn, who also faced intense financial and domestic pressure, came to suspect "an orchestrated attempt to undermine his hard-won gains, especially in the middle March, and to subvert the terms of the Treaty of 1267". These grievances escalated into Llywelyn's refusal to pay homage to Edward I in 1275 and fuelled Edward's determination to pacify the insubordinate prince, culminating in Edward's subjugation of Wales between 1277 and 1283.

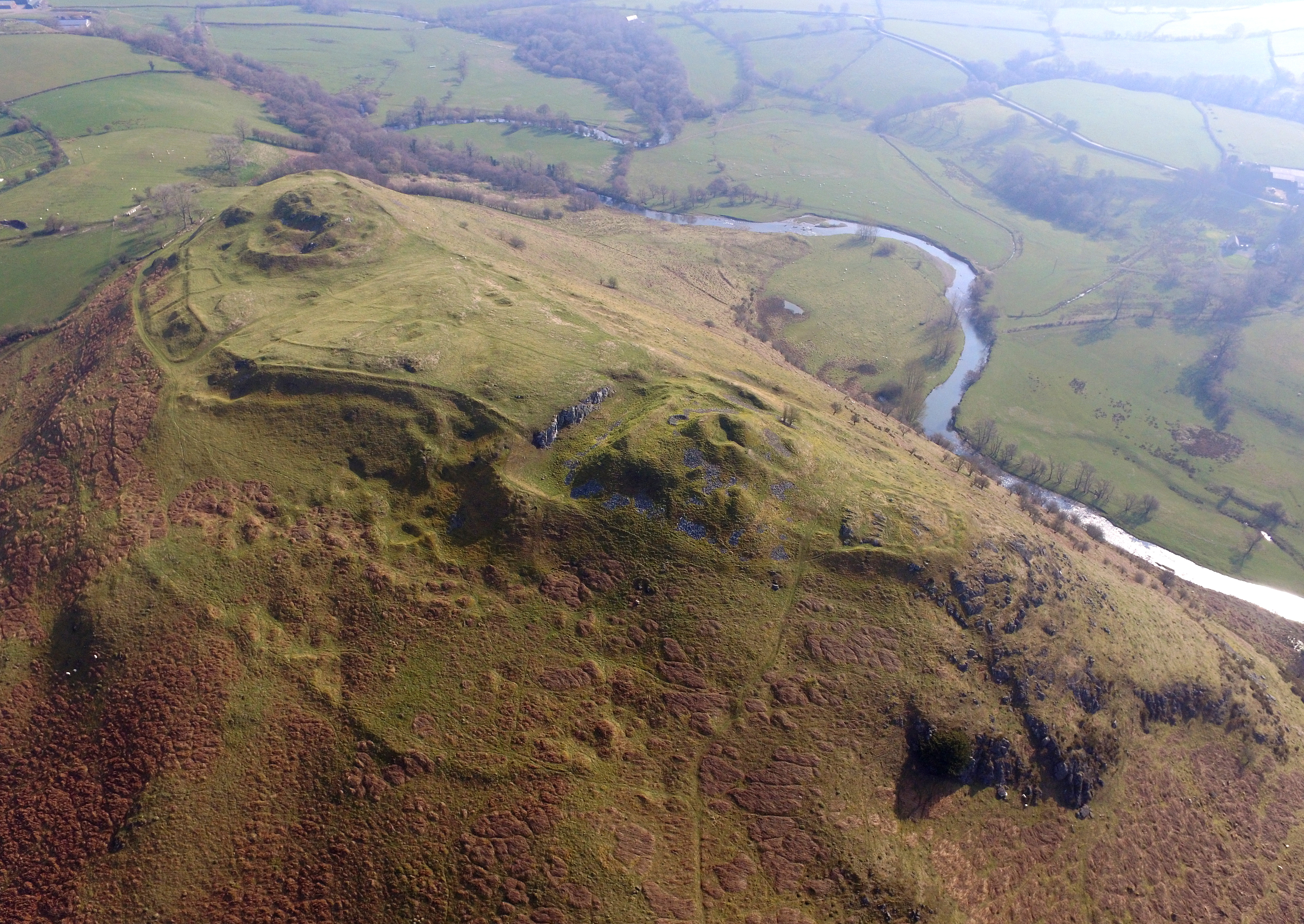
A morning view of Castle Bank, with the earthworks clearly visible

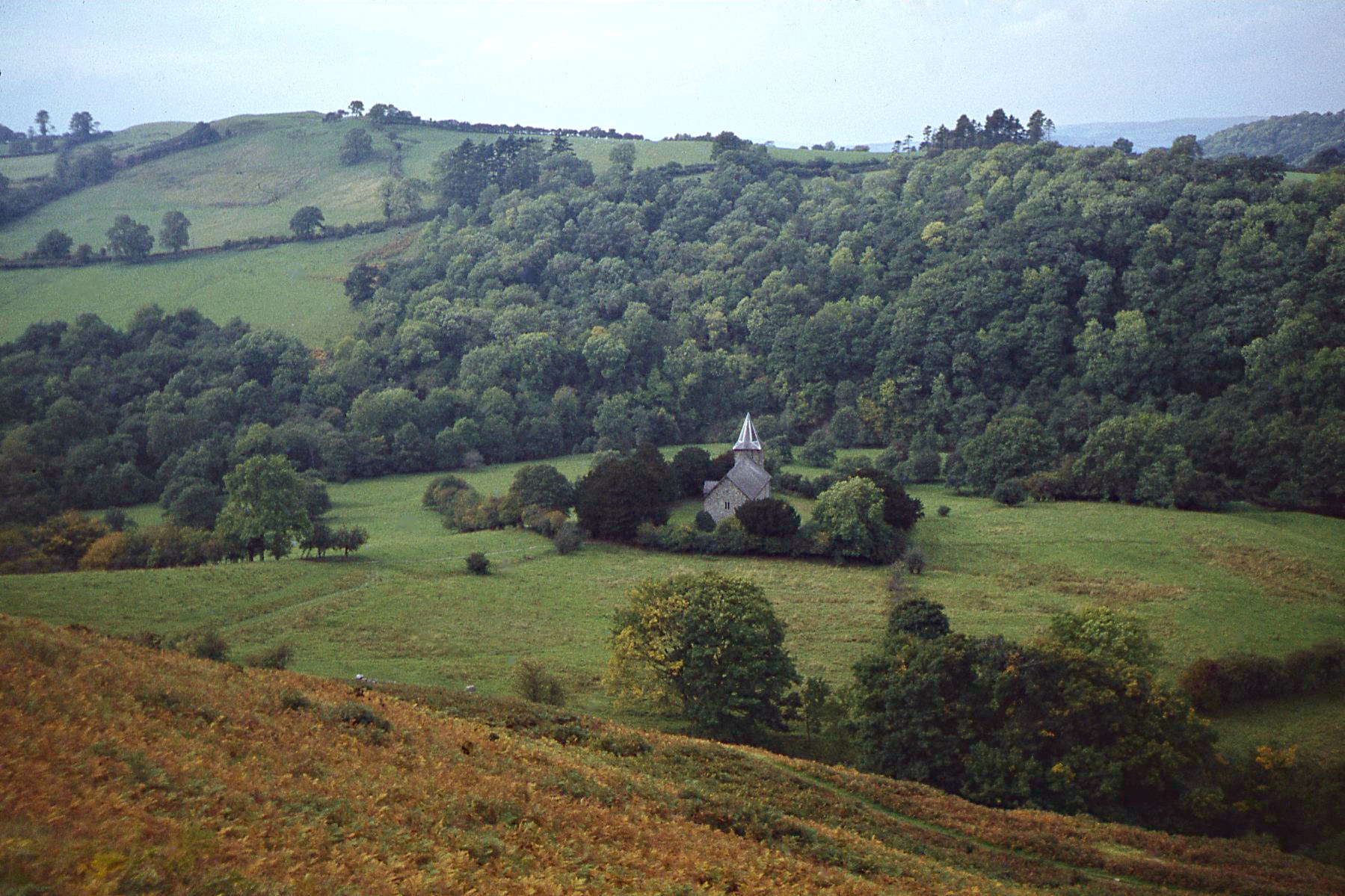
The ring of yew trees around the church hint at a pre-Norman foundation. The surrounding earthworks may be the site of the town.

Cefnllys was not directly attacked in the ensuing conflict but formed part of a chain of garrisoned castles encircling Llywelyn's territories, which contributed to the rebellion's suppression. Roger died in 1282 and his heir, Edmund Mortimer, 2nd Baron Mortimer, paid for a garrison of eight horsemen and 20 footmen throughout the second phase of fighting (1282–3). In October 1294, Cefnllys was listed as one of the castles captured by "Rees ap Morgan" during the revolt of Madog ap Llywelyn, although the archaeologists David Browne & Alastair Pearson have expressed uncertainty over this account. (Note: In the context of the castles listed, Browne & Pearson identify "Rees ap Morgan" with Morgan ap Maredudd, a rebel in Glamorgan, and cast doubt on the accuracy of the record given his geographic distance from Cefnllys. They propose that Madog ap Llywelyn may have taken the castle, while acknowledging the possibility that the castle of "Kenles" described in the primary source could refer to a site other than Cefnllys. Another interpretation is that the capture was led by the regional leader Cynan ap Maredudd.) In 1306, the castle passed into the hands of Roger Mortimer, 1st Earl of March, who led an unsuccessful rebellion against Edward II which resulted in the confiscation of his holdings, including Cefnllys, in 1322. Roger returned from exile in 1326 and successfully overthrew Edward, briefly becoming de facto ruler of England alongside Queen Isabella, until he was executed in 1330 by Edward III. Cefnllys was forfeited by the Mortimers as punishment but returned to the family the following year. Repairs of the castle and its hall were carried out from 1356 to 1357, and at the outbreak of the Welsh uprising led by Owain Glyndŵr in 1400, Cefnllys was in temporary royal custody. Records show that it was defended by a well-provisioned force of 12 spearmen and 30 archers – a detailed register of supplies sent to the castle in 1403 survives. This may have been insufficient, as a 1405 grant to Richard Grey described the lordship as "burned and wasted by the Welsh rebels", though it is unclear whether the castle itself was sacked or if the destruction was limited to its hinterland.

The castle survived into the 15th century in a reparable state, but its upkeep was increasingly neglected as advances in warfare and shifting social patterns undermined its importance. The death of Edmund Mortimer, 5th Earl of March, of plague in 1425 marked the end of the Mortimer male line and the castle was inherited by Edmund's nephew Richard, Duke of York, who paid for repair work and appointed officials from a new class of Welsh office-holders to manage his distant estate. Throughout the Marches, minor Welsh nobles were rising to positions of local power, and they preferred the comfort of oak courts to draughty stone castles: in the view of historian Richard Suggett, change was "expressed architecturally by the decay of the masonry castles ... and by the building of new timber halls at or near the castle sites by the Welshmen of influence within a lordship". The pre-eminent mid-15th century travelling poet Lewys Glyn Cothi composed four poems regarding Cefnllys, including one which describes such a hall on Castle Bank. The poems, which survive in a manuscript from 1468 (although they probably date from 1432 to 1459), praise the Welshman Ieuan ap Phylip, who was constable of Cefnllys Castle and receiver of the lordship of Maelienydd. Ieuan had a two-storey hall built to exhibit his status and entertain guests, and, uniquely, Lewys' poetry records the name of the master carpenter as Rhosier ab Owain. The accession of Richard's son and heir, Edward, to the English throne in 1461 caused Cefnllys to become crown property. It was included in a grant of predominantly ruined castles to Prince Arthur by Henry VII in 1493, and the antiquarian John Leland recorded that the castle was "now downe" in the first half of the 16th century. The castle was described as ruins in a 1687 deed of sale.

Kastell gwyn(n) uwch llynwyn llawn
Kaer wythochr uwch kwrr Ieithawn
Kaer Roec mewn de[u]dec gwregys
Kyfenw y lle yw Kefn Llys
Henw y gaer honno a gaet
Y mrut mawr y Mortmerieit.

Translation:

A white castle above a full moat,
An eight-sided fortress above a loop of the Ieithon,
A Greek fortress with twelve girdles [of defences].
The name of the place is Cefn llys,
The name of that fortress is to be found
In the great Brut [chronicle] of the Mortimers.

— Lewys Glyn Cothi

== Castle town ==
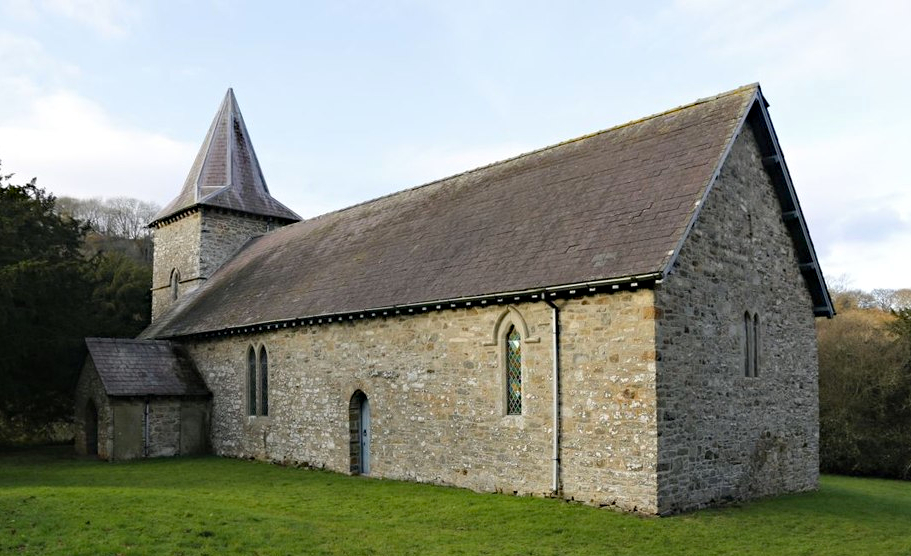
St Michael's Church

The Mortimers encouraged the development of a castle town at Cefnllys in order to consolidate their hold on the surrounding land, as well as the wider cantref. The date of its establishment is unrecorded, (Note: Maurice Beresford claims the town was established concurrently with the first castle in the 1240s, but he supplies no evidence for this. An attempt to replicate the success of royally-sponsored English colonisation at Flint, Aberystwyth and Rhuddlan soon after Edward I's conquest is considered more likely.) and its existence is first documented in 1297 with the granting of a market charter. It was accorded borough status in 1304 when it possessed 25 burgesses, a church and a town mill. Records of pontage indicate the existence of a toll bridge, and a deer park was recorded in 1360. The presence of a manor at Cefnllys was highly unusual given the upland terrain and demonstrates the Mortimers' efforts to establish manorialism in Maelienydd. Their rule was unpopular among the local Welsh, who in 1297 took their complaints to Edward I, compelling Edmund Mortimer to restore the traditional court at nearby Cymaron as an alternative to the manorial court at Cefnllys Castle. The lord's authority remained limited to the district surrounding the castle and only limited tribute, rather than rent, was extracted from the wider Welsh community.

The lack of visible remains has meant the town's location has not been conclusively proven. The population may have been small enough to fit within the enclosure of Castle Bank, and supporters of this interpretation emphasise the settlement's military role as a garrison town. In this view, the stone wall surrounding Castle Bank would have formed part of the town defences. The more frequent explanation is that the settlement was concentrated around St Michael's Church, where there would have been easy access to the mill and a nearby spring. A series of earthworks surrounding the church may represent raised causeways, sunken roads and medieval house platforms, although archaeological finds have been mostly from the Tudor period or later. The church's structure is of 13th century origin, but the date of its founding is unknown and it was heavily restored in 1895.

The town was small, remote and short-lived: growth stalled before 1332 and in 1383 it was recorded as having only 10 residents. Davies comments that its location, accompanying a castle site chosen for defensiveness and ability to radiate strategic power, undermined its economic viability: "the artificiality of [its] commercial setting was too obvious once the military opportunities ... had been removed". The economic weakness of Cefnllys is also emphasised by historians Oliver Creighton and Robert Higham. Major outbreaks of bubonic plague across Britain in 1349, 1361–62 and 1369 contributed to its failure, and the persistent threat of violent conflict within the March expedited its demise. Cefnllys remained a borough after the decline of the medieval settlement, and according to the 1831 census it comprised, besides the church and castle ruins, 16 inhabitants in "three Farm Houses and one small Cottage".

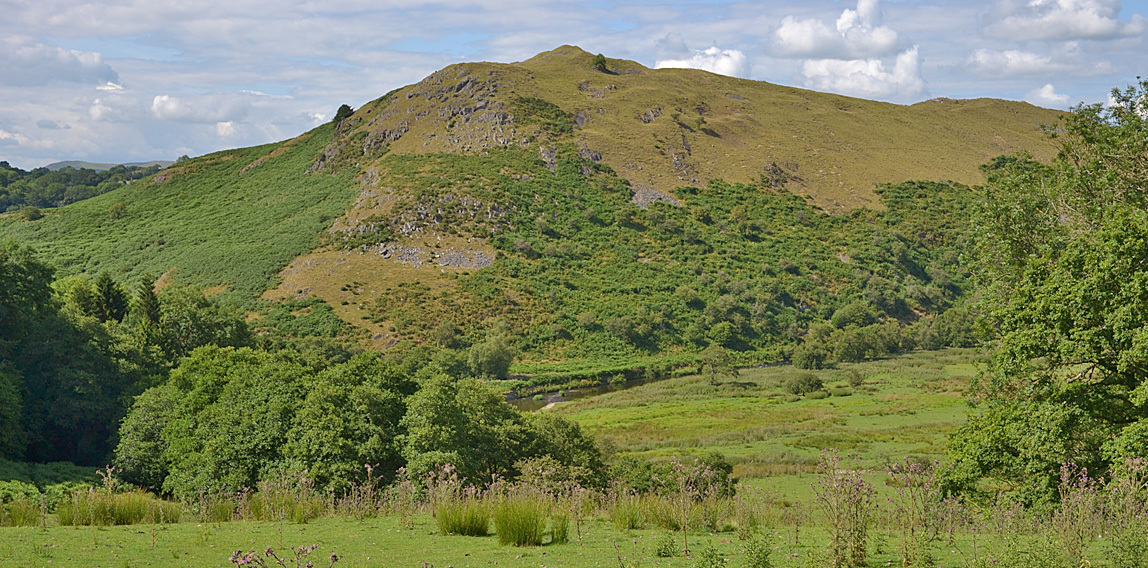
Panorama of Castle Bank from across the River Ithon, looking towards the site of the southern castle

== See also ==
- Cefnllys (medieval town)
- Maelienydd
- Dineithon
