= Baron Mortimer =

Barony in the Peerage of England

Arms of Mortimer of Wigmore, Earls of March: Barry or and azure, on a chief of the first two pallets between two base esquires of the second over all an inescutcheon argent

Several members of the Mortimer family were summoned to Parliament during the reign of Edward I, thereby making them hereditary barons in the Peerage of England. The most important family with this surname were the lords of Wigmore, a marcher lordship on the borders of Herefordshire and Shropshire with Wales, living at Wigmore Castle. The second Baron Mortimer of Wigmore was created Earl of March.

The others probably all belonged to juvenile branches of that family.

- The Mortimers of Chirk had another marcher lordship, which was given to a younger brother of the first Baron Mortimer of Wigmore.
- The Mortimers of Richard's Castle were descended from the Mortimers of Attleborough, who had separated from the Wigmore family long before.
- Simon de Mortimer was summoned to parliament on 26 August 1296, but nothing more is known of that title.

== Feudal lords of Wigmore ==
- Roger de Mortemer had Mortemer Castle in Normandy
- Ralph or Ranulph de Mortimer had Wigmore at the time of Domesday Book, and died in the 12th century.
- Hugh de Mortimer I probably died c.1149 (but the genealogy is not quite certain).
- Roger de Mortimer I, probably son of Hugh I, died 1153
- Hugh de Mortimer II, probably brother of Roger I, died c. 1181.
- Roger Mortimer II, died 1214, son of Hugh II
- Hugh Mortimer III, died 1227, son of Roger II
- Ralph Mortimer II, died 1246, brother of Hugh III
- Roger de Mortimer III, became 1st Baron Mortimer

== Baron Mortimer of Wigmore ==
- Roger Mortimer, 1st Baron Mortimer, of Wigmore (1231–1282)
- Edmund Mortimer, 2nd Baron Mortimer, of Wigmore, (1251–1304)
- Roger Mortimer, 3rd Baron Mortimer (1287–1330), created Earl of March in 1328; attainted 1330.
- Roger Mortimer, 2nd Earl of March (1328–1360) (restored 1348), Son of the 4th Baron Mortimer, Grandson of the 1st earl.
- Edmund Mortimer, 3rd Earl of March (1352–1381), 5th Baron Mortimer
- Roger Mortimer, 4th Earl of March (1374–1398), 6th Baron Mortimer
- Edmund Mortimer, 5th Earl of March (1391–1425), 7th Baron Mortimer
- Richard Plantagenet, 3rd Duke of York (1411–1460), 8th Baron Mortimer
- Edward Plantagenet, 4th Duke of York (1442–1483), 9th Baron Mortimer (became King Edward IV in 1461)

== Baron Mortimer (1296) ==
- Simon de Mortimer, 1st Baron Mortimer (d. a.1296)

== Baron Mortimer of Chirk (1299) ==
On 6 February 1299 Roger de Mortimer was summoned to parliament. After the third baron, nothing further is known of this title.

- Roger de Mortimer, 1st Baron Mortimer of Chirk. He died in captivity in 1326 having had to surrender his lands in 1322.
- Roger de Mortimer, 2nd Baron Mortimer of Chirk died in 1334 without having obtained Chirk.
- John de Mortimer, 3rd Baron Mortimer of Chirk was an infant at his father's death. He failed to recover Chirk from the Earl of Arundel and surrendered his claim in 1359 to the Earl of Arundel, and subsequently lived in obscurity near Rochester in Kent). The Barony is presumably in abeyance among his posterity.

== Baron Mortimer of Richard's Castle (1299) ==
The title Baron Mortimer of Richard's Castle was created once in the Peerage of England. On 6 February 1299 Hugh de Mortimer was summoned to parliament. At his death in 1304 the barony fell into abeyance.

- Hugh de Mortimer, 1st Baron Mortimer of Richard's Castle (d. 1304)

His younger brother was summoned as Baron Zouche in 1323.
