= Maelienydd =

Welsh medieval cantref and lordship

Coordinates: 52.255°N 3.340°W

Location of Maelienydd

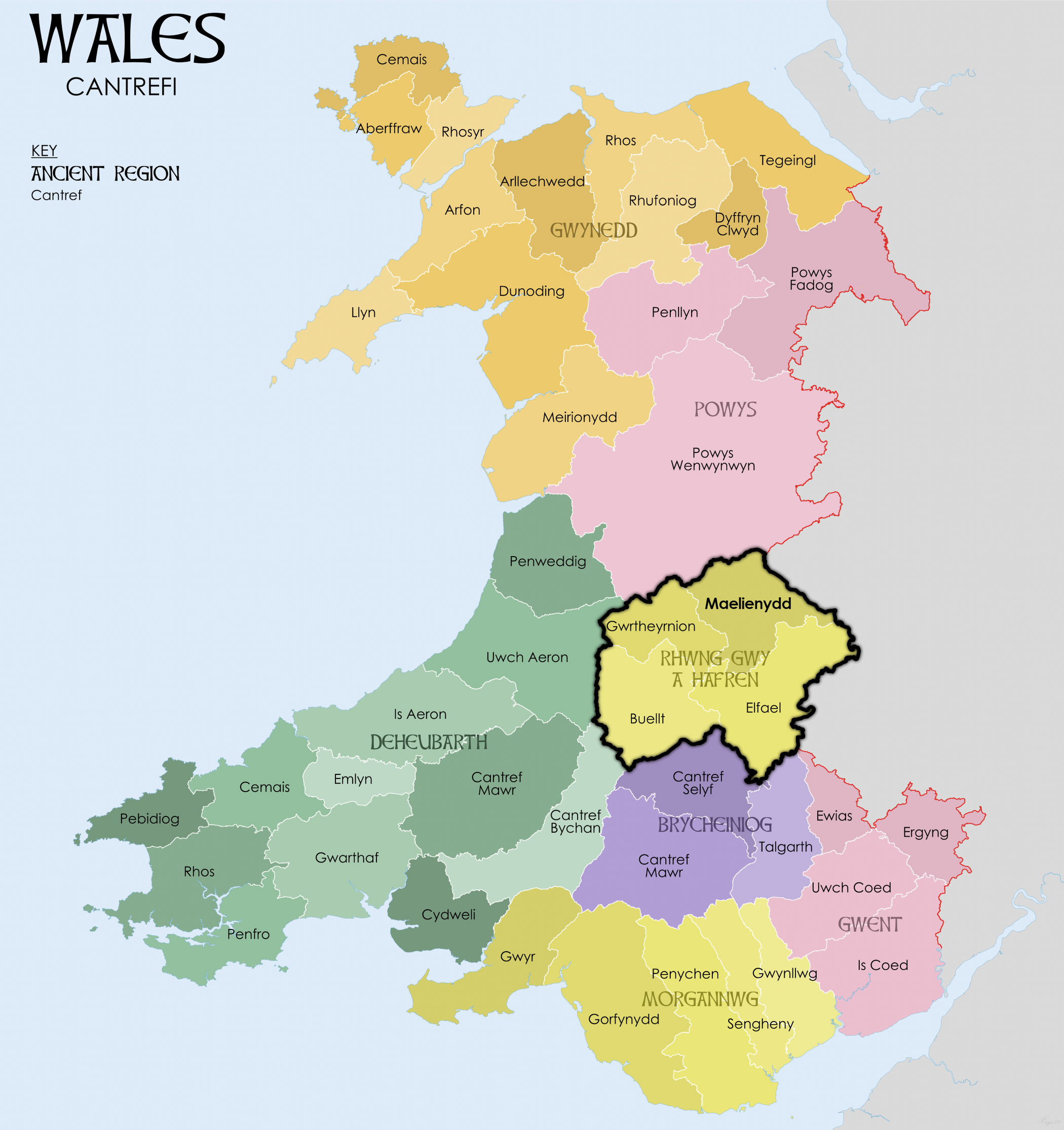
The region of Rhwng Gwy a Hafren within medieval Wales

Maelienydd within Rhwng Gwy a Hafren

Maelienydd, sometimes spelt Maeliennydd, was a cantref and lordship in east central Wales covering the area from the River Teme to Radnor Forest and the area around Llandrindod Wells. The area, which is mainly upland, is now in Powys. During the Middle Ages it was part of the region known as Rhwng Gwy a Hafren (English: Between the Wye and the Severn) and its administrative centre was at Cefnllys Castle.

== History ==
=== Early history ===
According to historic manuscripts, the region between the Wye and the Severn was once regarded as a unit. Manuscripts use various alternative spellings for this, such as Ferlix, Fferllys, Fferleg, and Fferreg; in his Hanes Cymru, the historian John Davies argued, based on these alternatives, that it was probably named Fferyllwg, and that the name may refer to ironworkers (Fferyll in Welsh).

Welsh tradition (as reported for example by the 1844 Topographical Dictionary of Wales), claims that Ferlix was part of the realm of King Caradoc (more usually associated with Gwent), but on his death, the realm was divided between his sons; Cawdraf received Ferlix, while Meurig received the rest of the realm, as Gwent. In any case, manuscripts give Tangwydd ap Tegid, an 8th-century ruler of Ferlix, the following pedigree:

- Cawrdaf ap Caradoc
- Caw ap Cawrdaf
- Gloyw ap Caw
- Hoyw ap Gloyw
- Cynfarch ap Hoyw
- Cyndegg ap Cynfarch
- Teithwalch ap Cyndegg
- Tegid ap Teithwalch
- Tangwydd ap Tegid

Welsh annals claim that during the reign of Tangwydd's father, Tegid, the Mercians seized parts of Ferlix, by constructing Offa's Dyke through it. For unclear reasons, Tangwydd also became ruler of Brycheiniog, which lay adjacent to Ferlix; Elisse ap Rhain, the previous king of Brycheiniog, only had daughters, so it is possible that Tangwydd obtained Brycheiniog by marriage.

Hwgan, Tangwydd's son and successor, attempted to invade Mercia, while King Edward the Elder was distracted by the Viking invasion; Hwgan, however, hadn't reckoned with Edward's sister, Æthelflæd, who lead an army against him. Æthelflæd defeated Hwgan, in battle, then invaded his lands, captured Hwgan's castle (in Brycheiniog). and took his wife prisoner. Hwgan decided to form an alliance with the Vikings, but died soon after, while defending Derby (at the time held by the Vikings) from the Saxons.

=== New dynasties ===
As Hwgan had been an aggressor against the Saxons, his son Dryffin was forced by King Æthelstan to pay tribute, and was deposed from Ferlix. He was replaced by Elystan Glodrydd, Æthelstan's god-son (and namesake), united Ferlix with his existing realm of Buellt; Dryffin and his heirs would now only rule in Brycheiniog. Elystan was succeeded by his son, Cadwgan, who was succeeded by his eldest son, Idnerth; a younger son gave rise to the Cadogan family, who were raised to the nobility many centuries later.

Following the Norman conquest of England in 1066 many Welsh princes, who owed allegiance to the Saxon kings, assisted anti-Norman revolts such as that of Eadric the Wild. Hence, in 1080, when a revolt broke out in Northern England, the Normans pre-emptively occupied Wales to prevent any further Welsh assistance to the Saxons. In turn, this led to a Welsh revolt in 1094, but by the end of the century it was successfully suppressed by a number of Norman magnates; the northern parts of Ferlix were conquered by Ranulph de Mortimer. He founded the castles of Dinieithon (near present Llandrindod Wells) and Cymaron (between Llanbister and Llangunllo).

Ranulph's daughter (Hawise) had married Stephen of Aumale, the cousin of William Rufus, the King. In 1095, Ranulph took part in an unsuccessful conspiracy to replace the king with his son-in-law, and was consequently exiled. Idnerth was able to recover his lands in northern Ferlix; he reached agreement with Philip de Braose, the conqueror of southern Ferlix, to regain most of the remainder, but had to consent to Braose retaining Buellt and the area around New Radnor. Idnerth passed his lands to his son, Madog, but when Madog died, in 1140, Ferlix was divided between Madog's sons.

The exile of Ranulph and his family had continued throughout this time, due to supporting a rival of William's brother (and successor) Henry (namely, Robert Curthose the Duke of Normandy). After Henry's death, in 1135, Ranulph's family supported the successful invasion of England by Stephen of Blois, and were able to return. In 1142, once forces loyal to Empress Matilda (the legitimate heir of King Henry) managed to capture Stephen, and Stephen's partisans began to abandon his cause, Hugh de Mortimer (grandson of Ranulph) invaded northern Ferlix, killing Hywel and Cadwgan, sons of Madog, in the process. In 1144, Hugh repaired Cymaron Castle, and from this base, two years later, he invaded the south of Ferlix, leading to the death of Maredudd, another of Madog's sons.

After 1148, Matilda's son Henry gradually weakened Stephen's position, and eventually was acknowledged his heir; in 1155 Henry became king. During this period, Henry's growing political strength enabled him to force Hugh to surrender his Welsh castles. The two remaining sons of Madog had by now re-divided Ferlix between them; Cadwallon received the northern half, which became Maelienydd, while his brother, Einion Clud, ruled the southern half, which became Elfael.

In 1176 Cadwallon founded Cwmhir Abbey. In 1179, Cadwallon visited King Henry II of England (for reasons which do not survive). Upon his return, on 22 September, he was killed by some retainers of Hugh de Mortimer's son, Roger; the king was outraged, and imprisoned Roger for 3 years.

=== Maelgwn ===
Maelienydd was inherited by Cadwallon's son, Maelgwn ap Cadwallon (not to be confused with Maelgwn ap Cadwallon of Gwynedd, also known as Maelgwn Gwynedd, who lived centuries before), but King Henry seized Cymaron castle, to use the income from its lands to pay back large debts that Cadwallon owed him. When Roger Mortimer was released, he seized much of Maelienydd, including Cymaron, though Maelgwn was able to recover it with the help of Rhys ap Gruffydd, prince of Deheubarth, his cousin's father-in-law; Maelgwn had opted to become a vassal of Rhys, in order to increase his ability to resist Mortimer. One of the main versions of Welsh law, the Cyfnerth Redaction, is thought to originate from Maelienydd during this time.

King Henry was succeeded by Richard the Lionheart, who soon decided to drive forward the Third Crusade. On 5 March 1188, during their tour of Wales, Gerald of Wales visited Ferlix with Baldwin, the Archbishop of Canterbury, seeking soldiers for the Third Crusade; they met Maelgwn at his castle of Crug Eryr (described by Gerald as 'Cruker Castle'), and convinced him to "take the cross" (i.e. join the crusade) like his cousin Einion o'r Porth (ruler of Elfael and son of Einion Clud) had done a few days earlier.

Richard's absence during the crusade allowed Rhys to increase his already great dominance over other Welsh princes, establishing effective hegemony; when Richard returned he was determined to restrain Rhys. Shortly thereafter, the murder of Einion (himself recently returned from Crusade) by Gwalter, his own brother, lead to military intervention by the Sheriff of Hereford (William de Braose); when Rhys opposed this, the king had the excuse he needed to suppress the power of Deheubarth. Local Norman magnates were provided with troops by the king, to invade lands under the sway of Deheubarth; Roger Mortimer was the magnate who attacked Maelienydd, and by 1200 had conquered it. In that year, Roger granted a charter of liberties to Cwmhir Abbey.

Maelgwn and his brother, Hywel, found refuge in Gwynedd. Maelgwn died in exile, two years later.

=== Gwyneddian hegemony ===
In 1210, Hywel, and Maelgwn's eldest son, Madog, came to an accommodation with Roger Mortimer. However, two years later, they murdered William de Mora, so King John had them executed (by hanging) at Bridgnorth. Maelgwn's remaining sons – Cadwallon and Maredudd – inherited the land, and vengefully became vassals of Gwynedd, the dominant state in North Wales, ruled by Llywelyn Fawr. In 1230, Ralph Mortimer, Roger's son and heir, married Llywelyn's daughter. Ten years later, however, following the repudiation of the Treaty of Gwerneigron by Llywelyn's son and successor, Dafydd, Ralph invaded Maelienydd. In 1242, he constructed Cefnllys Castle at the former site of Dineithon.

In 1247, the grievances of Gwynedd were settled by the Treaty of Woodstock. Two years later, Maelgwn's grandsons (Maredudd ap Maelgwn, and Hywel ap Cadwallon, not to be confused with the hanged Hywel), petitioned the king to be restored to part of Maelienydd – Ceri; despite the advice of the king's advisors, who pointed out Maredudd and Hywel's past support for Gwynedd's rebellion, this seems to have been granted.

Nevertheless, a few years later the subsequent Gwyneddian prince, Llywelyn ap Gruffudd (grandson of Llywelyn Fawr), became aggrieved by Henry III's suggestion of adjusting the Treaty of Woodstock to provide for Llywelyn's younger brother, who had now reached adulthood. Llywelyn attacked the Perfeddwlad, which was held by Henry's son, Edward. Henry's problems with his barons (eventually leading to the Second Barons' War) prevented him from fully resisting Llywelyn's campaign, so Llywelyn took advantage by expanding Gwynedd's power even further. In 1262 Maelienydd fell to Llywelyn.

In 1275, Llywelyn ap Gruffudd married Eleanor de Montfort, the daughter of Henry's greatest enemy. Aggrieved by this, Edward, the new king, declared Llywelyn a rebel, and in 1277 attacked Gwynedd with an enormous army. Llywelyn was forced to agree, by the Treaty of Aberconwy, to limit his authority to Gwynedd alone. Maelienydd was given to Llywelyn Fawr's other grandson, Roger Mortimer, the son of Ralph; this hence became a Marcher Lordship, outside of either English or Welsh law; Maredudd's son, Madog, however, was confirmed in possession of Ceri, which was detached from Maelienydd as a distinct Marcher Lordship. Madog's son married Einion o r Porth's granddaughter.

In 1282, Llywelyn ap Gruffudd again attacked Edward's lands, and was subsequently killed in Buellt, while attacking the local castle; his headless body was buried in Cwmhir Abbey. As the forces of Ceri had sided with Llywelyn, Ceri was declared forfeit, and handed to Roger. Strictly speaking, however, Ceri was not the last part of Ferlix to be dominated by the family of Elystan Glodrydd. In the 15th century, the descendant and heir of Roger Mortimer, Richard Plantagenet, appointed Ieuan ap Philip as castellan of Cefnllys; Ieuan was a scion of the Cadogan family, and thus a direct male descendant of Elystan Glodrydd, by a cadet branch

=== Fate ===
In 1277, Elfael had been acquired by the Tosny family, apart from the area around Radnor, which had been given to Roger Mortimer (in right of his wife, Maud de Braose, heir of Philip de Braose). By the 15th century, the Tosny lordship had been inherited by Margaret Beauchamp of Bletso, whose grandson, Henry, married Richard Plantagenet's granddaughter, and heir, Elizabeth of York. Ferlix was therefore re-united when Maelienydd, Radnor, and the rest of Elfael, was inherited by Henry and Elizabeth's son, King Henry VIII. Following Henry VIII's Laws in Wales Acts, Ferlix became the main part of Radnorshire. The name survives for the general area.

== Subdivisions ==
Maelienydd was subdivided into four commotes:

- Dinieithon
- Ceri
- Rhiwallt
- Buddugre
