= Treaty of Montgomery =

1267 treaty between the kingdoms of England and Wales

- The first page of a contemporary enrolment of the terms of the treaty, agreed on 25 September 1267
- Drafted: 25 September 1267
- Signed: 29 September 1267
- Location: Rhyd Chwima, Montgomery, Welsh Marches
- Effective: 29 September 1267; 759 years ago
- Condition: Ratified by both Llywelyn ap Gruffudd and Henry III of England
- Signatories: Henry III of England; Prince Edward; Ottobuono de' Fieschi; Llywelyn ap Gruffudd; Goronwy ab Ednyfed Fychan; Tudur ab Ednyfed Fychan; Dafydd ab Einion Fychan; Einion ap Caradog; Hywel ap Madog
- Parties: England; Gwynedd
- Depositary: The National Archives (United Kingdom)
- Language: Latin

The Treaty of Montgomery was an Anglo-Welsh treaty signed on 29 September 1267 in Montgomeryshire by which Llywelyn ap Gruffudd was acknowledged as Prince of Wales by King Henry III of England (r. 1216–1272). It was the only time an English ruler recognised the right of a ruler of Gwynedd over Wales. Llywelyn's grandfather Llywelyn the Great had previously laid claim to be the effective prince of Wales by using the title "Prince of Aberffraw, Lord of Snowdon" in the 1230s, after subduing all the other Welsh dynasties. Likewise Llywelyn's uncle, Dafydd ap Llywelyn, claimed the title of Prince of Wales during his reign from 1240 to 1246. However, Llywelyn's supremacy in the late 1260s forced recognition of his authority in Wales by an English Crown weakened by internal division.

== Conditions of the treaty ==
Wales after the Treaty of Montgomery of 1267: Gwynedd, Llywelyn ap Gruffudd's principality Territories conquered by Llywelyn ap Gruffudd Territories of Llywelyn's vassals Lordships of the Marcher barons Lordships of the King of England Kingdom of England

Many of the conditions of the treaty had been anticipated by the Treaty of Pipton (1265) between Llywelyn and Simon de Montfort. The 1267 treaty ceded Builth to Llywelyn, along with Brecon and Gwerthrynion in mid-Wales as well as the four cantrefs in Perfeddwlad. The disputed castle of Cefnllys, which Llywelyn had taken from Roger Mortimer in 1262, was restored to Roger with the condition that the land would be tentatively held from Llywelyn, provided Llywelyn could affirm his right to it. Llywelyn was also granted Whittington Castle in modern-day Shropshire, previously held by his grandfather in the 1220s, and received an assurance that no castle would be built at Hawarden for thirty years by Robert of Moltant, thus helping to secure the north-eastern border of Wales. The treaty also allowed for the reinstatement of Llywelyn's brother, Dafydd ap Gruffudd, into Welsh society after his defection to England in the early 1260s. But most importantly, the biggest concession for the English was it acknowledging Llywelyn's right to bear the title of Prince of Wales which gave him overlordship of all other welsh lords and chieftains except Maredudd ap Rhys whose devotion to the English was rewarded by permission to remain a direct vassal of the king.

The key text would be seen later by the Lord Edward as

"XIII. For the principality, lands, homages and grants the prince and his successors will be bound to give fealty, homage and service to the king and his heirs, which he or his predecessors have been accustomed and obliged to give the kings of England."

== Implications ==
Though the treaty required Llywelyn to do homage to the king of England for the land, it was in effect an acknowledgement of the power and authority of the prince. However, after the succession of Edward I as king of England in 1272, relations between England and Wales deteriorated, and Edward declared war on Llywelyn in 1276; the Treaty of Aberconwy of 1277 superseded the stipulations laid down at Montgomery and severely curbed Llywelyn's power. In December 1282, fifteen years after the original treaty, the army of Montgomery marched to Builth Wells from Montgomery Castle, to surprise and kill Llywelyn. After 1295 and the final Welsh War of the thirteenth century, the castle became more of a military backwater and prison than a front line fortress.

== See also ==
- History of Wales
- List of treaties
