= Battle of Llandeilo Fawr =

1282 battle between English and Welsh forces

Coordinates: 51.884°N 3.996°W

Date	17 June 1282
Location	Llandeilo Fawr
Result	Welsh victory

Belligerents
English	South Welsh

Commanders and leaders
Gilbert de Clare	

Strength
Around 1,600 infantry 100 cavalry	Unknown

Casualties and losses
Heavy casualties: Almost complete destruction of the army	Unknown

The Battle of Llandeilo Fawr took place during the conquest of Wales by Edward I, at Llandeilo between an English army led by Gilbert de Clare, 6th Earl of Hertford, and a South Welsh army led by Rhys ap Maredudd.

== Background ==
During the Conquest of Wales in 1282, Edward I had a plan to move his armies into Wales on three fronts in order to surround the armies of Llywelyn ap Gruffudd and destroy them. Edward sent Gilbert de Clare and his army to subdue and hold down the southern areas of Wales while other armies would invade elsewhere.

Llandeilo Fawr, located near the River Towy, was a vital strategic point. Controlling the area meant access to important trade routes and a stronghold in the heart of Deheubarth, where Rhys ap Maredudd was a member of the royal family.

== Battle ==
Gilbert de Clare with an army of around 1600 infantry and 100 cavalrymen had captured Carreg Cennen Castle from the Welsh. Following their victory, the men sacked the castle, and on the 17th of June they headed back to the nearby English settlement, Dinefwr Castle, to stash the spoils. However, along the way Clare and his men were ambushed by Welsh troops and much of the army was destroyed. This battle showcases the definitive use of guerilla warfare by the Welsh armies during the war for Welsh independence.

== Aftermath ==
The battle is considered to be a great victory for the Welsh, despite the English technically winning the battle. English expansion into South Wales was halted for a few weeks and Edward's plans of an attack on multiple fronts were somewhat spoiled. Among the dead was the son of William de Valence, 1st Earl of Pembroke. Following the defeat, Edward relieved Clare of his command and replaced him with Valence, who was now determined, following the death of his son.
