= Ralph de Mortimer =

Member of the Mortimer family and castle builder

- Born: Before 1198
- Died: 6 August 1246
- Noble family: Mortimer
- Spouse: Gwladus Ddu (m. 1230)
- Issue: 4, including Roger
- Father: Roger de Mortimer
- Mother: Isabel de Ferriers

Ranulph or Ralph de Mortimer (before 1198 to 6 August 1246) was the second son of Roger de Mortimer and Isabel de Ferrers of Wigmore Castle in Herefordshire. He succeeded his elder brother before 23 November 1227 and built Cefnllys and Knucklas castles in 1240.

== Marriage and issue ==
Arms of Mortimer: Barry or and azure, on a chief of the first two pallets between two base esquires of the second over all an inescutcheon argent

In 1230, Ralph married Princess Gwladus, daughter of Llywelyn ab Iorwerth and Joan, Lady of Wales (the only acknowledged, illegitimate daughter of John, King of England). They had the following children:

- Roger Mortimer, 1st Baron Mortimer, in 1247, married Maud de Braose, by whom he had seven children
- Hugh de Mortimer (d. 1273–4), lord of Chelmarsh
- Peter or John Mortimer, a Franciscan friar in Shrewsbury
- Joan Mortimer, who married Piers Corbet, Lord of Caus, Shropshire (d. 1300) around 1253, by whom she had 2 sons, Thomas and Peter Corbet, 2nd Baron Corbet.
