= Welsh heraldry =

Heraldry in Wales has a tradition distinct from that of English and Scottish heraldry. There is evidence that heraldry was already being used in Wales by the middle of the thirteenth century; for instance, in Gwynedd, two sons of Llywelyn the Great are recorded as having borne coats of arms in this period. Following the integration of Wales into England in the fourteenth and fifteenth centuries, the Welsh heraldic tradition became merged into that of England.

== Welsh kingdoms ==
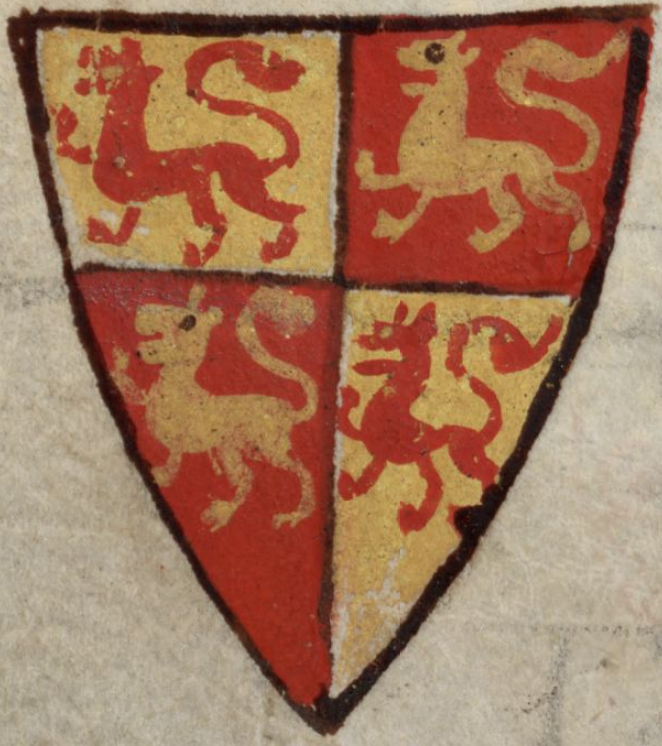
The coat of arms of Llywelyn ap Gruffudd, the last Welsh Prince of Wales, depicted in the Chronica Majora.

Before the conquest of Gwynedd by Edward I, Wales was ruled by a number of Kings and Princes whose dominions shifted and sometimes merged following the vagaries of war, marriage and inheritance. All these Kings and Princes were ascribed personal coats of arms, often retrospectively if they lived before the dawn of heraldry, and these were borne by their descendants in Wales. The two principal Welsh kingdoms were those of Gwynedd, in the north, and Deheubarth in the south. Of these, the most successful, and the last, finally, to fall, was that of Gwynedd, and the arms now borne by the Princes of Wales as an escutcheon are the historic arms of the dynasty of Gwynedd as borne by the last native Princes of Wales, including Llywelyn the Great and Llywelyn ap Gruffudd.

The arms associated with former Kingdom of Powys are a red lion rampant on a gold field. They were used by the House of Mathrafal when Powys was an independent kingdom and later by the Earls of Powis (de la Pole and de Cherleton families) up until the late Middle Ages and can now be found on various civic coats of arms.

The arms associated with the principal dynasty of south Wales (Deheubarth) are, on the other hand, a gold lion rampant on a red field within an indented (sometimes engrailed) gold border. Although never included in the English Royal Arms, they continue to be borne by families descended from the dynasty of Deheubarth: most notably by the Talbot family (Earl of Shrewsbury, etc.) which married an heiress of the dynasty in the 14th century.

Arms/Standard	Kingdom/ Principality	Details
	Kingdom of Gwynedd	Contemporary coat of arms of Llywelyn ap Gruffydd, Prince of Gwynedd. Used by the Princes of Wales since 1911, and by the Caernarvonshire County Council until 1974. Quarterly Or and Gules, four lions passant guardant counter charged, armed and langued Azur.
	Kingdom of Powys & later the Kingdom of Powys Wenwynwyn	Traditional coat of arms of Prince Gwenwynwyn of Powys. Or, a lion Gules armed and langed Azure.
	Kingdom of Powys Fadog	Traditional arms of Madog ap Gruffydd Maelor of Powys Fadog. Argent, a lion Sable armed and langed Gules.
	Kingdom of Deheubarth	Traditional arms of King Rhys ap Tewdwr Mawr of Deheubarth and later used by the Talbot dynasty. Gules a Lion rampant Or, a border engrailed of the last.
	Kingdom of Morgannwg	Attributed arms of King Iestyn ap Gwrgant of Morgannwg. Gules, three Chevronels Argent.
	Kingdom of Ceredigion	Attributed arms of the mythical King Gwaethfoed Fawr, Prince of Cantref Gwaelod, later used by the family of Pryse of Gogerddan, Ceredigion, and the Cardiganshire County Council. Sable, Lion rampant regardant Or.
	Kingdom of Dyfed	Attributed arms of the historically-dubious Prince Gwynfardd of Nanhyfer, Dyfed, a claimed ancestor of several aristocratic families in the area. Later used on the arms of the Dyfed County Council. Azures, Lion rampant between four Roses Or.
	Kingdom of Gwent	Attributed arms of the Kingdom of Gwent, which merged with its neighbour Glywysing to form the Kingdom of Morgannwg. Later used by the Monmouthshire County Council. Per pale Azure and Sable three Fleurs-de-Lis Or.
	Rhwng Gwy a Hafren	Attributed arms of Elystan Glodrydd, the reported ancestor of many families in the district of Rhwng Gwy a Hafren ("between the Wye and the Severn"), and founder of one of the "Five Royal Tribes of Wales". Later used by the Radnorshire County Council. Gules, a Lion rampant reguardant Or.

== Glyndŵr Rebellion ==
Arms/Standard	Kingdom/ Principality	Details
	Principality of Wales	The red lions on a gold banner was first used in Wales by Owain Lawgoch the pretender Prince of Wales in France during the 14th century, and also by Owain Glyndŵr, the de facto Prince of Wales in the 15th century.
	Principality of Wales	Gold dragon of Wales flag raised by Glyndwr during the Welsh War of Independence in the early 15th century.

== Other Welsh heraldry ==
Arms/Standard	User	Details
	Cadwgan ap Bleddyn, Mathrafal Prince of Powys.	Attributed arms of Prince Cadwgan, later used by the Lords of Nannau as the family memorial.
	Nefydd Hardd of Nant Conwy	Attributed arms of Nefydd Hardd, Lord of Nant Conwy and one of the fifteen "founders of the noble tribes of Gwynedd". Seen in the coat of arms of the Aberconwy County Council.
	Marchudd ap Cynan of Rhos and Abergele	Attributed arms of Marchudd ap Cynan, Lord of Rhos and Abergele and one of the fifteen "founders of the noble tribes of Gwynedd". Seen in the coat of arms of the Aberconwy County Council, and the Colwyn County Council.
	Dafydd III, Prince of Wales of the House of Aberffraw.	Attributed arms of Dafydd ap Gruffudd, Prince of Wales of the House of Aberffraw, Kingdom of Gwynedd.
	Owain ap Gruffydd, King of Gwynedd and Prince of Wales	Attributed arms of King Owain ap Gruffydd of Gwynedd, later titled as the first Prince of Wales. Seen in the coat of arms of the Caernarvonshire County Council.
	Dewi Sant, the patron saint of Wales	Attributed arms of Dewi Sant. Seen in the coat of arms of the Ceredigion County Council.
	Llywarch ap Bran, Lord of Menai.	Attributed arms of Llywarch ap Bran, Lord of Menai and one of the founders of the Fifteen Tribes of Wales.
	Edwin, Lord of Tegeingl	Attributed arms of Edwin, Lord of Tegeingl and one of the fifteen "founders of the noble tribes of Gwynedd". Seen in the coat of arms of the Flintshire County Council and Clwyd County Council
	Hwfa ap Cynddelw of Anglesey	Attributed arms of Hwfa ap Cynddelw, Lord of Anglesey and one of the fifteen "founders of the noble tribes of Gwynedd". Seen in the coat of arms of the Isle of Anglesey County Council, and Gwynedd County Council
	Urien Rheged	Attributed arms of King Urien of Rheged, a Brythonic kingdom in what is now Cumbria, England. Seen in the coat of arms of the Lliw Valley County Council
	Cadwgan ap Elystan Glodrydd	Attributed arms of Cadwgan, son of Elystan Glodrydd of Rhwng Gwy a Hafren. Seen in the coat of arms of the Radnorshire County Council.

== Use ==
The arms of Hughes of Gwerclas, showing many important arms

Arms of houses and of influential people are often combined, as shown in this example of the quartered arms of Hughes of Gwerclas, which gives a broad overview of Welsh heraldry. The arms are quarterly of four:

- 1st grand quarter, quarterly of four:
  - 1: Kingdom of Powys Fadog;
  - 2: Cilin ap y Blaidd Rhudd (Lord of Gest);
  - 3: Elystan Glodrydd;
  - 4: Tudor Trevor, Lord of Herford;
- 2nd grand quarter, quarterly of four:
  - 1: Kingdom of Powys;
  - 2: Cadwgan ap Elystan Glodrydd;
  - 3: Kingdom of Powys Fadog;
  - 4: Howel ap Meurig (Lord of Nannau); from Prince Cadwgan ap Bleddyn
- 3rd grand quarter, quarterly of four:
  - 1: Roger of Bryntangor; from the House of Fitzgerald of Corsygedol
  - 2: Tudor ap Griffith Vychan (Lord of Gwyddelwern);
  - 3: Kingdom of Gwynedd;
  - 4: Owain I ap Gruffydd;
- 4th grand quarter, quarterly of four:
  - 1: Kingdom of Deheubarth (later borne by the Talbot family, Earl of Shrewsbury);
  - 2: Philip ap Ivor (Lord of Iscoed); from Prince Owain Gwynedd
  - 3: Gruffydd ap Cynan;
  - 4: Edwin of Tegeingl;

Key features shown are the predominance of the Welsh dragon, the use of colour differences to distinguish branches of a family, and the use of crests. The arms here show an allegiance to both people and to Kingdoms within Wales.

== Royal Badge of Wales ==
The Royal Badge of Wales, adopted in 2008

A new Royal Badge of Wales was approved in May 2008. It is based on the arms borne by Llywelyn the Great, the famous thirteenth century Welsh prince (blazoned quarterly Or and gules, four lions countercharged langued and armed azure), with the addition of the imperial crown atop a continuous scroll which, together with a wreath consisting of the plant emblems of the four countries of the United Kingdom, surrounds the shield. The motto which appears on the scroll, PLEIDIOL WYF I'M GWLAD (I am true to my country), is taken from the National Anthem of Wales and is also found on Welsh design £1 coins. The badge appears on the cover of Acts passed by Senedd Cymru (Welsh Parliament).

The current badge follows in a long line of heraldic devices representing Wales. Its predecessors have all been variations on either the Red Dragon, an ancient emblem revived by Henry VII, or the arms of Llywelyn.

== See also ==
- Armorial of local councils in Wales
- Armorial of schools in the United Kingdom
- Coat of arms of the Prince of Wales
- List of rulers of Wales
- National symbols of Wales
- Welsh Seal
