= Gwrtheyrnion =

Welsh medieval commote

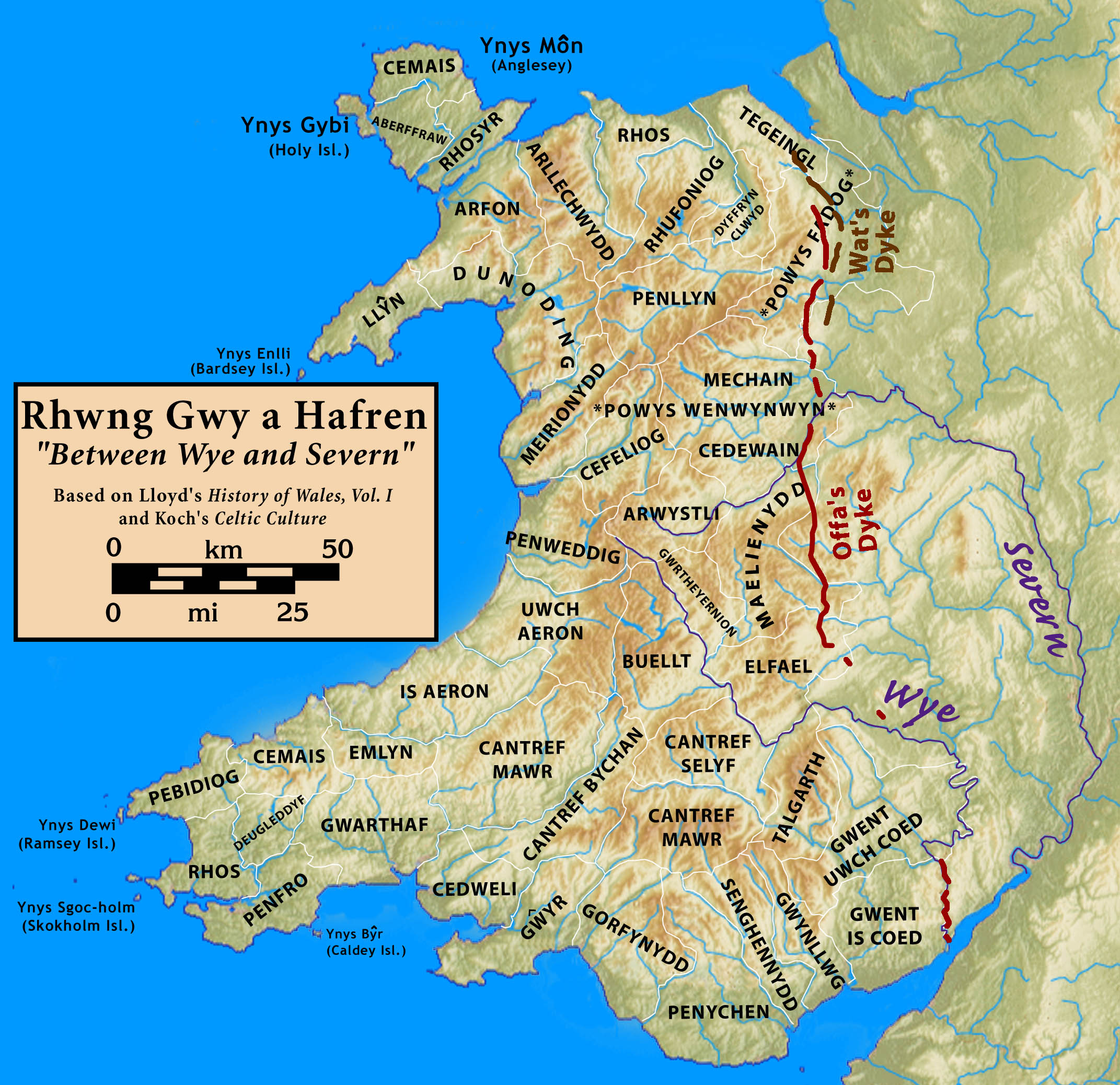
Map of the lands west of Offa's Dyke; Gwrtheyrnion can be seen in the centre

Gwrtheyrnion or Gwerthrynion was a commote in medieval Wales, located in Mid Wales on the north side of the River Wye; its historical centre was Rhayader. It is said to have taken its name from the legendary king Vortigern (Welsh: Gwrtheyrn). For most of the medieval era, it was associated with the cantref of Buellt and then Elfael, small regional kingdoms whose rulers operated independently of other powers. In the Norman era, like the rest of the region between Wye and Severn it came to be dominated by Marcher Lordships.

== Name and boundaries ==
According to the 9th-century Historia Brittonum, Gwrtheyrnion, here Latinised Guorthegirnaim, was named after Vortigern (Welsh: Gwrtheyrn), a legendary 5th-century King of Britain. John Edward Lloyd considers this derivation accurate. Generally, its boundaries were the cantrefi of Arwystli to the north, Maelienydd (in its restricted sense) to the east, Elfael to the southeast, and Buellt to the southwest. It also controlled the commote of Deuddwr (i.e. Cwmwd Deuddwr, also known as Elenydd) on the west of the Wye; together they formed a cantref.

== History ==
=== Early years ===
Territories in and adjacent to the region between Wye and Severn

The Historia Brittonum provides the earliest mention of Gwrtheyrnion. According to the text, Vortigern fled to Gwrtheyrnion after Saint Germanus of Auxerre had castigated him for his various sins. He eventually died, and his son Pascent received Gwrtheyrnion and Buellt from Ambrosius Aurelianus.

One of the text's copyists, from whose copy most other surviving manuscripts are derived, took particular interest in this combined kingdom, tracing its medieval rulers back to Vortigern through Pascent. The dynasty, so these manuscripts report, ended in a certain Ffernfael ap Tewdwr, who is also known from the genealogies from Jesus College MS 20. These Jesus College genealogies indicate that Ffernfael's cousin Brawstudd married Arthfael Hen ap Rhys, the ruler of Morgannwg, implying a floruit for Ffernfael around the early 9th century.

Following Ffernfael's death, Buellt (and hence Gwrtheyrnion) came into the possession of neighbouring Arwystli, for unclear reasons, after having temporarily been in the possession of Seisyllwg, for an unclear amount of time. At around this time, Arwystli's ruler was Iorwerth Hirflawdd; when Iorworth's son Idnerth died, his realm was re-divided, with Buellt (including Gwrtheyrnion) going to Cadwr Gwenwyn (the rest of the realm - Arwystli - went to a different son).

Cadwr's grandson, and heir, married a granddaughter of Merfyn ap Rhodri, the king of Powys (this did not mean that Powys gained any authority over Buellt/Gwrtheyrnion); their grandson, and heir, was Elystan Glodrydd. Elystan Glodrydd conquered the adjacent land between the Wye and Severn - Ferlix (known also by various other spellings, such as Fferllys, Fferleg, and Fferregs) and incorporated it into his own realm. Elystan was succeeded by his son, Cadwgan, who was succeeded by his eldest son, Idnerth; a younger son gave rise to the Cadogan family, who were raised to the nobility many centuries later.

=== Normans ===
Due to their allegiances to the Saxon Kings (Elystan had been the god-son, and namesake, of King Athelstan), once the Normans invaded England, many Welsh princes had assisted anti-Norman revolts like that of Eadric the Wild. Hence, in 1080, when a revolt broke out in Northern England, the Normans pre-emptively occupied Wales, to prevent any further Welsh assistance to the Saxons. In turn, this led to a Welsh revolt in 1094, but by the end of the century it was successfully suppressed by a number of Norman magnates. The southern parts of Ferlix were conquered by Philip de Braose.

Eventually, like other Welsh princes, Idnerth came to a personal agreement with the local Norman magnate; Idnerth was restored to Gwrtheyrnion, and most of Ferlix, but Braose kept the rest of Buellt for himself. Following Idnerth's death, and that of his son, Madog, the retained parts of Ferlix were divided between Madog's sons: Cadwallon received most of the northern half, which became Maelienydd, while the remainder - Elfael - went to his brother, Einion Clud. Einion Clud was succeeded by his son, Einion o'r Porth.

Einion o'r Porth married Susanna, a daughter of Rhys ap Gruffydd, the ruling prince of Deheubarth. The only named ruler of Gwrtheyrnion in historic manuscripts (other than the legendary Pascent) is an Einion ap Rhys who visited the king in 1175, and was Rhys ap Gruffydd's son-in-law; unless this Einion ap Rhys is really a bodged reference to Einion o'r' Porth, then he, his father, and the consequently distinct line of rulers in Gwrtheyrnion, are otherwise entirely unknown. In 1177, Rhayader Castle was built in Gwrtheyrnion by Rhys ap Gruffydd.

Einion was murdered by his own brother, Gwalter. Einion's other brother, Iorwerth Clud, was able to depose Gwalter with the aid of Reginald de Braose (who had, by now, inherited Buellt), in alliance with Llywelyn Fawr (the most powerful Welsh prince). Unfortunately, Llywelyn's son (and successor), Dafydd, chose to repudiate the Treaty of Gwerneigron, which lead to Ralph Tosny seizing Elfael, although Tosny was later expelled from Elfael by Dafydd's nephew, Llywelyn ap Gruffudd. King Henry acknowledged Llywelyn ap Gruffudd's victory, by the Treaty of Montgomery.

However, when Llywelyn ap Gruffudd married Eleanor de Montfort (the daughter of Henry's greatest enemy), Henry's son, Edward I (now King), declared Llywelyn a rebel, and attacked his lands. In 1277 Llywelyn was forced to agree the Treaty of Aberconwy, which made Llywelyn a vassal of Edward, and limited his authority to Gwynedd alone; Elfael was given to Ralph Tosny's grandson.

=== Later history ===
In the 15th century, the Tosny lands were inherited by Margaret Beauchamp of Bletso, and hence by her great-grandson, King Henry VIII. Following the latter's Laws in Wales Acts, Gwrtheyrnion and the rest of Ferlix became Radnorshire. In 1996, Radnorshire and the adjacent counties on either side - Montgomeryshire and Brecknockshire - became the main constituents of the modern county of Powys.
