= Rhayader Castle =

Ruined castle in Powys, Wales

- Rhayader, Powys, Wales
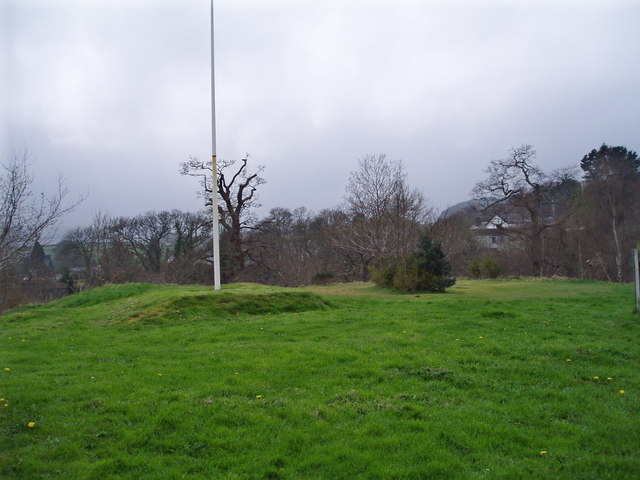

Site information
- Type: Motte-and-bailey castle
- Condition: Demolished

Location
- Shown within Wales
- Coordinates: 52.30049°N 3.51488°W

Scheduled monument
- Reference no.: RD132

Rhayader Castle is the remains of a motte-and-bailey castle in the town of Rhayader, Powys, Wales. The available documentary sources are not clear enough to distinguish between this site and the castle mound across the river and one or the other was probably built by Rhys ap Gruffydd, Prince of Deheubarth, in 1177. At that time the river formed the border between Gwrtheyrnion and the independent state of Buellt; the town of Rhayader is on the Gwrtheyrnion side of the river.

Rhys had recently conquered Buellt, hitherto ruled by William de Braose, as vengeance for the latter's notorious treatment of Welsh princes at Abergavenny Castle. The exact status of Gwrtheyrnion is unclear, its only recorded ruler having been an unidentified Einion ap Rhys, whose is described as Rhys ap Gruffydd's son-in-law; Rhys did have a son-in-law named Einion, but this was Einion o'r Porth, the son of Einion Clud, and ruler of Elfael.

In 1182, however, Rhys and William de Braose made a peace agreement, with Rhys' son, Gruffydd, being wed to William's daughter. They were on sufficiently friendly terms for William to be allowed to re-establish himself in Buellt.

Einion o'r Porth joined the Third Crusade in 1188, but was murdered upon his return by his brother Gwalter, who seized Elfael. Einion's cousin, Maelgwn ap Cadwallon, was the ruler of the adjacent state of Maelienydd, and used his forces to destroy Rhayader castle, while William de Braose (who was sheriff of Hereford) brought his forces against Elfael; Gwalter was successfully deposed. Rhys rebuilt the castle in 1194.

In 1196, Rhys died, leading to a succession dispute between Gruffydd and his older bastard brother, Maelgwn ap Rhys. Although traditional Welsh law allowed acknowledged bastards to inherit, Rhys had wanted to follow the English practice, and pass Deheubarth to his eldest legitimate son, Gruffydd. Rhayader Castle was again destroyed.

Gwenwynwyn ab Owain, heir of Powys Wenwynwyn, was an ally of Maelgwn ap Rhys, and invaded the lands to the immediate south of Powys Wenwynwyn - Arwystli, Cedewain, and Maelienydd. King Richard I, already unhappy with hegemonic behaviour by Gwenwynwyn, and Rhys before him, gave troops to Roger Mortimer, a nearby magnate, who used them to conquer Maelienydd, and push Gwenwynwyn back to Powys Wenwynwyn. Gwenwynwyn was expelled from Rhayader by them in about 1200. Mortimer either rebuilt or started a new building on the site, but records indicate that it was captured two years later by the welsh; they do not say whether it was by Maelgwn's forces or Gwenwynwyn's.

In 1230, Ralph Mortimer, the son of Roger, married the daughter of Llywelyn Fawr. The following year, Llywelyn destroyed Rhayader castle, and it was not rebuilt. The remnants are a Scheduled Ancient Monument.

The surviving motte is a roughly rectangular flat-topped mound about 40 by 50 metres (130 by 160 ft). Approaches to the castle were protected by steep slopes or crags above the river on the north-west and southern sides. A rock-cut ditch at least 4 metres (13 ft 1 in) deep and up to 10 metres (33 ft) wide defended the other sides. This ditch is the only visible remnant of the fortifications.
