= Ffernfael =

Ffernfael (also spelt Fernmail and many, many variants) is a Welsh male given name. It may refer to:

- "Farinmagil", a 6th-century king who fell at Deorham
- Ffernfael ab Idwal, 8th-century king of Gwent
- Ffernfael ap Meurig, 9th-century king of Gwent
- Ffernfael ap Tewdwr, 9th-century king of Buellt and Gwytheyrnion
