= Dafydd Goch Brydydd o Fuallt =

16th century Welsh poet

Dafydd Goch Brydydd o Fuallt was a 16th-century Welsh poet. He is thought to have been from the Builth area. His works are known to include poems written to Gruffydd Fychan (of Cors y Gedol), Sir John Salusbury, and Sir John Wynn (of Gwydir).
