= Armorial of local councils in Wales =

This is a list of the coats of arms of the local authorities in Wales.

== Principal areas (1996-present) ==
Since 1996, Wales has been divided into 22 principal areas, variously styled as counties or county boroughs.

Council	Arms	Granted
Blaenau Gwent County Borough Council	Coat of arms of Blaenau Gwent	13 November 1975
Bridgend County Borough Council	(Escutcheon)	21 December 1977
Caerphilly County Borough Council	(Escutcheon)	1996
County Council of the City and County of Cardiff	Coat of arms of Cardiff	6 October 1906
Carmarthenshire County Council	Coat of arms of Carmarthenshire	28 August 1935
Ceredigion County Council	Coat of arms of Ceredigion	21 October 1937
Conwy County Borough Council		
Denbighshire County Council	Coat of arms of Denbighshire	1996
Flintshire County Council	Coat of arms of Flintshire	12 May 1938
Gwynedd Council	(Escutcheon)	Inherited from the former Gwynedd County Council (1974–1996).
Isle of Anglesey County Council	Coat of arms of Anglesey	9 April 1954
Merthyr Tydfil County Borough Council	Coat of arms of Merthyr Tydfil	1906
Monmouthshire County Council	Coat of arms of Monmouthshire	28 January 1948
Neath Port Talbot County Borough Council		
Newport City Council (known as Newport County Borough Council 1996–2002)	Coat of arms of Newport	17 April 1929; supporters granted 7 May 1958
Pembrokeshire County Council	Coat of arms of Pembrokeshire	11 October 1937
Powys County Council	Coat of arms of Powys	2 March 1984
Rhondda Cynon Taf County Borough Council		
City and County of Swansea Council	Coat of arms of Swansea	22 October 1922
Torfaen County Borough Council	Coat of arms of Torfaen	29 May 1975
Vale of Glamorgan County Borough Council		10 September 1975
Wrexham County Borough Council		

== Preserved counties (1974-1996) ==
Between 1974 and 1996, Wales was divided into 8 counties, which were further divided into thirty-seven districts. In 1996 this two-tier system of local government was abolished and replaced with the current single-tier system of principal areas, mostly based on the formerly lower-tier districts. However, the former upper-tier counties have been "preserved" for the ceremonial purposes of lieutenancy and shrievalty.

Council	Arms	Notes
Clwyd County Council	Coat of arms of Clwyd	Granted 3 December 1974
Dyfed County Council	(Escutcheon)	
Gwent County Council	Coat of arms of Gwent	Inherited from the historic county of Monmouthshire, and then passed on to the present Monmouthshire County Council.
Gwynedd County Council (not to be confused with the present Gwynedd Council)	(Escutcheon)	Used by the former Gwynedd County Council (1974–1996), until it was divided into Anglesey, Conwy, and Caernarfonshire and Merionethshire, the latter of which was renamed back to Gwynedd (1996–present). Continues to be used by the present Gwynedd Council.
Mid Glamorgan County Council		
Powys County Council	Coat of arms of Powys	Granted 2 March 1984. Powys continues to exist as a unitary authority using the same arms.
South Glamorgan County Council	Coat of arms of South Glamorgan	
West Glamorgan County Council	Coat of arms of West Glamorgan	

== Administrative counties (1889-1974) ==
In 1889 a system of administrative counties was established in parallel to the 13 historic counties, which had been the main subdivisions of Wales since 1536. Between 1889 and 1974 some boroughs were elevated to county boroughs outside of the administrative counties (Cardiff and Swansea in 1889, Newport in 1891 and Merthyr Tydfil in 1908). The boundaries of the administrative counties gradually departed from those of the historic counties until they were replaced by a new system in 1974.

Council	Arms	Notes
Monmouthshire County Council (1889–1974)	Coat of arms of Monmouthshire	Granted 28 January 1948. Continues to be used by the present Monmouthshire County Council.
Glamorgan County Council (1889–1974)	(Escutcheon)	Granted 15 December 1950.
Carmarthenshire County Council (1889–1974)	Coat of arms of Carmarthenshire	Granted 28 August 1935; supporters granted 1997. Continues to be used by the present Carmarthenshire County Council.
Pembrokeshire County Council (1889–1974)	Coat of arms of Pembrokeshire	Granted 11 October 1937. Continues to be used by the present Pembrokeshire County Council.
Cardiganshire County Council (1889–1974)	Coat of arms of Cardiganshire	Granted 21 October 1937. Continues to be used by the present Ceredigion County Council
Brecknockshire County Council (1889–1974)	Coat of arms of Brecknockshire	Unofficial
Radnorshire County Council (1889–1974)	(Escutcheon)	Granted 21 November 1950.
Montgomeryshire County Council (1889–1974)	(Escutcheon)	Granted 23 January 1951.
Denbighshire County Council (1889–1974)	(Escutcheon)	Granted 12 March 1962.
Flintshire County Council (1889–1974)	Coat of arms of Flintshire	Granted 12 May 1938. Continues to be used by the present Flintshire County Council.
Merionethshire County Council (1889–1974)	(Escutcheon)	Granted March 1952.
Caernarvonshire County Council (1889–1974)	(Escutcheon)	Granted 1949. County was anglicised as Carnarvonshire prior to 1926.
Anglesey County Council (1889–1974)	Coat of arms of Anglesey	Granted 9 April 1954. Continues to be used by the present Isle of Anglesey County Council.

== See also ==
- Welsh heraldry
- Royal Badge of Wales
- Armorial of the United Kingdom
- Armorial of county councils of England
- Armorial of local councils in Scotland
