= Cynllibiwg =

Cynllibiwg (or some variation) was evidently a place name in early medieval Wales.

The earliest surviving reference to it is in the Historia Brittonum, which describes a marvelous spring in the regione of Cinlipiuc that has an abundance of fish despite not being fed by a stream. John Edward Lloyd notes that this Cinlipiuc appears to be one of the various district names created by adding the element -wg to a personal name, in this case an unknown Cunalipi or Cynllib. The Domesday Book refers to a place called Calcebuef, which rendered ten shillings; one editor suggests this is a corruption of Cynllibiwg and that it derives ultimately from the name of Saint Cynllo. However, Lloyd connects this name instead to the cantref of Buellt. The Red Book of the Exchequer, a mainly 13th-century compilation, mentions a region of seven cantrefs between the Severn and the Wye that had been known as Kenthlebiac during the time of Rhys ab Owain of Deheubarth (died 1078). This would place Cynllibiwg in the region later known as Rhwng Gwy a Hafren, but reveals nothing about its extent and nature. The editor suggests that seven cantrefs should be amended to three, perhaps Arwystli, Maelienydd, and Elfael; these are mentioned earlier in the list as part of Powys in the time of 'Meic Menbis', but no longer such.

It has been postulated as an early kingdom, but is not mentioned by the great majority of historians.
