= Tribes of Wales =

Medieval Welsh nobility genealogical lists

"The five royal tribes of Wales" and "The fifteen tribes of North Wales" refer to a class of genealogical lists which were compiled by Welsh bards in the mid-15th century. These non-identical lists were constructed on the premise that many of the leading Welsh families of their time could trace their descent to the "five royal tribes of Wales" or the "fifteen noble tribes of North Wales".

In the surviving manuscripts, the first occurrence of the "fifteen tribes of Gwynedd" is probably in parts written by Gutun Owain in National Library of Wales NLW Peniarth MS 131. The Welsh headings which stand above the pedigrees of Eunydd of Dyffryn Clwyd and Hwfa ap Cynddelw on p. 85 and the tribe of Gollwyn ap Tangno on p. 90 all read something like "one of the 15 tribes (llwyth)". A related list is found in British Library Add MS 14919, f. 121v.

A more developed example is to be found on two folios of a 16th or 17th-century manuscript in the British Library, Harley MS 1970, folios 34r-v, where the list is accompanied by a number of heraldic designs.

The basic idea of five regal and fifteen common (i.e. noble) tribes was later used by the antiquarian and genealogist Philip Yorke as a model for his Royal Tribes of Wales (1799).

== Five Royal tribes of Wales ==
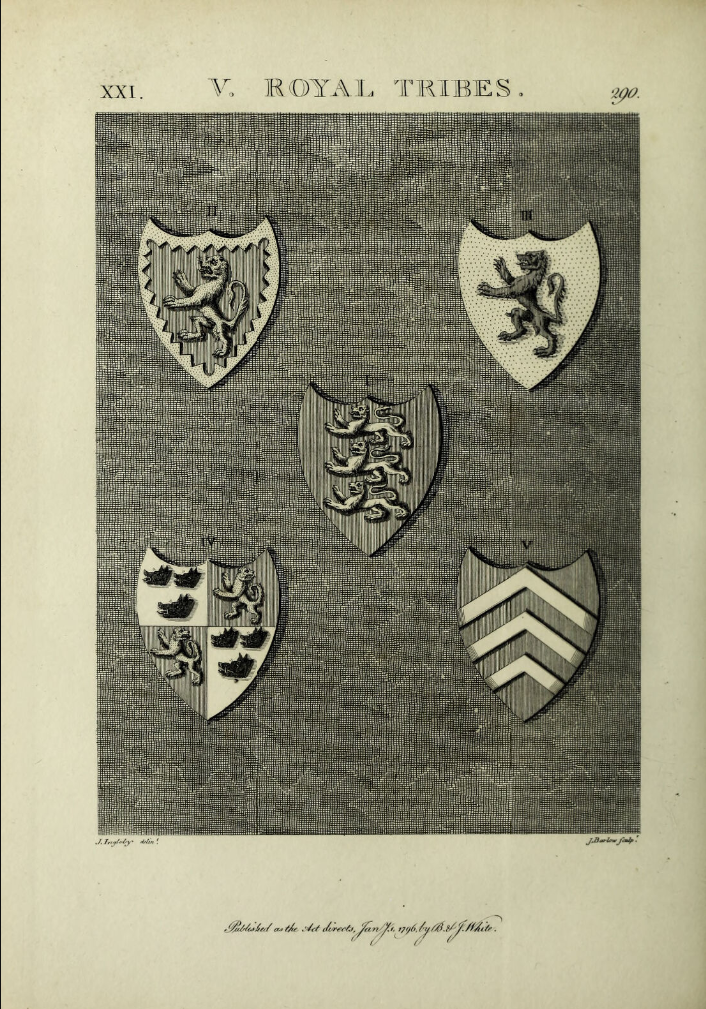
Coat of arms of the five royal tribes of Wales (Cambria) from the medieval era.

The Five Royal Tribes of Wales were recorded by Robert Vaughan in his book 'British Antiquities Revived', published in 1662. From the medieval ages, there were five royal figures identified in Wales who were the ancestors to many Welsh noble families, tracing their family descent through male and female lines.

=== Five royal tribes list ===
	Name	Location	Century	Royal title	Coat of Arms
1	Gruffudd ap Cynan	Gwynedd	1000-1100	King	
2	Rhys ap Tewdwr Mawr	South Wales	1000	King	
3	Bleddyn ap Cynfyn	Powys	1000	King	
4	Ethelystan Glodrydd	Wye and Severn	900-1000	Prince	
5	Iestyn ap Gwrgant	Glamorgan	1000	King	

== Fifteen tribes of Wales ==
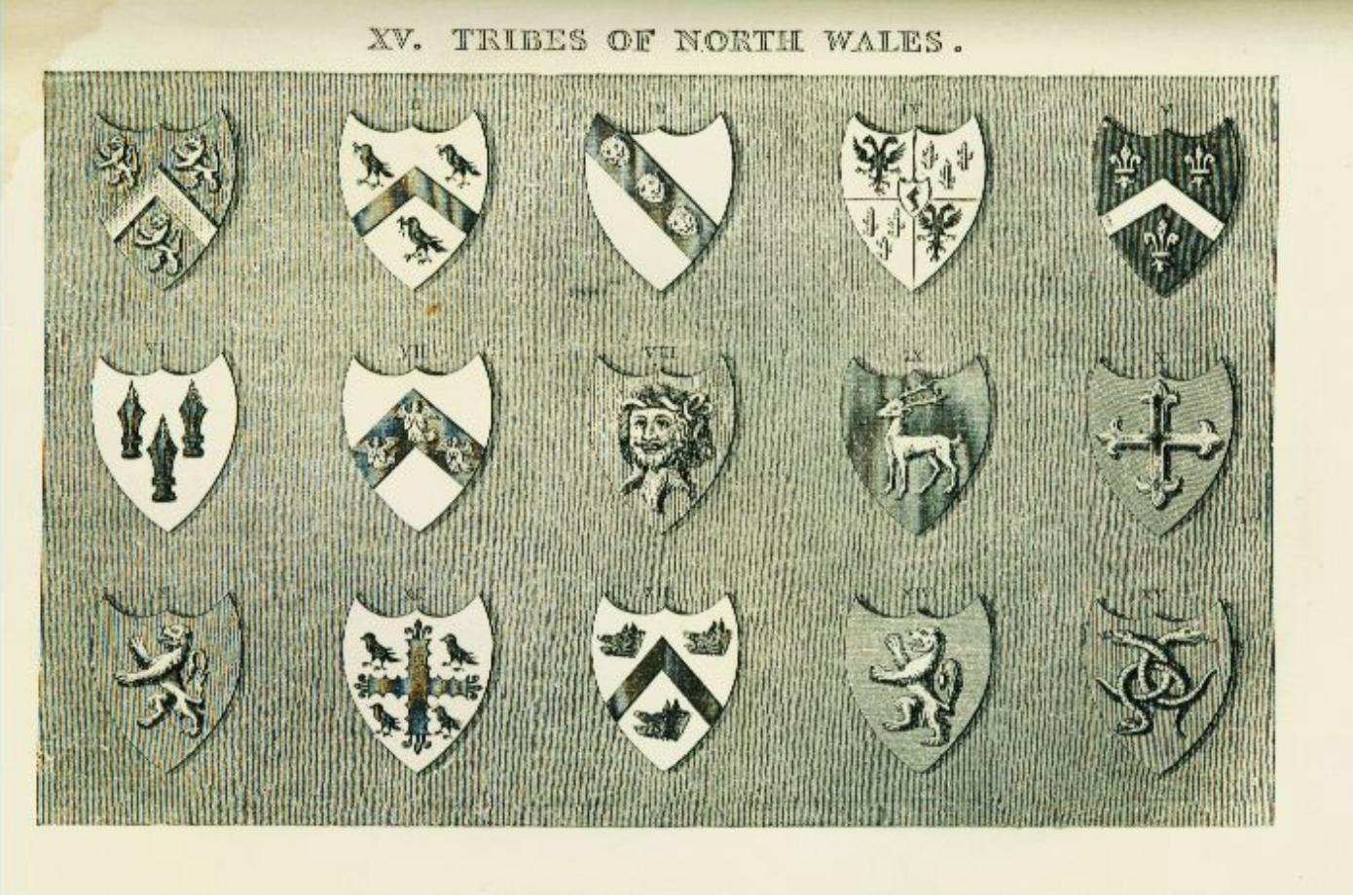
The coats of arms of the fifteen tribes of North Wales from the medieval era.

The origins of the Fifteen Tribes of Wales of North Wales, like the Five Royal Tribes, go back to 1493, when genealogists recorded the ancestry of Welsh folk from the medieval ages. The antiquary Robert Vaughan then recorded them in the mid-17th century. However, the list was not published until the release of the Cambrian Register in 1795 by either Dr. Owen Pughe or Walter Davies. Then later during the 1790s, both Thomas Pennant and Philip Yorke published works about the founders of Welsh tribes.

=== 15 tribes list ===
	Name	Location	Century	Royal ancestor	Coat of Arms
1	Hwfa ap Cynddelw	Anglesey	1100-1200	Cunedda	Hwfa ap Cynddelw
2	Llywarch ap Bran	Anglesey	1100-1200	Rhodri Mawr	
3	Gweirydd ap Rhys Goch	Anglesey	1100-1200	Cunedda	
4	Cilmin Troed-Ddu	Caernarvonshire	800-900	Coel Hen	
5	Collwyn ap Tangno	Merionethshire and Caernarvonshire	1000-1100	Cunedda	
6	Nefydd Hardd (Nefydd the Handsome)	Caernarvonshire	1100-1200	Cunedda	
7	Maelog Crwm (Maeloc the Bowed)	Caernarvonshire	1100-1200	Cunedda	
8	Marchudd ap Cynan	Caernarvonshire	800-900	Coel Hen	
9	Hedd Molwynog	Denbighshire	1100-1200	Rhodri Mawr	
10	Braint Hir (Braint the Tall)	Denbighshire	800-900	Rhychwyn the Bearded of Rhos or nephew of Cadwallon ap Cadfan	
11	Marchweithian	Denbighshire	1000-1100	Coel Hen	
12	Edwin ap Tegaingl	Flintshire	1000-1100	Gronw ap Einion ab Owen ap Hywel Dda ap Cadell ap Rhodri Mawr	
13	Ednowain Bendew (Ednowain the Strong-head)	Flintshire	1000-1100	Beli Mawr	
14	Eunydd of Gwerngwy	Denbighshire	1000-1100	Rhys ap Marchan, descended from Coel Hen	
15	Ednowain ap Bradwen	Merionethshire	1100-1200	Coel Hen	

== Books ==
- Bartrum, Peter C. (1962). "Hen Lwythau Gwynedd a'r Mars" [The Old Tribes of Gwynedd]. National Library of Wales Journal. 12: 201–235.
- Bartrum, Peter C. (1983). Welsh Genealogies. A.D. 300–1400: Welsh Genealogies A.D. 1400–1500. Aberystwyth: National Library of Wales. ISBN 0907158080.
- Pennant, Thomas (1796). The history of the parishes of Whiteford, and Holywell. pp. 283–317.
- Siddons, Michael Powell (1991). The Development of Welsh Heraldry. Vol. 1. Aberystwyth: National Library of Wales. ISBN 090715851X.
- Siddons, Michael (2006). "Genealogies [2] Welsh". In Koch, John T. (ed.). Celtic Culture: A Historical Encyclopedia. Santa Barbara, Denver, and Oxford: ABC-CLIO. pp. 800–2.
- Yorke, Philip (1799). The Royal Tribes of Wales. Wrexham.
