= Armorial of county councils of England =

This is a list of the coats of arms of various county councils (current and former) in England.

== Background ==
Under heraldic law in England, arms are not granted to places as such, but only to the corporate bodies that govern them. Accordingly, although arms and devices were associated with counties from the seventeenth century onward, there were no official grants until the establishment of county councils in 1889.

== History ==
=== First grants ===
The first grant was made to West Sussex County Council soon after its establishment in 1889. The cost of the grant was defrayed by the Duke of Norfolk, titular head of the College of Arms, who was also first chairman of the county council. Further grants were made over the years, the number greatly increasing after the passing of the Local Government Act 1929 when county councils gained extra powers. Following the Second World War the majority of non-armigerous county councils obtained grants. When Durham County Council received a grant of arms in 1961 (it had previously been using the arms of the Diocese of Durham) only Hampshire County Council was left without an official grant.

=== Changes in 1965 ===
Changes to local government in 1965 meant that several arms became obsolete and new arms had to be granted to Greater London, Cambridgeshire and Isle of Ely and Huntingdon and Peterborough.

=== Changes in 1974 ===
Local government in England and Wales was completely reorganised in 1974, with all existing county councils abolished. In their place was established a system of metropolitan and non-metropolitan county councils. Some of the non-metropolitan counties were identical or very similar in area to the previous administrative counties, and in their case they could apply for the transfer of the arms of the previous county councils by Order in Council. In some other cases, where substantial alterations were made to the county council's area, the College of Arms granted arms very similar to the previous arms, with a number of changes introduced. In the metropolitan counties, and entirely new non-metropolitan counties such as Avon, Humberside and Cleveland; new arms had to be designed. The arms of two small county councils were transferred to Huntingdon and Rutland district councils.

=== Changes in 1986 ===
The six metropolitan county councils (five of which had arms) and the Greater London Council were abolished in 1986 and their arms became obsolete.

=== Changes after 1996 ===
By 1995 all the remaining non-metropolitan county councils were using official arms, the last being Dorset, to whom the predecessor Dorset County Council's arms were transferred on 24 February of that year. From 1996 a piecemeal reform of local government meant the abolition of a number of county councils. It also recreated Worcestershire county council, who regained the use of the former county council arms. The unitary authority of Herefordshire, a county for ceremonial purposes, also gained the use of the old county council arms. Among the unitary authorities created was East Riding of Yorkshire. However this had a very different area to the pre 1974 East Riding and so was not allowed to take over the old arms. The council did obtain a grant of new arms. Rutland district became a unitary authority and ceremonial county, retaining the coat of arms that had been transferred from the previous county council.

== Use of the arms ==
The arms were granted to the councils of the county, and not to the county in general. This means that they can only be used by the council itself, who cannot allow another body or individual the use of their arms. However, many county councils have an additional heraldic badge which they can license organisations associated with the county to use.

The accepted practice is that it is permissible to illustrate the arms of a county council subject to copyright of the illustrator. In this case they should be clearly labelled as the arms of the county council.

== Current ==
=== Non-metropolitan county councils ===
There are 25 two-tier county councils remaining in England after a series of reforms.

Council	Image	Granted
Cambridgeshire County Council		Created 1976
Derbyshire County Council	Coat of arms	Transferred 1974; Crest and supporters added 1976
Devon County Council	Coat of arms	Transferred 1975
East Sussex County Council	Coat of arms	Created 1975
Essex County Council	Coat of arms	Transferred 1974
Gloucestershire County Council		Transferred 1976
Hampshire County Council		Created 1992
Hertfordshire County Council		Transferred 1974
Kent County Council	Coat of arms	Transferred 1975
Lancashire County Council	Coat of arms	Transferred 1974
Leicestershire County Council	Coat of arms	Transferred 1974
Lincolnshire County Council	Coat of arms	Created 1977
Norfolk County Council	Coat of arms	Transferred 1974; Supporters added 1992
Nottinghamshire County Council	Coat of arms	Transferred 1977
Oxfordshire County Council	Coat of arms	Created 1976
Staffordshire County Council		Transferred 1975
Suffolk County Council	Coat of arms	1978
Surrey County Council	Coat of arms	Created 1974
Warwickshire County Council	Coat of arms	Transferred 1975
West Sussex County Council	Coat of arms	Created 1975
Worcestershire County Council (created 1998)	Coat of arms	Transferred 1998

=== Transferred from county council to unitary authorities ===
Council	Image	Granted	Notes
Buckinghamshire Council		The council agreed to apply for a new coat of arms from the College of Arms in November 2021.	County Council, became Unitary in 2020.
Bristol City Council		Transferred 1974	District Council, became Unitary in 1996.
Cornwall Council		Transferred 1975	County Council, became Unitary in 2009.
Cumberland Council		1951 (Note: Tentative as to if the 2023-district will adopt the old arms)	County Council abolished in 1974, revived Unitary in 2023.
Dorset Council		Transferred 2019	County Council, became Unitary in 2019. Crest (granted in 2009) not shown.
Durham County Council	Coat of arms	1974	County Council, became Unitary in 2009.
East Riding of Yorkshire Council	Coat of arms	1996	County Council abolished in 1974, revived Unitary in 1996.
Herefordshire Council		Transferred 1998	County Council abolished in 1974, revived Unitary in 1998.
Isle of Wight Council		Transferred 1975	County Council, became Unitary in 1995.
Northumberland County Council	Coat of arms	Transferred 1974	County Council, became Unitary in 2009.
North Yorkshire Council	Coat of arms	Created 1980, Transferred 2023	County Council, became Unitary in 2023.
Rutland County Council		Transferred 1974	District Council, became Unitary in 1997.
Shropshire Council		Transferred 1974	County Council, became Unitary in 2009.
Somerset Council		Transferred 1974; Crest and supporters added 2003 (Note: Tentative as to if the 2023-district will adopt the old arms)	County Council, became Unitary in 2023.
Wiltshire Council		Transferred 1976	County Council, became Unitary in 2009.

== Obsolete ==
=== County Councils (1889–1974) ===
Council	Image	Granted
Bedfordshire		1951
Berkshire		1947, supporters granted in 1961.
Buckinghamshire		1948
Cambridgeshire (abolished 1965)		1914
Cambridgeshire and Isle of Ely (created 1965)		1965
Cheshire		1938
Cornwall		1939
Cumberland		1951
Derbyshire		1937
Devon		1926, supporters and crest granted 1962.
Dorset		1950
County Durham		1961
Essex		1932
Gloucestershire		1935
Hampshire		No Arms Granted
Herefordshire		1946
Hertfordshire		1926
Huntingdonshire (abolished 1965)		1937
Huntingdon and Peterborough (created 1965)		1965
Isle of Ely (abolished 1965)		1931
Isle of Wight		1938
Kent		1933
Lancashire		1903
Leicestershire		1930
Lincolnshire, Parts of Holland		1954
Lincolnshire, Parts of Kesteven		1950
Lincolnshire, Parts of Lindsey		1935
London (abolished 1965)		1914
Middlesex (abolished 1965)		1910
Norfolk		1904
Northamptonshire		1939
Northumberland		1951
Nottinghamshire		1937
Oxfordshire		1949
Rutland		1950
Shropshire		1896
Soke of Peterborough (abolished 1965)		1950
Somerset		1911
Staffordshire		1931
East Suffolk		1935
West Suffolk		1959
Surrey		1934
East Sussex		1937
West Sussex		1889
Warwickshire		1931
Westmorland		1926
Wiltshire		1937
Worcestershire		1947
Yorkshire, East Riding		1945
Yorkshire, North Riding		1928
Yorkshire, West Riding		1927

=== Greater London Council (1965–1986) ===
Council	Image	Granted
Greater London Council		1965

=== Non-Metropolitan County Councils ===
Council	Image	Granted
Avon (abolished 1996)		1976
Bedfordshire (abolished 2009)		Transferred 1975
Berkshire (abolished 1998)		New Arms 1974
Cheshire (abolished 2009)		Transferred 1976
Cleveland (abolished 1996)		1974
Cumbria (abolished 2023)	Coat of arms	Created 1974
Dorset		Transferred 1995. Crest granted 2009. (not shown)
Hereford and Worcester (abolished 1998)		1978
Humberside (abolished 1996)		1976
Northamptonshire (abolished 2021)	Coat of arms	Transferred 1975

=== Metropolitan County Councils (1974–1986) ===
Council	Image	Granted	Article
Greater Manchester		1974	Arms of Greater Manchester
Merseyside			
South Yorkshire		1978	
Tyne and Wear		No Arms Granted	
West Midlands			
West Yorkshire		1975	Arms of West Yorkshire

== See also ==
- List of county councils in England
- Counties of England
- History of local government in England
- Armorial of the United Kingdom
- Armorial of local councils in Scotland
- Armorial of local councils in Wales

== Sources ==
- A. C. Fox-Davies, The Book of Public Arms, 1915
- C. W. Scott-Giles, Civic Heraldry of England and Wales, 1953
- G. Briggs, Civic and Corporate Heraldry, 1971
- The Local Authorities (Armorial Bearings) Order 1974
- The Local Authorities (Armorial Bearings) Order 1975
- The Local Authorities (Armorial Bearings) Order 1976
- The Local Authorities (Armorial Bearings) Order 1977
- The Local Authorities (Armorial Bearings) (No. 2) Order 1997
