= Iorwerth Hirflawdd =

Iorwerth Hirflawdd was an ancestor of various medieval rulers in mid Wales. His epithet means 'long trouble', but nothing is known of how he acquired it, nor otherwise of his life.

Nothing is known certainly of his life, but he must have lived in the mid 9th century. Elystan Glodrydd (died c.1010), who is regarded as the founder of the fifth Royal Tribe of Wales, was seventh in descent from him. He also appears near the head of a dynasty of Arwystli, where he is named as son of Tegonwy ap Teon. Tegonwy also appears in the genealogy of Bleddyn ap Cynfyn, who was the ancestor of the later Princes of Powys. Bleddyn's claim to rule came from his father Cynfyn, being a Powys nobleman, Interim King of Powys and maternal grandson of the former King Cadell.
