= Armorial of local councils in Scotland =

The Armorial of local councils in Scotland lists 46 heraldic coats of arms organised according to type of council, whether Regional, Island, City District, or Other. Each entry includes the name of the geographic area represented and a blazon (description in highly stylised heraldic language). Many entries include a mention of the shield supporter(s) and an image of the herald; some include a motto.

== Area Councils (1996-present) ==
There are 32 council areas in Scotland, each controlled by a council which is the local government authority.

Image	Council	Granted	Details
	Aberdeen City Council		
-	Aberdeenshire Council		
	Angus Council		
	Argyll and Bute Council		
	Clackmannanshire Council		
	Dumfries and Galloway Council		
	Dundee City Council		
	East Ayrshire Council		
	East Dunbartonshire Council		
	East Lothian Council		
-	East Renfrewshire Council		
	The City of Edinburgh Council		
	Falkirk Council		
	Fife Council		
	Glasgow City Council		
	The Highland Council		
	Inverclyde Council		
	Midlothian Council		
	The Moray Council		
	Comhairle nan Eilean Siar		
	North Ayrshire Council		
	North Lanarkshire Council		
	Orkney Islands Council		
	Perth and Kinross Council		
	Renfrewshire Council		
	Scottish Borders Council		
	Shetland Islands Council		
	South Ayrshire Council		
	South Lanarkshire Council		
	Stirling Council		
	West Dunbartonshire Council		
	West Lothian Council		

== Regional Councils (1975-1996) ==
A heraldic template was set for all of these councils comprising a special coronet (a circlet richly chased from which are issuant four thistles leaved (one and two halves visible) Or) and sinister supporter (a unicorn argent). The Strathclyde council was never granted arms.

Image	Details
	Borders Blazon: Azure a saltire Argent surmounted at the fess point by an inescutcheon Gules fimbriated Or and charged with four barrulets wavy Argent between in chief a salmon naiant and in base a ram's head cabossed Proper a bordure counter-compony of the first and second. Dexter supporter: A border knight.
	Central Blazon: Azure a saltire Argent surmounted at the fess point by an inescutcheon Gules fimbriated Or and charged with two caltraps in chief and a dexter mailed gauntlet paleways in base all Or a bordure counter-compony of the first and second. Dexter supporter: A goshawk.
	Dumfries and Galloway Blazon: Azure a saltire Argent surmounted at the fess point by an inescutcheon Gules fimbriated Or and charged with a lion rampant Argent crowned Or a bordure counter-compony of the first and second. Dexter supporter: A stag Proper.
	Fife Blazon: Argent a knight armed at all points on a horse at full speed in his dexter hand a sword erect all Proper his surcoat Argent on his sinister hand a shield Or charged with a lion rampant Gules the visor of his helmet shut over which the wreath of his liveries with a mantling of the fourth doubled of the third is set a lion rampant issuing out of the wreath of the fourth the caparisons of the horse of the last fimbriated of the third and thereon six shields of the last each charged with a lion rampant of the fourth. Dexter supporter: St Servanus vested Argent.
	Grampian Blazon: Azure a saltire Argent surmounted at the fess point by an inescutcheon Gules fimbriated Or and charged with a cross-crosslet fitchee Or a bordure counter-compony of the first and second. Dexter supporter: A Ptarmigan Proper.
	Highlands Blazon: Azure a saltire Argent surmounted at the fess point by an inescutcheon Gules fimbriated Or and charged with a star Argent a bordure counter-compony of the first and second. Dexter supporter: A stag Proper.
	Lothian Blazon: Azure a saltire Argent surmounted at the fess point by an inescutcheon Gules fimbriated Or and charged with a sun in splendour Or a bordure counter-compony of the first and second. Dexter supporter: A lion rampant Vert armed and langued Gules.
	Tayside Blazon: Azure a saltire Argent surmounted at the fess point by an inescutcheon Gules fimbriated Or and charged with a fleur de lis Argent and in chief a bar wavy of the last a bordure counter-compony of the first and second. Dexter supporter: An Angus bull Proper.

== Island Councils (1975-1996) ==
The island councils used the same supporter but their crown was four dolphins two and two respectant naiant (two visible) Or.

Image	Details
	Orkney Blazon: Parted per pale Azure and Gules in the dexter a dragon galley Or sails furled Argent and in the sinister a lion rampant imperially crowned Or armed and langued Azure holding in its forepaws a battleaxe erect in pale Gold. Dexter supporter: A fifteenth-century Udallerer. Motto: Boreas Domus Mare Amicus
	Shetland Blazon: Azure a base invected barry Argent and Sable the alternate party lines being engrailed and plain a dragon ship Or the sail charged with a raven Proper oars in action Or flag and mast Gules. Dexter supporter: A Shetland pony Proper. Motto: Med Logum Skal Land Byggia
	Western Isles Blazon: Or on a fess wavy Azure between three lymphads oars in action sails furled Sable flagged Gules two barrulets wavy Argent. Dexter supporter: An eagle Proper. Motto: Ardaichidh Fireantachd Cinneach

== City District Councils (1975-1996) ==
The city district council crown was a circlet richly chased from which were issuant eight thistle heads (three and two halves visible) Or.

Image	Details
	Aberdeen Blazon: Gules three towers triple-towered within a double tressure flowered and counterflowered Argent. Supporters: Two leopards Proper. Motto: Bon Accord
	Dundee Blazon: Argent a pot of three growing lilies Argent. Crest: A lily Argent. Supporters: Two dragons wings elevated their tails knowed together underneath Vert. Motto: Prudentia Et Candore
	Edinburgh Blazon: Argent a castle triple-towered and embattled Sable masoned of the first and topped with three fans Gules windows and portcullis shut of the last situated on a rock Proper. Crest: An anchor wreathed about with a cable all Proper. Supporters: Dexter a maid richly attired with her hair hanging down her shoulders and on the sinister a doe Proper. Motto: Nisi Dominus Frustra
	Glasgow Blazon: Argent on a mount in base Vert an oak tree Proper the stem at the base thereof surmounted by a salmon on its back also Proper with a signet ring in its mouth Or on the top of the tree a redbreast and in the sinister fess point an ancient hand bell both also Proper. Crest: The half-length figure of St Kentigern affrontee vested and mitred his right hand raised in the act of benediction and having in his left hand a crosier all Proper. Supporters: Two salmon Proper each holding in its mouth a signet ring Or. Motto: Let Glasgow Flourish

== Other District Councils (1975-1996) ==
There were District Councils within the regions.

Image	Details
Borders Region
	Berwickshire Blazon: Argent on a mount Vert a bear Sable collared and chained Or standing in front of a tree Proper.
	Ettrick & Lauderdale Blazon: Argent on a mount in base a stag lodged reguardant in front of an oak tree all Proper the tree charged of an inescutcheon of the arms of the Earl of Lauderdale (Or a lion rampant Gules couped at all his joints of the field within the Royal Tressure Azure). Motto: Leal To The Border
	Roxburgh Blazon: Azure a unicorn salient Argent horned maned and unguled Or the tail tufted Or on a chief Argent a hunting horn Sable stringed and viroled Gules between two esquires' helmets of the field. Motto: Ne Cede Malis Sed Contra Audentior Ito
	Tweeddale Blazon: Quarterly 1st Sable five fraises Argent 2nd Azure a horse's head couped Argent 3rd Vert a golden fleece 4th Or fretty Gules a chief embattled Gules charged with two thunderbolts Or. Motto: Onward Tweeddale Motto: Leal To The Border
Central Region
	Clackmannanshire Blazon: Or a saltire Gules a chief tierced per pale 1st Vert sinister gauntlet 3rd also Vert a dexter gauntlet both Proper 2nd Argent a pale Sable. Motto: Look Aboot Ye
	Falkirk Blazon: Quarterly 1st Sable a bend bretessed accompanied by six billets Or three in chief and three in base 2nd Gules a stag's head erased with a cross-crosslet fitchee between the attires Or 3rd per pale Gules and Sable in a sea in base undy Argent and Azure a three-masted ship of the 17th century Or in full sail Proper flagged Gold 4th per fess engrailed Azure and Vert in chief a demi-angel Proper attired Argent wings displayed Or and celestially crowned Or holding in either hand a palm branch Vert and in base a bend wavy Argent charged with a bendlet wavy Azure. Motto: Ane For A'
	Stirling Blazon: Azure on a saltire between two caltraps in chief and base and as many spur rowels in the flanks Argent a lion rampant Gules armed and langued of the first.
Dumfries and Galloway Region
	Annandale & Eskdale Blazon: Or on a saltire Gules a golden fleece Or on a chief Gules a bar wavy Argent charged with two barrulets wavy Azure. Motto: Quinque Uniter
150px	Nithsdale Blazon: Argent a double-headed eagle displayed Sable beaked and membered Gules surmounted of an escutcheon Argent charged with a saltire Sable and surcharged in the centre with a hurcheon Or within a bordure Gules charged with five estoiles Or on a chief wavy Azure and endorse Or between dexter the demi-figure of the Archangel Michael wings expanded brandishing in his dexter hand a sword all Proper and on his sinister arm an escutcheon Argent charged with a cross Gules and sinister on a rock in base Proper a double-leaved gate Gules triple-towered on an ascent of five steps flanked by two towers all Argent towers arch-roofed and masoned Sable vanes Gules. Motto: Reviresco
	Stewartry Blazon: Azure a lion rampant Argent armed and langued Gules crowned with an antique crown Or surmounted of a bar chequy Argent and Vert.
	Wigtown Blazon: Per pale indented dexter Azure a lion rampant Argent armed and langued Gules crowned with an antique crown Or and gorged of an antique crown Vert sinister Gules a chevron Argent and issuing from the sinister chief a quadrant of the sun arrayed Or on a chief Azure having a fillet Ermine a saltire Or charged with nine lozenges also Azure.
Fife Region
	Dunfermline Blazon: Azure on a rock Proper two lions supporting a tower with four steps Argent masoned sable windows and portcullis Gules. Motto: Esto Rupes Inaccessa
	Kirkcaldy Blazon: Azure an abbey of three pyramids Argent each charged with a cross pattee Or between in chief dexter a garb and sinister a buckle and in base a lymphad sails furled oars in action all Or. Motto: Vigilando Munio
	North East Fife Blazon: Quarterly 1st Gules three crowns of myrtle Or 2nd Argent on a mount in base the figure of St Andrew Proper bearing his cross in front of him Argent 3rd Argent on a base undy Azure and Argent a lymphad sails furled Sable flagged Gules 4th Gules in chief a garb Or banded Vert in base a plough also or share Argent. Motto: Steadfast
Highland Region
	Badenoch & Strathspey Blazon: Or an osprey volant grasping a fish in its talons Proper a chief wavy per pale dexter Azure a boar's head couped Or and sinister Gules an antique crown also Or a bar wavy enhanced per fess wavy Argent and Azure. Motto: Tre Oideas Agus Creideamh
	Caithness Blazon: Azure a galley Or the sail thereof Argent charged with a raven Sable and in chief two crosier heads Or. Motto: Wark To God
	Inverness Blazon: Per fess Azure and Gules a barrulet wavy enhanced Argent in base Our Lord upon the Cross Proper between a crescent and a mullet Or and in chief between dexter a cornucopia and sinister a fraise Argent on a pale or a cat saliant Proper. Motto: Concordia Et Fidelitas
	Lochaber Blazon: Argent two Lochaber axes heads upwards and blades outwards saltirewise intertwined with a chaplet of oak in chief an imperial crown all Proper. Motto: A Dh'Aindeoin Co Theireadh E
	Nairn Blazon: Azure a figure of St Ninian holding in his dexter hand an open book his crosier in his sinister hand and pendant from the wrist thereof a manacle all Proper between dexter a sun radiant Or and sinister a mullet Argent on a chief Or two water budgets Sable. Motto: United And Be Mindful
	Ross & Cromarty Blazon: Per fess Gules and Azure in chief three lions rampant Argent in base an endorse Argent between dexter a stag's head cabossed and sinister a sun in splendour between five mullets Or. Motto: Dread God And Do Well
	Skye & Lochalsh Blazon: Per fess in chief per pale Azure and Vert in base Azure in chief a pale Or charged of a lymphad sails furled and oards in action Sable flagged Gules all between dexter a castle triple-towered and embattled Argent masoned Sable windows and port Gules and sinister a boar's head erased holding in its mouth a shank-bone of a deer Argent and in base a stag's head cabossed Or overall on a fess wavy Argent a barrulet wavy Azure.
	Sutherland Blazon: Gules on a fess Argent between three mullets Or a horseshoe Azure having seven horsenails Or between two ravens respectant Sable. Motto: Dluth Lean Do Dhuthchas Le Durachd
Grampian Region
	Banff & Buchan Blazon: Argent a lion passant guardant Gules crowned with an antique crown Or on a chief wavy Azure three fish fretted Proper between two garbs of the third banded Vert.
	Gordon Blazon: Quarterly 1st Azure three boars' heads couped Or 2nd Or semee of torteaux an oak tree eradicated of then leaves Vert fructed of two acorns in fess Azure 3rd per fess Argent and Or a fess embattled in chief and wavy in base between in chief an otter passant guardant Sable and in base a boar's head erased between two crescents Gules 4th per fess Azure and Pean three garbs Or overall at the centre point a tower Or masoned Sable window and port Gules.
	Kincardine & Deeside Blazon: Gules the sword of state and sceptre of Scotland in saltire in chief the crown of Scotland Or a closet wavy reduced Azure fimbriated Argent on a base wavy Vert three pallets Or. Motto: Laus Deo
	Moray Blazon: Quarterly 1st & 4th Azure three mullets Argent 2nd & 3rd Argent three cushions within a double tressure flory-counterflory Gules. Motto: Sub Spe
Lothian Region
	East Lothian Blazon: Gules three bars Ermine over all a lion rampant Or armed and langued Azure.
	Midlothian Blazon: Or a lion rampant Vert armed and langued Gules surmounted of a fess Azure charged with three suns in splendour Or.
	West Lothian Blazon: Azure issuant from a mount in base an oak tree fructed all Or a bordure Argent charged with four gillyflowers Gules alternately with as many laurel leaves slipped Vert.
Strathclyde Region
	Argyll and Bute
	Bearsden and Milngavie
	Clydebank
	Clydesdale
	Cumbernauld and Kilsyth
	Cumnock and Doon Valley
	Cunninghame
	Dumbarton
	East Kilbride
	Eastwood
	Hamilton
	Inverclyde
	Kilmarnock and Loudoun
	Kyle and Carrick
	Monklands
	Motherwell
	Renfrew
	Strathkelvin
Tayside Region
	Angus Blazon: Quarterly 1st Argent a lion passant guardant Gules imperially crowned Or 2nd Gules a cinquefoil Or 3rd on a fess chequy Argent and Azure surmounted of a bend Gules charged with three buckles Or 4th Argent a man's heart Gules imperially crowned Or on a chief Azure three mullets Argent. Motto: Lippen On Angus
	Perth & Kinross Blazon: Or a lion rampant Gules armed and langued Azure standing on a compartment or mount Proper and brandishing in his dexter paw a scimitar of the last all within a double tressure flowered counter-flowered Gules on an inescutcheon Argent on an island Proper on a loch undy Azure and Argent a castle Proper. Motto: Pro Lege Et Libertate

== See also ==
- Local government in Scotland
- Subdivisions of Scotland
- Armorial of the United Kingdom
- Armorial of county councils of England
- Armorial of local councils in Wales
