= Elystan Glodrydd =

Welsh royal

Attributed arms of Elystan Glodrydd

Elystan Glodrydd (or, occasionally, Elstan Glodrydd; died c. 1010), also known as "Æthelstan the Famous" and "The Renowned," was, according to Welsh genealogical tracts, the founder of the fifth Royal Tribe of Wales. He was the Prince of Buellt, and later also of Fferreg (also known as Ferlix); in the century after his death, Fferreg split into Maelienydd and Elfael

Very little is known about Elystan himself, but his descendants, including Cadwallon ap Madog, continued to rule Ferlix, a minor principality in mid Wales, and the main part of Rhwng Gwy a Hafren—the land between the Wye and the Severn. An early Welsh genealogical tract links him to Gwrtheyrnion, while other descendants of Gwrtheyrnion ruled Maelienydd, Elfael., and Cedewain. These territories lay in an area roughly equivalent to the later counties of Radnorshire and southern Montgomeryshire, in today's county of Powys. It has been conjectured by historian Paul Remfry that these territories formed a polity known as Cynllibiwg. However, this is not generally accepted.

A Welsh genealogical source makes Elystan the seventh in descent from Iorwerth Hirflawdd, who probably died in the mid 9th century.

Elystan married either Gwenllian, daughter of Einon ap Owain, or Gwladis, daughter of Rhyn ap Ednowen, prince of Tegengl. One of his sons, Cadwgan, lord of Radnor, was the ancestor of the Cadogan family.
