= Rhwng Gwy a Hafren =

Welsh medieval region

Coordinates: 52.33°N 3.32°W

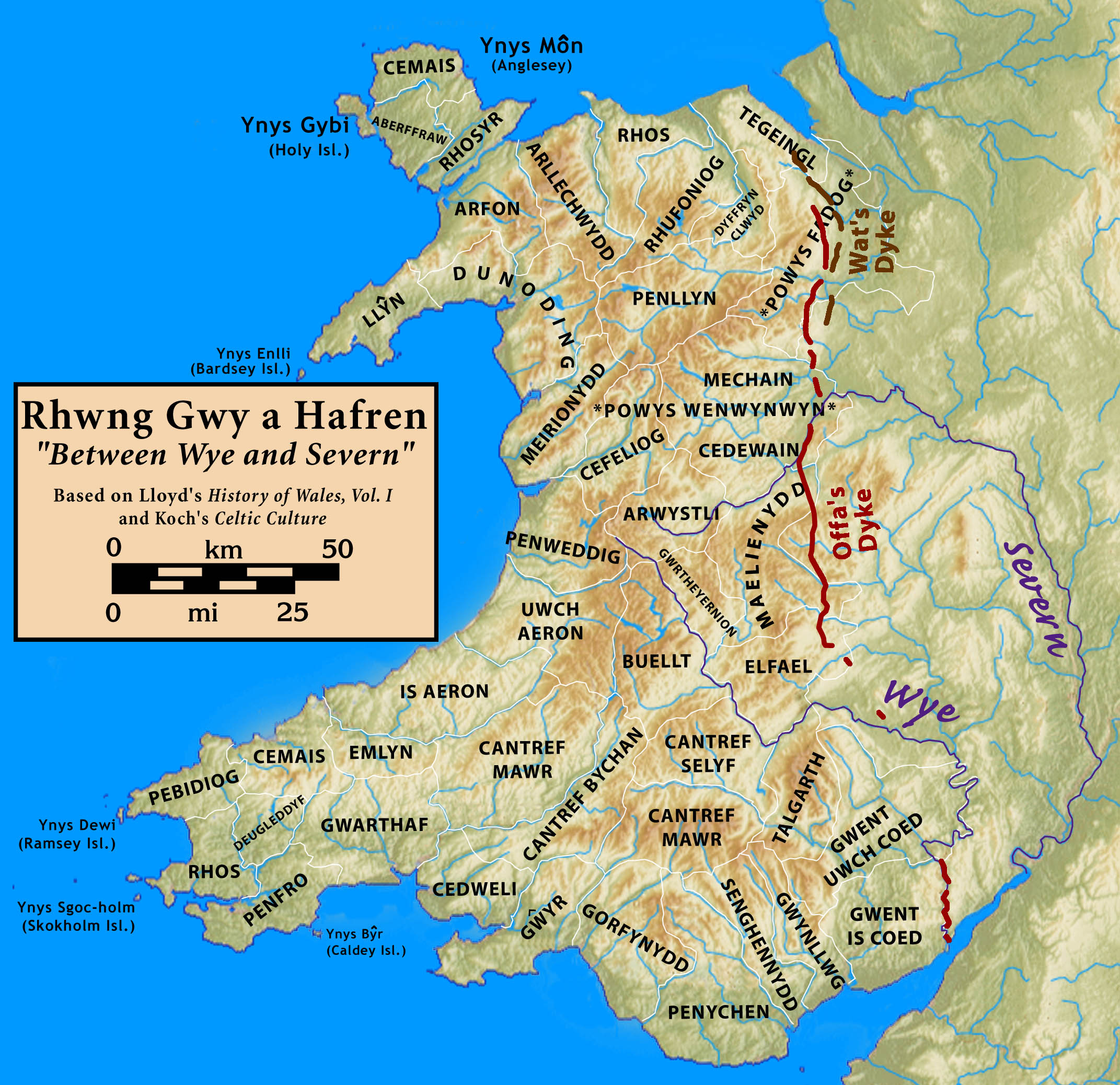
Map of medieval Wales, with the rivers Wye and Severn marked in purple, and Offa's Dyke in red.

Rhwng Gwy a Hafren (Welsh for 'between [the] Wye and Severn') was a region of medieval Wales, located in the Welsh Marches between Powys to the north and Brycheiniog to the south. It was bounded by the rivers Wye (Gwy) and Severn (Hafren). It covered about the same territory as Radnorshire, now part of the county of Powys. The region first came into its own in the 9th or 10th centuries, when it was ruled by leaders who operated independently of the surrounding kingdoms. After the Norman invasion, it comprised the central part of the Welsh Marches and was the site of frequent struggles between Welsh and Norman forces.

== Name and area ==
Map showing the possible cantrefs and commotes of Rhwng Gwy a Hafren discussed (Cwmwd Deuddwr is shown as Elenydd)

The name Rhwng Gwy a Hafren appears in various medieval lists of cantrefs and commotes, and is rendered in Latin in the works of Gerald of Wales. The name means "between the Wye and the Severn", and those two rivers were its most important boundaries. However, the territories associated with it are not always consistent: generally, the lists include the cantrefs of Elfael and Maelienydd and the commote of Gwrtheyrnion. The cantref of Buellt is also often associated with the region, despite being located across the Wye, and there is some conjecture that may tie in Arwystli as well. The small commotes of Ceri in Maelienydd and Cwmwd Deuddwr north of Buellt (and also across the Wye) were located in this area and appear in some sources, but are not included in the lists of divisions.

== History ==
In the Iron Age and the Roman era, Rhwng Gwy a Hafren made up part of the territory of the Ordovices. During the Early Middle Ages the region was evidently associated with the Kingdom of Powys, although in later centuries the monarchs of Powys exercised no control over it. After the 9th or 10th centuries, the region was ruled by families tracing their descent from the shadowy figures of Iorwerth Hirflawdd and his descendant Elystan Glodrydd. Although these families had lineal ties to Powys, they operated independently of the Powys monarchy. In the early 9th century another dynasty arose which formed Buellt and Gwerthrynion into an independent minor kingdom. The rulers of this kingdom did not trace their descent from the royal line of Powys, but from Pascent or Pasgen, a reputed son of the early king Vortigern. However the Powys connection was never totally forgotten. Welsh topographical lore remembered the traditional borders of Powys as extending to the Wye, while in 1176, Bishop Adam Parvipontanus tried to claim Ceri as part of his Diocese of St Asaph, apparently based on the old territorial claims of Powys over Rhwng Gwy a Hafren.

In 1093 much of the territory was divided up between the Marcher Lords, including Roger de Montgomerie, Ranulph de Mortimer, and Philip de Braose. Norman authority suffered a serious reverse within fifty years with the emergence of Cadwallon ap Madog and his younger brother Einion Clud as Princes of Elfael and Maelienydd. In 1165 Cadwallon and Einion Clud combined forces and marched with the rest of independent Wales to join the massed Welsh army under the leadership of Owain Gwynedd at Corwen, which humbled the army of Henry II of England. In 1175 these two brothers travelled to Gloucester with many of their compatriots from south Wales, as allies of the Lord Rhys ap Gruffudd of Deheubarth.

Throughout the 13th century the territory as described was gradually reoccupied by the English Marcher Lords, and Roger Mortimer built a castle at Cefnllys to consolidate his gains in Maelienydd. Descendants of Cadwallon and Einion Clud are recorded as holding client fortresses in the area until the 1240s, when they changed allegiance to support Llywelyn the Great and later his grandson Llywelyn ap Gruffudd. The territory was annexed by the latter in 1267 under the Treaty of Montgomery. However, following the defeat of the last native Prince of Wales at the hands of Edward I of England in 1282, most remaining native landowners in the area were dispossessed. The county of Radnorshire was formed out of the area under the various Tudor Laws in Wales Acts in the 16th century. Welsh language speakers formed the majority of the population until the end of the 19th century.

== Cynllibiwg ==
Some part of Rhwng Gwy a Hafren may have been known as Cynllibiwg (or some variation) during the Early Middle Ages. The Red Book of the Exchequer, a mainly 13th-century English compilation of landholdings, mentions a region of seven cantrefs "between Severn and Wye" that had been known as Kenthlebiac during the time of Rhys ab Owain of Deheubarth. This name is evidently attested in the 9th-century Historia Brittonum, which describes a marvellous spring in the regione of Cinlipiuc brimming with fish despite not being fed by a stream. The Domesday Book of 1086 refers to a place called Calcebuef, which rendered ten shillings; one editor suggests this is a corruption of Cynllibiwg and that it derives ultimately from the name of Saint Cynllo.

The extent of Cynllibiwg is unknown. Hubert Hall suggests that the number of cantrefs given in the Red Book of the Exchequer be amended from seven to three, perhaps Arwystli, Maelienydd, and Elfael. The Red Book mentions that these cantrefs were part of Powys in the time of "Meic Menbis", but were no longer such in the 13th century. Cynllibiwg has been postulated as an early kingdom, but is not mentioned by the great majority of historians.
