= Ffernfael ap Tewdwr =

Ffernfael ap Tewdwr (English: Ffernfael, son of Tewdwr; Old Welsh: Fernmail map Teudur; fl. c. 830) was a king of Buellt and Gwrtheyrnion in medieval Wales. Little is known of him besides a pedigree included in the 9th-century Historia Brittonum, which makes him a descendant of the ruler Vortigern.

== Life ==
Ffernfael is mentioned in a passage in the 9th-century work Historia Brittonum, which indicates his lordship of Buellt and Gwrtheyrnion and traces his descent from Vortigern and Pascent. His name apparently means "strong-ankles". The genealogy, which appears in every extant copy, makes him son of Tewdwr (Theodore), son of Pasgen (Pascent), son of Guodicator, son of Morwd, son of Eldad, son of Eldog, son of Pawl (Paul), son of Mepurit ("Mac Urit"), son of Bricad, son of Pasgen (Pascent), son of Gorthigern (Vortigern), son of Guitail (Vitalis), son of Guitoilin (Vitalinus), son of "Glou", the legendary eponym for Gloucester. He is also known from the later genealogies from Jesus College MS 20, which say that his cousin Brawstudd married Arthfael Hen ap Rhys of Morgannwg. Arthfael flourished around 800, implying that Ffernfael would have been active around that time as well. Thomas Charles-Edwards places his floruit around 830.

Though little is known of Ffernfael, the appearance of his pedigree in the Historia gives important clues about the authorship and date of the work. The author's emphasis on Ffernfael's dynasty and many references to southwestern Wales in general suggest the author was a native of the area, though writing in 9th-century Gwynedd.
