= Arwystli =

Welsh medieval cantref

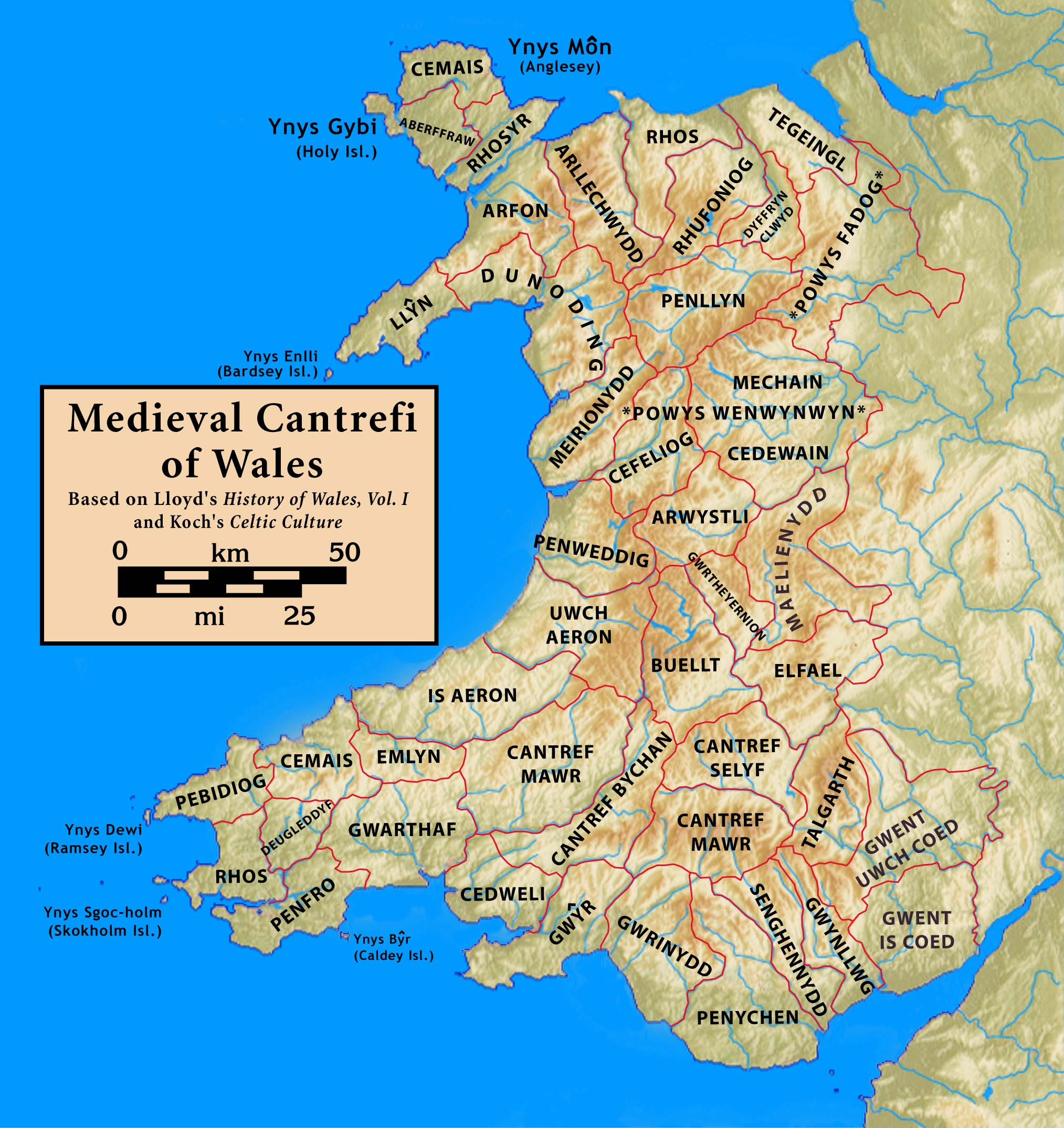
Map of Welsh cantrefs

Arwystli was a cantref in mid Wales in the Middle Ages, located in the headland of the River Severn. It was chiefly associated with the Kingdom of Powys, but was heavily disputed between Powys, Gwynedd, and the Norman Marcher Lords for hundreds of years, and was the scene of many skirmishes between those groups. Like many other cantrefs and subdivisions, it was divided up by the Laws in Wales Acts in the 16th century.

== Early history ==
During the Roman era Arwystli formed part of the territory of the Ordovices, the Celtic tribe that controlled much of northern Wales. It is unclear when it formed as a distinct unit, but the name itself derives from the personal name Arwystl, borne by a disciple of Dubricius. The first reference to Arwystli occurs in the 11th-century Domesday Book, where it appears as the "hundred of Arvester".

Though the cantref mostly consisted of inarable moorland, it did contain some valuable farmland in the river valleys and offered strategic access between Mid Wales and the Welsh Marches. At some point the cantref was subdivided into the commotes of Arwystli Is Coed and Arwystli Uwch Coed (Arwystli Below the Wood and Arwystli Above the Wood). Important settlements included Talgarth, Llandinam, Llanidloes, and Caersws. There is some conjecture that Arwystli may have been associated with the region known as Rhwng Gwy a Hafren (English: Between Wye and Severn). Hubert Hall suggests that it was one of the cantrefs of the obscure region once known as Cynllibiwg, located "between Severn and Wye", mentioned in the Red Book of the Exchequer.

== High Middle Ages ==
Map of Mediaeval kingdoms of Wales 700-1000

In earlier times Arwystli was evidently considered part of the Kingdom of Powys, but over time its local rulers established ties with Gwynedd. Significantly, the cantref became part of the Diocese of Bangor, which covered Gwynedd, rather than the Powys-centred Diocese of St Asaph. As such Arwystli was the scene of periodic bloody disputes between the two kingdoms. In the late 11th century it was taken by the Norman leader Roger de Montgomerie, though his claim to it was disputed by Robert of Rhuddlan, who controlled most of North Wales at the time. It remained in the hands of Roger's heirs until the earlier 12th century, when it was retaken by Welsh lords. Over the next centuries Powys and Gwynedd resumed their violent struggle, and the Arwystli dynasty changed allegiances several times.

The contention over Arwystli played an important role in the buildup to the 1283 conquest of Wales by Edward I of England. In 1263 Llywelyn ap Gruffudd, who ruled Gwynedd as Prince of Wales, approved the claim over Arwystli of Gruffydd ap Gwenwynwyn, Marcher Lord of the part of Powys known as Powys Wenwynwyn. In 1274, however, Llywelyn reversed his earlier decision, and claimed the cantref as part of his own Principality of Wales. Gruffydd protested, and in 1277 Llywelyn plead his case to Edward, his suzerain, hoping for a quick resolution. The 1277 Treaty of Aberconwy guaranteed that Edward would provide full consideration to Llywelyn under the law, and also that disputes be settled "according to the laws of Wales for cases arising in Wales". Llywelyn claimed that Arwystli was part of Wales, and as such the dispute must be settled by Welsh law, rather than the English common law of the Marches. Edward, however, used the case as a means to belittle the position of the Prince of Wales, insisting that Llywelyn must file his grievance as any other appellant, rather than receiving priority as one of the king's major vassals. This insult contributed to the widespread anti-royal sentiment that led to the revolt of 1282. After the conquest the following year, Edward upheld Gruffydd's claim, solidifying Powys' claim over Arwystli.

In the late 14th century Arwystli, along with the small lordships of Caereinion and Cyfeiliog, was taken from the Cherleton family by Edmund Mortimer. Edward Charleton retook the lost territories in 1403, during the Glyndŵr Rising. His heirs eventually sold it to the Crown in the time of Henry VIII. Henry's Laws in Wales Acts divided Arwystli into smaller manors, and the former cantref was reorganized as Arwystli Hundred, later known as Llanidloes Hundred. It was part of the historic county of Montgomeryshire until 1974, when the area became part of the new county of Powys.
