= Buellt =

Welsh medieval cantref

Cantref of Buellt Buellt
- Status: Cantref
- Capital: Llanafan Fawr
- Common languages: Old Welsh, Middle Welsh
- Religion: Christianity
- Government: Feudal monarchy / Autonomous dynasty
- King / Lord
- Historical era: Middle Ages
  - Established: 5th/6th century
  - Annexed by Edward I: 1282
Succeeded by
Principality of Wales
- Today part of: Wales (Powys)

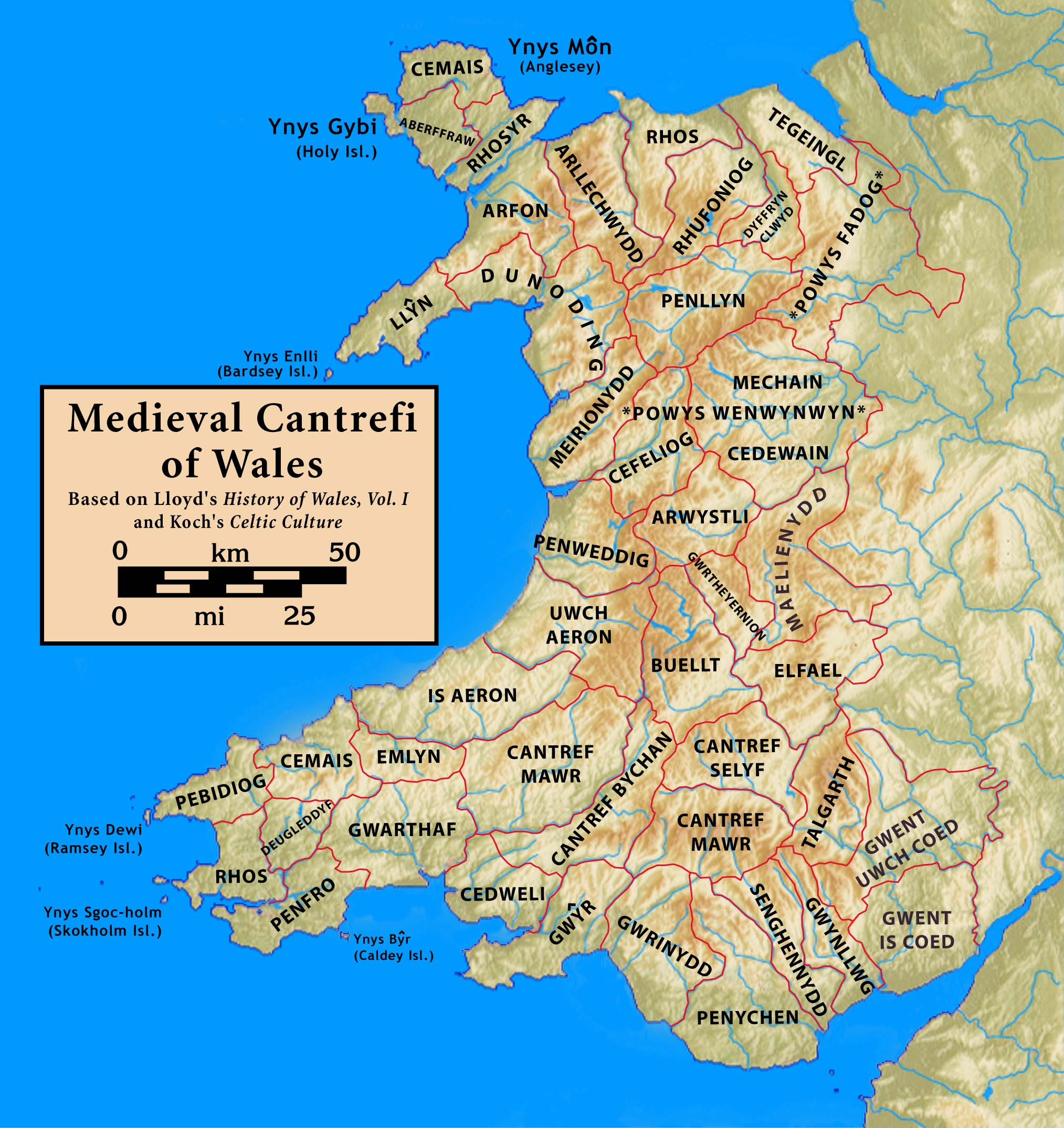
Map of the Welsh cantrefs, showing the location of Buellt, in the middle

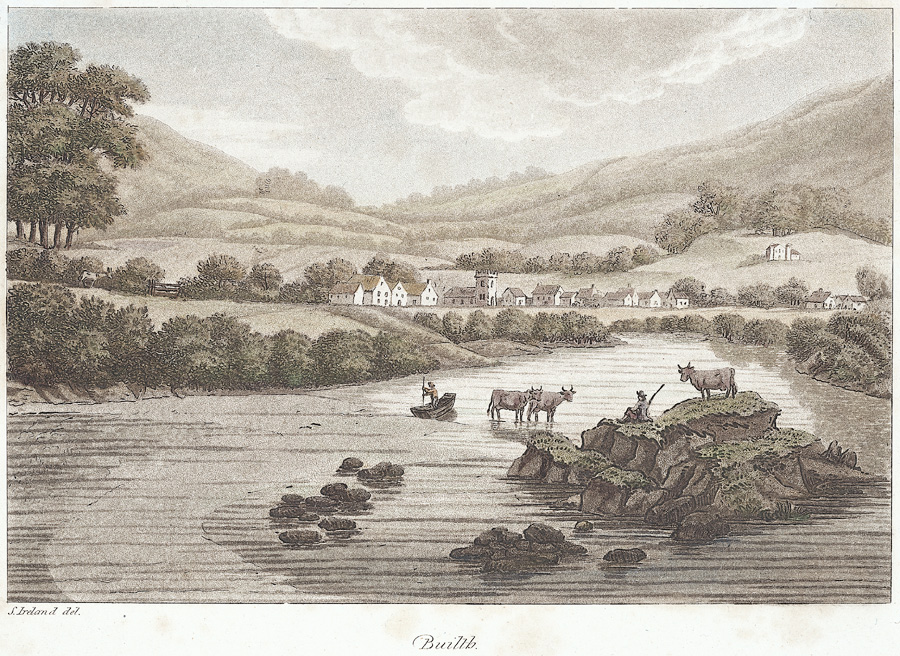
Buellt, 1797

Buellt or Builth was a cantref in medieval Wales, located west of the River Wye. Unlike most cantrefs, it was not part of any of the major Welsh kingdoms for most of its history, but was instead ruled by an autonomous local dynasty. During the Norman era it was associated with Rhwng Gwy a Hafren, a region independent of the Welsh monarchies and controlled by Norman Marcher Lords. In the 16th century, it was reorganized as a hundred and joined with the former kingdom of Brycheiniog to form the county of Brecknockshire.

== Description ==
The name Buellt, also rendered Buallt, comes from the Welsh words bu, meaning "ox", and gellt (later gwellt), meaning pasture. This was later anglicized to Builth, as in the modern town of Builth Wells.

Situated in the valley of Afon Irfon, Buellt's boundaries were roughly the Cambrian Mountains to the north, the River Wye to the east, the Mynydd Epynt range to the south, and Ceredigion to the west. It was closely associated with the territories of Gwrtheyrnion, Elfael, and Maelienydd, and as such was often considered part of the region known as Rhwng Gwy a Hafren (English: Between Wye and Severn) despite being west of the Wye. The cantref was divided into four major commotes, whose boundaries are unclear: Treflys, Pebuellt, Dinan, and Is Irfon. Most of Buellt's major sites were located along the Irfon, including the courts of the commotes and the major church at Llanafan Fawr, dedicated to Saint Afan Buellt, the cantref's chief saint.

== Early history ==
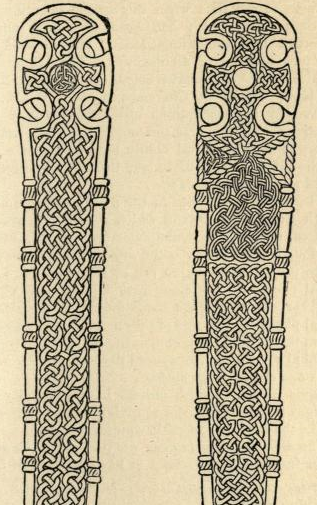
The 9th- or 10th-century Llanynis pillar cross from Neuadd Siarman near Builth.

It is unknown when Buellt began to emerge as a distinct political unit. Its organization as a cantref seems to have developed along the earlier tribal boundaries of a gwlad ("people") or tud ("tribe"). During the Early Middle Ages, Buellt and Gwrtheyrnion on the other side of the Wye formed a small regional kingdom. This kingdom's rulers traced their descent back to the legendary 5th-century warlord Vortigern (Welsh: Gwrtheyrn, from which Gwrtheyrnion was named.)

The kingdom is known from the 9th-century Historia Brittonum, whose author, possibly a native of southeastern Wales, focused particular attention on it. The Historia recounts that after Vortigern had invited the Anglo-Saxons to Britain and then been forced west, his son Pascent ruled Buellt and Gwrtheyrnion as a grant from Ambrosius Aurelianus. Whatever the reality of this story, another section attributes descent from Pascent and Vortigern to Ffernfael ap Tewdwr, a 9th-century ruler of Buellt and Gwrtheyrnion known from other sources.

The Historia further includes Buellt in its mirabilia section, or list of marvels. According to the text, Buellt is the location of the "Carn Cabal", a (since lost) petrosomatoglyph: the imprint of a dog's paw. This marvel is attributed to King Arthur's dog Cavall, who supposedly left the print while chasing the boar Troyt. Afterward, Arthur placed this stone on top of a cairn, and anyone who tried to move it would find it back in its place the next day. The placename survives as Carn Gafallt near Rhayader, though it is unlikely the modern hill is the same one mentioned in the Historia. The prose tale Culhwch and Olwen contains a more elaborate version of Arthur's hunting of the divine boar, here known as Twrch Trwyth, however, in Culhwch the boar's detailed itinerary does not take him through Buellt.

By the 11th century, Buellt and the rest of the Rhwng Gwy a Hafren passed under the control of a different dynasty tracing its descent to Elystan Glodrydd.

== Norman era ==
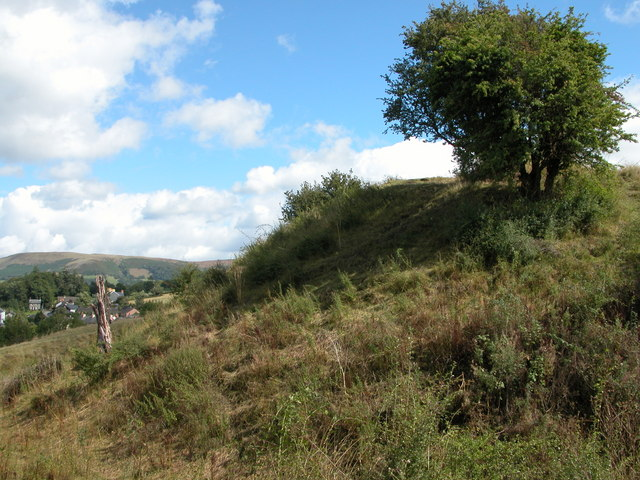
The site of the former Braose motte and bailey and the subsequent stone Builth Castle on the east end of modern Builth Wells

During the High Middle Ages, several rulers from the surrounding kingdoms took control of Buellt, but it generally reverted to independence upon their death. During the Norman invasion of Wales, the Marcher Lord Philip de Braose conquered Buellt shortly after he took Rhwng Gwy a Hafren in 1095. Philip fortified the hill east of present-day Builth Wells with a wooden motte and bailey castle and held the area until his death in 1134, when it passed to his son William. Through this period, however, the representatives of the old Welsh dynasty descended from Elystan contested the Marcher Lords' rule. The area changed hands between multiple Norman and Welsh figures, including Roger Mortimer, Rhys ap Gruffudd and Llywelyn the Great. Buellt passed to Llywelyn's grandson Llywelyn ap Gruffudd, whose rights to it (though not other parts of Rhwng Gwy a Hafren) were confirmed by King Henry III in the 1267 Treaty of Montgomery. In November 1282, Edward I overran Buellt as part of his final conquest of Wales.

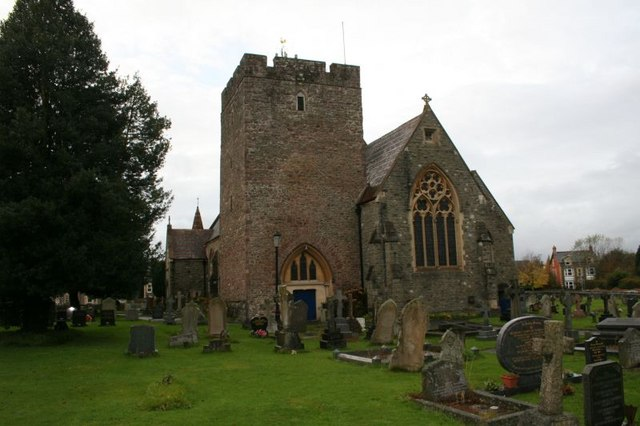
St Mary's in Builth Wells, retaining its 14th-century tower

Edward ordered the construction of the stone Builth Castle on the site of Braose's burnt fort, although construction was halted for lack of funds. The castle saw action during Madog ap Llywelyn and Owain Glyndŵr's rebellions, but was subsequently abandoned. In the 17th century it was damaged by a fire and its stones were plundered; it has since almost entirely disappeared.

In the 16th century, as part of Henry VIII's Laws in Wales Acts, Buellt became a hundred and merged with Brycheiniog into the new county of Brecknockshire. In 1996 the area became part of the modern county of Powys. The cantref's name survives in the modern town of Builth Wells and the site of nearby Builth Castle.
