= Catan (disambiguation) =

Catan or Settlers of Catan is a board game.

Catan may also refer to:

== Spin-offs of the board game ==
- The Settlers of Catan (novel), a 2003 novel by Rebecca Gable based on the board game
- Catan (2007 video game), a 2007 Xbox Live Arcade video game adapted from the board game
- Catan (2008 video game), a 2008 PlayStation 3 video game adapted from the board game

== People with the name ==
- Saint Catan or Saint Cathan, Irish monk revered as a saint in parts of Scotland
- Daniel Catán (1949–2011), Mexican composer
- Victor Catan (born 1949), Moldovan politician
- Pete Catan (born 1957), American football player
- Radu Catan (born 1989), Moldovan footballer

== See also ==
- Katan (disambiguation)
