= The Settlers of Catan (novel) =

2003 novel by Rebecca Gable

The Settlers of Catan (Die Siedler von Catan)
- Author: Rebecca Gable
- Language: German, English
- Genre: Historical Fiction
- Publisher: Bastei Lübbe, AmazonCrossing
- Publication date: 2003
- English publication date: 2011
- Pages: 620
- ISBN: 978-1611090819

The Settlers of Catan by Rebecca Gable is a historical fiction novel based on Klaus Teuber’s popular board game Catan. The novel was first released in Germany in 2003 and was translated to English in 2011.

The novel takes place in 850 AD and follows the story of a seafaring Norse community who set out from their village of Elasund to discover the mythical island of Catan.

== Background ==
Klaus Teuber first released The Settlers of Catan board game in Germany in 1995, and three years later the concept of a Catan novel took seat in his mind. In 2000, he read a book by award-winning German historical novelist, Rebecca Gable, called The Smile of Fortune which takes place during the Hundred Years War in England. Partway through reading the novel, he was convinced that Rebecca Gable must be the one to write the saga behind The Settlers of Catan.

Teuber met Gable at the Frankfurt Book Fair in 2000 and proposed his idea to her. Gable accepted, and the two collaborated in developing an outline for the story.

The novel was published in Germany in 2003. It was translated to English and released in America in 2011.

== Plot ==
The story is broken into four parts: Elasund, The Voyage, Catan, and Hagalaz.

=== Part I: Elasund ===
The year is 850 A.D.. Candamir and Osmund are two close friends who live in the coastal Norse fishing village of Elasund with their respective families. The village is attacked by Turons - people of a neighboring region - who burn as many men and boys as they can, while taking many of the women as slaves. Among the dead is Osmund's wife, Gisla.

The people of Elasund grow anxious as their poor harvests and meager fishing catches are barely enough to last them through the harsh winter. On the brink of starvation, the villagers - especially Candamir, Osmund, and Osmund's uncle Olaf - entertain thoughts of setting sail for new shores.

Olaf, an experienced merchant and the wealthiest man in Elasund, shares information of an unnamed island that he accidentally discovered years ago. Olaf had been caught in a twelve-day storm before landing upon this island somewhere southwest of the “Land of the Franks”. The island's temperate climate boasted short winters and fertile crops.

When spring finally arrives, the three men attempt to rally enough support for the voyage. However, it is not until the village witch Brigitta gives an oracle that most of the Elasunders are convinced to leave their homeland and embark on the risk of a voyage.

=== Part II: The Voyage ===
The emigrants’ first stop is in the Cold Islands where they pause their voyage to trade. They strike a deal with the local king to give him wool in exchange for dried meats, fresh water, and mead. However, at the feast that night, the king secretly poisons the guests’ mead with the intention of raiding their ships early the next morning.

The king's beautiful wife Siglind, who has suffered abuse at her husband's hands, sneaks aboard Candamir's ship and warns him of the plot. Her only request is that she be taken with them. Under the leadership of Candamir, one of the few remaining sober leaders, the Elasunders immediately set out and successfully flee their pursuers.

Candamir has a slave named Austin who is a young Benedictine monk from the land of the Saxons. As they sail past the coast of Wales, Austin considers jumping overboard to escape servitude and return to his family. However, his desire to convert the Elasunders to Christianity keeps him from the attempt.

The Elasunders continue to sail southwest, hoping to hit the mysterious storm described by Olaf. They eventually do, but the storm only lasts for eight days, leaving the fleet of ships in an unknown expanse of water with no wind. With the water supply quickly dwindling, many of the voyagers and livestock on board become ill.

Brigitta sends out her three black ravens, one each to the southwest, northwest, and northeast, with the hopes that one will not return and thus indicate the direction of land. When all three return, many of the voyagers blame Olaf for their misfortune and threaten to take his life.

Before a civil war can break out among the crew, a second storm approaches, this one fiercer than the first. After several days, it shipwrecks them upon an unknown shore. Candamir's ship was destroyed, but they discover that most of the ships have made it intact.

=== Part III: Catan ===
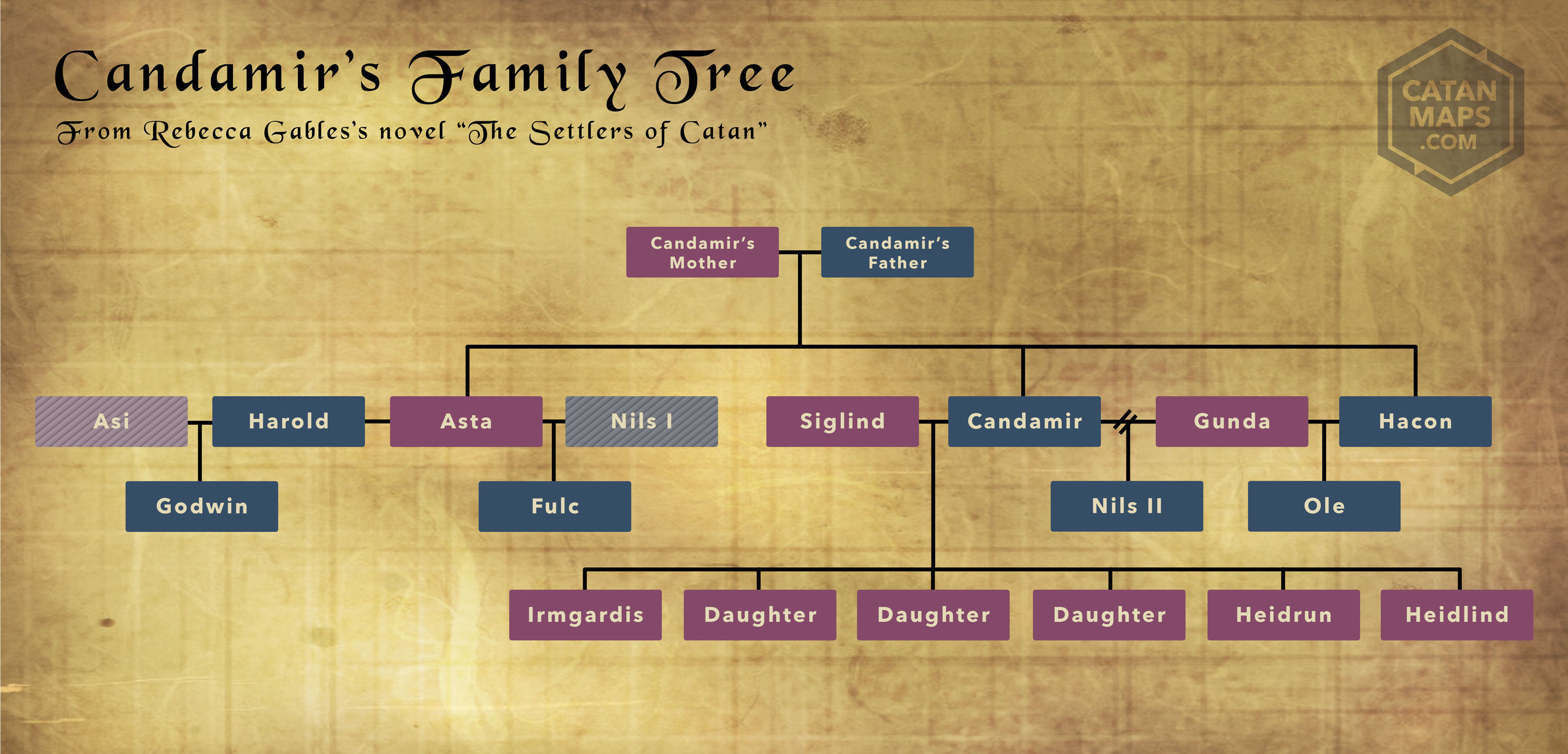
Candamir's family tree

The new shores boast temperate forests, sandy shores surrounded by rocky caves, and most importantly of all a freshwater stream. It appears to be uninhabited.

The Elasunders encounter a large flock of white ravens, which they ecstatically interpret as a good omen from the god Odin. The white ravens evoke their well-known Legend of Catan, leading them to believe that Catan is the shore they now walk upon.

Shortly after landing, Candamir's slave-girl Gunda bears him his first-born child, Nils, whom he names after his sister Asta's deceased husband. Several of the voyagers travel inland to explore the terrain. From a lookout they discover that Catan also boasts rocky mountains, verdant pastures, a great river, a desert wasteland, and a vulcani or “fiery mountain.”

After discovering that they can successfully bring ships from the coast up the river, the settlers decide to build their new village at a place where the forest, river, and fields meet.

The blacksmith Harald and his wife Asi explore the mountains in the east, but Asi accidentally dies falling from a cliff. The mountain is named in her honor. Harold eventually remarries to Candamir's sister, Asta.

With most of his supplies destroyed in the shipwreck, Candamir scrambles to procure enough seed for the coming harvest. He and his household begrudgingly enter into temporary service of Olaf to build him a new house, and in exchange Olaf promises to give him seed.

One night, Candamir's 14-year-old brother Hacon is on shepherd duty when Gunda comes to him and invites him to have sex. He loses his virginity that night, and upon waking discovers that several of Olaf's sheep have been eaten by wolves.

Olaf brings Hacon before the village for punishment - a dozen lashes for each of the five lost animals. Hacon is halfway through the lashings and dangerously close to death when Candamir steps in, offering to take the remaining lashings in his brother's stead.

The monk Austin gradually nurses Hacon back to health. Despite having saved his life, Candamir is still very bitter toward Hacon for sleeping with Gunda. Because of this, Hacon goes to live and apprentice with Harold the blacksmith, and in exchange Harold's bitter son Godwin goes to apprentice as a carpenter with Candamir.

Osmund and Candamir both are attracted to Siglind, but she has devoted herself to the Christian God. Osmund proposes marriage to her, but she refuses, saying she has sworn off all men.

Osmund instead marries Inga, a 13-year-old girl. Brigitta, Osmund's grandmother-in-law from his first marriage, deems them anointed and secretly prophesies to them that their firstborn will be king of Catan. Furthermore, Inga is to one day take Brigitta's place as the priestess of their religion, while Osmund will be ruler of the island.

The people of Catan progress in building their village and constructing a temple to Odin. Attempting to take advantage of the change from Elasund, Candamir makes repeated efforts at the Thing (community meeting) to update their traditions and laws to be more civilized - in particular abolishing the law of blood feud. Austin continues to convert more of the settlers to Christianity, including Asta and Hacon. Candamir is not converted, but grows more tolerant of the Christian beliefs. He is not particularly devout in the Norse religion either. Despite their different beliefs, Candamir and Siglind fall in love and begin a secret relationship.

One day, upon returning from gathering honey, Candamir, Osmund, Siglind, and Jared stumble upon a shocking scene in the woods: Olaf is raping his male slave the Turon. In order to prevent them from telling anyone, Olaf tries to kill them but is unsuccessful. They bring Olaf before the people of Catan who determine that he is to die by “snakebite” - a process by which a snake is inserted into a reed which is placed down the victim's throat; the snake enters the man's belly and eats him from the inside.

The night before Olaf's execution, his son Jared visits him at the tree where he is bound and guarded. Jared is attacked by his brother Lars, who frees their father. Olaf, most of his children, and a number of slaves flee into the wasteland. Lars ties Jared to the tree in place of Olaf, where the townspeople discover him the next morning. They send out a band of warriors to hunt the party, but they are unsuccessful. In the meantime, the Turon slave is overwhelmed by shame and commits suicide.

Time passes, and Candamir and Siglind are married. Osmund is not jealous, for he thinks Siglind's belief in the “Carpenter God” is foolish and dangerous.

One night, Olaf and his party of bandits return to the settlement to steal crops, livestock, and slaves. While Candamir and Siglind are sleeping, Olaf sneaks into their bedroom and tries to rape Candamir and kidnap Siglind. However, before Olaf has his way, Austin fights him off. In gratitude, Candamir offers Austin his freedom.

=== Part IV: Hagalaz ===
Six years have passed. Candamir and Siglind have added four daughters to their family, with female twins on the way. Candamir's son Nils and Osmund's son Roric are seven years old and good friends. As a free man, Austin now has his own small hut in which he spends his time writing an account of the Catanian settlers and growing herbs for healing.

The Catanians continue to cultivate the land around them, discovering a clay pit south of the wasteland, and building an outpost in the mountains for mining ore. Olaf and his band of robbers continue to occasionally raid the settlement, with varying success. The settlers are puzzled as to how he is surviving in the barren wasteland to the south.

Brigitta dies, leaving Inga as her successor. Under her rule, the people of Catan experience a resurgence in old rituals such as drunken festivities in the temple centered on animal sacrifice.

During a terrible storm, Olaf returns and attempts to kidnap Hacon for his skill as a smith. Candamir attempts to fight him off, and during their brawl, a bolt of lightning strikes a tree which falls on Olaf and kills him. However, Olaf's son Lars leads the rest of the robbers in kidnapping both Hacon and Candamir.

Lars leads the two captives to their hidden underground settlement in the wasteland, and Candamir nearly dies on the forced march. Hacon and Candamir discover that the rebel community has been able to survive in the desert because of an underground spring. Over the following weeks, Osmund leads several search parties through the wasteland to rescue them, but is unsuccessful.

A volcanic eruption combined with an earthquake allows Candamir and Hacon to escape through the roof of their prison cave. During the strenuous march back through the wasteland, Candamir collapses and Hacon carries him the rest of the way to the forest. While they are travelling back to the settlement, Lars and his men make another raid on the village.

Gunnar, Lars’ brother, defects from the band of thieves and attempts to rejoin the peaceful settlers. However, Osmund believes that it is a scheme and tortures Gunnar by burning his feet. Austin steps in to put an end to the torture, so Osmund attacks the monk and wounds him.

Upon returning to the village, Candamir and Hacon discover that there has been growing tension between the Christians and those of the Norse religion, a roughly even split in the community. A strong rift grows between Candamir, whose own wife is Christian, and Osmund, whose wife is the temple priestess. Osmund believes that Austin is a curse on their community and needs to be put to death; Candamir strongly disagrees since Austin is now his friend. Osmund disallows his children to associate with Candamir's children.

Upon returning from a fishing trip, Candamir discovers that the “Hagalaz” rune has been painted on his home. The “H” symbol stands for both the destruction of hail, as well as loss, pain, and discord. Candamir later discovers that Osmund has painted it there.

One night, the volcano again breaks out in a violent eruption. Osmund and Inga's followers believe it to be a sign of Odin's displeasure for the unbelievers among them. Shortly after Austin says Mass, they kidnap him and bring him to the island temple. They plan to burn him alive on their altar as an offering to appease the gods.

Just before Inga is able to murder Austin, a ball of fire crashes through the roof of the temple, lands in the sacred spring, and continues to burn. The people panic, and the sacrifice is disrupted. It is discovered that Siglind had climbed the roof and thrown the missile through the ceiling. Candamir and Hacon send off Austin to flee into the woods to a particular meeting point on the coast. The entire temple burns down.

The following day, a Thing is called to determine Candamir's punishment for orchestrating the burning of the temple. Osmund lobbies for a holmgang with Candamir, a duel to the death. Candamir refuses, and instead places himself in exile. He is voluntarily joined by Siglind, Hacon and Gunda, Harald and Asta, Jared, Gunnar, and about half of the settlers.

They depart in two days time, and after picking up Austin at the meeting point, sail around the island to the south coast of Catan. In accordance with Norse custom, Candamir drops a bundle of posts from his high seat overboard, and they follow the drifting posts to see where the currents cast them upon land.

The settlers head ashore and discover this new region of Catan. Candamir decides he will build a great house atop the cliff overlooking the sea.

== The Legend of Catan ==
Within the novel, the "Legend of Catan" plays a central role to the culture of the Elasunders. This legend was created for the novel by Rebecca Gable, but she attempted to follow the storytelling structure of actual Norse mythology.

As the legend goes, when the world was still young and before the gods did battle with the giants, Odin was walking through the land of the fairies one night. He caught sight of the daughter of the fairy king standing beside a brook, and was stricken with longing for her. Her name was Tanuri which means “Daughter of the Starlight.”

Eventually Odin approached her and made advances to her. She turned him down for she was already betrothed to another. Odin said if she broke her promise, he would fulfill her every desire. She thought it over for three days, and upon returning to the brook told Odin that she would accept his hand if he gave her a land that was perfect.

Odin asked the giants for their help in constructing a perfect land - an island in the sea with no winter or drought, no sorrow or pain, with mountains rich in minerals, valleys full of fertile soil, and groves of trees, beautiful flowers, and sweet fruit. Odin rejoiced in this perfect land and brought Tanuri there.

After inspecting the land, Tanuri complained that there was no snow, which is white and pure. So Odin summoned a large flock of white ravens and they settled at Tanuri's feet like a covering of snow.

Then she complained that there was no fire, in its purity and perfection. And so Odin thrust his spear deep into one of the mountains, causing it to spew fire.

Odin asked Tanuri if she was now satisfied, but she scoffed at him. The land still had no sorrow or pain, so how could it be perfect? Perfection, she said, lies in the balance of all things, good and evil.

Tanuri left Odin, who remained on the island and was overcome with grief. Thus the land became perfect, but too late. In Tanuri's honor, Odin named the island Catan, which in the language of the fairies means “Land of Starlight.” Odin then moved the island far out into the sea so that no mortal might ever reach its shores.

== Historical accuracy ==
While the island of Catan and the people of Elasund are entirely fictional, many of the Norse rites and customs described in the novel are historical fact. These include using ravens to search for land, collective urination after the Thing, painting the temple walls with sacrificial blood, and throwing posts of the high seat overboard to see where they drift. In addition, the description of ships, houses, weapons, clothing, and articles of daily life are accurate to the time period.

== References to the board game ==
Many subtle references to the board game are found throughout the novel, mostly in the way the settlers trade with one another. Osmund is known for having the best flock of sheep, Candamir is known for his lumberjack and carpentry skills, and Harald and Hacon are known for their work as ore smiths.

The most obvious reference is that of the Robber, which in the novel is represented by Olaf and his band of thieves who routinely raid the settlers’ village.

The novel also gives a shoutout to the board game's volcano variant, with the fiery mountain playing a significant role in the storyline.

== Critical reception ==
Preston Derosiers of CatanMaps.com called the book a satisfying read, saying it "manages to weave in imagery from the game in a way that is restrained enough to retain its independence as a rich and entertaining piece of historical fiction, while still undoubtedly earning its title." Lee Chadeayne of the Historical Novel Society said, "Gable’s main strength is her ability to write in a way that creates conflict in the novel and at the same time brings out the goodness and unity among all the characters, thus making the story more realistic and in sync with a time period where people were rigid about laws for kindness and goodness laid down by their gods."

== Tie-in products ==
The Settlers of Catan novelization sparked its own set of spinoff board games known as the Catan Adventures series, which carry a similar theme to the original game but very different mechanics. Candamir: The First Settlers was published in 2004 and Elasund: The First City was published in 2005.

== Movie or television adaptation ==
In February 2015, Variety announced that producer Gail Katz had purchased the film rights to “The Settlers of Catan”. Katz said, “The island of Catan is a vivid, visual, exciting and timeless world with classic themes and moral challenges that resonate today. There is a tremendous opportunity to take what people love about the game and its mythology as a starting point for the narrative.”

It is not currently known if a future movie or television adaptation would use Rebecca Gable's novel as source material.
