= Alice Perrers =

English royal mistress

Alice de Salisbury
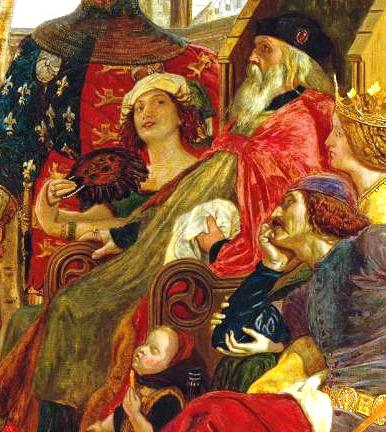
- Painting by Ford Madox Brown
- Born: Alice Salisbury circa 1348; Hertfordshire, England
- Died: 1400/1401; Gaynes Park, Upminster, England
- Resting place: Church of St Laurence, Upminster, England
- Other names: Alice de Windsor; Alice Perrers
- Known for: Mistress of Edward III of England
- Spouse(s): Janyn Perrers (m. 1360; his death in 1364); Sir William de Windsor (m. 1375; his death in 1389)
- Partner: King Edward III of England
- Children: 3, including Sir John de Southeray

Alice de Salisbury, also known as Alice de Windsor (circa 1348 –1400/1401) was a mistress of King Edward III of England. As a result of his patronage, she became the wealthiest and most influential woman in the country. She was widely despised and accused of taking advantage of the king in his old age.

== Biography ==
=== Early life ===
Alice was born around 1348. No birth record remains, but it seems that Perrers was the surname of her first husband. Her ancestry has been the topic of much speculation, which is detailed below. Around 1360, at the age of 12, she married Janyn Perrers, a jeweler who died around 1364.

=== Life at the royal court ===
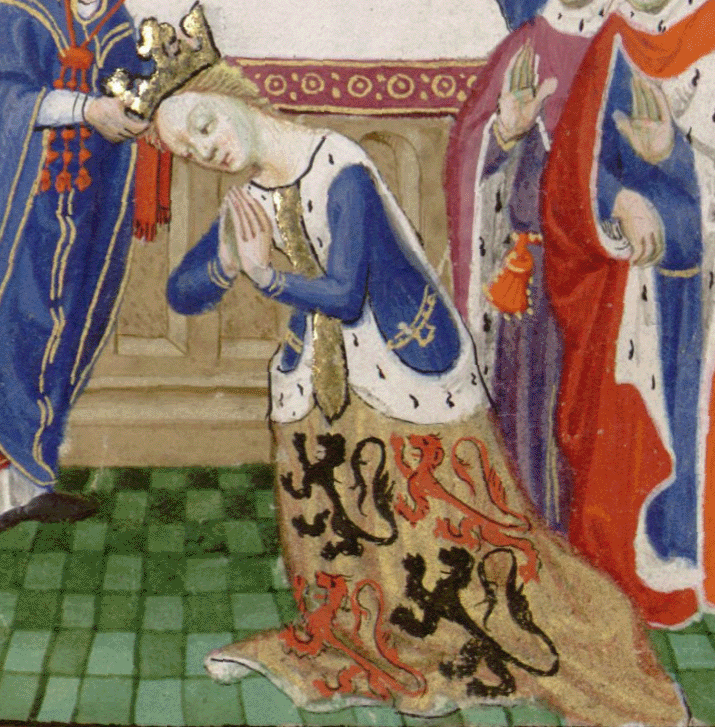
Queen Philippa, employer of Alice Perrers at her coronation in 1330

Perrers became a part of the household of Queen Philippa (1310/1315–1369) as a domicella ("damsel") before 1359. She became the mistress of the king, Edward III (1312–1377) around 1366, when she was around 18 years old and the King around 55. During the Queen's life, they had three children together. Three years after their relationship started, the Queen died, which devastated the King, causing him to lean more on Perrers. This resulted in her receiving more, mostly negative, attention from the court.

Perrers exploited Edward's growing senility and convinced him to buy her the same jewels over and over again, which she would then turn in for more cash. She amassed a fortune of more than £20,000, by doing so, which would be worth around £6,000,000 as of 2016.

In 1367, Anthony de Lucy, 3rd Baron Lucy, and fellow knight John de Moulton borrowed money from Alice Perrers to fund their participation in a Northern Crusade against pagan Lithuanians under the Teutonic Knights.

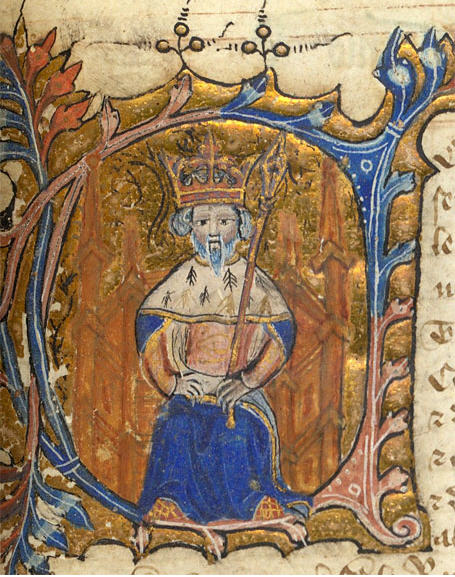
King Edward III, Alice Perrers' lover and patron

Perrer's power further grew between 1370 and 1376. She reportedly provoked fear, and no one dared to sue her. She was seen as an ambitious, calculating, cold-hearted opportunist who manipulated the elderly King. Towards the end of Edward III's life, Perrers was even accused of making his life miserable, and it is reported that she even stole the rings off his fingers after the King died.

As the King's health was ailing, Perrers contracted a secret marriage in November 1375, at the age of 27, with 53-year-old Sir William de Windsor, Baron Windsor (circa 1325–1384) to ensure her safety and livelihood after Edward's death. He was the King's lieutenant in Ireland. De Windsor spent long periods of time away from England, thus making it less probable that the King would discover the marriage. The couple remained together until the death of the husband on 15 September 1384, but had no children.

=== Associations with witchcraft ===
In 1376, a Dominican friar accused of practising love magic on Perrers' behalf was arrested and tried by an ecclesiastical court. He was alleged to have used incantations, herbal preparations and wax effigies of Perrers and Edward III to influence the king's affections. Historians have suggested that these accusations of sorcery were politically motivated.

=== Exile ===
In 1376, an ordinance aimed specifically at Perrers set penalties for women who practised "maintenance", interfering in the due process of the law. A contemporary description of the ordinance is as follows:

Because a complaint was made to the king that some women have pursued various business and disputes in the king's courts by way of maintenance, bribing and influencing the parties, which thing displeases the king; the king forbids any woman to do it, and especially Alice Perrers, on penalty of whatever the said Perrers can forfeit and of being banished from the realm.

Perrers was tried for corruption and subsequently exiled from England by the Good Parliament, her lands forfeit. In May 1379, the royal treasurer Thomas Brantingham delivered 21,868 pearls confiscated from Alice Perrers to the royal wardrobe. She was later able to return and regain some of her lands, but she would spend the rest of her life trying to get everything back.

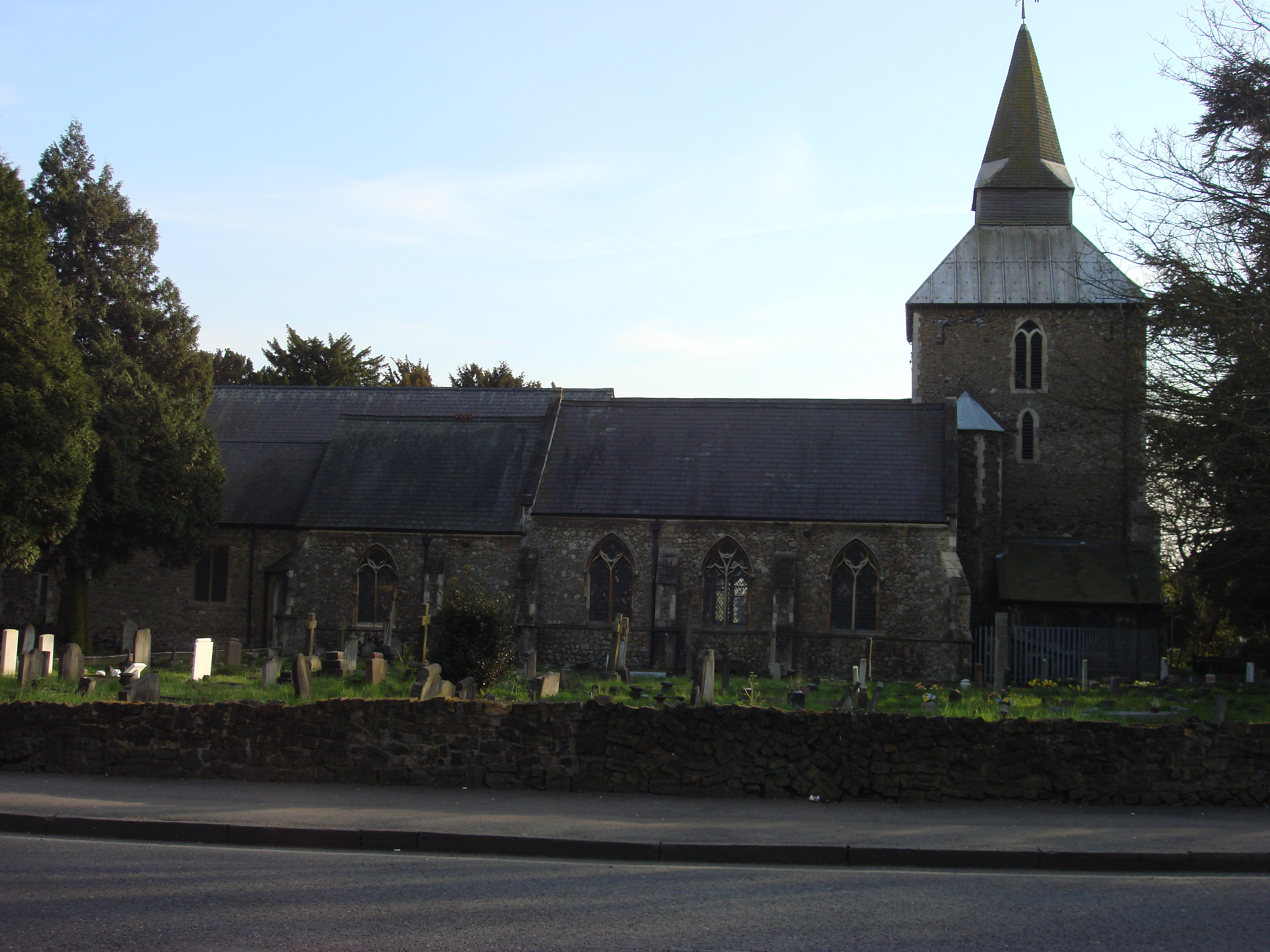
Church of St Laurence in Upminster, where Alice Perrers was buried

=== Death ===
Perrers died during the winter of 1400/1401, aged around 52, and was buried in the Church of St Laurence in Upminster.

== Lands ==
At the height of her power, Perrers possessed 56 manors, castles and town houses in over 25 counties of England, only 15 of which were gifts from the king. These properties included Playford Hall in Suffolk, and the manor of Gaynes in Upminster, Essex. When property disputes arose with the abbot of St. Albans in 1374, Perrers, with the King's authority behind her, sat in the court to intimidate the judges and ensured that the abbot abandoned his claim.

== Influence on literature ==
Perrers is thought to have served as the prototype for Geoffrey Chaucer's Wife of Bath in The Canterbury Tales. She was also a major patron of Chaucer. Her influence on literature may also have extended to William Langland's Lady Mede in Piers Plowman. Langland describes Lady Meed wearing rings of purest "perreize", a word for precious stones possibly chosen to play on the surname Perrers.

== Ancestry ==
As no birth record of Alice Perrers remains, many unfounded theories have arisen about her parentage. The earliest tradition spoke of a lowly birth, either as a niece of William of Wykeham (1320/1324–1404), Bishop of Winchester and Lord Chancellor, or as the daughter of a weaver from Devon. According to contemporary chronicler Thomas Walsingham, she was "from the town of Henny" and "of low birth" as the daughter of a thatcher. Walsingham's account is often questioned because of his open hostility against the royal court and especially Perrers. Other evidence suggests that her birth surname was Salisbury and that she had at least one brother, John.

Later traditions established a higher birth for her: it has been suggested that she was the daughter of John Perrers of Holt and wife of Sir Thomas of Narford, or the illegitimate daughter of an Earl of Warenne (most likely Richard Fitzalan, 1346–1397) by a member of the Narford family. Haldeen Braddy has argued that she was the second wife of William Chaumpaigne of London and stepmother of Cecilia Chaumpaigne, the woman in whose kidnapping or rape Geoffrey Chaucer might have played a role, but this has already been disproven by Martha Powell Harley. According to the Encyclopædia Britannica, she probably belonged to the Hertfordshire family of Perrers. This would likely make her the daughter of Sir Richard Perrers.

At that same time there was a woman in England called Alice Perrers. She was a shameless, impudent harlot, and of low birth, for she was the daughter of a thatcher from the town of Henny, elevated by fortune. She was not attractive or beautiful, but knew how to compensate for these defects with the seductiveness of her voice. Blind fortune elevated this woman to such heights and promoted her to a greater intimacy with the king than was proper, since she had been the maidservant and mistress of a man of Lombardy. And while the queen was still alive, the king loved this woman more than he loved the queen.

— Thomas Walsingham, The St Albans Chronicle

== Issue ==
Perrers had three illegitimate children with King Edward III during the lifetime of Queen Philippa, thus between 1366 (when their relationship started) and 1369 (the queen's death):

- Sir John de Southeray (circa 1364 – 1383), who married Maud Percy, daughter of Henry Percy, 3rd Baron Percy, and had no issue;
- Jane, (born circa 1365), who married Richard Northland;
- Joan (circa 1366 – before January 1431), who married Robert Skerne, a lawyer and member of parliament.

From her marriage to William de Windsor, she had no children.

== In fiction ==
Candace Robb features Alice Perrers in her Medieval Mysteries series and Perrers is the main protagonist in Robb's The King's Mistress written as Emma Campion. She appears in Anya Seton's 1954 novel Katherine. Alice Perrers is the main character in Vanora Bennett's 2010 novel The People's Queen. She is a character in Jean Plaidy's Vow on the Heron. She is portrayed in Rebecca Gablé's Das Lächeln der Fortuna, a historical novel in the German language about the time-period. She is the protagonist of the 2012 novel The King's Concubine by Anne O'Brien. She also appears in The Traitor's Noose, the fourth novel in the Lions and Lilies series by Catherine A. Wilson and Catherine T. Wilson.
