= John de Southeray =

Illegitimate son of King Edward III of England

John de Southeray (1364–1383) was an illegitimate son of King Edward III of England by his mistress Alice Perrers. He was the oldest of Perrers' three acknowledged illegitimate children by her royal lover. He was knighted in April 1377, alongside the future King Richard II. That same year, he was married to Maud Percy, a daughter of Henry de Percy, 3rd Baron Percy; she divorced him in 1380, claiming she had not consented to the marriage.

During the abortive Castilian campaign led by his half-brother the Earl of Cambridge in 1381, John led a contingent of English soldiers. After his troops went unpaid, John led them in a mutiny; he may have been only a figurehead for the mutineers, though, as he (unlike the other conspirators) went unpunished afterwards.
