= Edward III =

King of England from 1327 to 1377

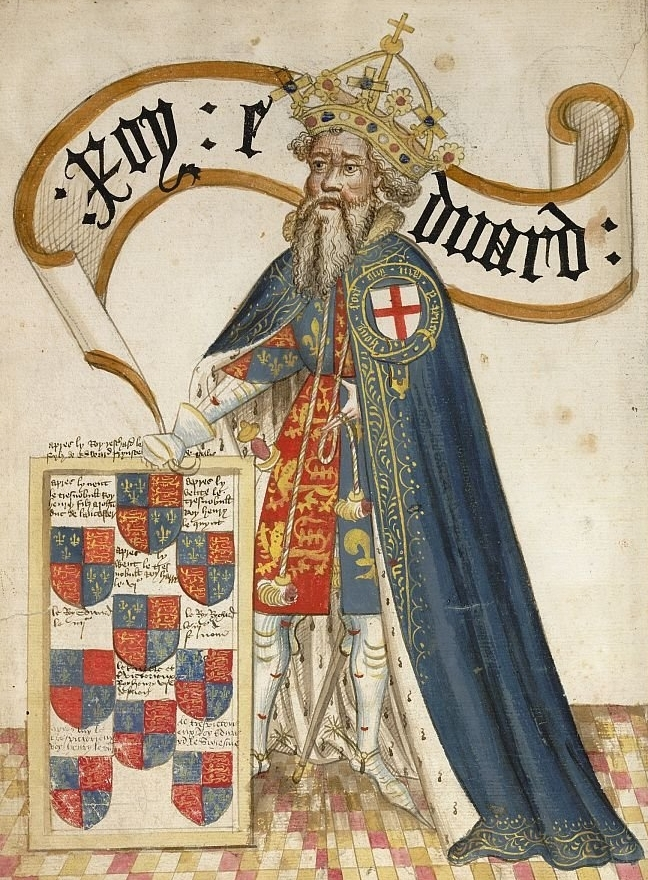
- Posthumous drawing as head of the Order of the Garter, c. 1430–1440 in the Bruges Garter Book

King of England
- Reign: 25 January 1327 – 21 June 1377
- Coronation: 1 February 1327
- Predecessor: Edward II
- Successor: Richard II
- Regents: Isabella of France and Roger Mortimer (1327–1330)
- Born: 13 November 1312; Windsor Castle, Berkshire, England
- Died: 21 June 1377 (aged 64); Sheen Palace, Richmond, England
- Burial: 5 July 1377; Westminster Abbey, London
- Spouse: Philippa of Hainault (m. 1328; died 1369)
- Issue more...: Edward the Black Prince; Isabella, Countess of Bedford; Joan of England; Lionel, Duke of Clarence; John of Gaunt, Duke of Lancaster; Edmund, Duke of York; Mary, Duchess of Brittany; Margaret, Countess of Pembroke; Thomas, Duke of Gloucester; John de Southeray (ill.)
- House: Plantagenet
- Father: Edward II of England
- Mother: Isabella of France

Edward III (13 November 1312 – 21 June 1377), also known as Edward of Windsor before accession, was King of England from January 1327 until his death in 1377. He is noted for his military success and for restoring royal authority after the disastrous and unorthodox reign of his father, Edward II. Edward III transformed the Kingdom of England into one of the most formidable military powers in Europe. His fifty-year reign is one of the longest in English history and saw vital developments in legislation and government, in particular the evolution of the English Parliament, as well as the ravages of the Black Death. He outlived his eldest son, Edward the Black Prince, and was succeeded by his grandson, Richard II.

Edward was crowned at age fourteen after his father was deposed by his mother, Isabella of France, and her lover, Roger Mortimer. At seventeen, he led a coup d'état against Mortimer, the de facto ruler of England, and in 1330 began his personal reign. After a successful campaign in Scotland, he declared himself rightful heir to the French throne, (Note: Edward first styled himself "King of France" in 1337, though he did not assume the title until 1340.) starting the Hundred Years' War (1337–1453). After some initial setbacks, the first phase of the war went strongly in England's favour, and it became known as the Edwardian War. Victories at Crécy and Poitiers led to the Treaty of Brétigny (1360), under which England made territorial gains in France, and Edward renounced his claim to the French throne. Edward's later years were marked by foreign policy failure and domestic strife, largely as a result of his declining activity and poor health. The second phase of the Hundred Years' War began in 1369, and by 1375 England had lost most of Edward's conquests, except for the Pale of Calais. (Note: Treaty of Bruges (1375))

Edward was temperamental and believed himself able to heal by the royal touch, as some prior English kings did. He was also capable of unusual clemency. He was in many ways a conventional medieval king whose main interest was warfare, but he also had a broad range of non-military interests. Admired in his own time, and for centuries after, he was later denounced as an irresponsible adventurer by Whig historians, but modern historians credit him with significant achievements.

== Background ==
Edward's father, King Edward II of England had court favourites who were unpopular with his nobility, such as Piers Gaveston and Hugh Despenser the Younger. Gaveston was killed during a noble rebellion against Edward II in 1312, while Despenser was hated by the English nobility. Edward II was also unpopular with the common people due to his repeated demands that they provide unpaid military service in Scotland. None of his campaigns there were successful, and this led to a further decline in his popularity, particularly with the nobility. His image was damaged again in 1322 when he executed his cousin Thomas, Earl of Lancaster, and confiscated the Lancaster estates. Historian Chris Given-Wilson wrote that, by 1325, the nobility believed that "no landholder could feel safe" under the regime. This distrust of Edward II was shared by his wife, Isabella of France, (Note: This had not always been the case. For most of her marriage, she had been a loyal wife who had provided the King with four children. Moreover, she was politically active in Edward's cause, having shared his hatred of the Earl of Lancaster, and played a pivotal role in Anglo-French relations. This is at variance with the impression received from chroniclers writing under Isabella and Mortimer between 1327 and 1330, who says Lisa St John, tend to give "the impression that Isabella's relationship with Edward was dysfunctional from the start".) who believed Despenser responsible for poisoning the King's mind against her. In September 1324 Queen Isabella was publicly humiliated when the government declared her an enemy alien, and the King repossessed her estates, probably at the urging of Despenser. Edward II also disbanded her retinue. Edward II had already been threatened with deposition on two previous occasions (in 1310 and 1321). Historians agree that hostility towards the king was universal. W. H. Dunham and C. T. Wood ascribed this to Edward II's "cruelty and personal faults", suggesting that "very few, not even his half-brothers or his son, seemed to care about the wretched man" and that none would fight for him. A contemporary chronicler described Edward II as rex inutilis, or a "useless king".

== Early life (1312–1327) ==
Edward was born at Windsor Castle on 13 November 1312, and was described in a contemporary prophecy as "the boar that would come out of Windsor". The reign of his father, Edward II, was a particularly problematic period of English history. (Note: For an account of the political conflicts of Edward II's early years, see John Maddicot's 1970 monograph, Thomas of Lancaster, 1307–1322) The King had alienated several English nobles and Scottish allies by abandoning his father's war with Scotland soon after his accession, and continued to lose battles against the Scots intermittently. Also controversial was the King's patronage of a small group of royal favourites rather than his nobility generally. This, says the historian Michael Prestwich, "unbalanced the whole system of royal patronage". However, the birth of a male heir in 1312 – the future Edward III – improved Edward II's relations with the French, and a moderate element within the nobility temporarily quelled baronial opposition. The young prince was created Earl of Chester at only twelve days old, and by January the following year had been provided with an entire household. An early influence on Prince Edward was the Bishop of Durham, Richard de Bury, one of the century's major bibliophiles. Originally a tutor, he appears to have become a mentor to the King. Under Bury's tutelage, Edward learned to write and to read French and Latin. He would have had access to famous contemporary works, such as Vegetius's De Re Militari, which had been translated into Anglo-Norman, as well as the Mirror for Princes and various psalters and religious texts.

Since the Norman Conquest had united the Duchy of Normandy and its French estates with those of the Crown and the land of England, English kings had held several territories, including Poitou, Aquitaine, Normandy, Anjou and Maine, and these holdings – at one point covering more of France than that held by the French king – had frequently led to conflict. In 1325, Edward II was faced with a demand from his brother-in-law Charles IV of France to perform homage for the English Duchy of Aquitaine. The King was reluctant to leave the country, as discontent was once again brewing domestically, particularly over his relationship with the favourite Hugh Despenser the Younger. (Note: For an account of Edward II's later years, see Natalie Fryde's 1979 The Tyranny and Fall of Edward II, 1321–1326.) Instead, he had his son Edward created Duke of Aquitaine in his place and sent him to France to perform the homage. The young Edward was accompanied by his mother Isabella, who was King Charles's sister and was meant to negotiate a peace treaty with the French. While in France, Isabella conspired with the exiled Roger Mortimer to have Edward II deposed. To build up diplomatic and military support for the venture, Isabella had her son engaged to the twelve-year-old Philippa of Hainault. An invasion of England was launched and Edward II's forces deserted him. Isabella and Mortimer summoned a parliament, and the King was forced to relinquish the throne to his son, who was proclaimed king in London on 25 January 1327. The new king was crowned as Edward III at Westminster Abbey on 1 February at the age of 14. (Note: The later fate of Edward II has been a source of much scholarly debate. For a summary of the evidence, see pages 405–410 of Mortimer's 2006 monograph, The Perfect King: The Life of Edward III, Father of the English Nation)

== Early reign (1327–1337) ==
=== Mortimer's rule and fall ===
One of Edward's first acts – de facto Mortimer's – was to lead another campaign to Scotland in July 1327. It was not long before the new reign also met with other problems caused by the central position of Mortimer at court, who was now the de facto ruler of England. Mortimer used his position to acquire noble estates and titles, and his unpopularity grew with the humiliating defeat by the Scots at the Battle of Stanhope Park in the county of Durham, and the ensuing Treaty of Edinburgh–Northampton, agreed with the Scots in 1328. The young king also came into conflict with his guardian. Mortimer knew his position in relation to the King was precarious and subjected Edward to disrespect. The King married Philippa of Hainault at York Minster on 24 January 1328, and the birth of their first child, Edward of Woodstock, on 15 June 1330 only increased tension with Mortimer. Eventually, the King decided to take direct action against Mortimer. Although so far Edward had kept a low profile, it is likely that he increasingly suspected that Mortimer's behaviour could endanger Edward's own life, as the former's position became more unpopular. This was exacerbated by his execution of Edward's uncle Edmund, Earl of Kent. Contemporary chroniclers suspected, too, that Mortimer had designs on the throne, and it is likely that it was these rumours that encouraged Edward to act against him and his mother, who supposedly maintained a close relationship with Mortimer.

Aided by his close companion William Montagu, 3rd Baron Montagu, and a small number of other trusted men, Edward took Mortimer by surprise and captured him at Nottingham Castle on 19 October 1330. Mortimer was executed and Edward's personal reign began. The historian Mark Ormrod argued that at this point Edward had had "little instruction in the art of kingship", and although he had received several books on the subject on his betrothal to Philippa, "it is extremely doubtful that he read or comprehended these works". His reign, continues Ormrod, was to be guided by his practical, rather than theoretical, experience.

=== War in Scotland ===
Edward III was not content with the peace agreement made in his name, but the renewal of the war with Scotland originated in private, rather than royal initiative. A group of English magnates known as The Disinherited, who had lost land in Scotland by the peace accord, staged an invasion of Scotland and won a great victory at the Battle of Dupplin Moor in 1332. They attempted to install Edward Balliol as king of Scotland in place of the infant David II, but Balliol was soon expelled and was forced to seek the help of Edward III. The English king responded by laying siege to the important border town of Berwick and defeated a large relieving army at the Battle of Halidon Hill, even while under threat from foreign raids. However, Berwick was taken after the besieged Scots set fire to the town, forcing them to treat; at one point Edward's queen was under siege in Bamburgh Castle, but this was too late to save the Scots' campaign. He reinstated Balliol on the throne and received a substantial amount of land in southern Scotland. These victories proved hard to sustain, as forces loyal to David II gradually regained control of the country. A Scottish uprising in 1334 required the raising of another army and a supporting navy. Edward, having repaired Roxburgh Castle, (Note: Burnt by Robert the Bruce in 1314.) launched a number of ineffective strikes against the Scots. In 1338, Edward agreed a truce with the Scots.

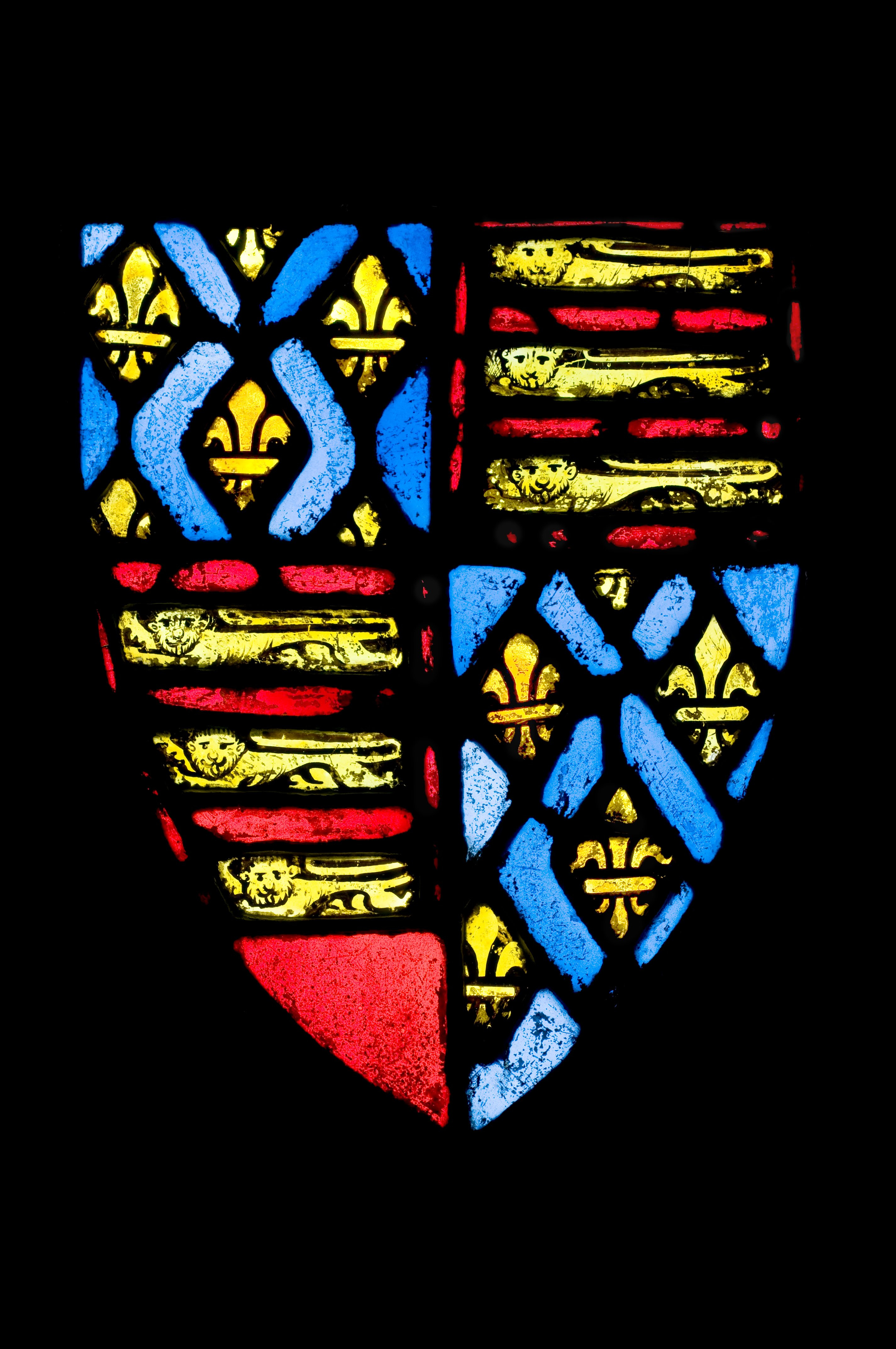
To mark his claim to the French crown, Edward III quartered the arms of France, placing them in the first and fourth quarters. English stained glass, c. 1350 – 1377.

One reason for the change of strategy towards Scotland was a growing concern for the relationship between England and France. As long as Scotland and France were in an alliance, the English were faced with the prospect of fighting a war on two fronts. The French carried out raids on English coastal towns, leading to rumours in England of a full-scale French invasion.

=== Creating a new nobility ===
When Edward took power, he found his family in "complete disarray", says Ormrod. His nobility was divided into factions after the troublesome reign of his father and was weakened by line failure among many families. While the lesser baronage was less affected by political misadventure than their seniors, they were also weaker due to their rights being more insubstantive. Edward had to pacify two noble parties: one which had been against his father from the beginning, and another which had opposed Mortimer's and Isabella's minority regime. James Bothwell argues that, while he managed to reconcile the sides bloodlessly and with minimum acrimony, it was insufficient to leave him secure on his own: he lanced the opposition but had not turned them into a loyalist cadre. Only the Earls of Arundel, Oxford and Warwick could be counted on as loyalists.

To counter the limited loyalty among the aristocrats, following the March 1337 Parliament Edward created six new earls. He also summoned 61 new men to the lords with lesser titles, usually by writ of summons, over the rest of his reign. These creations – although expensive – received very little ill will among the extant aristocracy, including the royal family. The 1337 creations were Hugh de Audley to the Earldom of Gloucester, William de Bohun to that of Northampton, William de Clinton to Huntingdon, Henry of Grosmont to Derby, William de Montagu to Salisbury and Robert de Ufford to Suffolk. Of these, Bohun, Clinton, Montagu and Ufford had played leading roles in Edward's coup against Mortimer; they were likewise the greatest beneficiaries in terms of grants and estates. Another common denominator was that most of them had also been trusted companions of Edward before the coup; Ufford, for example, jousted with him and attended him in his homage before Philip VI of France, while Montagu had been his "closest supporter", and had run secret diplomatic missions to the Pope for him before the coup.

James Bothwell has noted that, while these men may have been less well off before they were promoted, they were not less experienced, either politically or militarily. These promotions were especially important to Edward because it had been from among the earls that his father had created so many bitter enemies, and therefore that was the demography that Edward wanted to reorganise in his favour. These promotions reinforced his own and the Crown's position and, with war approaching, he created six new recruitment conduits from the regions directly to the royal army. For the earls themselves, the prospect was not so positive: due to the parlous state of the royal finances, most of them did not receive a minimum of 1000 marks (Note: A medieval English mark was a unit of currency equivalent to two-thirds of a pound.) a year that was promised to them to uphold their new estate. All except Gloucester (Note: Gloucester was an exception because he had married Margaret de Clare, a co-heiress to the earldom of Gloucester, and this gave him an income of over £2000 a year.) had to be satisfied with irregular grants of land to boost their incomes, but these would often not be available until the incumbent died and they escheated to the King.

== Mid-reign (1337–1360) ==
=== Sluys ===
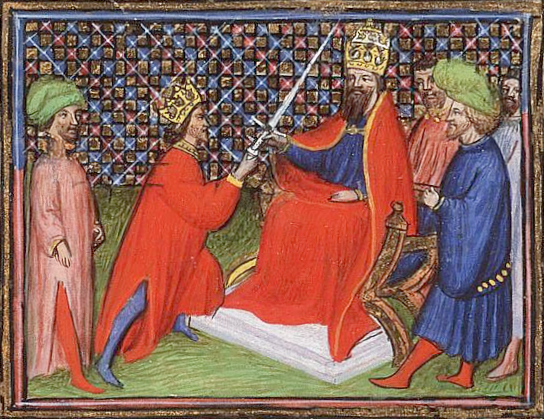
Portrayal of Edward's appointment as Vicar-General of the Holy Roman Empire by Emperor Louis IV in the late fourteenth-century Chronicles of Jean Froissart

In 1337, Philip VI of France confiscated the English king's Duchy of Aquitaine and the county of Ponthieu. Instead of seeking a peaceful resolution to the conflict by paying homage to the French king, as his father had done, Edward responded by laying claim to the French crown as the grandson of Philip IV of France. (Note: Edward did not officially assume the title "King of England and France" until January 1340, partly to reassure his allies on the continent.) The French rejected this based on the precedents for agnatic succession set in 1316 and 1322 and upheld the rights of Philip IV's nephew Philip VI, leading to tensions that caused the Hundred Years' War. In the early stages of the war, Edward's strategy was to build alliances with other Continental rulers. In 1338, Louis IV, Holy Roman Emperor, named Edward Vicar general of the Holy Roman Empire and promised his support. As late as 1373, the Anglo-Portuguese Treaty of 1373 established an Anglo-Portuguese Alliance. These measures produced few results.

The only major military victory during this phase of the war was the English naval victory at Sluys on 24 June 1340, which secured control of the English Channel. This victory decimated a superior French fleet and lowered the threat of a French invasion of England, which increased English desires to attack France. This situation lasted less than a year. Edward was unlikely to have been happy with this victory due to his continuing financial problems. The English also captured 166 French merchantmen; they had been raiding the south coast of England for several years and were unpopular amongst English sailors. Up to 16,000 French sailors were killed and French captain, Nicolas Béhuchet – who could otherwise have expected to be ransomed – was hanged from his own yardarm. Edward saw God's hand in his victory and a triumphal coin was struck in commemoration – showing Edward in a ship, probably meant to be Béhuchet's own – and the King gained a reputation as a naval warrior. (Note: Although Edward fought at Sluys, he did not command the navy; his admiral was Robert Morley, who was greatly rewarded for his seamanship in money, grants and a large pension, indicating that Edward recognised the debt Morley was owed.)

=== Cost of war ===
Meanwhile, the fiscal pressure on the kingdom caused by Edward's expensive alliances led to discontent at home. The regency council at home was frustrated by the mounting national debt, while the King and his commanders on the Continent were angered by the failure of the government in England to provide sufficient funds. To deal with the situation, Edward himself returned to England, arriving in London unannounced on 30 November 1340, having given his wife and children as hostages in the Low-Countries to reassure his creditors. Finding the affairs of the realm in disorder, he purged the royal administration of a great number of ministers and judges. These measures did not bring domestic stability, and a stand-off ensued between the King and John de Stratford, Archbishop of Canterbury, during which Stratford's relatives Robert Stratford, Bishop of Chichester, and Henry de Stratford were temporarily stripped of title and imprisoned respectively. Stratford claimed that Edward had violated the laws of the land by arresting royal officers. A certain level of conciliation was reached at the Parliament of April 1341. Here Edward was forced to accept severe limitations to his financial and administrative freedom, in return for a grant of taxation. Yet in October the same year, Edward repudiated this statute and Archbishop Stratford was politically ostracised. The extraordinary circumstances of the April Parliament had forced the King into submission, but under normal circumstances, the powers of the king in medieval England were virtually unlimited, a fact that Edward was able to exploit.

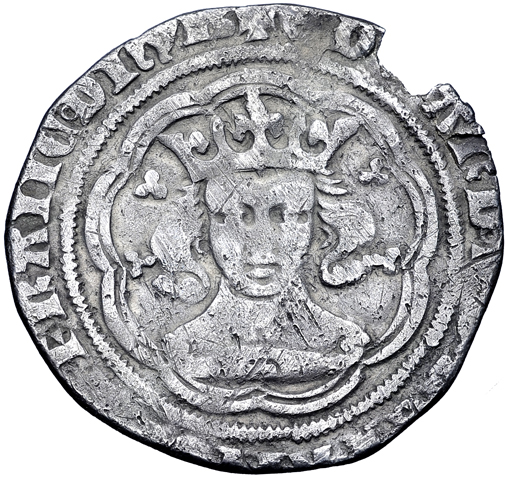
Groat featuring Edward III

Historian Nicholas Rodger called Edward III's claim to be the "Sovereign of the Seas" into question, arguing there was hardly any royal navy before the reign of Henry V (1413–1422). Despite Rodger's view, King John had already developed a royal fleet of galleys and had attempted to establish an administration for these ships and others which were arrested (privately owned ships pulled into royal/national service). Henry III, his successor, continued this work. Notwithstanding the fact that he, along with his predecessor, had hoped to develop a strong and efficient naval administration, their endeavours produced one that was informal and mostly ad hoc. A formal naval administration emerged during Edward's reign, comprising lay administrators and led by William de Clewre, Matthew de Torksey and John de Haytfield successively bearing the title of Clerk of the King's Ships. Robert de Crull was the last to fill this position during Edward III's reign and would have the longest tenure in this position. It was during his tenure that Edward's naval administration would become a base for what evolved during the reigns of successors such as Henry VIII's Council of Marine and Navy Board and Charles I's Board of Admiralty. Rodger also argues that for much of the fourteenth century, the French had the upper hand, apart from Sluys in 1340 and, perhaps, off Winchelsea in 1350. Yet, the French never invaded England and King John II of France died in captivity in England. There was a need for an English navy to play a role in this and to handle other matters, such as the insurrection of the Anglo-Irish lords and acts of piracy.

==== Command structure ====
Edward's military command structure began with himself at the centre, and then members of the court acted as his generals. This included the King's family, and Edward utilised the martial capabilities of his sons, particularly his eldest son, Edward the Black Prince. This was not only pragmatic, in that they were all good warriors, but had the added propaganda value of demonstrating the hereditary nature of Edward's claim to the French throne. (Note: This policy was not confined to Edward III; the French king also employed his three brothers in the command positions, while Edward's successor in the war, Henry V, not only employed his three brothers in France but lost them there too.) However, command was not always the prerogative of the nobility. Knights Banneret – knights able to lead other knights – were also favoured as leaders of armies or divisions, as they were also already close to the king, being part of his household and bodyguard. They bore particular responsibilities during King Edward's chevauchées, which often required the main army to split into smaller forces, each requiring its own captain. This sometimes led to dissension. For example, in the 1369 Loire campaign, the Earl of Pembroke shared command with Sir John Chandos; although the latter was appointed seneschal of France by the Black Prince, Pembroke refused to work beneath him on account of his superior social status. Ultimately, though, the task of raising the armies that they would lead fell to both: the aristocracy could raise the largest number of tenants and retainers after the King, but it was the lower men who acted as recruiting sergeants in the regions. Unlike during his father's or great-grandfather's campaigns in Scotland, the feudal levy ― whereby military service was provided for free in exchange for land rights ― by the outbreak of the Hundred Years' War it had become the norm for men of all ranks to be paid for their service from the King. In return, the crown shouldered the responsibility for paying for the bulk of equipment. The military historian Andrew Ayton has described this transition as amounting to a "military revolution", and one spearheaded by the King himself.

=== Crécy and Poitiers ===
By the early 1340s, it was clear that Edward's policy of alliances was too costly, and yielded too few results. The following years saw more direct involvement by English armies, including in the Breton War of Succession, but these interventions also proved fruitless at first. (Note: The main exception was Henry of Lancaster's victory in the Battle of Auberoche in 1345.) Edward defaulted on large scale Florentine loans, and partly as a result the lenders declared bankruptcy.

A change came in July 1346, when Edward staged a major offensive, sailing for Normandy with a force of 15,000 men. His army sacked the city of Caen, and marched across northern France, to meet up with Flemish forces in Flanders. It was not Edward's initial intention to engage the French army, but at Crécy, just north of the Somme, he found favourable terrain and decided to fight a pursuing army led by Philip VI. On 26 August, the English army defeated a far larger French army in the Battle of Crécy. Shortly after this, on 17 October, an English army defeated and captured King David II of Scotland at the Battle of Neville's Cross. With his northern borders secured, Edward felt free to continue his major offensive against France, laying siege to the town of Calais. The operation was the greatest English venture of the Hundred Years' War, involving an army of 32,000 men. The siege started on 4 September 1346, and lasted until the town surrendered on 3 August 1347.

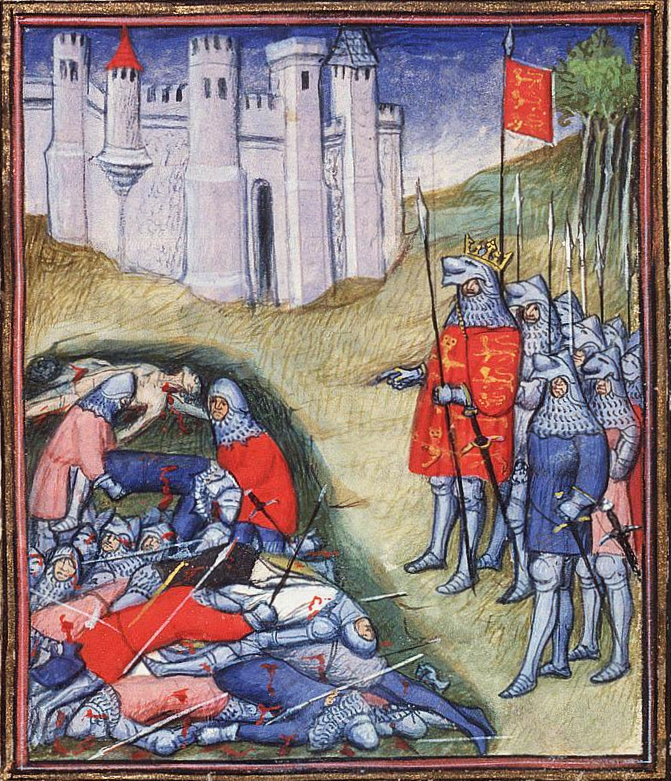
Edward III counting the dead on the battlefield of Crécy

After the fall of Calais, factors outside of Edward's control forced him to wind down the war effort. In 1348, the Black Death struck England with full force, killing a third or more of the country's population. (Note: For more on the debate over mortality rates, see:Hatcher, John (1977). Plague, Population and the English Economy, 1348–1530. London: Macmillan. pp. 11–20. ISBN 0-3332-1293-2.) This loss of manpower led to a shortage of farm labour and a corresponding rise in wages. The great landowners struggled with the shortage of manpower and the resulting inflation in labour cost. To curb the rise in wages, the King and Parliament responded with the Ordinance of Labourers in 1349, followed by the Statute of Labourers in 1351. These attempts to regulate wages could not succeed in the long run, but in the short term they were enforced with great vigour. All in all, the plague did not lead to a full-scale breakdown of government and society, and recovery was remarkably swift. This was to a large extent thanks to the competent leadership of royal administrators such as Treasurer William Edington and Chief Justice William de Shareshull.

It was not until the mid-1350s that military operations on the Continent were resumed on a large scale. In 1356, Edward's eldest son, Edward, Prince of Wales, won an important victory in the Battle of Poitiers. The greatly outnumbered English forces not only routed the French, but captured the French king John II and his youngest son, Philip. After a succession of victories, the English held great possessions in France, the French king was in English custody, and the French central government had almost totally collapsed. There has been a historical debate as to whether Edward's claim to the French crown originally was genuine, or if it was simply a political ploy meant to put pressure on the French government. (Note: For a summary of the debate, see Prestwich 2005, pp. 307–310) Regardless of the original intent, the stated claim now seemed to be within reach. Yet a campaign in 1359, meant to complete the undertaking, was inconclusive. In 1360, therefore, Edward accepted the Treaty of Brétigny, whereby he renounced his claims to the French throne, but secured his extended French possessions in full sovereignty. Edward kept his subjects fully informed of political and military developments abroad by a large number of regular reports from himself and his captains to various outlets, including convocation, the City of London and the archbishops, that, while the scholar A. E. Prince acknowledged that taken singularly, these reports may not represent a cohesive public relations within government, they do perhaps indicate, as a whole, the existence of a "simple propaganda organization" with which the King boosted domestic morale. These then ended up as part of popular chronicles, either verbatim or in part, whether newsletters or public letters.

== Government ==
=== Legislation ===
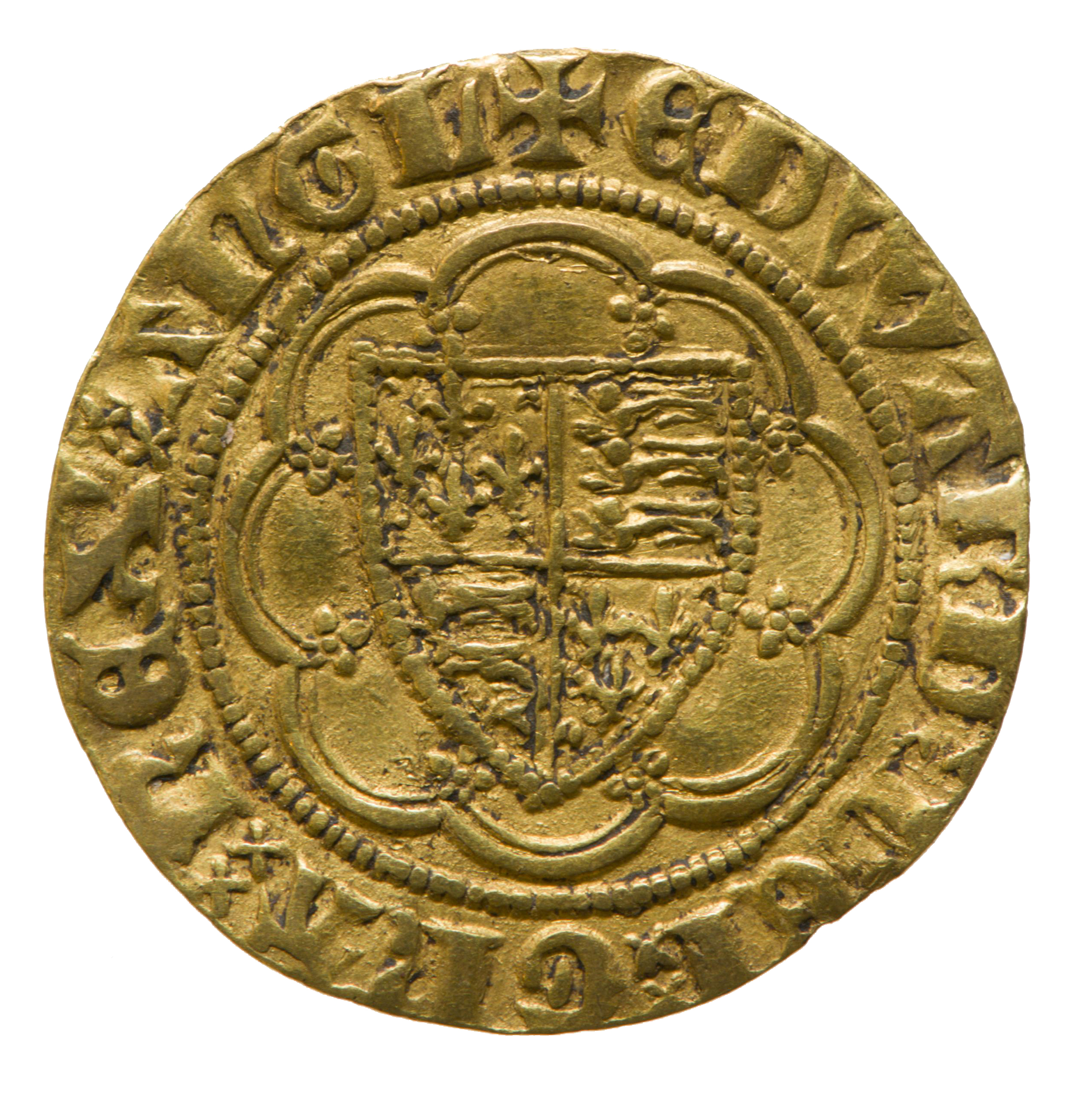
Gold quarter noble of Edward III, York Museums Trust

The middle years of Edward's reign were a period of significant legislative activity. Perhaps the best-known piece of legislation passed was the Statute of Labourers of 1351, which addressed the labour shortage problem caused by the Black Death. The statute fixed wages at their pre-plague level and checked peasant mobility by asserting that lords had the first claim on their men's services. In spite of concerted efforts to uphold the statute, it eventually failed due to intense competition among landowners for labour. The law has been described as an attempt "to legislate against the law of supply and demand", which doomed it to certain failure. Nevertheless, the labour shortage had created a community of interest between the smaller landowners of the House of Commons and the greater landowners of the House of Lords. The resulting measures angered the peasants, leading to the Peasants' Revolt of 1381.

The reign of Edward III coincided with the so-called Babylonian Captivity of the papacy at Avignon. During the wars with France, opposition emerged in England against perceived injustices by a papacy largely controlled by the French crown. Papal taxation of the English Church was suspected to be financing the nation's enemies, while the practice of provisions (the Pope's providing benefices for clerics) caused resentment in the English population. The statutes of Provisors and Praemunire, of 1350 and 1353 respectively, aimed to amend this by banning papal benefices, as well as limiting the power of the papal court over English subjects. The statutes did not sever the ties between the king and the Pope, who were equally dependent upon each other.

Other legislation of importance includes the Treason Act 1351. It was precisely the harmony of the reign that allowed a consensus on the definition of this controversial crime. Yet, the most significant legal reform was probably that concerning the Justices of the Peace. This institution began before the reign of Edward III but, by 1350, the justices had been given the power not only to investigate crimes and make arrests, but also to try cases, including those of felony. With this, an enduring fixture in the administration of local English justice had been established.

=== Parliament and taxation ===
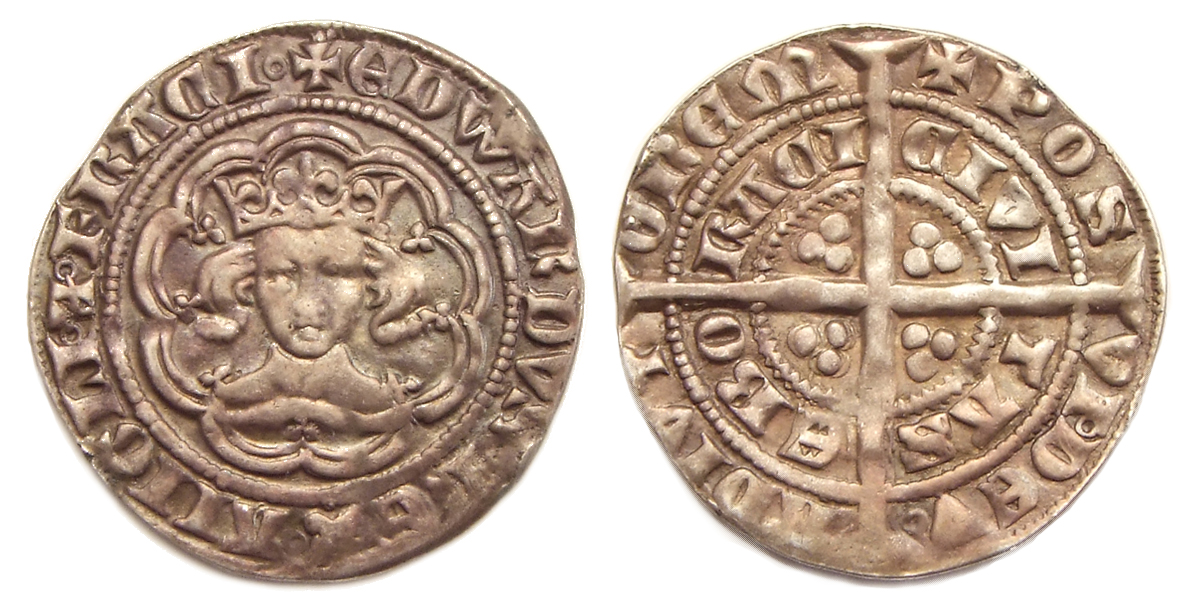
Half groat with portrait of King Edward III, York mint

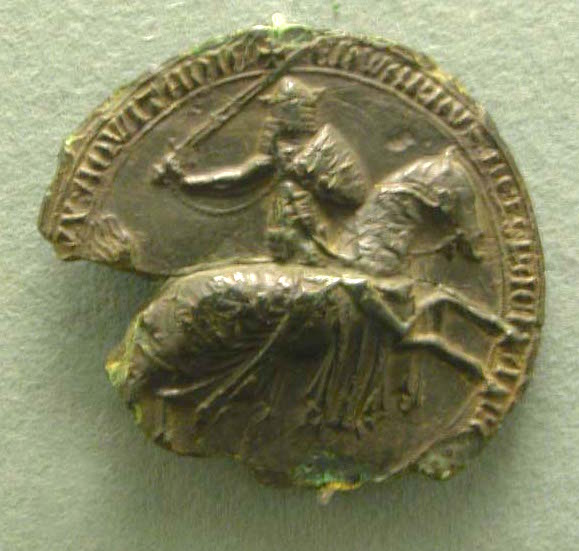
The Great Seal of Edward III

Parliament as a representative institution was already well established by the time of Edward III, but the reign was nevertheless central to its development. During this period, membership in the English baronage, formerly a somewhat indistinct group, became restricted to those who received a personal summons to Parliament. This happened as Parliament gradually developed into a bicameral institution, composed of a House of Lords and a House of Commons. Yet it was not in the Lords, but in the Commons that the greatest changes took place, with the expanding political role of the Commons. Informative is the Good Parliament, where the Commons for the first time – albeit with noble support – were responsible for precipitating a political crisis. In the process, both the procedure of impeachment and the office of the Speaker were created. Even though the political gains were of only temporary duration, this parliament represented a watershed in English political history.

The political influence of the Commons originally lay in their right to grant taxes. The financial demands of the Hundred Years' War were enormous, and the King and his ministers tried different methods of covering the expenses. Edward had a steady income from crown lands, and could also take up substantial loans from Italian and domestic financiers. To finance warfare, he had to resort to taxation of his subjects. Taxation took two primary forms: levy and customs. The levy was a grant of a proportion of all moveable property, normally a tenth for towns and a fifteenth for farmland. This could produce large sums of money, but each such levy had to be approved by Parliament, and the king had to prove the necessity. The customs therefore provided a welcome supplement, as a steady and reliable source of income. An "ancient duty" on the export of wool had existed since 1275. Edward I had tried to introduce an additional duty on wool, but this unpopular maltolt, or "unjust exaction", was soon abandoned. Then, from 1336 onwards, a series of schemes aimed at increasing royal revenues from wool export were introduced. After some initial problems and discontent, it was agreed through the Statute of the Staple of 1353 that the new customs should be approved by Parliament, though in reality, they became permanent.

Through the steady taxation of Edward III's reign, Parliament – and in particular the Commons – gained political influence. A consensus emerged that in order for a tax to be just, the King had to prove its necessity, it had to be granted by the community of the realm, and it had to be to the benefit of that community. In addition to imposing taxes, Parliament would also present petitions for redress of grievances to the King, most often concerning misgovernment by royal officials. This way the system was beneficial for both parties. Through this process, the Commons, and the community they represented, became increasingly politically aware, and the foundation was laid for the particular English brand of constitutional monarchy. It became the norm for the king's ministers to argue his case before Parliament, the Commons to grant the king the tax he requested, and then the king's concessions to Parliament would be announced at its end.

The King occasionally attempted to avoid resorting to Parliament to raise taxes, such as in 1338 when he attempted a forced loan on wool. This soon collapsed – in the words of E. B. Fryde it was a "lamentable failure" – and once again, Edward had to return to Parliament. Edward also attempted to reinforce what he believed to be his ancient rights, such as the return of all goods and chattels of felons to the Crown, and scutage, as well as new proposals, such as that debts should be repaid to the Crown in one payment rather than incrementally. All these schemes collapsed, however, the latter because the lords claimed that such a method of taxation infringed upon their traditional rights. According to Fryde, "one of Edward's most onerous and wasteful liabilities" came in February 1339, when he effectively pawned the Great Crown of England to the Archbishop of Trier, for which the King promised repayment of £16,650. Edward met his creditors in Ghent in 1340, but, unable to immediately satisfy their demands, notes Bertie Wilkinson, "pretending that he wanted to take a walk, he secretly rode away".

=== Chivalry and national identity ===
Central to Edward III's policy was reliance on the higher nobility for purposes of war and administration. While Edward II had regularly been in conflict with a great portion of his peerage, his son successfully created a spirit of camaraderie between himself and his greatest subjects. Both Edward I and Edward II had been limited in their policy towards the nobility, allowing the creation of few new peerages during the sixty years preceding Edward III's reign. Edward III reversed this trend when, in 1337, as a preparation for the imminent war, he created six new earls on the same day.

At the same time, Edward expanded the ranks of the peerage upwards, by introducing the new title of duke for close relatives of the king; creating the first three dukedoms of England (Cornwall, Lancaster, and Clarence). His eldest son Edward, the Black Prince, was created Duke of Cornwall, the first English Duke, in 1337. In 1351 the Earl of Lancaster was elevated to the Dukedom of Lancaster. Furthermore, Edward bolstered the sense of community within this group by the creation of a new order of chivalry. In January 1344 a great feast was held in Windsor Castle to which large numbers were invited; not just the lords but the City of London also sent a contingent. The first night saw a feast at which all the attending ladies, with only two knights among them, dined, while the other men ate in their tents. This was followed by jousting over the next three days, where Edward – "not because of his kingly rank but because of his great exertions", Adam Murimuth claims in his chronicle – was deemed champion. This was followed by the King's announcement of the founding of the Round Table of King Arthur, to which "certain lords" took an oath. The first meeting of the new chapter was arranged for the following Whitsun. (Note: Whitsun was the seventh Sunday after Easter, so the meeting was to take place on 23 May 1344.) Nothing, however, was to come of the project; as Murimuth comments, "this work was later stopped for various reasons".

Instead, around four years later, Edward founded the Order of the Garter, probably in 1348. The new order carried connotations from the legend by the circular shape of the garter. Edward's wartime experiences during the Crécy campaign (1346–7) seem to have been a determining factor in his abandonment of the Round Table project. It has been argued that the total warfare tactics employed by the English at Crécy in 1346 were contrary to Arthurian ideals and made Arthur a problematic paradigm for Edward, especially at the time of the institution of the Garter. There are no formal references to King Arthur and the Round Table in the surviving early fifteenth century copies of the Statutes of the Garter, but the Garter Feast of 1358 did involve a round table game. Thus, there was some overlap between the projected Round Table fellowship and the actualized Order of the Garter. Polydore Vergil tells of how the young Joan of Kent – allegedly the King's favourite at the time – accidentally dropped her garter at a ball at Calais. Edward responded to the ensuing ridicule of the crowd by tying the garter around his own knee with the words honi soit qui mal y pense (shame on him who thinks ill of it).

This reinforcement of the aristocracy and the emerging sense of an English national identity must be seen in conjunction with the war in France. Just as the war with Scotland had done, the fear of a French invasion helped strengthen a sense of national unity and nationalise the aristocracy that had been largely Anglo-Norman since the Norman Conquest. Since the time of Edward I, popular myth suggested that the French planned to extinguish the English language, and as his grandfather had done, Edward III made the most of this scare. As a result, the English language experienced a strong revival during Edward III's reign; in 1362, a Statute of Pleading ordered English to be used in law courts, and the year after, Parliament was for the first time opened in English. At the same time, the vernacular saw a revival as a literary language, through the works of William Langland, John Gower and especially The Canterbury Tales by Geoffrey Chaucer. Yet the extent of this Anglicisation must not be exaggerated. The statute of 1362 was in fact written in the French language and had little immediate effect, and Parliament was opened in that language as late as 1377. The Order of the Garter, though a distinctly English institution, included also foreign members such as John IV, Duke of Brittany, and Robert of Namur.

== Later reign (1360–1377) ==
=== Further campaigns in France and governance ===
While Edward's early reign had been energetic and successful, his later years were marked by inertia, military failure and political strife. The day-to-day affairs of the state had less appeal to Edward than military campaigning, so during the 1360s Edward increasingly relied on the help of his subordinates, in particular William Wykeham. (Note: For more on Wykeham, see:Davis, Virginia (2007). William Wykeham. Hambledon Continuum. ISBN 978-1-8472-5172-5.) A relative upstart, Wykeham was made Keeper of the Privy Seal in 1363 and Chancellor in 1367, though due to political difficulties connected with his inexperience, the Parliament forced him to resign the chancellorship in 1371. Compounding Edward's difficulties were the deaths of his most trusted men, some from the 1361–62 recurrence of the plague. William Montagu, 1st Earl of Salisbury, Edward's companion in the 1330 coup, died as early as 1344. William de Clinton, 1st Earl of Huntingdon, who had also been with Edward at Nottingham, died in 1354. One of the earls created in 1337, William de Bohun, 1st Earl of Northampton, died in 1360, and the next year Henry of Grosmont, Duke of Lancaster, perhaps the greatest of Edward's captains, succumbed to what was probably plague. Their deaths left the majority of the magnates younger and more naturally aligned to the princes than to the King himself.

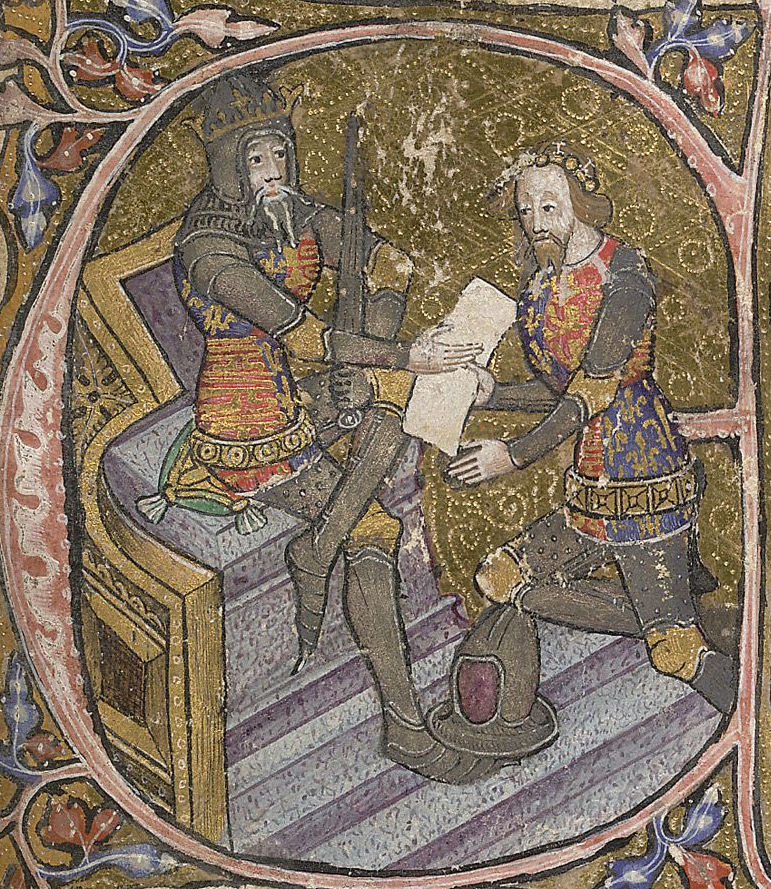
King Edward III grants Aquitaine to his son Edward the Black Prince. Initial letter "E" of miniature, 1390; British Library, London, shelfmark: Cotton MS Nero D VI, f.31.

Increasingly, Edward began to rely on his sons for the leadership of military operations. The king's second son, Lionel of Antwerp, attempted to subdue by force the largely autonomous Anglo-Irish lords in Ireland. The venture failed, and the only lasting mark he left was the suppressive Statutes of Kilkenny in 1366. In France, meanwhile, the decade following the Treaty of Brétigny was one of relative tranquillity, but on 8 April 1364, John II died in captivity in England, after unsuccessfully trying to raise his own ransom at home. He was followed by the vigorous Charles V, who enlisted the help of the capable Bertrand du Guesclin, Constable of France In 1369, the French war started anew, and Edward's son John of Gaunt was given the responsibility of a military campaign. The effort failed, and with the Treaty of Bruges in 1375, the great English possessions in France were reduced to only the coastal towns of Calais, Bordeaux, and Bayonne.

==== Alice Perrers ====
Alice Perrers was originally one of Philippa's household ladies, having been appointed by 1359. Within five years, by which time she would have been 18, and after the death of her husband, she is speculated to have become the lover of the elderly King. She maintained an active business life outside her career in the royal household, particularly as a moneylender, while also making the most out of her royal connections, accepted gifts from courtiers and those wishing to further their causes with the King. Edward presented her with gifts, including land, manors and jewels, and in 1371 these included those of the now-dead Philippa. Alice, in what may have been an attempt to keep her new estates after the King's death, tied them up in a series of enfeoffments. This meant that legally they ceased to be royal gifts which could be resumed to the Crown, but hers to receive from her feoffees when she chose. These gifts included 50 manors in 25 counties and £20,000 in jewels. The contemporary chronicler Thomas Walsingham saw her as a low-born woman who, through her own ambition, made a fortune from the besotted King; and this was the popular view presented to the Good Parliament of 1376, in which she was also accused of taking 2000 to 3000 pounds in gold and silver per annum from the royal treasury. Another contemporary, the Anonimalle Chronicler, complained that this was all "without any notable profit and in great damage to our lord the king", and urged that Alice be removed from the King's circle even though he was still living, albeit known to be dying. Modern historians have credited her with more agency than merely using "womanly wiles" to get her own way, noting her head for business and the law. Bothwell also notes that she probably recognised the future precariousness of her position after the King died – "which it was obvious to all in the 1370s was imminent" – and intended to use much of her wealth to provide for her two daughters, whose lives would be even more precarious in the following reign. She was correct in this expectation. Edward could not prevent her banishment during the Good Parliament, though she had returned to his inner circle later that year and remained there until his death. However, in 1378 (first year of Richard II's reign) she was put on trial before Parliament. She was found guilty and sentenced to exile. Further, her property was forfeited to the Crown.

=== Discontent at home ===
Military failure abroad, and the associated fiscal pressure of constant campaigns, led to political discontent in England. Finance was a particular grievance; although it was rarely raised as an issue before 1371, after that time complaints about the royal household's expenditure were frequent. (Note: Not only under the remainder of Edward III's reign; Given-Wilson has said that they continued throughout most of Richard II's and Henry IV's reigns also.) The problems came to a head in the Parliament of 1376, the so-called Good Parliament. The Parliament was called to grant taxation, but the House of Commons took the opportunity to address specific grievances. In particular, criticism was directed at some of the King's closest advisors. Lord Chamberlain William Latimer, 4th Baron Latimer, and Steward of the Household John Neville, 3rd Baron Neville de Raby, were dismissed from their positions. Edward III's mistress, Alice Perrers, who was seen to hold far too much power over the ageing king, was banished from court.

Yet the real adversary of the Commons, supported by powerful men such as Wykeham and Edmund Mortimer, 3rd Earl of March, was John of Gaunt. Both the King and Edward of Woodstock were by this time incapacitated by illness, leaving Gaunt in virtual control of government. Gaunt was forced to give in to the demands of Parliament, but at its next convocation in 1377, most of the achievements of the Good Parliament were reversed and a poll tax was instituted to pay for the war.

=== Death and succession ===
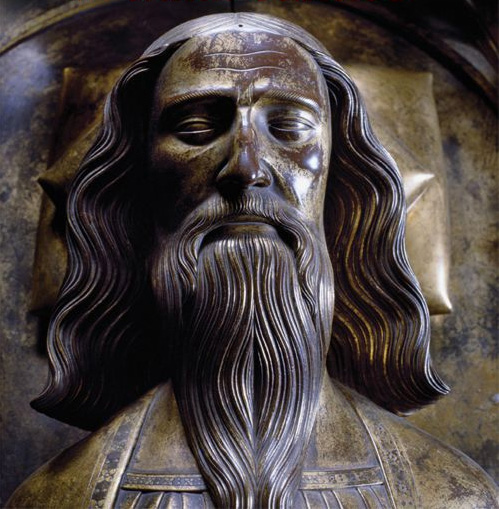
Edward III's funerary monument in Westminster Abbey

Edward III did not have much to do with any of this; after around 1375 he played a limited role in the government of the realm. Around 29 September 1376, he fell ill with a large abscess. After a brief period of recovery in February 1377, the King died of a stroke at Sheen on 21 June.

Edward III was succeeded by his ten-year-old grandson, King Richard II, son of Edward of Woodstock, since Woodstock himself had died on 8 June 1376. In 1376, Edward had signed letters patent on the order of succession to the crown, citing in second position his third son John of Gaunt, but ignoring Philippa, daughter of his second son Lionel of Antwerp, Duke of Clarence. Philippa's exclusion contrasted with a decision by Edward I in 1290, which had recognized the right of women to inherit the crown and to pass it on to their descendants. The order of succession determined in 1376 led the House of Lancaster to the throne in 1399 (Gaunt was Duke of Lancaster), whereas the rule decided by Edward I would have favoured Philippa's descendants, among them the House of York, beginning with Richard of York, her great-grandson. The large number of cousins that were created is sometimes argued to have laid the foundations for the Wars of the Roses in the fifteenth century.

== Family ==
Edward III and his wife Philippa had seven sons and five daughters born over a 25-year period. This was considered a success by contemporaries and a sign of God's favour. Edward understood the importance of a "strong and united royal family", argues Ormrod. It allowed him, through their marriages, to make alliances within his own aristocracy and also with continental dynasties. However, the latter policy gradually fell apart with the gradual loss of England's European possessions towards the end of the century. For example, he organised the marriage of his sister Eleanor of Woodstock to the Count of Guelders as part of a pro-Netherlandish, anti-French policy in 1332. Yet when the coalition collapsed in 1340, the fact that he had only lost her in that particular marriage market was a positive. From around this time, says Ormrod, "the Hundred Years' War became a family enterprise": Edward the Black Prince commanded a force at Crécy, and ten years later his younger brothers Lionel, John and Edmund had joined the war. However, while his sons were fighting in France, they could not be procreating the royal line; by 1358, only Lionel had married and provided Edward with a grandchild. By the mid-1360s his family had furthered his continental policy, both diplomatically and militarily, sufficiently that he allowed his son Edward and his daughter Isabella to do that rarest of things in the Middle Ages: marry for love. Neither the former's match with Joan of Kent and the latter's to Enguerrand VII de Coucy, were particularly advantageous to the King; the first was a clandestine marriage, while de Courcy was a French hostage. Ormrod concludes that, by 1376:

Edward III's greatest misfortune was that he lived long enough to witness the complete collapse of [his] elaborate dynastic plan. By 1377, the king's family had been depleted, his territories reduced, his diplomacy wrecked, and his own control of affairs nullified.

A fourth son, Thomas of Windsor, is also sometimes posited as being born in 1347 and dying the following year. However, the historian Kathryn Warner has suggested that, as William of Woodstock was also born and died the same year, and combined with the paucity of material evidence, it is likely that this Thomas is a composite. She argues that "the entire existence of 'Thomas of Windsor' in some modern books and websites appears to be based on the spurious story by two chroniclers that Philippa was heavily pregnant when she interceded for the Calais burghers in early August 1347". She also notes that for William, who also died young, there is much evidence for his existence, including "his funeral or tomb, or for the queen's purification after his birth, or for any kind of celebration held to mark the birth of another royal child". The medievalist Nicholas Orme has noted that medieval chroniclers were particularly accurate when it came to recording royal births.

The geneticist Adam Rutherford has calculated Edward had over 300 great-great-grandchildren and, therefore, over 20,000 descendants by 1600. Thus, by the 21st century, it is "virtually impossible" that a person with a predominantly British ancestry is not descended from Edward III, as they would have around 32,000 ancestors from 1600. Rutherford has calculated that statistically, the odds on a 20th-century British person not being descended from Edward III is 0.995^{32,768} = 4.64 × 10^{−72}. (Note: Rutherford argues that "if you have any broadly British ancestral lineage, you are descended from Edward III and all of his regal ancestors, too, including William the Conqueror, Æthelred the Unready, Alfred the Great, and, in fact, literally every tenth-century European ruler and peasant".) Conversely, Who Do You Think You Are? Magazine in 2024 reported that "legitimate and illegitimate descendants of Edward III are believed to be in excess of four million." In 2021, Graham Holton, a tutor for a postgraduate genealogy course at the University of Strathclyde, estimated there to be about two million living descendants of Edward I.

=== Issue ===
- Edward the Black Prince (1330–1376), eldest son and heir apparent, born at Woodstock Palace, Oxfordshire. He predeceased his father, having in 1361 married his cousin Joan, Countess of Kent, by whom he had issue: King Richard II;
- Isabella of England (1332 – c. 1382), born at Woodstock Palace, Oxfordshire, in 1365 married Enguerrand VII de Coucy, 1st Earl of Bedford, by whom she had issue;
- Joan of England (1333/4 – 1348), born in the Tower of London; she was betrothed to Peter of Castile but died of the Black Death en route to Castile before the marriage could take place. Peter's two daughters from his union with María de Padilla married Joan's younger brothers John of Gaunt and Edmund of Langley;
- William of Hatfield (1337–1337), second son, born at Hatfield Manor House, Hatfield, South Yorkshire, died shortly after birth and was buried in York Minster;
- Lionel of Antwerp, 1st Duke of Clarence (1338–1368), third son (second surviving son), born at Antwerp in the Duchy of Brabant, where his father was based. In 1352 he married firstly Elizabeth de Burgh, 4th Countess of Ulster, without male issue, but his female issue was the senior royal ancestor of the Yorkist king Edward IV: Philippa, 5th Countess of Ulster. Descent from Lionel was the basis of the Yorkist claim to the throne, not direct paternal descent from the 1st Duke of York, a more junior line. Secondly, in 1368, Lionel married Violante Visconti, without issue;
- John of Gaunt, Duke of Lancaster (1340–1399), Edward's third surviving son, was born at "Gaunt" (Ghent) in the County of Flanders, which city was an important buyer of English wool, then the foundation of English prosperity. In 1359, he married firstly his third cousin, the great heiress Blanche of Lancaster, descended from the 1st Earl of Lancaster, a younger son of King Henry III. By Blanche he had issue: Henry of Bolingbroke, who became King Henry IV, having seized the throne from his first cousin King Richard II. In 1371, he married secondly the Infanta Constance of Castile, by whom he had issue. In 1396, he married thirdly, his mistress Katherine Swynford, by whom he had illegitimate issue, later legitimised as the House of Beaufort;
- Edmund of Langley, 1st Duke of York (1341–1402), fifth son (fourth surviving son), born at Kings Langley Palace, Hertfordshire. He married firstly Isabella of Castile, by whom he had issue, sister of Constance of Castile, second wife of his elder brother John of Gaunt, 1st Duke of Lancaster. Secondly, in 1392 he married his second cousin Joan Holland, without issue. His great-grandson (the 4th Duke of York) became King Edward IV in 1461, having deposed his half-second cousin the Lancastrian King Henry VI;
- Blanche (1342–1342), born in the Tower of London, died shortly after birth and was buried in Westminster Abbey;
- Mary of Waltham (1344–1361), born at Bishop's Waltham, Hampshire; in 1361 she married John IV, Duke of Brittany, without issue;
- Margaret (Countess of Pembroke) (1346–1361), born at Windsor Castle; in 1359 she married John Hastings, 2nd Earl of Pembroke, without issue;
- William of Windsor (1348–1348), sixth son, born before 24 June 1348 at Windsor Castle, died in infancy probably on 9 July 1348, buried on 5 September 1348 in Westminster Abbey;
- Thomas of Woodstock, Duke of Gloucester (1355–1397), seventh son (fifth surviving son), born at Woodstock Palace in Oxfordshire; in 1376 he married Eleanor de Bohun, by whom he had issue.

== Ancestry ==
Ancestors of Edward III

8. Henry III, King of England
4. Edward I, King of England
9. Eleanor of Provence
2. Edward II, King of England
10. Ferdinand III, King of Castile
5. Eleanor, Countess of Ponthieu
11. Joan, Countess of Ponthieu
1. Edward III of England
12. Philip III, King of France
6. Philip IV, King of France
13. Isabella of Aragon
3. Isabella of France
14. Henry I, King of Navarre
7. Joan I, Queen of Navarre
15. Blanche of Artois

== Personality ==
Mark Ormrod has noted that in this period, politics was often dictated by the personality and character of the king. It was also understood that not only should a king rule well and wisely, but that he should be seen to do so. Ormrod argues that, while Edward III did not begin his reign with these skills, unlike many of his fellow Plantagenet kings, he acquired them. His collection of chronicles indicates an interest in history, even to the extent that on occasion, he consulted their authors. (Note: For example, in 1352, he enquired of Ranulf Higden regarding the latter's own Polychronicon.) He may have been particularly keen to emulate Henry II and Edward I, whose own martial prowess and success would have resonated with him. His tastes were conventional, Ormrod says, and J. R. Lander also has argued that this is reflected in his hobbies. Unlike his father's passion for manual work, including carpentry, thatching and rowing, Edward III "shared to the full the conventional tastes and pleasure of the aristocracy", with his principal interest being architecture. (Note: Ormrod estimates Edward to have spent around £130,000 on expanding Windsor and other castles, as well as chapels, hunting lodges and palaces.) This conservativism is reflected in his religious views, which, expressed as they were through the patronage of friaries and visiting of shrines, demonstrate a conventional religion. This is also reflected in his almsgiving. While ancestors such as Henry III had often been haphazard and exuberant in the amounts they gave and when they did so, Edward III maintained a regular 366 meals a week to be provided for the poor with another £25 to be distributed during the four main feasts. (Note: These being Christmas, Easter, Pentecost and Michaelmas.) Alongside his conventionality ran a populist streak, and Ormrod has described him as a "natural showman", particularly in his alacrity to heal those suffering from scrofula by his royal touch. (Note: This was a form of laying on of hands healing. In reality, the disease had a high recovery rate and often went into remission naturally, leaving the impression that the King had cured it.) In less than two years, between 1338 and 1340, he touched for scrofula in both England and while campaigning in France; another 355 occurred between November 1340 and the same month the following year. He was generous to the point of extravagance. In an alternative view, Norman Cantor has described Edward as an "avaricious and sadistic thug".

From what is known of Edward's character, he could be impulsive and temperamental, as was seen by his actions against Stratford and the ministers in 1340/41. Other escapades were not just impulsive but dangerous, such as in 1349, when he sailed to Calais with only a small bodyguard. At the same time, he was well known for his clemency; Mortimer's grandson was not only absolved, he came to play an important part in the French wars and was eventually made a Knight of the Garter. His favourite pursuit was the art of war and, in this, he conformed to the medieval notion of good kingship. As a warrior he was so successful that one modern military historian has described him as the greatest general in English history. He seems to have been unusually devoted to Queen Philippa. Much has been made of Edward's sexual licentiousness, but there is no evidence of any infidelity on his part before Alice Perrers became his lover, and by that time the Queen was already terminally ill. This devotion extended to the rest of the family as well; in contrast to many of his predecessors, Edward never experienced opposition from any of his five adult sons.

== Legacy ==
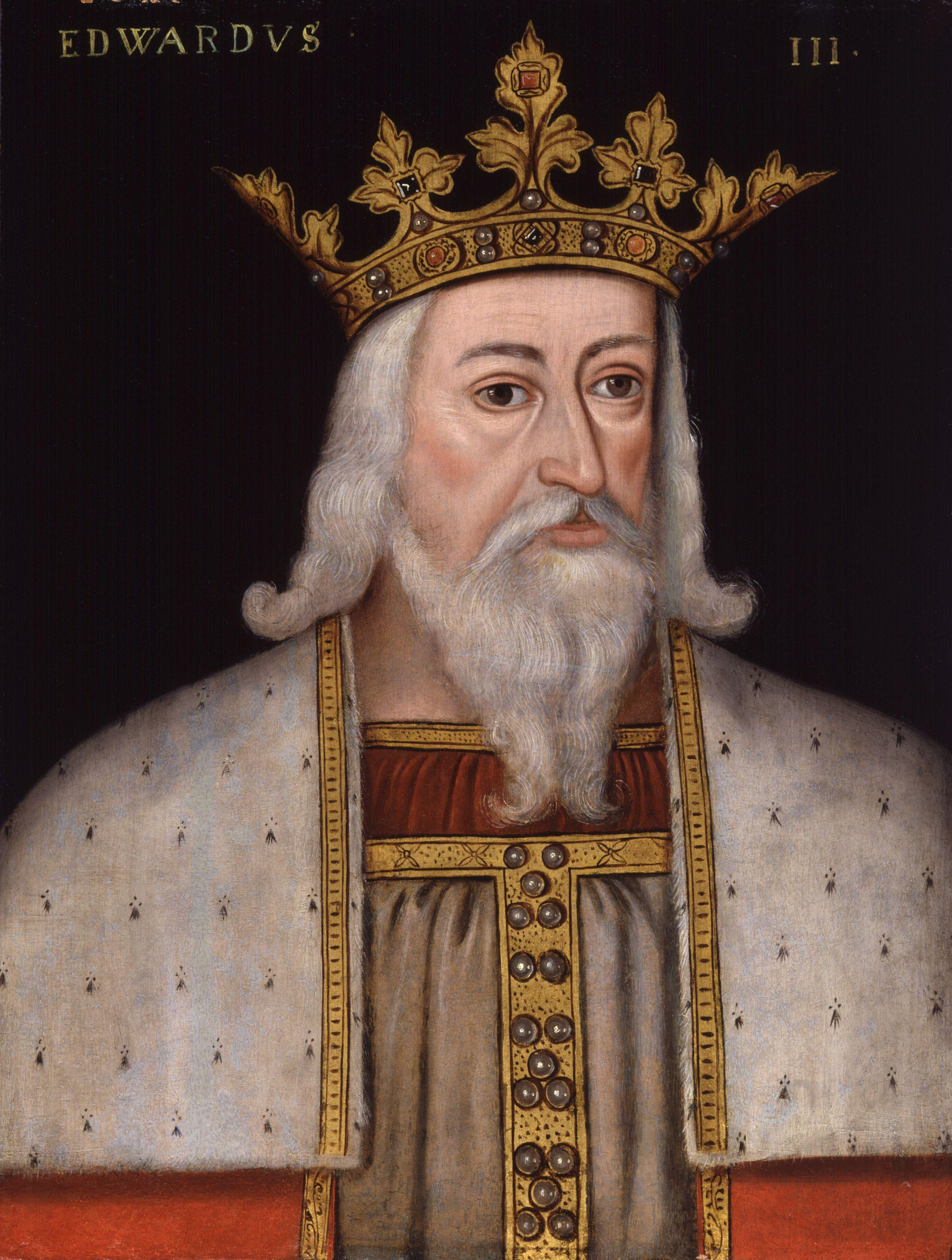
Edward III as he was depicted in the late 16th century

Edward III, argues the scholar Michael A.R. Graves, left a "dual legacy". These were the large brood of children and grandchildren he left, and his claim to the French throne. In the first instance, his endowment of his sons as Dukes of Clarence, Lancaster and York allowed them to create their own dynasties which were both part of the royal family and the aristocracy, which, following Henry Bolingbroke's usurpation of Edward's grandson, Richard II, "bedevilled" the Lancastrian dynasty. Secondly, while the resumption of Edward's claims and war in France was initially successful—contemporaries compared Henry V's decisive victory at Agincourt with Edward's at Crécy and Poitiers—when the tide turned against the English in France, the dynasty was also weakened. Indeed, war in France was problematic for the House of York as well as Lancaster. Edward IV was probably consciously following in his namesake's footsteps when he invaded France in 1475, even if the subsequent Treaty of Picquigny was wholly unintended. Edward IV's reign looked back on that of Edward III – with its martial and administrative progress – as something to model their own on, argues Morgan. Edward IV's own Household Books, summarise the approach as "we take to bylde upon a more perfit new house", and indeed many of their grants and warrants contain a final clause that whatever was under discussion should be as they were in Edward III's final year. Even the final destruction of the Plantagenets at Bosworth in 1485 failed to impinge on Edward III's posthumous image; he was also the most recent king Henry VII could lay claim of descent from.

== Historiography ==
Edward III enjoyed unprecedented popularity in his own lifetime, and even the troubles of his later reign were never blamed directly on the King himself. His contemporary Jean Froissart wrote in his Chronicles: "His like had not been seen since the days of King Arthur." His having many children, most of whom survived into adulthood, was seen as a sign of divine grace. D. A. L. Morgan has drawn attention to the continuing popularity of Edward into the next century, observing that "by 1500 Edward III was well into his stride as the greatest King ever to have ruled England", quoting The Great Chronicle of London which stated that Henry VII, if not for his avarice, "mygth have been pereless of alle princis that regnyd ovyr England syne the tyme of Edward the thyrd". This view persisted for a while but, with time, Edward's image changed. The Whig historians of the 19th century preferred constitutional reform to foreign conquest and accused Edward of ignoring his responsibilities to his own nation. Bishop Stubbs, in his The Constitutional History of England, states:

Edward III was not a statesman, though he possessed some qualifications which might have made him a successful one. He was a warrior; ambitious, unscrupulous, selfish, extravagant and ostentatious. His obligations as a king sat very lightly on him. He felt himself bound by no special duty, either to maintain the theory of royal supremacy or to follow a policy which would benefit his people. Like Richard I, he valued England primarily as a source of supplies.

Mark Ormrod writes that historians may have gone too far in rejecting the medieval positive view of Edward, not taking into account the problems he had to solve and the number of different factions he had to accommodate to get things done. 20th-century scholarship, he suggests, has "tended to be rather kinder". In a 1960 article, May McKisack points out the teleological nature of Stubbs' judgement. A medieval king could not be expected to work towards some future ideal of a parliamentary monarchy as if it were good in itself; rather, his role was a pragmatic one – to maintain order and solve problems as they arose. At this, Edward excelled. K. B. McFarlane rejected the view that Edward endowed his younger sons too liberally and thereby promoted dynastic strife culminating in the Wars of the Roses; he argued that this was not only the common policy of the age, but also the best. (Note: See also the positive evaluation of Edward's policies toward his family members in Ormrod 1987.) Later biographers of Edward such as Ormrod and Ian Mortimer have followed this historiographical trend. The older negative view has not completely disappeared; Cantor has argued that Edward was a "destructive and merciless force". Chris Given-Wilson and Michael Prestwich, in their introduction to the proceedings of a 1999 conference on Edward's reign, observe that "for the moment […] there can be no doubt that Edward III's reputation rests secure."

== Later events ==
Edward's grandson, the young Richard II, faced political and economic problems, many resulting from the Black Death, including the Peasants' Revolt that broke out across the south of England in 1381. Over the coming decades, Richard and groups of nobles vied for power and control of policy towards France until Henry of Bolingbroke seized the throne with the support of Parliament in 1399. Ruling as Henry IV, he exercised power through a royal council and Parliament, while attempting to enforce political and religious conformity. His son, Henry V, reinvigorated the war with France and came close to achieving strategic success shortly before his death in 1422. Henry VI became king at the age of only nine months and both the English political system and the military situation in France began to unravel.

A sequence of bloody civil wars – later termed the Wars of the Roses – erupted in 1455, spurred on by an economic crisis and a widespread perception of poor government. The idea that Edward III was to blame for the later-15th century Wars of the Roses was prevalent as late as the 19th century, but came to be challenged in the 20th.

== Sources ==
- Allmand, Christopher (1988). The Hundred Years War: England and France at War c. 1300–1450. Cambridge: Cambridge University Press. ISBN 0-5212-6499-5.
- Ayton, Andrew (1994). Knights and Warhorses: Military Service and the English Aristocracy under Edward III. Woodbridge: Boydell Press. ISBN 978-0-8511-5568-5.
- Barber, R. (2004a). "Chandos, Sir John (d. 1370)". Oxford Dictionary of National Biography (online ed.). Oxford University Press. doi:10.1093/ref:odnb/5110. ISBN 978-0-19-861412-8. (Subscription, Wikipedia Library access or UK public library membership required.)
- Barber, R. (2004b). "Edward [Edward of Woodstock; Known as the Black Prince], Prince of Wales and of Aquitaine (1330–1376), Heir to the English throne and Military Commander". Oxford Dictionary of National Biography (online ed.). Oxford University Press. doi:10.1093/ref:odnb/8523. (Subscription, Wikipedia Library access or UK public library membership required.)
- Barber, R. W. (2007). "The Round Table Feast of 1344". In Munby, J.; Barber, R. W.; Brown, R. (eds.). Edward III's Round Table at Windsor: The House of the Round Table and the Windsor Festival of 1344. Arthurian Studies. Vol. 68. Woodbridge: Boydell Press. pp. 38–43. ISBN 978-1-84383-313-0.
- Barber, R. (2013). Edward III and the Triumph of England: The Battle of Crécy and the Company of the Garter. London: Penguin. ISBN 978-1-84614-763-0.
- Bennett, Michael (1998). "Edward III's Entail and the Succession to the Crown, 1376–1471". The English Historical Review. 113 (452): 580–609. doi:10.1093/ehr/CXIII.452.580.
- Berard, Christopher (2012). "Edward III's Abandoned Order of the Round Table". Arthurian Literature. 29: 1–40. ISBN 978-1-8438-4333-7. JSTOR 10.7722/j.ctt1x71zc.
- Berard, C. (2016). "Edward III's Abandoned Order of the Round Table Revisited: Political Arthurianism after Poitiers". Arthurian Literature. 33: 70–109. Archived from the original on 1 February 2017.
- Bevan, B. (1994). Henry IV. New York: Palgrave Macmillan. ISBN 978-0-31211-697-2.
- Bothwell, James (1997). "Edward III and the 'New Nobility': Largesse and Limitation in Fourteenth-Century England". The English Historical Review. 112 (449): 1111–1140. doi:10.1093/ehr/CXII.449.1111. JSTOR 577101.
- Bothwell, James (1998). "The Management of Position: Alice Perrers, Edward III, and the Creation of a Landed Estate, 1362–1377". Journal of Medieval History. 24: 31–51. doi:10.1016/S0304-4181(97)00017-1.
- Bothwell, James (2001). "Edward III, the English Peerage, and the 1337 Earls: Estate Redistribution in Fourteenth-century England". In Bothwell, James (ed.). The Age of Edward III. Woodbridge: Boydell & Brewer. pp. 35–52. ISBN 978-1-9031-5306-2.
- Bothwell, James (2004). Edward III and the English Peerage: Royal Patronage, Social Mobility and Political Control in Fourteenth-Century England. Ipswich: Boydell Press. ISBN 1-8438-3047-7.
- Bothwell, James (2008). "The More Things Change: Isabella and Mortimer, Edward III and the Painful Delay of a Royal Majority". In Beem, C. (ed.). The Royal Minorities of Medieval and Early Modern England. New York: Palgrave Macmillan. pp. 67–102. ISBN 978-0-2306-0866-5.
- Brogan, Stephan (2015). The Royal Touch in Early Modern England: Politics, Medicine and Sin. Woodbridge: Boydell & Brewer. ISBN 978-0-8619-3337-2.
- Brown, Alfred Lawson (1989). The Governance of Late Medieval England 1272–1461. London: Edward Arnold. ISBN 0-8047-1730-3. OL 16832664M.
- Cantor, Norman F. (2002). In the Wake of the Plague: The Black Death and the World it Made. New York: HarperCollins. ISBN 978-0-0600-1434-6.
- Carpenter, Christine (1997). The Wars of the Roses: Politics and the Constitution in England, C. 1437–1509. Cambridge University Press. ISBN 978-0-5213-1874-7.
- Chaplais, Pierre (1994). Piers Gaveston: Edward II's Adoptive Brother. Oxford University Press. ISBN 978-0-1982-0449-7.
- Cheney, C. R. (1961). A Handbook of Dates: For Students of British History (4th repr. ed.). Cambridge: Royal Historical Society. OCLC 866380867.
- Cornell, D. (2008). "A Kingdom Cleared of Castles: the Role of the Castle in the Campaigns of Robert Bruce". The Scottish Historical Review. 2nd. LXXXVII (2): 233–257. doi:10.3366/E0036924108000140. OCLC 9788800317. S2CID 153554882.
- Curry, A. (2003). The Hundred Years' War. British History in Perspective (2nd ed.). Basingstoke: Macmillan. ISBN 978-1-4039-0816-2.
- Cushway, G. (2011). Edward III and the War at Sea: The English Navy, 1327–1377. Woodbridge: Boydell. ISBN 978-1-8438-3621-6. OL 25096813M.
- DeVries, Kelly (1996). Infantry Warfare in the Early Fourteenth Century: Discipline, Tactics, and Technology. Woodbridge: Boydell. ISBN 0-8511-5567-7. OL 975384M.
- Doherty, P. (2003). "The She-Wolf Triumphant". Isabella and the Strange Death of Edward II. London: Carroll & Graf. pp. 105–132. ISBN 978-0-7867-1193-2.
- Dodd, Gwilym (2019). "Languages and Law in Late Medieval England: English, French and Latin". In Barrington, Candace; Sobecki, Sebastian (eds.). The Cambridge Companion to Medieval English Law and Literature. Cambridge University Press. pp. 17–29. ISBN 978-1-1071-8078-9.
- Dudley, Leonard (2017). The Singularity of Western Innovation: The Language Nexus. New York: MacmillanPalgrave. ISBN 978-1-1373-9822-2.
- Dunham, W. H.; Wood, C. T. (1976). "The Right to Rule in England: Depositions and the Kingdom's Authority, 1327–1485". The American Historical Review. 81 (4): 738–761. doi:10.2307/1864778. JSTOR 1864778. OCLC 1830326.
- Dunn, A. (2002). The Great Rising of 1381: the Peasants' Revolt and England's Failed Revolution. Stroud, UK: Tempus. ISBN 978-0-7524-2323-4.
- Finley-Crosswhite, Annette (2003). Gosman, Martin; MacDonald, Alasdair; Vanderjagt, Arjo (eds.). Princes and Princely Culture: 1450–1650. Vol. 1. Leiden: Brill. pp. 131–146. ISBN 978-9-0041-3572-7.
- Fowler, Kenneth H. (1969). The King's Lieutenant: Henry of Grosmont, First Duke of Lancaster, 1310–1361. London: Elek. ISBN 0-2363-0812-2.
- Fritze, R. H.; Robison, William Baxter, eds. (2002). Historical Dictionary of Late Medieval England, 1272–1485. Westport: Greenwood. ISBN 978-0-3132-9124-1.
- Fryde, Edmund B. (1983). Studies in Medieval Trade and Finance. London: Hambledon Press. ISBN 978-0-9076-2810-1. OL 8294646M.
- Fryde, Natalie M. (1975). "Edward III's Removal of his Ministers and Judges, 1340–1". Bulletin of the Institute of Historical Research. 48 (118): 149–161. doi:10.1111/j.1468-2281.1975.tb00747.x.
- George, Hereford Brooke (1875). Genealogical table illustrative of Modern History. Oxford at the Clarendon Press.
- Given-Wilson, Chris (1986). The Royal Household and the King's Affinity: Service, Politics, and Finance in England, 1360–1413. New Haven: Yale University Press. ISBN 0-3000-3570-5.
- Given-Wilson, Chris (1994). "Richard II, Edward II, and the Lancastrian Inheritance". The English Historical Review. 109 (432): 553–571. doi:10.1093/ehr/cix.432.553. OCLC 2207424.
- Given-Wilson, Chris (1996). The English Nobility in the Late Middle Ages. London: Routledge. ISBN 0-4151-4883-9. OL 7484251M.
- Given-Wilson, Chris; Prestwich, Michael C. (2001). "Introduction". In Bothwell, James (ed.). The Age of Edward III. Woodbridge: Boydell Press. pp. 1–13. ISBN 978-1-9031-5306-2.
- Given-Wilson, Chris (2004). "Perrers [Other Married Name Windsor], Alice (d. 1401/02), Royal Mistress". Oxford Dictionary of National Biography (online ed.). Oxford University Press. doi:10.1093/ref:odnb/21977. ISBN 978-0-19-861412-8. (Subscription, Wikipedia Library access or UK public library membership required.)
- Given-Wilson, Chris; Brand, P.; Phillips, S.; Ormrod, M.; Martin, G.; Curry, A.; Horrox, R., eds. (2005). "Introduction: Edward III: January 1327". British History Online. Parliament Rolls of Medieval England. Woodbridge.
- Goodman, A. (1992). John of Gaunt: The Exercise of Princely Power in Fourteenth-century Europe. Longman. ISBN 978-0-5820-9813-8. OL 1459694M.
- Goodman, B. A. (2015). "Women's Wounds in Middle English Romances: An Exploration of Defilement, Disfigurement, and a Society in Disrepair". In Tracy, L.; DeVries, K. (eds.). Wounds and Wound Repair in Medieval Culture. Leiden: Brill. pp. 544–571. ISBN 978-90-04-30645-5.
- Graves, Michael A. R. (2013) [1990]. Early Tudor Parliaments 1485–1558 (repr. ed.). Abingdon: Routledge. ISBN 978-1-3179-0083-2.
- Haines, R. M. (2003). King Edward II: His life, his reign and its aftermath, 1284–1330. Montreal: McGill-Queen's University Press. ISBN 978-0-77353-157-4.
- Hamilton, B. (1995). "Eleanor of Castile and the Crusading Movement". Mediterranean Historical Review. 10 (1–2): 92–103. doi:10.1080/09518969508569686.
- Hanawalt, Barbara A. (1989). The Ties that Bound: Peasant Families in Medieval England. New York: Oxford University Press. ISBN 978-0-1950-4564-2.
- Harding, V. (2002). The Dead and the Living in Paris and London, 1500–1670. Cambridge: Cambridge University Press. ISBN 978-0-5218-1126-2.
- Harriss, G. L. (1975). King, Parliament and Public Finance in Medieval England to 1369. Oxford University Press. ISBN 978-0-1982-2435-8. OL 5255143M.
- Harriss, G. L. (2006). Shaping the Nation: England 1360–1461. Oxford University Press. ISBN 978-0-1992-1119-7. OL 9479199M.
- Hefferan, Matthew (2021). The Household Knights of Edward III: Warfare, Politics and Kingship in Fourteenth-century England. Woodbridge: Boydell & Brewer. ISBN 978-1-7832-7564-9.
- Hicks, M. (2012). The Wars of the Roses. New Haven and London: Yale University Press. ISBN 978-0-3001-8157-9.
- Holmes, George (1975). The Good Parliament. Clarendon Press. ISBN 978-0-1982-2446-4. OL 4291706M.
- Jack, R. Ian (2004). "Hastings, John, Thirteenth Earl of Pembroke (1347–1375)". Oxford Dictionary of National Biography (online ed.). Oxford University Press. doi:10.1093/ref:odnb/12580. ISBN 978-0-19-861412-8. (Subscription, Wikipedia Library access or UK public library membership required.)
- Jones, Dan (2013). The Plantagenets: The Warrior Kings and Queens Who Made England. Viking. ISBN 978-0-6700-2665-4.
- Lander, Jack Robert (1973). Ancient and Medieval England: Beginnings to 1509. New York: Harcourt Brace Jovanovich. ISBN 978-0-1553-5107-3.
- Le Baker, G. (2012). Barber, R. (ed.). The Chronicle of Geoffrey Le Baker of Swinbrook. Translated by D. Prest. Woodbridge: Boydell Press. ISBN 978-1-8438-3691-9.
- Lord, C. (2002). "Queen Isabella at the Court of France". In Given-Wilson, Chris (ed.). Fourteenth Century England. Vol. II. Woodbridge: Boydell Press. pp. 45–52. ISBN 978-0-8511-5891-4.
- Louda, Jiří; Maclagan, Michael (1981). Line of Succession: Heraldry of the Royal Families of Europe. London: Macdonald. ISBN 0-8561-3276-4.
- Maddicott, J. R. (2010). The Origins of the English Parliament, 924–1327. Oxford: Oxford University Press. ISBN 978-0-19958-550-2.
- McFarlane, K. B. (1973). The Nobility of Later Medieval England: The Ford Lectures for 1953 and Related Studies. Oxford: Clarendon Press. OCLC 43117657.
- McFarlane, K. B. (1981). England in the Fifteenth Century: Collected Essays. London: Continuum. OCLC 746470459.
- McKisack, May (1959). The Fourteenth Century 1307–1399. Oxford History of England. Vol. 5. Oxford: Clarendon Press. OL 26141653M.
- McKisack, M. (1960). "Edward III and the historians". History. 45 (153): 1–15. doi:10.1111/j.1468-229X.1960.tb02288.x. JSTOR 24403881.
- Morgan, D. A. L. (1997). "The Political After-Life of Edward III: The Apotheosis of a Warmonger". The English Historical Review. 112 (448): 856–881. doi:10.1093/EHR/CXII.448.856. OCLC 925708104.
- Morris, Marc (2009). A Great and Terrible King: Edward I and the Forging of Britain. London: Windmill Books. ISBN 978-0-0994-8175-1.
- Mortimer, Ian (2006). The Perfect King: The Life of Edward III, Father of the English Nation. London: Jonathan Cape. ISBN 0-2240-7301-X.
- Musson, Anthony; Ormrod, W. M. (1999). The Evolution of English Justice. Basingstoke: Macmillan. ISBN 0-3336-7670-X.
- Myers, A. R., ed. (1953). English Historical Documents: 1327–1485. Vol. IV (1st ed.). London: Eyre & Spottiswoode.
- Myers, A. R. (1978). English Society in the Late Middle Ages, 1066–1307 (8th ed.). Harmondsworth: Penguin. ISBN 978-0-1402-0234-2.
- Nicholson, Ranald (1965). Edward III and the Scots: The Formative Years of a Military Career, 1327–1335. Oxford Historical Series, 2nd ser. London: Oxford University Press. OCLC 1337340. OL 5935960M.
- Orme, N. (2003). Medieval Children. New Haven: Yale University Press. ISBN 978-0-30008-541-9.
- Ormrod, W. Mark (1986). "The English government and the Black Death of 1348–1349". In Ormrod, W. Mark (ed.). England in the Fourteenth Century. Woodbridge: Boydell. pp. 175–188. ISBN 0-8511-5448-4.
- Ormrod, W. M. (1987). "Edward III and His Family". Journal of British Studies. 26 (4): 398–422. doi:10.1086/385897. OCLC 48537247. S2CID 145367493.
- Ormrod, W. Mark (2000) [1990]. The Reign of Edward III (repr. ed.). Stroud: Tempus. ISBN 978-0-7524-1434-8.
- Ormrod, W. M. (2004a). "Edward III (1312–1377), King of England and Lord of Ireland, and Duke of Aquitaine". Oxford Dictionary of National Biography (online ed.). Oxford University Press. doi:10.1093/ref:odnb/8519. (Subscription, Wikipedia Library access or UK public library membership required.)
- Ormrod, W. M. (2004b). "Lionel [Lionel of Antwerp], Duke of Clarence (1338–1368), Prince". Oxford Dictionary of National Biography (online ed.). Oxford University Press. doi:10.1093/ref:odnb/16750. (Subscription, Wikipedia Library access or UK public library membership required.)
- Ormrod, W. M. (2006). "Who Was Alice Perrers?". The Chaucer Review. 40 (3): 219–229. doi:10.1353/cr.2006.0005. ISSN 0009-2002. JSTOR 25094322. S2CID 159666956.
- Ormrod, W. M. (2008). "The Trials of Alice Perrers". Speculum. 83 (2): 366–396. doi:10.1017/S0038713400013361. OCLC 35801878. S2CID 154399794.
- Ormrod, W. M. (2012). Edward III. Yale University Press. ISBN 978-0-3001-1910-7. OL 25170147M.
- Parsons, J. C. (2004). "Isabella [Isabella of France] (1295–1358)". Oxford Dictionary of National Biography. Oxford University Press. doi:10.1093/odnb/9780192683120.013.14484.
- Peters, E. (1970). The Shadow King: Rex Inutilis in Medieval Law and Literature, 751–1327. New Haven: Yale University Press. OCLC 657399253.
- Phillips, Seymour (2011). Edward II. Yale University Press. ISBN 978-0-3001-7802-9.
- Pollard, A. J. (1988). The Wars of the Roses. Basingstoke: Macmillan. ISBN 978-0-3334-0603-8.
- Powicke, M. R. (1956). "Edward II and Military Obligation". Speculum. 31 (1): 92–119. doi:10.2307/2850077. JSTOR 2850077. OCLC 709976972. S2CID 145580305.
- Prestwich, Michael C. (1980). The Three Edwards: War and State in England 1272–1377. London: Weidenfeld and Nicolson. ISBN 0-2977-7730-0.
- Prestwich, Michael C. (1983). "Parliament and the Community of the Realm in the Fourteenth Century". In Cosgrove, A.; McGuire, J. I. (eds.). Parliament & Community: Papers Read before the Irish Conference of Historians, Dublin 27–30 May 1981. Appletree Press. ISBN 978-0-9046-5193-5.
- Prestwich, Michael C. (2005). Plantagenet England: 1225–1360. Oxford University Press. ISBN 0-1982-2844-9. OL 3404029M.
- Prince, A. E. (1926). "A Letter of Edward the Black Prince Describing the Battle of Nájera in 1367". The English Historical Review. 41: 415–418. doi:10.1093/ehr/XLI.CLXIII.415. OCLC 1830326.
- Purcell, Mark (2017). The Country House Library. Yale University Press. ISBN 978-0-3002-4868-5.
- Putnam, Bertha Haven (1929). "The Transformation of the Keepers of the Peace into the Justices of the Peace 1327–1380". Transactions of the Royal Historical Society. 12: 19–48. doi:10.2307/3678675. JSTOR 3678675. S2CID 154160576.
- Raven, M. (2021). "The Earldom Endowments of 1337: Political Thought and the Practice of Kingship in Late Medieval England". English Historical Review. 136 (580): 408–529. doi:10.1093/ehr/ceab164. OCLC 925708104.
- Rodger, Nicholas A. M. (1997). The Safeguard of the Sea: A Naval History of Britain, 660–1649. London: HarperCollins. ISBN 978-0-3933-1960-6.
- Rogers, Clifford J. (2000). War Cruel and Sharp: English Strategy under Edward III, 1327–1360. Woodbridge: Boydell Press. ISBN 0-8511-5804-8.
- Rogers, C. J. (2002). "England's Greatest General". MHQ: The Quarterly Journal of Military History. 14 (4): 34–45.
- Rose, S. (1982). The Navy of the Lancastrian Kings: Accounts and Inventories of William Soper, Keeper of the King's Ships, 1422–1427. Navy Records Society. London: Allen & Unwin. ISBN 978-0-0494-2175-2.
- Ross, C. D. (1974). Edward IV. Berkeley: University of California Press. OCLC 1259845.
- Rubin, M. (2006). The Hollow Crown: The Penguin History of Britain 1272–1485. London: Penguin. ISBN 978-0-1401-4825-1.
- Rudgard, O. (27 June 2017). "It's not Just Danny Dyer who is Related to Royalty: We all are, Geneticist Says". The Telegraph. The Daily Telegraph.
- Rutherford, A. (2020). How to Argue With a Racist: History, Science, Race and Reality. New York: The Experiment. ISBN 978-1-61519-830-6.
- Sherborne, J. (1994). Tuck, A. (ed.). War, Politics and Culture in 14th Century England. London: Hambledon Press. ISBN 978-1-8528-5086-9.
- St George's Windsor (2023). "College of St George, Windsor Castle: The Order of the Garter". College of St George, Windsor Castle. Archived from the original on 15 July 2017.
- St John, L. B. (2014). "In the Best Interest of the Queen: Isabella of France, Edward II and the Image of a Functional Assembly". In Hamilton, J. S. (ed.). Fourteenth Century England VIII. Woodbridge: Boydell & Brewer. pp. 21–42. ISBN 978-1-8438-3917-0.
- Stubbs, William (1887). The Constitutional History of England in Its Origin and Development. Vol. II (3rd ed.). Oxford: Clarendon Press. OCLC 958711318.
- Sturdy, David J. (1992). "The Royal Touch in England". In Duchhardt, Heinz; Jackson, Richard A.; Sturdy, David J. (eds.). European Monarchy: Its Evolution and Practice from Roman Antiquity to Modern Times. Stuttgart: Franz Steiner Verlag. pp. 171–184. ISBN 978-3-5150-6233-6.
- Sumption, Jonathan (1999). Trial by Battle (The Hundred Years War I). London: Faber and Faber. ISBN 0-5712-0095-8.
- Tuck, A. (1985). Crown and Nobility 1272–1461: Political Conflict in Late Medieval England. London: Fontana. ISBN 0-0068-6084-2.
- Tuck, A. (2004). "Edmund [Edmund of Langley], First Duke of York (1341–1402), Prince". Oxford Dictionary of National Biography (online ed.). Oxford University Press. doi:10.1093/ref:odnb/16023. ISBN 978-0-19-861412-8. (Subscription, Wikipedia Library access or UK public library membership required.)
- Tuck, Anthony (2004b). "Thomas, duke of Gloucester (1355–1397)". Oxford Dictionary of National Biography (online ed.). Oxford University Press. doi:10.1093/ref:odnb/27197. (Subscription, Wikipedia Library access or UK public library membership required.)
- Warner, K. (2014). Edward II: The Unconventional King. Stroud: Amberley Publishing Limited. ISBN 978-1-4456-4132-4.
- Warner, K. (2016). Isabella of France: The Rebel Queen. Amberley. ISBN 9781445647418.
- Warner, K. (2022). Philippa of Hainault: Mother of the English Nation. Stroud: Amberley Publishing. ISBN 978-1-39811-089-2.
- Waugh, Scott L. (1991). England in the Reign of Edward III. Cambridge University Press. ISBN 0-5213-1090-3. OL 1850113M.
- Wedgwood, Josiah C. (1930). "John of Gaunt and the Packing of Parliament". The English Historical Review. XLV (CLXXX): 623–625. doi:10.1093/ehr/XLV.CLXXX.623. ISSN 0013-8266.
- Wilkinson, Bertie (1995). The Later Middle Ages in England 1216–1485. London: Routledge. ISBN 978-1-3178-7323-5.
- Woodacre, Elena (2013). The Queens Regnant of Navarre. Palgrave Macmillan. ISBN 9781349464319.
- Wyatt, L. (2023). Edward I's Granddaughters: Murder, Power and Plantagenets. Barnsley: Pen and Sword. ISBN 978-1-3990-0671-2.

Edward III House of Plantagenet Born: 13 November 1312 Died: 21 June 1377
Regnal titles
Preceded by Edward II	Duke of Aquitaine; 1325–1360	Treaty of Brétigny
Preceded by Edward II	Count of Ponthieu; 1325–1369	Succeeded by James
Preceded by Edward II	King of England; Lord of Ireland; 1327–1377	Succeeded by Richard II
Preceded by Edward the Black Prince	Duke of Aquitaine; 1372–1377	Succeeded by Richard II
Treaty of Brétigny	Lord of Aquitaine; 1360–1362	Edward the Black Prince
Titles in pretence
Preceded by Charles IV of France as undisputed king	— TITULAR — King of France; 1340–1360; 1369–1377; Reason for succession failure: Capetian dynastic turmoil	Succeeded by Richard II of England
