= Elasund =

Board game

The First City
- Designers: Klaus Teuber
- Publishers: Kosmos; Mayfair Games
- Players: 2 to 4
- Setup time: 5 minutes
- Playing time: 60 minutes
- Chance: Medium
- Skills: Dice rolling, tile placing

Elasund: The First City (German: Elasund - Die erste Stadt; pronounced [eːlaːˈzʊnt]) is a German-style board game designed by Klaus Teuber. It is the second game in the Catan Adventures series (the first being Candamir: The First Settlers), a series of spinoff games based on the theme from Teuber's hit game The Settlers of Catan as well as its German-language novelization by Rebecca Gablé. As a game in the Catan series, it is published by Kosmos in German and Mayfair Games in English. Despite the thematic connection between Elasund and Settlers, the two games have completely different mechanics.

== Story ==
Elasund deals with the formation of the first city on the island of Catan, as established in Settlers. It is a coastal city, named for a fictional Scandinavian location from which the novel's characters set out for Catan, founded with foreign trade in mind. In this game, players seek to score victory points by building public buildings inside the city, as well as contribute to the city's church and city walls. To build buildings, one must collect money to purchase building permits on their building sites, and possibly use their influence (in the form of influence cards) to prevent others from building on the chosen site or to build over other buildings. As the city is built, however, pirates from the sea are waiting to sack the city.

== Gameplay ==
The game is played on a board of 10 rows, with a varying number of columns based on the number of players involved. The top half of the board is numbers 2–6, while the bottom half is numbered 8–12.

Each player begins the game with two buildings: one straddling two rows (either 5 and 6 or 8 and 9), and the other on either row 4 or row 10. Other buildings are of various shapes and sizes, which are considered "neutral buildings": each neutral building is worth a certain number of points, which are spread out over different rows - as an example, the largest buildings span three rows and two columns, and are worth two victory points: one in the top row and one in the middle. Each player also begins the game with five building permits, which vary in value.

At the start of each player's turn, the players roll two dice, and each building on the specified row collects gold or influence cards, depending on the building for their owner. However, if the row where resources is collected is the same as the one in the previous turn, either the row two rows above or the row two rows below, depending on the player's choice, collects resources instead. On a roll of 7, however, pirates from the sea sack a specified row in the city, and players must discard cards corresponding to the number of victory points that they have in that row.

After resources are collected, up to two buildings may be built: buildings may be built over an area with a specified number of permits (depending on a building), of which the total value of the player's own permits at the site exceeds that of all other players. Buildings may be built over buildings of smaller size, in which the smaller buildings are removed, and may be built over other buildings of the same size if an appropriate number of influence cards are discarded. Buildings cost money to place, more if an opposing building permit is on the building site, as the value of the permit is reimbursed in gold to its owner by the builder.

A player may also contribute to the walls of the city instead of placing a building - each player may build up to nine wall segments over the course of the game, with walls along the top or bottom edge costing 2 gold while an inland wall costing 4 gold. Walls, when built, may also allow the builder to earn gold, influence cards, or victory points. A player may also contribute to the local church, which is built in nine parts. A church part may be built over any building or permit (in which the owner is not reimbursed), and may not be itself built over.

If a player's starting building is built over, they may place it in any vacant spot on the board, or removed from play if no such space exists.

A building on the coast, and certain squares inland, are worth trade points, which may contribute to victory point scoring.

After buildings are built, the player may place permits in the row where resources were collected (or any row with influence cards). Permits may be placed for an amount of gold equal to its value.

The winner is the first player to collect ten points.

== Expansions ==
A German language expansion to Elasund is available from the author's website, which adds several buildings to the game.

== Reviews ==
- Pyramid
