= Katan =

Katan, Hebrew for small, may refer to:

== People ==
- Anny Rosenberg Katan, Austrian-born child psychologist
- Yaniv Katan (born 1981), Israeli footballer
- Brother Katan

== Other ==
- Zakef katan, a Torah trope sound, anchor for Katan group
- Mo'ed Katan, Jewish holiday
- Olam katan, Jewish philosophical concept
- Tallit katan, Jewish garment
- HaMakhtesh HaKatan, Israel

== See also ==
- Catan
- Katana
