= Rebecca Gablé =

German author (born 1964)

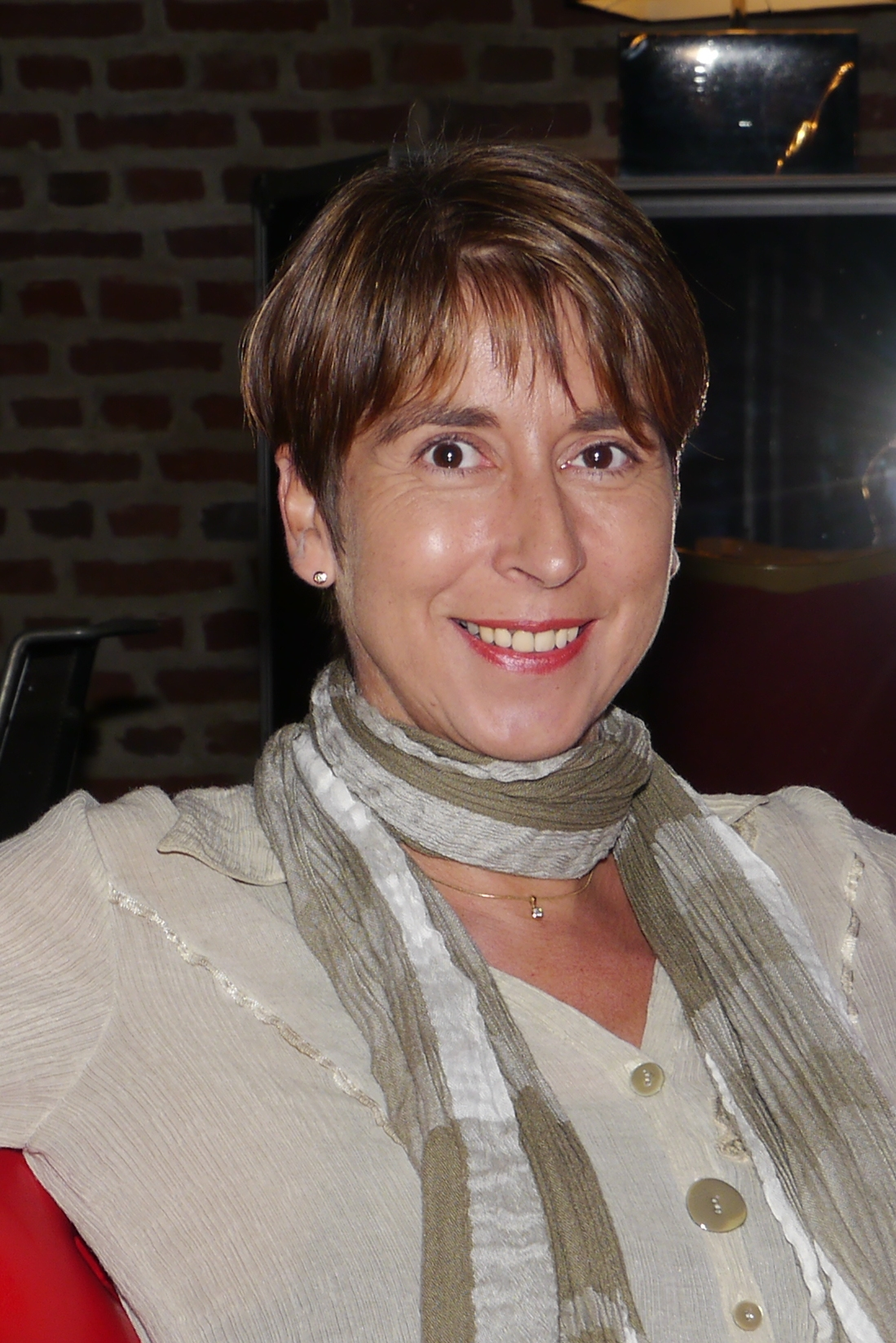
- Born: Mönchengladbach
- Occupation: Novelist
- Writing career
- Period: 1995–present
- Genre: Historical fiction
- Website: www.gable.de

Rebecca Gablé (born 25 September 1964) is a German author of historical fiction. Gablé is best known for her medieval chivalry novels. She also works as a literary translator from English. Her work includes Settlers of Catan based on the board game.

== Life ==
Gable was born in Mönchengladbach.

After, leaving school, in 1984 she embarked on a one-year apprenticeship as a trainee bank clerk. The one-year apprenticeship became four years as a bank worker. She lived close to a military base used by the British Royal Air Force. This led to an interest in English language and culture, reflected regularly in her subsequent literary output. She studied in Dusseldorf, where she worked for the Chair of Medieval English Literature.

The commercial breakthrough came in 1997 with her first historical novel "Das Lächeln der Fortuna" (The Smile of Fortuna), of which in the first year after publication about 200,000 copies were sold. From 1999 to 2000, she was a lecturer at the Heinrich Heine University Düsseldorf in Old English literature. In 2000 she published "Das zweite Königreich" (The Second Kingdom), another history novel. Since then, Gablé has turned to the writing of historical novels, all of which went up in the bestseller lists. In addition to the ongoing series about the history of the (fictional) Waringham family, which is closely linked to the English ruling houses of the Middle Ages and the early modern period, Gablé wrote other novels, which also play in the Middle Ages.

== Works ==
In English:

- Fortune's Wheel
- The Settlers of Catan, based on the board game of the same name by Klaus Teuber. The novel was the inspiration for the Catan Adventures series of games: Candamir and Elasund.

In German:

- Detective novels
  - Jagdfieber, 1995
  - Die Farben des Chamäleons, 1996
  - Das letzte Allegretto, 1998
  - Das Floriansprinzip, 1999
- Waringham series
  - Das Lächeln der Fortuna, 1997 (Fortune's Wheel)
  - Die Hüter der Rose, 2005
  - Das Spiel der Könige, 2007
  - Der dunkle Thron, 2011
  - Der Palast der Meere, 2015
  - Teufelskrone, 2019
  - Drachenbanner, 2022
- Helmsby series
  - Das Zweite Königreich, 2000
  - Hiobs Brüder, 2009
  - Rabenthron, 2025
- Otto the Great series
  - Das Haupt der Welt, 2013
  - Die fremde Königin, 2017
- Other historical novels
  - Der König der purpurnen Stadt, 2002 (with slight references to Waringham series)
- Other books
  - Von Ratlosen und Löwenherzen, 2008 (popular science book about the English Middle Ages)
