= Candamir: The First Settlers =

German board game

Candamir: The First Settlers is a German board game. It is the first game of the Catan Adventure series of games, which share a common theme (but not mechanics) with the Settlers of Catan games. As such, it was created by Klaus Teuber, and distributed by Kosmos in German and Mayfair Games in English. The name "Candamir" comes from the Settlers of Catan novel by Rebecca Gablé, where Candamir is the name of the main character. The same character is prominently featured in this game.

In this game, each of the players takes the role of a settler on the newly settled island of Catan, having lost most of their belongings in a shipwreck. The game details the adventures of these players as they settle in a nearby village. The name Candamir is said to be taken from one of the villagers. Like many designer board games Candamir is played to a certain number of victory points, which are represented in this game by markers. To win the game, a player must place all of their markers on the board.

== Gameplay ==
The game is played on a square board, to which one side contains a closeup view of the village. There, four of the village's inhabitants require goods or livestock that the players must build with their resources. The completion of each good or the gathering of livestock will grant a player one victory point, and possibly other benefits, depending on the villager.

Each player is represented by a character, which have varying amounts of inherent strength in four attributes as well as a number of special abilities. Eight character cards are provided with the game (four characters in two genders), and players are encouraged to create their own through the use of the online character creator found on the game's official website.

At the start of each turn, players may choose to explore and move towards a destination on the board, or may choose to build items for the villagers. Movement in the game is controlled by the use of a deck of movement cards, through which players may encounter natural hazards, ingredients, or adventures. If a player reaches their goal, they may obtain experience or equipment that may boost their own attributes, resources for building, or livestock that immediately grant victory points.

Players seek to collect resources, gathered from around the board, to build items for the villagers, as well as ingredients to create potions that restore their own vitality. Certain encounters may reduce the health of the player, and if the health of the player reaches zero, they are forced to skip a turn to restore their vitality. Like Settlers, Candamir allows players to trade resources, ingredients, and potions for an agreed upon price.

== Reviews ==
- Pyramid
