= List of Catan products =

Series of products based on the board game

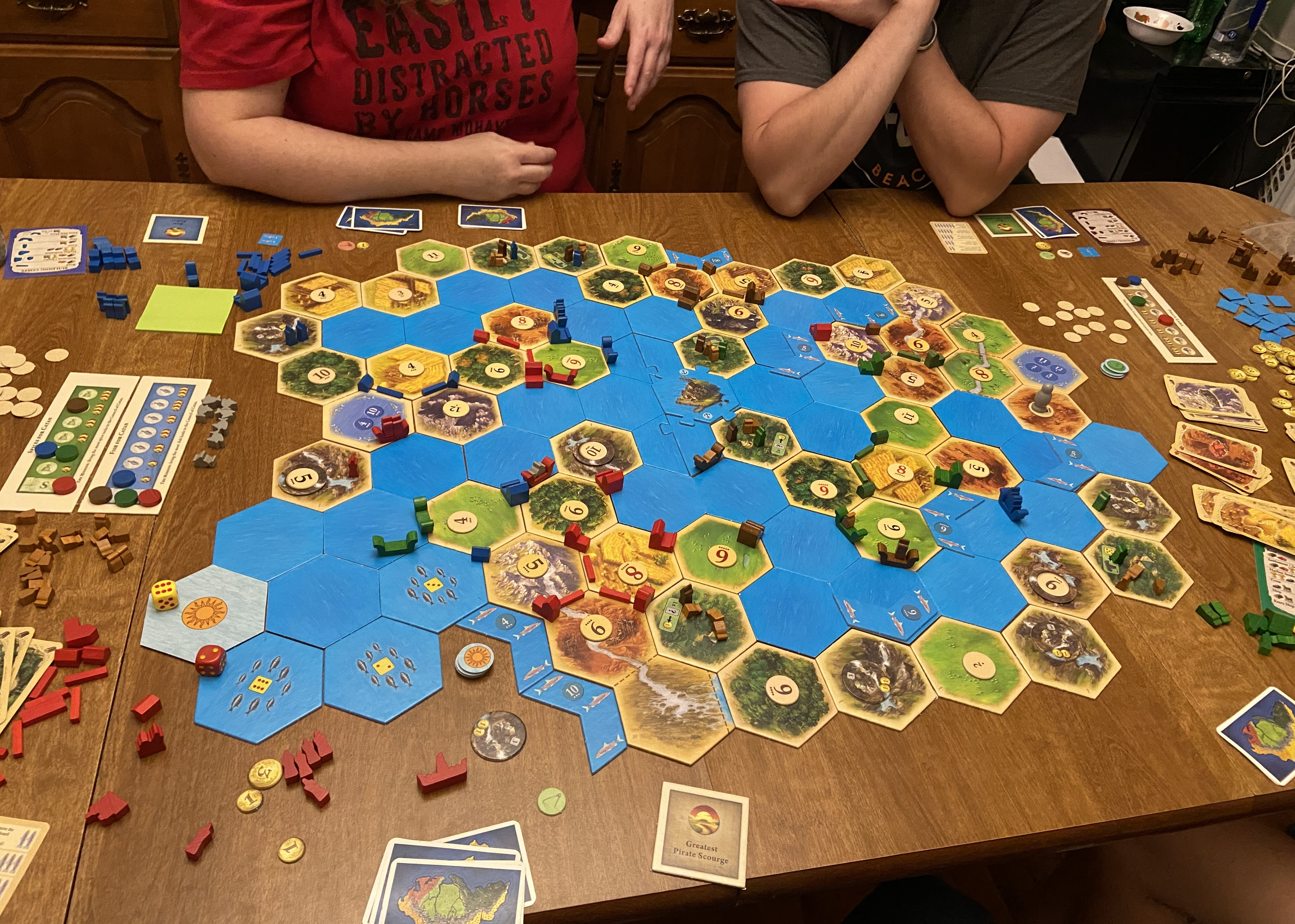
Borderless Catan set-up featuring multiple expansion packs

Catan, originally known as The Settlers of Catan, (Note: German: Die Siedler von Catan, German: [diː ˈziːdlɐ fɔn kaˈtaːn]) is a 1995 multiplayer board game designed by Klaus Teuber. It has since spawned a series of games spanning multiple media, most of which have been designed principally by Teuber.

== Expansions and Extensions ==
Published by Kosmos in 1995, The Settlers of Catan is the first of the Catan game series. The original game is expanded upon by expansions and extensions: the former adds new gameplay to Settlers, while the latter adds the ability to add two more players to the game, creating a game for six players. The 5-6 player extension of the base game itself was released in 1996. As of 2017, there are four expansions to Settlers, adding new gameplay to the core game, and each expansion has a matching extension. Gameplay for 5-6 players with expansions require the extensions for both the base game and the expansion(s) involved.

=== Catan: Seafarers ===
Introduced in 1997, Catan: Seafarers adds the element of sea travel to the basic Settlers game. The 5-6 player extension was released in 1999.

=== Catan: Cities & Knights ===
Released in 1999, Cities & Knights vastly changes the original design of the Catan rule mechanics to expand the role of the cities. It adds barbarian attacks, metropolises, a merchant, commodity production, and physical knights to the primary rules. The 5-6 player extension was released in 2000.

=== Catan: Traders & Barbarians ===
Although elements of Traders & Barbarians were available separately from 2004 to 2007, this pack was not released in English until 2008. It combines elements of fishing, events, expanded trading, barbarian attacks, camel trains, and much more to make a more well-rounded playing experience. It also includes rules for play with 2 people. The 5-6 player extension was also released in 2008.

=== Catan: Explorers & Pirates ===
Released in 2013, Catan: Explorers & Pirates features five scenarios and three missions based around exploring new lands and battling pirates. Some of the scenarios make use of the missions while others do not. The scenarios included are "Land Ho", "Pirate Lairs", "Fish for Catan", "Spices for Catan" and "Explorers & Pirates".

=== Catan: Oil Springs ===
Introduced in 2011, Catan: Oil Springs is an expansion of the basic Settlers game designed to draw attention to environmental issues. It is offered as a free download (requiring the pieces to be printed and cut out), or it can be purchased from the Mayfair Games website or in game stores. The scenario adds oil fields which can be used to make other resources or develop metropolises however disasters can strike if too much oil is used. Oil can also be sequestered (taken out of the game) in exchange for victory points and to prevent disasters. The expansion already includes parts and instructions for 5-6 players. The scenario was written by Erik Assadourian and Ty Hansen.

=== Catan: Frenemies of Catan ===
Frenemies of Catan is an expansion for Catan which rewards altruistic behavior: the giving away of resources, the connecting together of multiple players' roads, and neutralization of the Robber. Such behavior results in Favor Tokens, which can provide resource, developmental, trading, or Victory Point bonuses.

=== Catan Historical Scenarios ===
The Catan Historical Scenarios series (not to be confused with the Catan Histories series) is a series of otherwise independent board games that required parts from Settlers to play. As with Settlers itself, 5-6 player play in these scenarios required the use of the 5-6 player extensions.

==== Historical Scenarios I: Alexander & Cheops ====
The first scenario pack ever created for Settlers, Catan Historical Scenarios I: Alexander and Cheops, released in 1998, recreated the epic campaign of world conquest undertaken by Alexander the Great and also recreated the building of the Great Pyramids by Cheops. Scenarios such as this would later spawn the Catan Histories spin-off line of games.

==== Historical Scenarios II: Troy & the Great Wall ====
Catan Historical Scenarios II: Troy and Great Wall, released in 2001, allowed players to fight together against the city of Troy, made famous by the Iliad. It also contained a scenario involving the construction of the Great Wall of China.

=== Scenario Packs ===
Scenario packs for Settlers have been released on special occasions. Each of these requires the base game, and possibly extensions and expansions, to play.

==== The Settlers of Catan: The Game Book ====
Released in 2000 in Germany as Das Buch zum Spielen, this book provides around 20 different scenarios for use with the original game. An English translation of the scenarios was released in the United States as The Play Book and in the UK as The Game Book. Some of these scenarios were also re-released later in other scenario packs.

==== Atlantis: Scenarios & Variants ====
Following the success of the Game Book, Kosmos in Germany released this scenario pack in 2005 which included the event cards, an updated flood scenario named "Atlantis", as well as other smaller scenarios.

==== The Settlers of Hesse ====
Released in 2008 as the first in a continuing series of scenarios demonstrating the founding of Germany's principal states. It follows the rules of the basic game closely but settlements are established on real-life locations of Hessian cities.

==== Catan-Austria & Vienna Meets Catan ====
Released in limited supply at the 2004 Austrian Gamefest as a 20th anniversary gift. Both scenarios are based on tourism in Austria. Catan-Austria focuses on the entire state of Austria while Vienna focuses on its capital.

==== Saggsen Gaden: The Settlers of Saxony & Offensive in Chemnitz ====
Released in 2005 at the Germany Game Museum in Chemnitz, Germany. Only 1000 copies of this scenario were created. Saggsen Gaden focuses on building the state of Saxony but includes bridges and a king to complicate and intensify the game. Chemnitz attempts to recreate the founding and development of Chemnitz through the construction of historic buildings.

==== The Building of Castle Chaffenberch & Renaissance in Styria ====
Released at the Essen 2007 game fair. Chaffenberch focuses on knights' tournaments and castle building while Renaissance focuses on trade between Augsburg, Vienna, Budapest, and Venice.

==== The Gold of Ankh-Morpork & Rincewind and the Tourist ====
Scheduled for release at the Essen 2008 game fair, these scenarios are taken directly out of the universe of Terry Pratchett's Discworld. Ankh-Morpork focuses on guilds in the city of Ankh-Morpork and selectivity of trade. Rincewind introduces magic and dragons into a basic Settlers game.

==== The Settlers of the North Rhine-Westphalia ====
Released in December 2008 as the second in a continuing series of scenarios demonstrating the founding of Germany's principal states. It closely follows the rules of the basic game but settlements are established on real-life locations of cities in the North Rhine-Westphalia region.

== Licensed adaptations ==
Besides the expansions and extensions, there were various licensed adaptations of Settlers, though none are compatible with any of the expansions or extensions.

=== The Water of Life ===
Das Wasser des Lebens (The Water of Life) was produced in 1997. The game is in German, despite being produced for—and distributed by—the Scottish distillery Glen Grant as a promotional item. It was the first variation or expansion of Catan published. It is set in the Scottish highlands with related thematic changes; including stills and distilleries replacing towns and cities, and the English replacing the Robber.

=== The Communication in Catan ===
Made in 2000 for the French telecommunication company Alcatel. The game was published in English but only distributed in France.

=== Rockman.EXE Catan ===
Capcom published a line of Rockman.EXE Catan games, based on their Rockman.EXE franchise and including standard and portable versions.

=== The Settlers of Canaan ===
The Settlers of Canaan, a licensed version of Settlers of Catan with additions to fit themes from the Old Testament, was released in 2002 by Cactus Game Design.

=== The Settlers of Zarahemla ===
The Settlers of Zarahemla by Inspiration Games, was released in 2003, with additions to fit themes from the Book of Mormon.

=== Geographic Discipline Model ===
Geographic Discipline Model, published by Buckland Games in 2001, is a higher-education–themed adaptation, with competing universities seeking to build new campuses (settlements/cities), connected by research grants (roads), to obtain additional students (resources).

=== Simply Catan ===
SimplyFun, a company which produces simplified versions of board games, released Simply Catan in 2006. The game replaces individual hexes with "hex strips" for faster setup, and incorporates simplified rules for playing without development cards.

=== The Settlers of Catan: Travel Edition ===
This smaller version of Settlers was released in 2002 and is identical to the base game except for its size and static number chits. The pieces and parts are not compatible with the expansions or extensions.

=== Catan Board Game: Gallery Edition ===
Gallery Edition is an abbreviated version of Settlers released in 2008, suited for the general gaming crowd. The board hexes have been simplified somewhat, with individual hexes and number tokens being replaced by a less-modular (but still piecewise) system, and with plastic pieces replacing wooden pieces.

== Starfarers of Catan series ==
Starfarers of Catan was a reimagining of Settlers to fit a space theme. Instead of being colonists on the island of Catan, players are set in the role of space colonists from Earth mingling among alien races from the Catan star system.

=== Starfarers of Catan ===
Starfarers of Catan, released in 1999, is a science fiction spin-off set in the distant future. Instead of building roads, players maneuver colony and trade ships to establish colonies on other planets and trade routes with alien races. A 5-6 player extension was published in 2001.

=== Starship Catan ===
This game acted as a spin-off from some of the elements found in Starfarers of Catan. Two players compete as astronauts stranded in another galaxy. They have to trade and produce resources from planets, complete missions, and survive against pirates. Starship Catan produced three free printable mission packs.

Three free printable expansions are available at the Catan web site:

- Starship Catan 1st Mission: The Space Amoeba - A giant space amoeba threatens the galaxy and players compete to eradicate it.
- Starship Catan 2nd Mission: The Asteroid - A giant asteroid is threatening the planet Teldur. Help the Teldurians evacuate before it is too late.
- Starship Catan 3rd Mission: The Diplomatic Station - A new member to the Galactic Council prompts players to compete to contribute the most to the new Diplomatic Space Station.
- Starship Catan Light is a simpler, one-player variation that can be played online.

=== Catan: Starfarers ===
Catan: Starfarers, released in 2019, is a modern re-implementation of Starfarers of Catan. Catan: Starfarers is for 3 to 4 players.

Catan: Starfarers 5-6 player extension, released in 2020, allows up to two additional players to play Catan: Starfarers. Adds purple and green player pieces, and The Travelers alien civilization.

== Catan Adventures ==
The Catan Adventures line of board games are thematically similar to Settlers but use different mechanics. Here, players take on the roles of individual colonists on the island of Catan.

=== Candamir: The First Settlers ===
Candamir: The First Settlers was released in 2004 and is an adventure board game set around the first settlement of Catan. Players control individual settlers hunting and gathering, with characteristics affecting success.

=== Elasund: The First City ===
Elasund: The First City, released in 2006, features construction within a single city, with game mechanics based on real estate pricing and eminent domain. A free printable expansion is available at the Catan web site.

== Catan Histories ==
The Catan Histories brand was created in 2006, with the release of its second game, Struggle for Rome and was then retroactively applied to Settlers of the Stone Age, previously published in 2002. These games, like the Catan historical scenarios before them, are games where the Settlers game mechanics were applied to historical contexts. Unlike the historical scenarios, however, these games are fully independent, and do not rely on any parts from Settlers itself.

=== Settlers of the Stone Age ===
Settlers of the Stone Age was released in 2002 and is set in the Stone Age.

=== Struggle for Rome ===
Struggle for Rome was released in 2006 and set at the fall of the Roman Empire. A free printable expansion, titled Struggle for Rome: Terror of the Legions, is available at the Catan web site.

=== Settlers of America: Trails to Rails ===
Settlers of America: Trails to Rails was released in 2010 and is set in the 19th century United States as settlers expanded into the west, first by wagon and later by train, and built cities.

=== Merchants of Europe ===
Merchants of Europe was released in 2012 and features late Middle Ages Europe as a setting. Gameplay includes the strategic setting up (and protection) of trading posts, trade routes and caravans. The rules are mostly the same as in Settlers of America.

=== Rise of the Inkas ===
Catan - Rise of the Inkas was released in 2018 and features the rise and decline of civilizations in a region of coastal and mountain Peru, across three historic eras. This is a stand-alone game. A small expansion pack called 'High Priests of the Inkas' was also released in 2018. This set has 5 Priests who each offer a particular advantage described on the card.

=== Dawn of Humankind ===
Catan - Dawn of Humankind is a 2022 pre-order, it is a modern re-implementation of Settlers of the Stone Age.

== Catan: New Energies ==
Catan: New Energies was released in 2024 as a standalone game, reimagining the world of Catan in the modern era. Gameplay focuses on managing varying energy sources and environmental effects.

== Card Games ==
=== Catan Card Game ===
Originally released in 1996, on the heels of the board game, this card game attempts to act as a two-player version of the original game, while adding elements that were not possible in the original game. The Catan Card Game has nine expansion packs:

- The Tournament Set - Released in 1997 as an additional component to the base game, this tournament set provides additional cards for a single player as well as tournament rules. All of the cards were later released in the five 1999 expansions and the rules were released in the Catan Card Game Expansions set in 2002.
- Trade & Change - Released in 1999 and included in the Catan Card Game Expansions pack, this expansion focuses on enhancing trading and resource development, while decreasing the importance of knights.
- Politics & Intrigue - Released in 1999 and included in the Catan Card Game Expansions pack, this expansion focuses on the interplay between the church, the state, and the military.
- Knights & Merchants - Released in 1999 and included in the Catan Card Game Expansions pack, this expansion focuses on the military and its increasing involvement in the world of Catan. It also includes piracy into the game.
- Science & Progress - Released in 1999 and included in the Catan Card Game Expansions pack, this expansion focuses on progressing beyond the original game and into higher technological inventions and increasing the education of Catanians.
- Wizards & Dragons - Released in 1999 and included in the Catan Card Game Expansions pack, this expansion focuses on witchcraft, wizards, dragons, and magic.
- Gold & Pirates - Released as a promotional 10-card pack at the 2002 GameFair in the Netherlands, this little expansion focuses on the role of pirates in Catan and also expands the functions of gold. It is advertised as a supplement to Trade & Change.
- Barbarians & Traders - Released in 2003 and included in the second version of the Catan Card Game Expansions pack or as a stand-alone expansion, this expansion focuses on the influence and chaos of barbarians attacks on Catan, as well as the increased influence of traders brought in from foreign lands.
- Artisans & Benefactors - Released in 2004 and available in English only as a standalone set, this expansion focuses on great works and the happiness of the people of Catan. Although the German version is called Künstler & Wohltäter (Artists and Benefactors), and although the English Catan Online World calls this expansion Artists and Benefactors, Mayfair Games chose to release the expansion as Artisans & Benefactors, which is phonetically similar to Artists in English (although the German Handwerker is clearly unrelated to Künstler).

=== The Rivals for Catan ===
Released in 2010, Rivals is an updated version of the original Catan Card Game. Its mechanics are essentially the same as the original, but its rules have been revised to make the game easier and more enjoyable for beginners. Rivals actually is several games in one: the Introductory Game; three Theme Games (The Era of Turmoil, The Era of Progress, and The Era of Gold); Duel of the Princes, which uses all three sets of themed cards; and Tournament Play, which uses custom decks of cards.

Two expansion packs for Rivals have been released:

- Age of Darkness - Released in 2011, this expansion contains three sets of cards: The Era of Intrigue, The Era of Merchant Princes!, and The Era of Barbarians.
- Age of Enlightenment - Released in 2012, this expansion contains three sets of cards: The Era of Explorers, The Era of Sages, and The Era of Prosperity.

== Other Catan spinoffs ==
Beyond Settlers and the aforementioned Catan franchises, the Catan name has also spread to various board games, also designed by Teuber.

=== The Settlers of Nuremberg ===
Released in 1999 to celebrate the 950th anniversary of the city, Die Siedler von Nürnberg is a stand-alone board game set in Nuremberg. It differs from the original game in several respects. Instead of dice, there is a deck of cards with numbers and events on them; roads are pre-established; instead of cities, players build workshops inside the city to produce goods for sale.

=== The Kids of Catan ===
The Kids of Catan is a children's game played on a revolving board, published in 2003.

=== Settlers of Catan Junior ===
Settlers of Catan Junior was announced at the 2007 Nuremberg toy fair. This version has a board that is much smaller and has two sides: one for two-players and one for 3 or 4-players. The game play is shortened to about 30 minutes. Players used resources to build pirate lairs and pirate ships.

=== De Kolonisten van de Lage Landen ===
Released in 2009, this version of catan depicts both the Netherlands and the Flanders which is the dutch speaking part of Belgium. In this version the players build governments and monuments across the two countries, also being able to trade fish for certain rewards. The game can be played by up to 5 players but if less than 4 players play the Flanders part of the board is unused.

=== Catan: Paper & Pencil ===
This Catan spin-off was originally released as a promotional on boxes of pizza from Hallo Pizza in Germany. It was later released freely on Catan's German website.

=== Catan Dice Game ===
This faster adaptation of the base game plays similar to Yahtzee. Players roll dice and try to gain the right resource combination to build the next building or road in their path. The game takes around 15 minutes to play and can be played solo.

=== Star Trek Catan ===
Released in 2012, Star Trek Catan is a licensed adaptation of the original Star Trek series to the Catan board game.

=== Ancient Egypt Catan ===
Released in 2014 as a collectors edition.

=== A Game of Thrones Catan: Brotherhood of the Watch ===
Released in 2017, A Game of Thrones Catan: Brotherhood of the Watch

== Other media ==
A novel set on the island of Catan, Die Siedler von Catan: ein Roman by Rebecca Gablé (ISBN ) was published in 2003. An English translation was published in 2011.
