= The Settlers of Zarahemla =

Licensed adaptation of Catan

- Publishers: Überplay under the Inspiration Games imprint
- Publication: 2003
- Genres: Board game
- Players: 2–4
- Playing time: 1–2 hours
- Chance: Low to medium
- Age range: 12+
- Skills: Negotiation; Strategy

The Settlers of Zarahemla is a 2003 licensed adaptation of the German board game Catan by Klaus Teuber and published by Überplay under the Inspiration Games imprint. The game is based on the Book of Mormon. Gameplay in Zarahemla is nearly identical to the original, with several major differences - most notably, the game has been modified to suit two-player play as part of its official rules.

== Equipment ==
Like Catan, Zarahemla uses a somewhat modular board structure, but instead of individual hexes (as is the case of Catan), Zarahemla uses five strips of hexes - one five-hex strip, two four-hex strips, and three-hex strips, which could be oriented and rearranged as in the standard game. These strips of hexes are double–sided. Unlike Catan, however, Zarahemla's hexes are placed on a fixed board, which itself contains the game's harbours, or trading posts. The board also contains a scoring track, which aids in keeping scores for the players.

A mini expansion of two cards was released for the game in 2003 including the "King Noah's Tax" (all players must give you one resource of their choosing) and "Escape from Bondage" (each player receives one resource of their choosing) cards. The mini expansion was originally available by submitting the email addresses of friends who might be interested in buying The Settlers of Zarahemla to either Überplay or Inspiration Games; the cards would then be sent by mail. Due to the cessation of operations of Überplay in 2008, the offer is no longer available and the cards have become difficult to find.

== Gameplay ==
Comparison of Terms in Catan and Zarahemla
Settlers of Catan	Settlers of Zarahemla
Brick	Brick
Harbour	Trading Post
Lumber	Wood
Monopoly	Prosperity
Ore	Stone
Robber	Gadianton Robber
Knight/Soldier	Stripling Warrior
Grain	Wheat
Wool	Water
Year of Plenty	Bountiful Harvest

As Zarahemla's gameplay is nearly identical to that of Catan, the rules of Catan should also be consulted for gameplay information.

Preparation in Zarahemla is identical to that of Catan, except that, for the two-player game, three settlements and roads are placed instead of two.

As in the later expansions of Catan, players are permitted to trade and build in any order. Like The Settlers of Canaan, another licensed adaptation of Catan, and the Cheops expansion to Catan, players may also contribute a stone to the Temple of Zarahemla for the price of one brick and one stone. The player with the greatest contribution (of at least three stones) to the Temple receives two victory points, which are given out akin to the Largest Army or the Longest Trade Route in Catan. Each player begins the game with ten Temple Stones.

There are two additional types of Development Cards used in Zarahemla - Temple Building allows two temple stones to be placed for free, while Liahona acts in a manner similar to the Alchemist Progress Card from Cities and Knights of Catan.

Zarahemla is played to twelve Victory Points, unlike the ten of Catan.

== Reviews ==
In a review of the game published on RPGnet in 2004, Shannon Appelcline said of the two player system;

Zarahemla is a rare Catan game that proclaims it works with two players. I decided to playtest it to see if that was true. Generally, the answer was that it worked OK, though not as good as the 3- or 4-player game. The 2-player game slows down a bit, because there's more often a total absence of a specific resource. Likewise, trading is a bit restricted. However, it did work, and I may well play a Catan game with two players again, using the fast setup suggested here (three settlements and roads instead of two).
