= Catan Historical Scenarios II: Troy and Great Wall =

Settlers of Catan expansion

Catan Historical Scenarios II: Troy and Great Wall (German: Die Siedler von Catan Historische Szenarien II: Troja & Die Große Mauer) is the second Historical Scenario expansion to the Settlers of Catan game, released in 2001 by Kosmos, though other distributors have redistributed this with a rules translation (such as the English-language Mayfair Games). Both scenarios are designed for four or six players; six-player play requires the Settlers 5-6 player extension.

The Historical Scenarios were expansions in the sense that parts from Settlers were required to complete the game equipment pieces - otherwise, it was an entirely self-contained game where the Settlers game mechanics were applied to historical situations; the historical scenarios were, to some extent, the precursors to the Catan Histories series of games. Like Settlers itself, the game was played to a certain number of victory points, though each scenario had a fixed board and had unique mechanics all its own.

== Troy ==
In Troy, players play on a hex map of the area near Greece and Troy during the Trojan War. At the start of the game, each player draws a Decision Card at random, which is to be kept secret. The Decision Card determines whether they will assist Greece or Troy in their endeavor to win the war.

During a player's turn, in addition to trading and expanding as per the base game, they may attempt to put up to three resources face down into a "support row". Each donation will earn the player one trade token. When the support row grows to a sufficient size, a battle occurs. Of the five resources in the game, two award points to Greece while two others award points to Troy (the fifth resource does not contribute to either side). The side with the plurality of the resources wins the battle, and one victory point is awarded to the backers of the winning side (if the battle is a draw, no points are awarded). Victories awarded to Greece and Troy are kept on a scoring track on the board - players do not disclose which side they back until the end of the game.

Trade tokens may be used to build ships (which, unlike Catan: Seafarers are not road extensions out to sea, but instead are played in the middle of hexes). Each ship may be deployed from a coastal settlement or city, and give the player certain advantages, such as immediately awarding victory points, or allowing the player to take or replace cards from the support row once per turn. However, every time a ship is built or a 7 is rolled, a pirate is moved. The pirate, like the robber, may take resources from the owner of a coastal settlement or ship that is located at its new destination. If the pirate is moved to a space with a ship, the ship's owner may no longer use the privilege granted by the ship.

The game ends when any player has 15 victory points, or is leading when either Greece or Troy wins six battles. Trade tokens are used to resolve ties in victory points.

== Great Wall ==
In Great Wall, each player takes the role of a Chinese general attempting to strengthen the Great Wall of China from Hun invasion. At the start of each game, players take one of the locations along the wall, as well as build their initial settlements (so that each player starts with three settlements).

During a player's turn, they may choose to expand as normal, but can also improve their section along the wall in an attempt to repel Hun invasion. Every time a settlement is built or upgraded, a Hun token is placed and deployed to a specified "assembly hex" on the token. On a subsequent turn, whenever the dice are rolled, Huns may be moved from assembly hexes to attack hexes, which run along the wall (though no attack hex may have more than 5 Huns). Each of the attack hexes border a player's section of the wall - whenever there are more Huns than the relative strength of the wall (i.e. number of wall improvements built), the Great Wall is breached.

Whenever the Great Wall is breached, the Hun tokens are placed in the Chinese interior hexes, which no longer produce resources. The player responsible for the breach is given one Minus token (penalizing the player one victory point), and one wall improvement is removed. The Great Wall may be breached multiple times at the same location.

Although there is no robber, there is a pirate in Great Wall, which merely disables the use of harbors along the coast. However, the player moving the pirate may take a card from any player. Whenever a Knight card is played, the player may choose to take two Knight actions, which include removing Hun chips in the Chinese interior, moving Huns between assembly hexes, or moving the pirate.

The game ends whenever one player reaches 10 victory points, although the players can lose as a group by allowing too many breaches and exhausting the supply of Minus tokens.
