= The Rivals for Catan =

Card game

The Rivals for Catan (German: Die Fürsten von Catan) is an updated revision of the Catan Card Game, a card game adaptation of The Settlers of Catan. The game was released in 2010. It is a member of the Catan series of games, and is published by Kosmos in German and Mayfair Games in English. Like its predecessor, The Rivals for Catan is a two-player game. As with the Catan Adventures series of games, the theme is based on the Rebecca Gablé novel The Settlers of Catan, a novel based on the original board game.

The development of The Rivals for Catan and its evolution from the Catan Card Game was documented on the official Catanism blog in eight parts, titled "The Reform of the Catan Card Game". There are a few minor changes to the rules between the two editions. The two editions are not compatible with each other, but they share many cards in common. The changes were motivated by the escalating complexity of the rules in the Catan Card Game (which had, in 2003, undergone a major rules revision) in order to make the game more accessible.

Cards in The Rivals for Catan are organized into "Theme Sets", which broadly follow the progression of time on Catan. Included with the base game are three theme sets, "The Era of Gold", "The Era of Turmoil", and "The Era of Progress", with each expansion of The Rivals of Catan containing additional theme sets. The Rivals of Catan supports three (four with expansions) different rulesets, called the Introductory (no theme sets), Theme Deck (all cards from one theme set), Duel of the Princes (parts of all theme sets), and Tournament (custom deck) games.

In 2011 an expansion called "Age of Darkness" (German: "Dunkle Zeiten") with the theme sets "The Era of Intrigue", "The Era of Merchants Princes", and "The Era of Barbarians" was released. This expansion contains new card types: Region Expansions, Extraordinary Sites, Road Complements, a new center card and Marker cards. Furthermore, there are now cards which can be placed in the opponent's principality.

For 2012 a second expansion, "Age of Enlightenment" (German: "Goldene Zeiten") was released. This 125-card expansion includes three theme sets: "The Era of Explorers", "The Era of Sages", and "The Era of Prosperity".

== Gameplay ==
Each player controls a principality of Catan, initially consisting of two settlements, a road between them, and six regions near the settlements, all of which are represented by cards. Throughout the game, players seek to expand their principality, scoring victory points for various features. Throughout the game, both principalities are kept separate from each other.

At the start of each turn, two different dice are rolled: a production die determines which regions produce resources for the players, and an event die which may cause resource bonuses or losses for one or both players, or a card to be drawn from a special deck of Event Cards. Players may then play cards from their hand, and draw cards up to their hand limit to end their turn.

Cards are broadly divided into two types: action cards and improvements. Action cards do not cost anything to play, though they may have other requirements that must be satisfied before they can be played. After they are played, action cards are discarded. Most improvements cost resources to play, but have a lasting effect on the game. Resources are kept in the regions themselves, and each region may store up to three of the resource they produce; if it subsequently produces more resources, any excess are lost. Resources may be spent from any regions that contain them.

Improvements are further broadly divided into Settlement Expansions and City Expansions, which require them to be placed above or below a settlement or city (an upgrade of a settlement). Both are also divided into Buildings and Units, and units are further subdivided into Heroes and Ships. All these may grant victory points, as well as strength points, skill points, progress points, and commerce points, which all provide various benefits. Cards are built in each player's principality during their turn. These cards are Buildings or Units - and they help the player win the game by giving them points and special abilities. For example, a Large Festival Hall card's only use is its two victory points, which is a tremendous boost to victory. An abbey, however, gives a progress point. Even better, cards like the Mint give you points - in this case a victory point - and a special effect. (The Mint allows you to trade Gold for any one other resource once a turn.)

The game ends when one player has the requisite number of points at the end of his turn: either 7 points with the introductory game, 12 points in the Theme game, 13 points in the Duel of the Princes game or 15 points in the Tournament game.
