= Catan (2009 video game) =

- Developer: Exozet Games
- Publisher: United Soft Media
- Platforms: iOS, Android, Windows Mobile
- Release: iPhone; October 23, 2009 iPad; September 29, 2010; Android; July 1, 2011; Windows Mobile; December 13, 2013
- Genre: Board game
- Mode: Turn-based strategy

Catan was a turn-based strategy video game based on Klaus Teuber's The Settlers of Catan, developed by Exozet Games and published by United Soft Media for iOS in 2009-2010, for Android in 2011, and for Windows Mobile in 2013.

== Reception ==
Reception

Aggregate score
Aggregator	Score
Metacritic	73/100

Review scores
Publication	Score
IGN	7.5/10
MacLife	2/5 stars
Pocket Gamer	(iOS) (Android)
TouchArcade	4/5 stars

The iOS version received "mixed or average reviews" according to the review aggregation website Metacritic.
