= Catan Card Game =

Card game based on the Catan board game

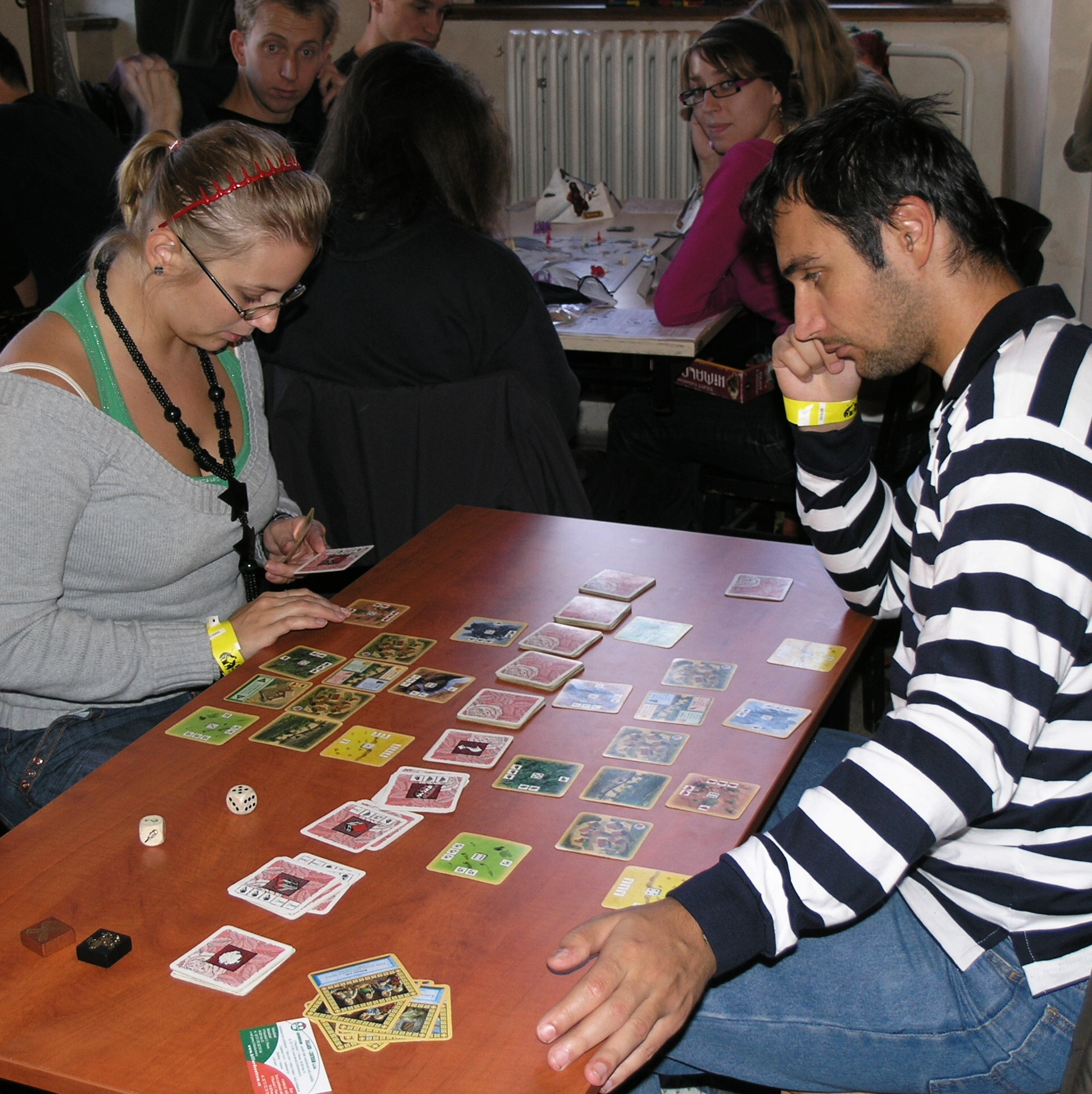
Two people playing the Catan Card Game

The Catan Card Game, originally named The Settlers of Catan: The Card Game, is a card-game adaptation of The Settlers of Catan board game. It is a member of the Catan series of games developed by Klaus Teuber and published by Kosmos in German, and by Mayfair Games in English. The Catan Card Game is a two-player game, although the rules can be accommodated as to allow players to share a set or for each player to have their own, as is intended for tournament play. Seven expansions of the Catan Card Game have also been released.

In the Catan Card Game, each player controls a principality of Catan, consisting of two settlements, a road between them, and six regions near the settlements, all of which are represented by cards. Throughout the game, players seek to expand their principalities, scoring victory points for certain features. In the course of the game the two principalities are kept separate.

Chance and luck play a lesser role in winning the card game than they do in the board game, especially when each player uses a separate copy.

== Gameplay ==
At the start of the game, each player takes a set of principality cards. Each principality begins with two settlements and a road between them. At the diagonals to the settlements lie a total of six resource fields (one in each of the traditional five Catan resources: brick, grain, lumber, ore, wool, and a sixth, gold), the two in the middle being shared by the two settlements. Resource fields both produce resources, based on the outcome of the roll of one die, as well as store them, based on the orientation of the card itself. Each resource field may hold up to three of a particular resource, and the game begins with each resource field holding one. The game also contains a limited supply of cards representing roads, settlements, cities, and resource fields, to be used as players expand their principalities; these are placed between the players. In addition, there are five draw piles in the game containing the game's remaining cards; each player, at the start of the game, draws three cards from a draw pile to use as their starting hands.

At the start of each turn, a standard die and a special event die is rolled, after which both players respond to the outcome of the event die and collect resources based on the roll of the standard die. The resource die may cause players to gain a resource bonus, lose resources, or draw and resolve a card from a special event card pile. After this, the player on move may trade resources with their opponent, or with the bank at a ratio of three-to-one, build to expand their settlement, or play cards from their hand.

In building, players use resources to build roads, which are played to the left and right of settlements, improvements, which are played above and below settlements, or additional settlements, which are played next to roads. When paying resources, resources may be taken from any combination of resource fields. If a player builds a new settlement, they also gain the use of two new resource fields, as settlements must always border four resource fields at their diagonals. New regions begin with no resources stored on them. Settlements may also be upgraded to cities, which permit a second improvement above and below the city.

=== Improvements ===
Improvements are cards that are held in your hand, and are placed above and below the settlements when they are built. Settlements permit one improvement above and below the settlement itself, while cities permit two. Certain improvements, termed "city expansions", may only be built on cities. Improvements typically earn the player commerce points or provide a benefit to the cities and resource fields adjacent to them. Certain improvements may also require the presence of other improvements as a prerequisite for building.

=== Units ===
Units are special types of improvements. There are two types of units: trade fleets, which allow beneficial trading rates, as well as knights. Each knight provides a strength value and a tournament value. The player with the greatest combined strength value will earn one victory point, while the player with the greatest tournament value will win a free resource if the event die shows "tournament" at the start of their turn.

=== Action cards ===
Action cards are another type of card that is held in their hand. Action cards are immediately resolved when played. Action cards are divided into three categories: attack, neutral, and defense. Defense action cards may be played at any time, while attack and neutral action cards may not be played unless the combined victory point total of both players is at least seven points.

=== End of turn ===
At the end of a turn, players replenish their hands up to their hand limit (or, if already at their hand limit, exchange one card in their hand for a new one); players begin with a limit of three cards, but this may be expanded with certain improvements. When drawing a new card, players may choose to take the top card from any draw pile, or pay two resources to look through any one draw pile and take the card they need.

== Scoring ==
Each settlement scores one point for their player, while cities score two. Some improvements may also award victory points. The player with the most commerce points, provided that they have a city, is said to have the trade advantage, which is worth one victory point, while the player whose knights have the greatest strength also earns one victory point (if there is a tie in the latter two, neither player wins the associated victory points). The first player to reach 10 victory points is the winner.

== Playing with expansions ==
There are seven expansions of the Catan Card Game. If both players are sharing one copy of the game, then the expansions are incompatible with each other; this is known as the "expanded game". However, if both players have separate copies of the game, then players may freely mix cards from different expansions under the "tournament rules". Both are played similar to the base game, except for the following:

- In the expanded game, there are six draw piles: four from the base game and two from the expansion. The expanded game also allows players to voluntarily remove their own improvements. Some cards are also limited to one per player in the expanded game: in this case, these cards are removed from the deck and placed between the players, and are returned to this area instead of a deck if they are removed from a principality.
- In the tournament game, players may choose their own deck of 33 cards, three of which may be designated as their starting hand and the remaining forming four draw piles. Though the decks and starting principalities are separate, players share a common supply of settlements, roads, and resource fields, and contribute to building to the event deck from their respective copies. Furthermore, certain types of cards, when played, prevent the opponent from playing an identical card.

Each expansion adds new event cards as well as new cards to be placed in the deck. The seven expansions are as follows:

=== Trade and Change ===
Trade and Change introduces road improvements, which are played on top of roads, and region improvements, which may be played above or below a resource field (depending on which side of the principality the resource field is in). Each region may only have one region improvement, and region improvements may or may not have a restriction on which resource field they may be played on. Trade also introduces foreign cards, which are improvements that are to be played in the opposing principality; these may not be voluntarily removed in the expanded game, though there is generally a way for an opponent to remove foreign cards from their principality.

The Trade and Change expanded game limits players to one Counting House (one card is from the base set, the other from the expansion).

=== Politics and Intrigue ===
Politics and Intrigue introduces the metropolis, which is a free upgrade to a city, though players may only build one metropolis. Metropolis cards are placed between the players. A metropolis allows units to be deployed as region improvements in the four adjacent regions to the metropolis. Any such units are considered to be part of the metropolis, and metropolises continue to have the benefits of a city. The metropolis is not worth any additional victory points.

The Politics and Intrigue expanded game limits players to one Town Hall and one Church (all four cards are from the base set).

=== Knights and Merchants ===
Knights and Merchants introduces the pirate fleet, which destroys an opponent's trade or pirate fleet when it is played, as well as give extra resources when the "Year of Plenty" is rolled on the event die.

Knights and Merchants also introduces cards which are only used in the tournament rules, and are omitted from the expanded game.

=== Science and Progress ===
Science and Progress introduces the cannon, a unit that contributes to strength but not to tournament ratings.

The Science and Progress expanded game limits players to one University (from the expansion).

=== Wizards and Dragons ===
Wizards and Dragons introduces an alternate upgrade to settlements called citadels, which, like cities, allow two improvements to be played above and below the citadel. However, citadels may not to be built next to each other: there must be a settlement or city between citadels. Citadels are placed between the players at the start of the game. Citadels allow wizards, a type of region improvement, to be played. Citadels are worth one victory point if there are no wizards in the adjacent regions, but two if there are.

Wizards also introduces a new pseudo-resource, magic, into the game. Unlike resources, magic cannot be traded. Magic is stored by the wizards, and is earned by converting the resources stored in the wizard's underlying resource field. Each wizard, when deployed, begins with two magic. Like resource fields, magic may be paid from any combination of wizards.

Furthermore, Wizards also introduces citadel expansions, which may only be played on citadels, as well as magic spells and magic action cards: citadel expansions and action cards, respectively, whose effects require magic to activate. Magic spells can be activated once per turn. Wizards also includes new units in dragons, which, like cannons, provide strength but no tournament rating.

=== Barbarians and Traders ===
Barbarians and Traders introduces two new types of fleets as well as a unit which earns resources when "Tournament" appears on the event die. Barbarians also adds a new wizard which may be deployed only in resource fields of types in which the opponent has a wizard deployed; in exchange, the wizard begins with no magic. As expansions are incompatible with other expansions in the expanded game, these wizard cards are removed from the deck in the expanded game.

The Barbarians and Traders expanded game limits players to one "Harbour" and one "Triumphal Arch" (one copy of each is in the base game, one in the expansion).

=== Artisans and Benefactors ===
Artisans and Benefactors introduces the concept of public feeling. Public feeling is an "abstract development card". In the expanded game, each player begins with one public feeling card already deployed; in the tournament game, players may select them as part of their decks, and do not cost anything to deploy. Public feeling cards are deployed similar to region improvements, though they are not region improvements themselves; if a region improvement is played, the public feeling card may be moved to a different region without cost (in essence, once deployed they may not be removed).

Public feeling cards also store stars. Stars, like magic, are not resources (and thus are not tradeable), but are used in a manner similar to resources. If a player has more than one public feeling card in their principality, they may freely distribute received stars between both cards. Stars can only be gained by the effects of other cards or events.

The Artisans and Benefactors expanded game limits players to one public feeling card, as well as one "Aqueduct" (from the base set) and one "House of the Benefactor" (from the expansion).

== 2010 Update ==
The Rivals for Catan (German: Die Fürsten von Catan) is an updated revision of the Catan Card Game released in 2010.

The development of The Rivals for Catan and its evolution from the Catan Card Game was documented on the official Catanism blog in eight parts, titled "The Reform of the Catan Card Game". There are a few minor changes to the rules between the two editions. The two editions are not compatible with each other, but they share many cards in common. The changes were motivated by the escalating complexity of the rules in the Catan Card Game (which had, in 2003, undergone a major rules revision) in order to make the game more accessible.
