= Catan: Traders & Barbarians =

Board game expansion

Catan: Traders & Barbarians is the third expansion to the Settlers of Catan games, developed by Klaus Teuber. It contains a series of new scenarios and small variations, which are meant for two, three, or four players (though, like other expansions, an extension for up to six players is available), with limited compatibility between the other two expansions, Catan: Seafarers and Catan: Cities & Knights. Three of the modules had been previously offered as "mini-expansions", though two have new rules in Traders. The expansion itself is named for one of the scenarios therein.

The scenarios can be combined with each other and with the other expansions only using rules available at catan.com. Some of these rules are listed here, however, technical rules involving the setup are not.

== Traders and Barbarians ==
Traders & Barbarians is the flagship scenario for the Traders expansion. In this expansion, each player has a caravan that serves to shuttle commodities between three different trade hexes. These trade hexes, all situated on a coast, have a central point and four possible road paths leading to them (building settlements on the central point or on the coastal portion of trade hexes is forbidden).

Each player is also given a wagon, which has a limited number of movement points each turn (this number can be increased by 2 by paying one grain or 2 fish but cannot be increased further). Wagons move on the intersections of hexes, and the movement costs vary depending on the presence of a road on the path, the owner of the said road if it exists, and the presence of a barbarian on the path. The movement point costs are:

- 1 movement point to use your own road, bridge, or ship
- 1 movement point and 1 gold to the owner to use an opponent's road or ship
- 1 movement point and 2 gold to the owner to use an opponent's bridge
- 2 movement points when there is no road or ship, or when there is a road broken by the Earthquake event in the Catan Event Cards variation
- 3 movement points to cross a river without a bridge
- 2 additional movement points if there is a barbarian on the path

Whenever an empty wagon arrives at a trade hex's central point, a commodity tile from the trade hex is drawn, which is to be carted off to another trade hex - each trade hex supplies and demands two different commodities. A successful delivery earns the player one victory point as well as some amount of gold.

Wagons can be upgraded to different levels (akin to development in Cities & Knights), represented by a players' Baggage Train. Increased levels increase the amount of gold earned per delivery, the number of movement points given per turn, as well as a chance to drive off barbarians (i.e. force barbarians to relocate before continuing with movement). Upgrading to the highest level earns the player one victory point.

At the start of the game, three barbarians are placed on the board. Barbarians occupy paths, and a road may not be built on paths occupied by barbarians. However, they may be driven off by wagons, and (as there is no robber in this scenario) may be moved on a roll of 7 to another path (if there is a road, the player may steal a resource from the road's owner).

In addition as a way of payment on opponents' roads, gold may be used in the same way as The Rivers, except that there are no wealthiest/poor settler tiles.

When combined with Barbarian Attack, barbarians go on one side of the road, so that they are both on a road (affecting the rules of this scenario) and a hex (affecting the rules of Barbarian Attack). It is possible to remove them using knights, and they can be moved using the wagons or certain Barbarian Attack development cards. In this case, hexes, settlements, and cities in the center of the board can also be conquered, but the barbarians always start on coastal hexes.

When combined with Cities & Knights, active knights can be used to move a barbarian from a path, which deactivates the knight.

== Barbarian Attack ==
Barbarian Attack is a scenario in which coastal tiles can be disabled through the use of barbarians. However, barbarians may be repelled by the use of knights, which are deployed at a special castle hex.

Whenever a settlement is built or upgraded, three barbarians appear on coastal tiles. Whenever three barbarians occupy a hex, the hex is considered conquered, and no longer produces resources. Settlements and cities which are completely surrounded by conquered hexes also lose their victory point value while the hexes are conquered, and any harbors or fishing grounds with the settlement become inaccessible (and presumably, with Harbormaster, lose their harbor points).

Knights are played on the edges of tiles (same as roads) and are deployed through the use of development cards (though they are treated akin to Cities & Knights Progress cards in this scenario), and maybe moved along tile edges (regardless of the presence of a road). Usually, they may be moved 3 paths per turn, but payment of one grain or 2 fish increases this to 5 (it never goes above 5). Knights are used to expel barbarians: if the number of knights (from all players) around a hex is greater than that of the number of barbarians in the hex, the barbarians are captured and the hex is no longer conquered - the prisoner barbarians are distributed among the players whose knights surrounded the newly liberated hex. However, the capture of barbarians may cause knight casualties. Players who lose their knights are compensated with gold, which can be used in the same manner as described in The Rivers, except that there are no wealthiest/poor settler tiles.

One victory point is awarded for each pair of prisoner barbarians.

When combined with Catan for Two, a "foreign knight" is also introduced. The Foreign Knight is never a casualty in any barbarian battles but may be moved by both players on their turns.

When combined with Cities & Knights, only the barbarians from this game are used. Knights from Cities & Knights are built the same way they usually are in that game, but are placed at the castle and moved the same way as the normal Barbarian Attack knights, which are not used. Only active knights can fight the barbarians; however, a knight counts as multiple strength points depending on how far they have been upgraded. Knights can move extra spaces or displace an opponent's knight if they are active; taking either of these actions or participating in a battle deactivates the knight. In this version one victory point is awarded only for every three barbarians; however, barbarians keep coming even once the supply runs out by replacing 3 prisoners with a "Savior of Catan" card from Cities & Knights.

== The Friendly Robber ==
The Friendly Robber is a small rule variation that may be combined in any Catan scenario - it stipulates that the robber (and the pirate) may not be moved to a hex bordering settlements belonging to a player with two victory points (or fewer—possible with the Poor Settler tile in The Rivers of Catan). Should the robber not be able to move to any hex, the robber is moved to a desert hex (or presumably removed entirely from the game board if the variation does not have desert hex). If the robber is moved to a desert hex (either intentionally or as a result of this rule), the player moving the robber may only take resources from players with at least three victory points.

In a scenario where the robber is not used, a card may only be stolen from a player with more than the starting number of victory points.

== The Harbormaster ==
The Harbormaster is a small rule variation involving the Harbormaster bonus, a victory point bonus akin to Largest Army or Longest Road, and is compatible with virtually any Catan scenario. The Harbormaster was previously published as part of the German Atlantis expansion, as well as a free (though German-only) download from the Catan website.

With this variation, any settlement bordering a harbor earns one Harbor Point, and any city bordering a harbor earns two Harbor Points. The player with the most Harbor Points, provided that they have at least three, is awarded the Harbormaster bonus, worth two Victory Points.

The use of this variation also increases by one the number of Victory Points needed to win.

== Catan Event Cards ==
Catan Event Cards is a variation, previously offered as part of the German-only Atlantis expansion as well as a multi-language "mini-expansion", which replaces the two main dice with a deck of cards.

Instead of rolling the dice, players at the start of their turn draw a card. Each card, in addition to the outcome, contains a series of "events" that must be performed. A special "New Year" card may also be drawn, which will prompt the deck to be reshuffled. The event cards also contain the outcome on the red die, for the purposes of Cities & Knights players and the drawing of Progress cards. The red die also allows the event cards to be used in the Pirate Island scenario in Seafarers. That scenario requires knowledge of which is the smaller number on the dice; the white/yellow (depending on which edition of Settlers is being used) die value can be easily obtained by subtracting the red die from the total.

Unlike the independently offered event cards, the Traders version does not offer a small "scoring card" for players to keep track of the score.

== Catan for Two ==
Catan for Two is an official two-player variation of Settlers, compatible with any variation. Unlike two-player variations in Catan spinoffs, Catan for Two introduces two neutral players, which expand whenever either player expands (with a road, settlement, or, in Cities & Knights, when a player builds or upgrades a knight). Catan for Two also introduces Trade Tokens, which may be used to perform special actions. Trade tokens are earned whenever a player builds near a desert or coastal hex, or by sacrificing a Knight card. Trade token actions cost two trade tokens for the leading player, and one token for the trailing player.

== The Fishermen of Catan ==
The Fishermen of Catan is a variation that introduces the concept of fishing to the Catan game. Fishermen was previously offered as a separate mini-expansion, but the Traders version introduces a small rule addition.

At the start of the game, six fishing areas are put on the board, and (exclusive to Traders) a lake tile is placed on an interior hex (i.e. not adjacent to a coast). A settlement next to a fishing area or the lake has a chance to draw Fish Tokens, produced in the same manner as resources. Fish tokens may contain a fixed number of fish or the old boot. Fish may be traded in for various actions (though any excess fish in payment are lost). If a player has the old boot, the player will need one more victory point than normal to win, though the player has the option to pass the old boot to any opponent that the player is trailing or tied.

The actions are:

- 2 fish to move the robber back to the desert (without taking an opponent's card)
- 3 fish to steal a random resource card from an opponent
- 4 fish to take a free resource from the bank
- 5 fish to build a free road (or a ship, with Seafarers)
- 7 fish to take a free development card

When combined with Catan for Two, the trade token mechanic from the former game is omitted, and a player who does not have more victory points than the other player requires one less fish for any action.

== The Rivers of Catan ==
The Rivers of Catan is a variation that introduces rivers on the island of Catan. Though in the same spirit as the independently released The Great River mini-expansion (The Great River having also been part of the German-only Atlantis expansion), the two have significant differences.

At the start of the game, seven hexes are removed for two rivers - one three hexes long and one four hexes long. Whenever a settlement or road is built along the shore of either river, the player earns a coin. Bridges may also be built across the river, which earn three coins for the player and is considered to be part of a player's road network (though bridges cost two bricks and one wood, or six fish). Coins may be used to purchase resources, and are considered trading material, but are not considered themselves to be resources.

Throughout the game, the player with the most coins is named the Wealthiest Settler, which gives the player one additional victory point (no points are awarded in a tie), while the player(s) with the fewest are named Poor Settlers, which penalizes two victory points.

When combined with Cities & Knights, a player whose city is being downgraded to a settlement can pay 5 gold instead. This does not apply in Traders and Barbarians, even though it uses the same gold coins.

== The Caravans ==
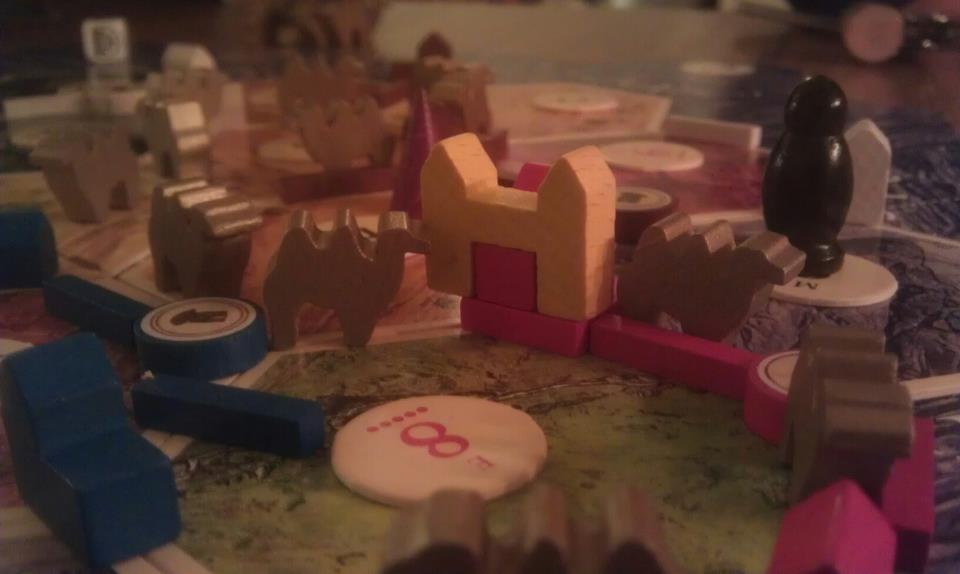
Catan Barbarians and Traders combined with Cities & Knights. The red city now earns 5 points and the road bricks are counted two times when the camel caravan is present.

The Caravans is a variation, originally released as a separate (German-only) mini-expansion, which introduces three caravan routes heading forth from a desert oasis. Whenever a settlement is built or upgraded, a voting round occurs for the right to place a camel on the board. For each vote, a player pays one wheat or one sheep (in Cities & Knights, bricks or logs are used instead). Camels are placed starting at the oasis hex (replacing the desert hex in this scenario) on the road network, and must be either adjacent to other camels or adjacent to one of the three indicated intersections on the oasis tile. Camel routes may never branch, though two or all three of the camel routes may join together. Settlements and cities on a camel route are worth an additional victory point, and roads, bridges, or ships (unlike real camels, when combined with Seafarers these camels can swim) with camels count double for the purposes of Longest Road.

== Reception ==
Nicholas Gehling, writing for the German website Media-Mania, questioned the usefulness of this expansion, saying, "The new variants are quite nice, but are pretty meager on their own. [...] A mediocre box that will keep you playing for hours. Unfortunately, the ideas are not really original or justify the price."

Jörg Lehmann, on the German website Brettspiele Report, thought the expansion was useful, saying, "The 5 campaigns in particular are all well worked out, coherent and each requires a different winning strategy from the players. [...] All in all, they aren't all bad, and who likes what is, as always, a matter of taste."
