= Struggle for Rome (board game) =

Catan Histories: Struggle for Rome is a 2006 German-style board game based on the game mechanics of Settlers of Catan, depicting the fall of the Western Roman Empire. The game is created by Klaus Teuber, the creator of Settlers, and is published under license from Catan GmbH by Kosmos in German and Mayfair Games in English. It is the second game in the Catan Histories series of board games. Often games produced in different languages by different publishers have slight rule differences between the versions. Catan Histories: Struggle for Rome is no exception.

== Gameplay ==
At the start of each game, each player is in control of a barbarian tribe situated outside of the Roman Empire. Each player's barbarian tribe consists of a tribe of warriors and a tribe of horsemen. To win, a player must gain ten victory points from sacking and ultimately conquering Roman cities.

The gameboard consists of a hexagonal grid, with cities situated on certain intersections. Like in Settlers, each hex consists of a terrain type as well as a number token. Unlike Settlers, there are only four terrain types, of which three terrain types produce resources (of these, one produces one of two different resources). Certain edges between points are denoted with arrows - these have significance in the movement of barbarian tribes. In addition to the gameboard, a supply of coins is also given, providing a supplementary "gold" resource.

At the start of each turn, a player first rolls the dice, and, if a 7 is not rolled, the players collect resources. Like Settlers, all players collect resources whenever their cities or nomadic tribes are adjacent to a hex with a number token matching the number rolled on the dice. However, unlike Settlers, in Struggle for Rome a player can only gain one resource from any hex, regardless of the number of cities or nomadic tribes that are in its surrounding intersections. If a 7 is rolled, the Roman Legionnaire, the Struggle for Rome version of the Settlers robber, is moved to any hex on the board, and a player may steal a resource (or three (two gold in English version) gold in lieu of a resource) from a player with a city or tribe adjacent. Unlike Settlers, there is no limit to the number of resource a player may have in their possession (except when there are not enough resources to be distributed to all players).

Resource collection is done four times (however, each of the four times must have a different number showing on the dice). After the resources are rolled, each player may, in turn, trade and build, starting with the player on move. Players may trade resources and gold for any agreed-upon price - however all trades must involve the player who is trading and building. Players may use their resources to buy development cards (which may be played any time after purchase, with each card granting different effects) or augment their two tribes by adding warriors, horsemen, or supply wagons.

After trading and building is completed by all players, players may take action with their horseman tribe, and after each player has taken action, do the same with their warrior tribe. A player may choose to take no action, in which they receive 2 gold (or a resource in the English version). Each tribe, when nomadic, may choose to move their tribe to any unoccupied intersection on the board - however, moving over edges marked with arrows may cost resources and gold. When a tribe is adjacent to a city, they may attempt to sack the city or conquer it - in either case, the number of horsemen or warriors (whichever is relevant) must exceed the city's defense value (which may vary from 2 for outlying cities and 5 for Rome itself). If a city is sacked, the player may reveal the plunder token that is placed there at the start of the game for their reward (which may also incur losses in warriors or spearmen). If a city is conquered, the plunder token (if still extant) is discarded, and a supply wagon from the tribe and a warrior or horseman (whichever is applicable) is placed at the location of the conquered city, and the tribe in question ceases to be nomadic. A city may only be conquered if the tribe in question has sacked at least one city in three of the five provinces depicted. A tribe with a city may attempt to conquer (never pillage) a nearby city through similar means.

Players earn one victory point for each city, as well as two points if both tribes have established four cities. A player also earns two points if either tribe has plundered a city in every province. Some development cards are worth one victory point, while others, called "Diplomats", allow the players to act as though they had rolled a 7, and give two victory points for the first player to play three of them. The victory points are stolen if another player plays more. The game ends whenever any player has ten victory points, at which point the game is continued until the end of the turn. At this point, the player with the most victory points (the most gold if this is tied) wins.

=== Terror of the Legions ===
Terror of the Legions is a downloadable, minor expansion for Struggle for Rome. It introduces a one victory point bonus awarded to players who have conquered three cities with four or five towers each, marked on the board with a special symbol. When this expansion is used, the game is played to 11 points instead of ten.
