= Überplay =

US board game publishing company

Überplay Entertainment
- Company type: Private
- Founded: 2003
- Founder: Jeremy Young & Matt Molen
- Defunct: 2008
- Fate: Dissolved
- Headquarters: St. George, Utah, United States

Überplay Entertainment was a board game publishing company located in St. George, Utah, and was founded by Jeremy Young and Matt Molen in 2003. As of April 2008, it had ceased operations. The company held three separate brands: Überplay provided family-oriented "Euro-style" board games; Inspiration Games developed games aimed at religious markets; Überplay Digital targeted PC based gaming.

Überplay-published games include: Ra, Motley Fool's Buy Low - Sell High, Alhambra, Metro, Hoity Toity, and Hansa. In 2004, New England won the Traditional Game of the Year by Games Magazine.

Under the Inspiration Games imprint, Überplay's published religious-based games, including The Settlers of Zarahemla (similar to The Settlers of Catan) and The Ark of the Covenant (similar to Carcassonne).
