= The Ark of the Covenant (game) =

The Ark of the Covenant is a 2003 board game published by Inspiration Games.

== Gameplay ==
The Ark of the Covenant is a game in which players compete for features like cities, roads, fields, and temples while using new elements—oases, prophets, revised field and temple scoring, and the movable Ark—to earn additional strategic points.

== Reviews ==
- Pyramid
- The Way, The Truth & The Dice - Issue #4
