= The Settlers of Canaan =

Board game for 2 to 4 players

Settlers of Canaan
- Settlers of Canaan
- Publishers: Cactus Game Design
- Players: 2 to 4
- Setup time: approx. 10 minutes
- Playing time: 45 to 60 minutes
- Chance: Medium
- Age range: 7 years and up
- Skills: Dice rolling, Trading

Settlers of Canaan is a multiplayer board game which is an adaptation of Catan and includes themes from the Hebrew Bible. It was published in 2002 by Cactus Game Design, based in North Carolina.

Settlers of Canaan takes place in the ancient land of Canaan, which roughly corresponds to the northern half of present-day Israel and the Southern Levant.

== Differences from Catan and gameplay ==
Settlers of Canaan is playable by two to four players. Much like Catan, players play the role of settlers, creating settlements, harvesting resources and trading with other players. In Settlers of Canaan, the settlers are represented by the various tribes of Israel which settled in Canaan.

The game is different from Catan in a couple of ways, such as the differences in the development cards and what certain aspects of the game are known as. The main difference is the "fixed" nature of the board, where (like many other Catan variants) both the hexagonal land tiles and the numerical disks are printed directly onto the board, while Catan's board is randomized at the start of each game.

Additionally, one land tile known as the "copper hex" (equivalent to the gold hex in Catan) allows players bordering it to select which resources it produces. Several trading ports are also spread across the board, meant to represent the Great Sea on the western side of the board and the coast of the Sea of Galilee which is surrounded by land hexes.

In Settlers of Canaan, the robber tile of Catan is replaced by the "plague" tile. The tiles work the same way, which is to stop any production on a hex. The plague tile can be "cleansed" (moved) through the use of a "priest"; itself a replacement of the knight or soldier card in Catan. Should a player have the most priests, the player is awarded the "most priests" card, which gives the player an additional two victory points.

If ties exist in competition for either the longest road or the most priests, then the corresponding two-point bonus is removed from play.

The game ends when a player reaches 12 victory points or when the "Wall of Jerusalem" is completed, whichever comes first. In the latter scenario, the player with the most victory points wins the game. (If two or more players tie, then the winner is the player who has contributed more stones to the Wall of Jerusalem. If a tie exists in this tiebreaker, then gameplay continues until a clear winner emerges.)

=== The Wall of Jerusalem and the King's Blessing ===
A player may build a "stone for Jerusalem" at a cost of one stone resource (called "clay" in Catan) and one ore resource, during his or her turn under one of two conditions:

1. The player owns a settlement or city on the southern border of Canaan (west of the Salt Sea), or
2. Another player owns a settlement or city on the southern border of Canaan, and the current player owns a settlement or city that is connected to the other player's settlement or city by a (multiplayer) trade route.

When a player builds a stone for Jerusalem, this stone is immediately placed in the Wall of Jerusalem, an area in the desert south of Canaan which can hold up to 28 such stones. If a player builds a stone using a multiplayer trade route, then that player must pay one resource card of his or her choice to the owner of the trade route's final settlement or city.

The player who has contributed the most stones to the Wall of Jerusalem earns the King's Blessing, which is worth 2 victory points and gives that player the privilege of trading a resource of his or her choice at a 2:1 ratio. If another player later ties for the most stones in the Wall of Jerusalem, then the King's Blessing is removed from play until someone achieves a singular majority.

Every time a 7 is rolled during gameplay, a black stone is added to the Wall of Jerusalem. These stones do not affect the King's Blessing, but they may help bring the end of the game before anyone reaches the required 12 victory points. Additionally, anyone with more than 7 resource tiles in their hand will lose half of them and the person who rolled a 7 gets to move the plague. This can be placed on a hex on the board in order to stop the hex from producing any resources and allows the roller to steal a card from a player who has a settlement of city that borders the hex.

=== Development cards ===
Many development cards in this game resemble those from Settlers of Catan; several are similar to progress cards from Cities and Knights of Catan. Some, however, are unique to this game. Below is a list of available development cards; the quantity of each type of card is given in parentheses:

==== Settlers of Catan development cards ====
- The "Road Building" card is called "New Trade Route." (1)
- The "Year of Plenty" card is called "Plentiful Lands." (1)
- The "Knight/Soldier" card is called "Priest." (20)
- The "Monopoly" card is called "Caleb's Blessing" (1)
- The single victory point cards are called "Divine Guidance," "City of Refuge," "Ladder to Heaven," and "Ten Commandments." (4)

==== Cities and Knights of Catan progress cards ====
- The "Spy" card is called "Gibeon/Gibeonite Trickery." (1)
- The "Merchant Fleet" card is called "Caravan." (2)
- The "Medicine" card is called "Improvements." (1)
- The "Irrigation" card is called "Bountiful Harvest." (1)
- The "Alchemist" card is called "Prophet." (1)

==== Unique development cards ====
- The "Korah's Rebellion" card allows a player to remove another player's Priest card and shuffle it into the remaining development cards. (1)
- The "Deborah's Song" card allows each player to select one resource card from the bank, regardless of whose turn it is. (1)
