= Catan Historical Scenarios I: Alexander and Cheops =

Board game

- Publishers: 999games; danspill; Kosmos
- Publication: 1998
- Genres: Board game
- Players: 2–4
- Playing time: 90 minutes
- Chance: Medium
- Skills: Negotiation; Strategy

Catan Historical Scenarios I: Alexander and Cheops (German: Die Siedler von Catan Historische Szenarien: Alexander der Grosse & Cheops) is the first of two Historical Scenario expansions to the Catan board game, distributed by Kosmos in Germany in 1998 and redistributed with rules translations in various other territories. The Historical Scenarios put the players in historical settings, while maintaining the Catan game mechanics. The Historical Scenarios are generally considered to be the forerunners to the later Catan Histories series of board games (which, similar to the Historical Scenarios, incorporate Catan-style game mechanics with historical settings), though the latter are fully independent games with their own game parts.

== Alexander the Great ==
In this scenario, players take on the role of advisors to Alexander the Great. At the start of the game, there are no settlements, and Alexander starts at a specified point on the game board. After each turn, Alexander moves one space on the path until he reaches another point on the board, at which point he only moves forward whenever a 7 is rolled.

At the beginning of the game, players receive resources from a "supply stack". After each turn, players take one resource card from the supply stack until the stack is exhausted. During the first turn, the dice are not rolled (as there are no resources for any player to collect). For the first few turns, players without settlements bid (in resources) for the right to place a settlement at Alexander's location (players with settlements may collect resources as normal).

As turns pass, Alexander may come across event chips. These trigger events, which have dependencies on certain resources (and for one event, Knight cards). Players bid in the permitted resources (if Knights are permitted, they are treated as three resources) for the right to resolve the event. Depending on the event, the winning player may keep the event chip (the only case where this does not happen is when the event gives the winner a settlement at Alexander's location). The three players with the most event chips (at least three) win the First Counselor, Second Counselor, or Third Counselor cards, depending on their standing. The First Counselor is worth four victory points, the Second Counselor three victory points, and the third Counselor two.

Players may also expand as normal, though settlements may not be built directly on Alexander's route or on intersections next to the part of the route ahead of Alexander.

The game ends when either a player accumulates 14 victory points, or when Alexander is at the end of the route, in which case, the leading player (event chips are used as a tiebreaker) is declared the winner.

== Cheops ==
In this scenario, players take on the role of Egyptian nobles, where they must build a pyramid for the Pharaoh Cheops.

At the start of the game, players place three settlements along the Nile river (represented by a series of marked intersections). Certain hexes are "gold hexes", which produce gold pieces. Gold pieces can be traded in the same manner as resources, and are used to compensate opponents for using their road network - in Cheops, a player may use the services of a harbour if they have a settlement there or are connected through a series of roads to such a settlement (for which the owner receives compensation if the harbour is used). Ships may also be built as in Catan: Seafarers, though unlike Seafarers, ships may not be moved, though ships and roads may be connected without a settlement in between.

Aside from expanding as in the main Catan game, players may choose to contribute to building the pyramid - this can only be done if a player has a settlement at the base of the pyramid (represented by another series of marked intersections), or is connected by a series of roads to such a settlement (though the owner of said settlement is given gold pieces as compensation). Whenever a 7 is rolled and a settlement is at the base of the pyramid, the Pharaoh also contributes a piece to the pyramid. The player with the most pyramid pieces receives the "Pharaoh's Blessing" bonus, worth three victory points, while the players with the fewest pieces receives the "Pharaoh's Curse", which deducts two victory points.

The game ends when any player obtains 12 victory points, when the pyramid is finished, or when the supply of Pharaoh pieces is exhausted; the latter two giving the victory with the leading player (gold pieces are used as a tiebreaker).
