= Catan: Cities & Knights =

Board game expansion set

- Designers: Klaus Teuber
- Publishers: Kosmos; Mayfair Games; Capcom; 999 Games
- Players: 3 or 4 (standard); 2, 5, or 6 (w/ expansions)
- Setup time: approx. 10 minutes
- Playing time: ~90 minutes
- Chance: Medium
- Age range: 12 years and up
- Skills: Dice rolling, Trading

Catan: Cities & Knights (German: Städte und Ritter), formerly The Cities and Knights of Catan, is an expansion to the board game The Settlers of Catan for three to four players (five to six player play is also possible with the Settlers and Cities & Knights five to six player extensions; two-player play is possible with the Traders & Barbarians expansion). It contains features taken from The Settlers of Catan, with emphasis on city development and the use of knights, which are used as a method of attacking other players as well as helping opponents defend Catan against a common foe. Cities & Knights can also be combined with the Catan: Seafarers expansion or with Catan: Traders & Barbarians scenarios (again, five to six player play only possible with the applicable five to six player extension(s)).

== Differences from The Settlers of Catan ==
Because of the new rules introduced in Cities & Knights, the game is played to 13 victory points, as opposed to 10 as in the base game The Settlers of Catan.

The following cards are not used in Cities & Knights:

- the Development Cards—which have been replaced by Progress Cards.
- the Building Cost Cards—the information on these cards is provided by the City Upgrade Calendar.
- the "Largest Army" Card—having a large army is still an advantage, but does not earn victory points so directly as in the regular version of The Settlers of Catan. Instead of soldier cards, one is now able to purchase the eponymous knights.

== Commodities ==
One of the main additions to the game is commodities, which are a type of secondary resource produced only by cities. Like resources, commodities are associated with a type of terrain, can be stolen by the robber (with Seafarers, also the pirate), count against the resource hand limit, and may not be collected if the robber is on the terrain. Resources may be traded for commodities, and commodities may be traded for resources. Commodities can then be used to build city improvements (provided the player has a city), which provide additional benefits.

The commodities are paper (which comes from forest terrain), coin (from mountain terrain), and cloth (from pasture terrain).

When combining Cities & Knights with Barbarian Attack, the written rules are ambiguous with regards to whether commodities are collected along with normal resources when collecting from a Gold River tile, as well as whether or not commodities can be collected directly from Gold River tiles. However, online rules state that "Gold can only buy you resources, not commodities."

A city on grain or brick gives two of each, as in the original Settlers. A city on wool, ore, or wood, produces one corresponding resource as well as one corresponding commodity (cloth, coin, or paper). Grain and brick, however, are used for new purchasing options: grain activates knights, and brick can be used to build city walls.

In total there are 36 commodity cards: 12 paper (from forest), 12 cloth (from pasture), and 12 coin (from mountains).

== City improvements ==
A player with a city may use commodities to build city improvements, which allow several advantages. There are city improvements in five levels, and in three different categories. Each category of improvements requires a different commodity and higher levels require more cards of that commodity. At the third level, players earn a special ability, depending on the type of improvement.

The first player with an improvement at the fourth level can claim any of their cities as a metropolis, worth four victory points instead of two for that city. Each type of improvement has only one associated metropolis, and no city can be a metropolis of two different types (because of this, a player without a non-metropolis city may not build improvements beyond the third level). If a player is the first to build an improvement to the final level (out-building the current holder of the metropolis), they take the metropolis from its current holder.

== Knights ==
The other significant concept in Cities & Knights is the concept of knights, which replace the concept of soldiers and the largest army. Knights are units that require continuous maintenance through their activation mechanism, but have a wide variety of functions. Knights can be promoted through three ranks, although promotion to the final rank is a special ability granted by the city improvement the Fortress.

Knights are placed on the board in a similar manner to settlements, and can be used to block opposing roads, active or not. However, knights must be activated in order to perform other functions, which immediately deactivate the knight. Knights cannot perform actions on the same turn they are activated, but can be reactivated on the same turn as performing an action. These actions include:

- Moving along a road (with Seafarers, a line of ships)
- Displacing opposing knights of a lower rank, forcing the lower ranked knight to retreat
- Dispelling the robber (with Seafarers, also the pirate) if it is stationed nearby

If a knight is promoted or forced to retreat, its active status does not change.

The standard Cities & Knights game comes with 24 knights, 6 of each color. The 5/6 player extension adds a further 12 knights, 6 each of two new colors.

== Barbarian attacks ==
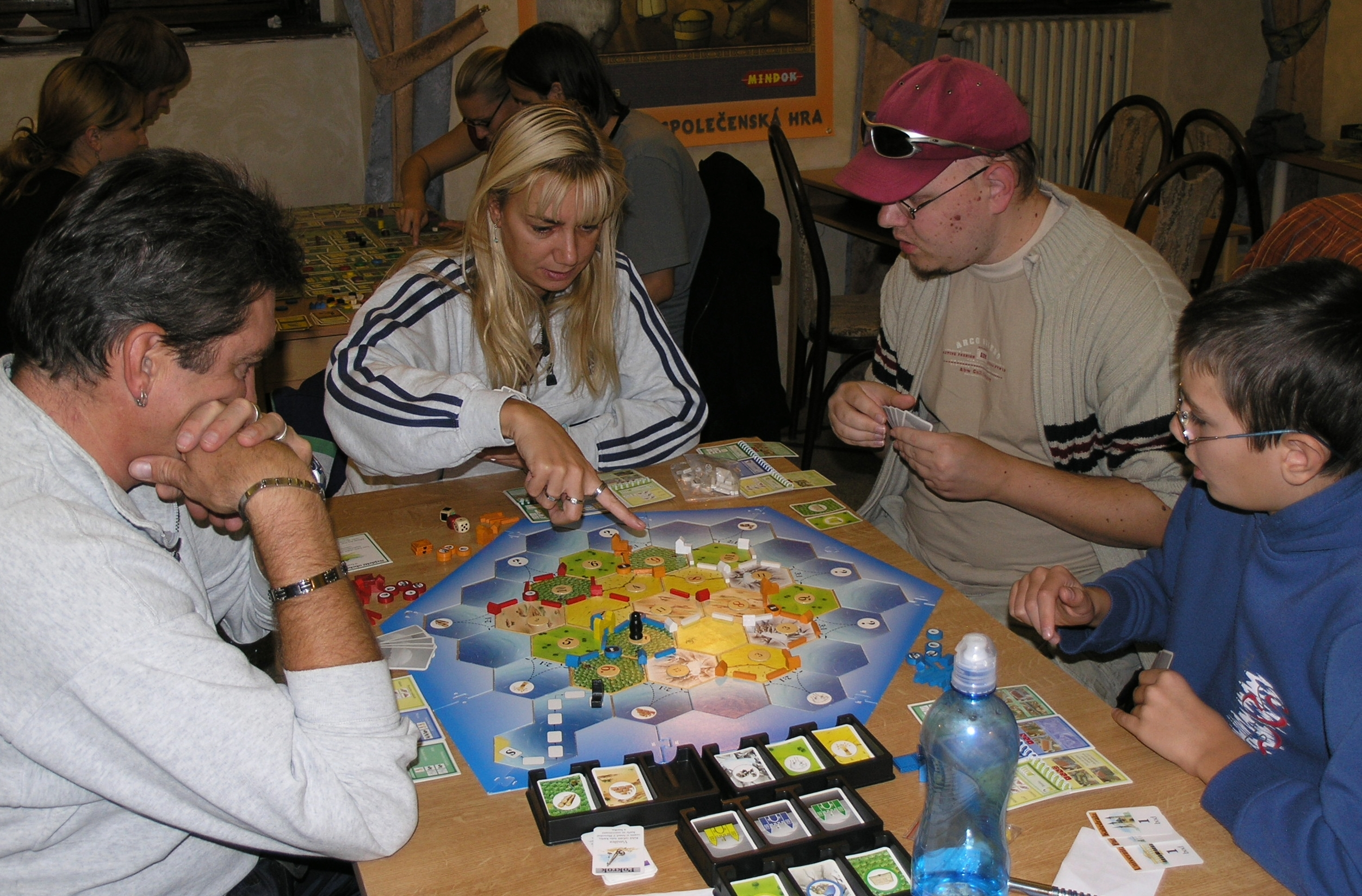
Barbarian attack

Cities & Knights introduces a third die, known as the event die, which serves two functions. The first applies to the concept of barbarians, a periodic foe that all players must work together to defend against. Three of the sides of the event die have a picture of a ship on them. The other three sides have a symbol of a city gate, allowing players who have sufficiently built up a city to obtain progress cards (see below).

The barbarians are represented by a ship positioned on a track representing the distance between the ship and Catan (i.e. the board). Each time the event die shows a black ship, the barbarian ship takes one step closer to Catan. When the barbarians arrive at Catan, a special phase is immediately performed before all other actions (including collecting resources). In this special phase, the barbarians' attack strength, corresponding to the combined number of cities and metropolises held by all players, is compared to Catan's defense strength, corresponding to the combined levels (i.e. 1 point for each basic, 2 for each strong, and 3 for each mighty) of all activated knights in play.

If the barbarians are successful in their attack (if they have a strength greater than Catan), then the players must pay the consequence. The player(s) who had the least defense will be attacked, and will have one city reduced to a settlement. If they only have settlements, or metropolises, then they are immune to barbarians and do not count as the player contributing the least defense.

Should Catan prevail, the player who contributes the most to Catan's defense receives a special Defender of Catan card, worth a victory point. Regardless of the outcome, all knights are immediately deactivated, and the barbarian ship returns to its starting point on the track. In the event of a tie among the greatest contributors of knights, none of the tied players earn a Defender of Catan card. Instead, each of the tied players draw a progress card (explained below) of the type of their choosing. There are 6 Defender of Catan cards.

As the likelihood of having the barbarian move closer to Catan is very high, a variant in common usage is that the robber (and with Seafarers, the pirate) does not move until the first barbarian attack, nor can a knight move the robber before that point.

Examples where cities are lost:

1. Player A has 3 cities and 1 active strong knight. Player B has 1 city and 2 active basic knights. Player C has 2 cities and 1 active basic knight. When the barbarians attack, player C will lose one of their cities, because the attack strength (6 cities) is greater than all knights combined (5 knights).
2. Player A has 3 cities and 2 active basic knights. Player B has 1 city, which is a metropolis, and no active knights. Player C has 2 cities and 1 active mighty knight. Player B's city is a metropolis, and metropolises cannot be destroyed by the barbarians, so Player A loses a city because they have the next fewest active knights.
3. Player A has 2 cities and 2 active basic knights. Player B has 3 cities and 1 active strong knight. Player C has 2 cities and 2 active basic knights. All players will lose a city, because they all tie in the number of knights activated, and the barbarian attack strength (7 cities) is greater than number of active knights (6 knights).
4. Player A has 3 cities and 1 active mighty knight and 1 active basic knight. Player B has 2 cities, which both are metropolises, and 1 active basic knight. Player C has 1 city, which is a metropolis, and no active knights. First in line to lose a city is player C, but because their city is a metropolis we need to look at the person next in line. This would be player B, but the same applies for them: they have activated only 1 knight, but both of their cities are metropolises. This leaves player A to lose a city.

== Progress cards ==
The other significant outcome of the event die is Progress cards, which replace development cards. Because of the mechanics of progress cards explained below, one of the two white dice used in Settlers is replaced by a red die.

Progress cards are organized into three categories, corresponding to the three types of improvements. Yellow progress cards aid in commercial development, green progress cards aid in technological advancements, and blue progress cards allow for political moves. When a castle appears on the event die, progress cards of the corresponding type may be drawn depending on the value of the red die. Higher levels of city improvements increase the chance that progress cards will be drawn, with the highest level of city improvement allowing progress cards to be drawn regardless of the value on the red die.

Progress cards, unlike the development cards they replace, can be played on the turn that they are drawn, and more than one progress card can be played per turn. However, they can generally only be played after the dice are rolled. Progress cards granting victory points are an exception, being played immediately (without regards to whose turn it is), while the Alchemist progress card, which allows a player to select the roll of the white and red dice, necessitates the card being played instead of rolling the numerical dice. (The event die is still rolled as normal.)

Players are allowed to keep four progress cards (five in a five to six player game), and any additional ones must be discarded on the spot (unless the 5th card is a victory point, which is played immediately and the original progress cards remain). The only exception to this rule is when the player receives a 5th non-victory point progress card during their turn, in which case the player may choose to play any one of the five progress cards in hand, bringing the progress card count back down to four. While this clarification is not overtly stated in the Cities & Knights rule book, it is enforced in the online version of the game.

In total, there are 54 progress cards: 18 science, 18 politics, and 18 trade.

Out of all the available progress cards, progress cards containing victory points can be only earned in the science and politics categories.

== City walls ==
City walls are a minor addition to Cities & Knights that increase the number of resource and commodity cards a player is allowed in their hand before having to discard on a roll of 7. However, they do not protect the player from the robber or barbarians. Only cities and metropolises may have walls, and each city or metropolis can only have one wall, up to three walls per player. Each wall that the player has deployed permits the player to hold two more cards before being required to discard on a roll of seven. This results in a maximum of 13 cards.

If the barbarians pillage your city, then the city wall is also destroyed and the wall is removed from the board.

The game comes with 12 city walls, 3 of each color.

== The Merchant ==
The merchant is another addition to Cities & Knights. Like the robber, the merchant is placed on a single land hex. Unlike the robber, the merchant has a beneficial effect.

The merchant can only be deployed through the use of a Merchant progress card (of which there are six), on a land hex near a city or a settlement. The player with the control of the merchant can trade the resource (not commodity) of that type at a two-to-one rate, as if the player had a control of a corresponding two-to-one harbor.

The player with the control of the merchant also earns a victory point. Both the victory point and the trade privilege are lost if another player takes control of the merchant.

== City Upgrade Calendar ==
In place of The Settlers of Catan standard improvement cost card, Cities & Knights gives a calendar type flip-chart to each player, matching that player's color. The top of the chart has the standard costs from the Settlers game (for settlements, upgrade to city, and roads). It does not include the Development Card cost as those cards are not used in a Cities & Knights game. It does include the costs of hiring a knight, upgrading a knight's level or strength, and the cost to activate a knight. It also includes the cost of a ship, which are not used in a regular game of Cities & Knights, but presumably this is to cater for players who have combined Cities & Knights and Seafarers.

Those are only the rudimentary costs of the game however. The calendar also shows the costs of the next city improvement in each of the three categories — as a city is improved in a category, that segment has its card flipped down calendar style to reveal the newly built improvement, any advantages gained by the improvement, and the updated cost of upgrading to the next level in that category. Each segment, as it is flipped down, also shows the updated dice pattern needed to earn the player a progress card in that category.

== Catan Legend of the Conquerors ==
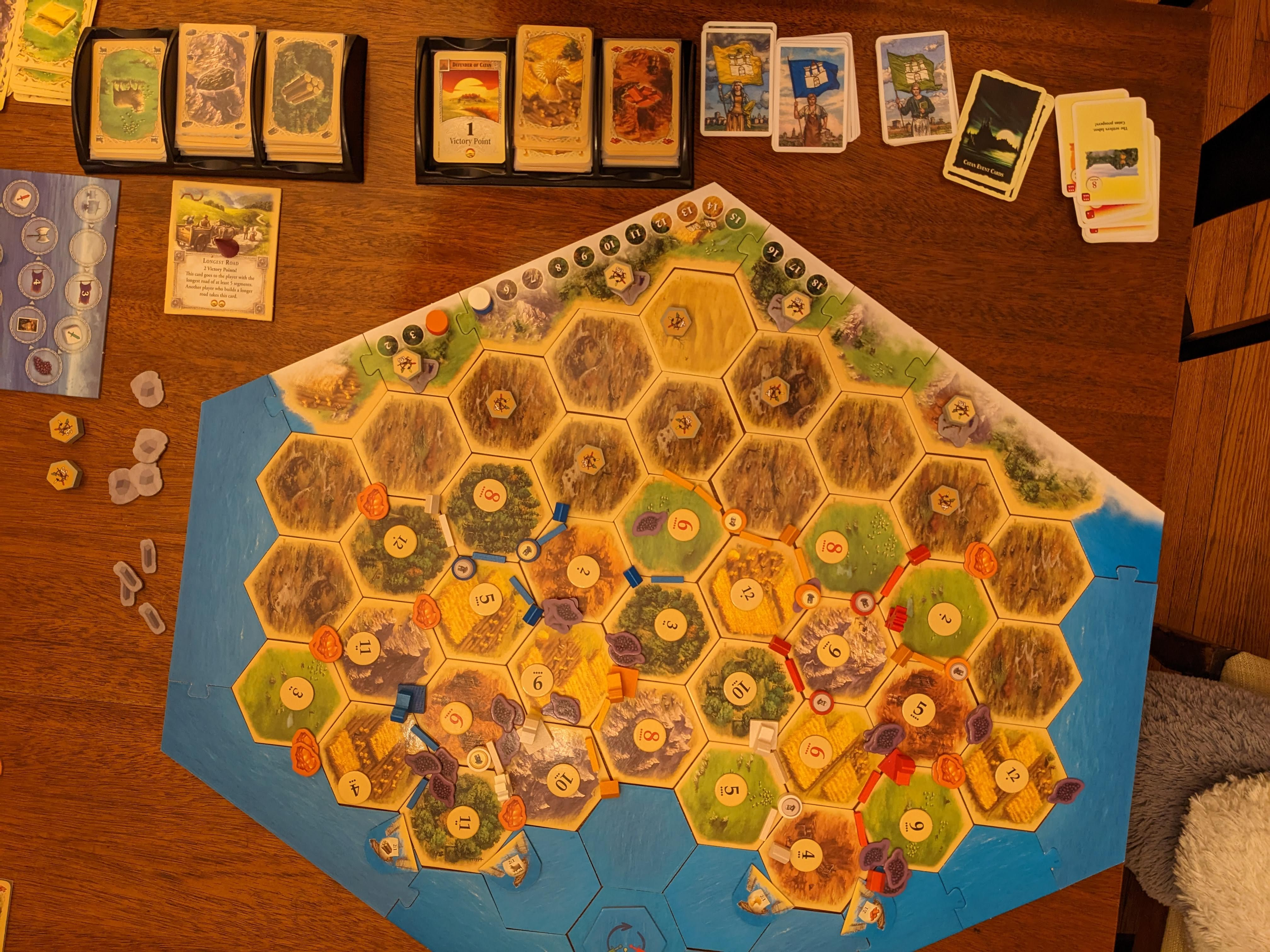
Catan Legend of the Conquerors board game

Catan: Legend of the Conquerors is a scenario released in 2017 for the expansion Catan: Cities & Knights. A blog post was made in connection with the release. The game adds swamp hexes to the board. The game also adds a cannon which can be combined with a knight to increase the strength of a knight by one, which makes the maximum possible strength 4, when applied to a mighty knight of strength 3 ($1+3=4$). To build a cannon, you pay 1 lumber and 1 ore for a foundry. When you combine a cannon and a knight you have a cannoneer. The game also adds a horse farm that you can build for one lumber and one grain. The horse farm gives you a horse that you can use to turn one of your knights into cavalry. A cavalry unit can move between road networks, even if there is no connection between them. The cannon and horse cannot be combined. The blog post writes, "Some strategists may like the idea of equipping a knight with a horse and a cannon, thus making it some kind of overpowering “mounted cannoneer.” However, you are not allowed to place both playing pieces adjacent to a knight. This being said, it's also hard to imagine a knight on a horse holding a cannon in his arms and firing it in all directions... "

== Reviews ==
- Pyramid
