= Catan: Seafarers =

Expansion for the Catan board game

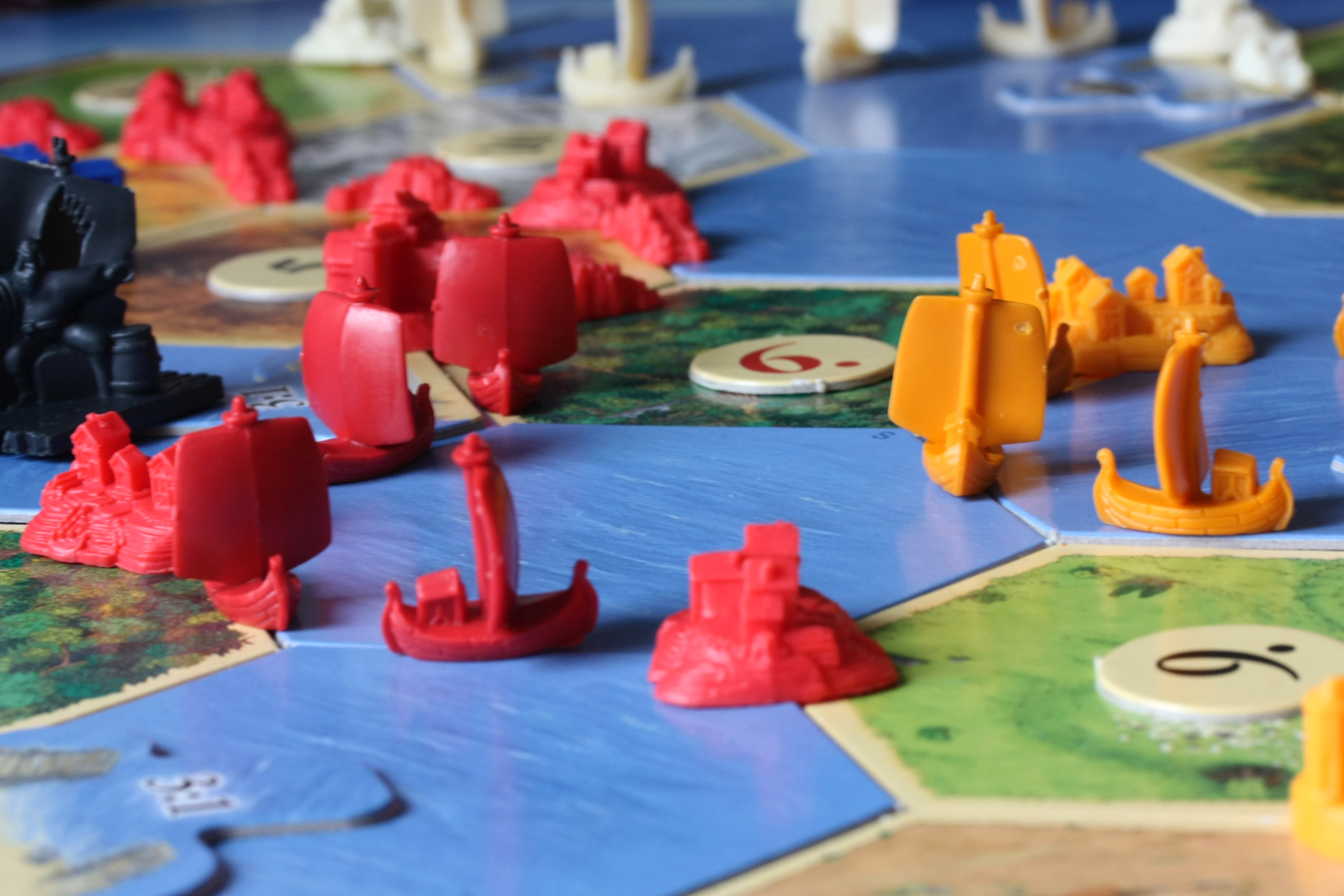
Water tiles and ships tokens - new in "Seafarers of Catan"

Catan: Seafarers, or Seafarers of Catan in older editions (German: Die Seefahrer von Catan), is an expansion of the board game Catan for three to four players (five-to-six-player play is also possible with both of the respective five-to-six-player extensions). The main feature of this expansion is the addition of ships, gold fields, and the pirate to the game, allowing play between multiple islands. The expansion also provides numerous scenarios, some of which have custom rules. The Seafarers rules and scenarios are also, for the most part, compatible with Catan: Cities & Knights and Catan: Traders & Barbarians.

The concepts introduced in Seafarers were part of designer Klaus Teuber's original design for Settlers.

== Ships ==
Seafarers introduces the concept of ships, which serve as roads over water or along the coast. Each ship costs one lumber and one wool to create (lumber for the hull and wool for the sails). A settlement must first be built before a player can switch from building roads to building ships, or vice versa. Thus, a chain of ships is always anchored at a settlement on the coast. A shipping line that is not anchored at both ends by different settlements can also move the last ship at the open end, although this can only be done once per turn and may not be done with any ships that were created on the same turn.

The "Longest Road" card is now renamed the "Longest Trade Route" since this is now calculated by counting the number of contiguous ships plus roads that a player has. A settlement or city is necessary between a road and a ship for the two to be considered continuous for the purposes of this card.

The Road Building card allows a player to build 2 roads, 2 ships, or one of each when used.

Along with the concept of ships, Seafarers also introduces the notion of the pirate, which acts as a waterborne robber which steals from nearby ships (similar to how the robber steals from nearby settlements). The pirate can also prevent ships from being built or moved nearby, but it does not interfere with harbors. The pirate does not prevent settlements from being built.

When a seven is rolled or a Knight card is played, the player may move either the robber OR the pirate.

== Gold Rivers ==
Seafarers also introduces the "Gold River" or "Gold Field" terrain, which grants nearby players one resource of their choice for every settlement adjacent to a gold tile and 2 resources for every city. Since being able to choose any resource type allows more building power, gold rivers are often either marked with number token of only 2 or 3 dots and/or are far away from starting positions to offset this.

When combined with Cities & Knights, the rules state that you are not allowed to take commodities instead of resources if a city is nearby.

== Exploration ==
Some scenarios have extra rules encompassing the concept of exploration, which is done by having the hex tiles placed face down. Should a player build next to unexplored terrain, the terrain tile is turned face up, and the player is rewarded with a resource should the tile revealed be resource-producing. In other scenarios, the board is divided into islands, and if the player builds a settlement on an island other than the ones they begin on, the settlement is worth extra victory points.

The Cities and Knights manual recommends that players not use the Cities & Knights rules in scenarios where exploration is a factor.

== Scenarios ==
Unlike The Settlers of Catan and Catan: Cities & Knights, in which the only random element of setup is the placement of land tiles, number tokens, and harbors in an identically shaped playing area, Catan: Seafarers has a number of different scenarios or maps from which to choose. Each map uses a different selection of tiles laid out in a specific pattern, which may not use all of the tiles. Other attributes also set each map apart, for example, restrictions on the placement of initial settlements, whether tiles are distributed randomly, the number of victory points needed to win, and special victory point awards, usually for building on islands across the sea.

Seafarers provides scenarios for three or four players (the older fourth edition used the same maps for three- and four-player versions of the scenarios), while the extension provides scenarios for six players (the older third edition also included separate maps for five- and six-player scenarios). The scenarios between the older editions of Seafarers and the newest are generally incompatible, knowing the different frames included with the game. (In particular, older editions of Settlers did not come with a frame for their board; a separate add-on was made available for players of the older-edition Settlers games, containing the newer edition frames, so as to make them compatible with the newer edition of Seafarers; the older edition of Seafarers included a square frame, and while both older and newer editions of the frames have the same width across, the newer editions are not square-shaped, and are longer down the middle of the board compared to the sides.)

=== Heading to New Shores ===
Heading to New Shores (New Shores in older editions) is the scenario resembling Teuber's original design for the game. The game board consists of the main Settlers island as well as a few smaller islands, which award a special victory point to each player for their first settlements on them. This scenario is meant for players new to Seafarers, with elements of Seafarers incorporated into the more familiar main board.

=== The Four Islands ===
The Four Islands is the first scenario introduced where new mechanics introduced to Seafarers is brought into the forefront. In this scenario, the map is split up into four islands of roughly equal size and resource distribution. (The six-player version found in the extension has the map split into six islands; the scenario is titled The Six Islands, but is played identically. Older editions of the extension had a five-player version with five islands, called The Five Islands.) Players may claim up to two of the islands as their home islands, and settling on any of the other islands awards a special victory point.

=== The Fog Island ===
The Fog Island (Oceans in older editions) is the first scenario where exploration is used. The board starts off with a portion of the map left blank: when players expand into the blank region, terrain hexes are drawn at random from a supply and placed in the empty space, and, if a land hex is "discovered", a number token may be assigned. As a reward for discovering land, the player making the discovery is rewarded with a bonus resource card corresponding to the type of land hex discovered.

=== Through the Desert ===
Through the Desert (Into the Desert in older edition) is similar to The Four Islands, but consists of a large continent and smaller outlying islands. On the large island, there exists a "wall of deserts" that separates the island into a large main area and separate smaller strips of land. As the name of the scenario implies, expanding through the desert into these smaller strips of land, or by sea to the outlying islands, award bonus victory points.

=== The Forgotten Tribe ===
The Forgotten Tribe, originally titled Friendly Neighbors, was a downloadable scenario (but only in the German language) which was incorporated into newer editions of Seafarers.

The map consists of a main island and smaller outlying islands, where the namesake forgotten tribe resides. Players may not expand into the outlying islands, but by building ships so that they border the outlying islands, players may be awarded with victory points, development cards, or harbors that players may place on the coast of the main island at a later time.

=== Cloth for Catan ===
Introduced in the newer editions, Cloth for Catan continues the adventures with the Forgotten Tribe. The scenario was previously available for older editions as a downloadable scenario (but only in German), titled Coffee for Catan.

Players begin with settlements on the outside of the map, but may build ships to reach the Forgotten Tribe's islands, which are in the center. By connecting to the Forgotten Tribe's settlements (represented by number tokens), players may earn cloth tokens when the number token for the Forgotten Tribe's villages are rolled. Cloth tokens, in turn, are worth one victory point for each pair obtained.

=== The Pirate Island ===
The Pirate Island, introduced in newer editions, is the first scenario which changes the mechanics of new gameplay elements introduced in Seafarers. The Pirate Island had previously been available as a downloadable scenario (but only in German) suitable for the older editions.

In this scenario, players begin with a pre-placed settlement on a main island. Ships may only be built in one single line, which must pass through a fixed waypoint (different for each player) en route to a pirate fortress (each player has their own pirate fortress). Once ships connect to the pirate fortress, they may attempt to attack the pirate fortress once per turn. Ships may be lost if the attack is unsuccessful, but after three successful attacks, the pirate fortress is converted into a settlement. Players must convert their pirate fortresses and have 10 victory points before being able to claim victory.

Furthermore, the pirate mechanics have also changed: the pirate moves through the middle of the map in a fixed path every turn, and attacks the owner of any nearby settlements. Players win resources if they are able to fend off the pirate attack (which depends on the number rolled by the dice, as well as the number of warships in the defending player's possession; warships are created from using Knight cards on existing ships), but lose resources if they are unsuccessful. Maritime expansion is only permitted by building a settlement at the waypoint, however, this increases the chances of a pirate attack.

=== The Wonders of Catan ===
The Wonders of Catan was a downloadable scenario for older editions of Seafarers in both German and English, and was incorporated into Seafarers in newer editions.

In this scenario, there are a number of "wonders", each with a large cost of building as well as a prerequisite. If a player meets the prerequisite for a wonder, they may claim the wonder for themselves. A player may only claim one wonder, and each wonder may only be claimed by one player. Wonders must be built in four parts, and each wonder has a different build cost. The winner is the first player to complete their wonder, or the first player to have 10 victory points and have more parts of their wonder complete than any other player.

=== The Great Crossing ===
The Great Crossing was a scenario in the older editions of Seafarers, which has been dropped in newer editions. The map is divided into two islands, Catan and Transcatania. Players begin with both settlements on one of the islands, and must build ships connecting settlements between the two islands. Players earn victory points for connecting their settlements with settlements (not necessarily theirs) from the opposite island using ships, or to another player's shipping lines which connect two settlements together.

=== Greater Catan ===
Greater Catan was a scenario included in the older editions of Seafarers but is not included in newer editions. Due to the sheer amounts of equipment needed, two copies of Settlers and Seafarers are required to set up this scenario. The map consists of a standard Settlers island, along with a smaller chain of outlying islands. Only the main island initially has number tokens: number tokens are assigned to the outlying islands as they are expanded. However, the supply of number tokens is smaller than the number of hexes in the scenario: when the number tokens run out and players expand into a new part of the outlying islands, number tokens are moved from the main island to the outlying islands.

Hexes on the main island for which there are no number tokens do not produce resources, but number tokens are moved in such a way so as to avoid rendering a city unproductive; furthermore, whenever possible number tokens must be reassigned from hexes bordering a player's own settlements and cities, so as to prevent harming another player's economy without harming a player's own economy at the same time.

=== New World ===
New World is a scenario that blankets all other scenarios that may be created from the parts of Settlers and Seafarers. This scenario uses an entirely random map, and players are encouraged to try and create a tile layout that plays well. The only difference between versions in Seafarers, the extension, and the older editions therein is the size of the frames.

== Reception ==
The Seafarers of Catan was reviewed in the online second volume of Pyramid.
