= United Soft Media =

German media publishing company

- Type: GmbH
- Industry: Software, radio plays, audio books
- Founded: 1994
- Headquarters: Munich
- Key people: Kurt Tomaszewski
- Revenue: 3 million euros (2007)
- Website: https://www.usm.de/

United Soft Media Verlag GmbH (USM) is a Munich-based publishing house focused on multimedia products for PC, Mac, Nintendo DS, Wii, iOS and Android. Radio plays and audio books, mainly for children and young people, are also produced. In 2013, Kosmos-Verlag became the main shareholder.

== History ==
Founded in 1994, the publisher established itself on the market after the turn of the millennium and published the PC and console games for Die Drei ??? in 2007, and the children's radio plays for the series Sternenpfad and Pumuckl. The company has major cooperation partners such as Computer Bild and Cinema.

In 2000 USM bought Systema Verlag.

On February 4, 2013, USM announced that Kosmos had become the majority shareholder of USM retroactively to January 1, 2013. USM was thus taken over by the previous majority owner Langen Müller Herbig nymphenburger terra magica.

In 2022, USM joined Games Bavaria Munich eV, making it now 20 studios.

On January 1, 2023, it was announced that USM was taking over the recording studio Headroom Sound Production. USM announced that nothing would change for the employees and that production of headroom and hearthroom would continue as usual.
