= Catan =

Multi-player competitive board game

- Other names: The Settlers of Catan
- Designers: Klaus Teuber
- Publishers: Kosmos (Germany); Catan Studio (English-language); Filosofia (France); 999 Games (Benelux); GP, Inc. (Japan); NeoTroy Games (Turkey); Korea Board Games (Korea); Smart (Russia); Devir (Mexico); Κάισσα (Greece); Devir (Brazil and Portugal); HaKubia (Israel); Galakta (Poland); Albi (Czech Republic and Slovakia); BrainGames (Latvia); spilbræt.dk (Denmark); Broadway Toys Limited (Mainland China and Hong Kong)
- Publication: First edition: 1995; 31 years ago; Second edition: 1996; 30 years ago; Third edition: 1997; 29 years ago; Fourth edition: 2007; 19 years ago; Fifth edition: June 2015; 11 years ago; Sixth edition: April 2025; 1 year ago
- Players: 3–4 (standard); 5–6 (with extensions)
- Setup time: 15 minutes
- Playing time: 1–2 hours
- Chance: low-moderate
- Age range: 10+
- Skills: Strategy; Negotiation
- Website: catan.com

Catan (/kəˈtæn, -ɑːn/), previously known as The Settlers of Catan (Note: German: Die Siedler von Catan, German: [diː ˈziːdlɐ fɔn kaˈtaːn]) or simply Settlers, is a multiplayer board game designed by Klaus Teuber. It was first published in 1995 in Germany by Franckh-Kosmos Verlag (Kosmos). The Settlers of Catan became one of the first Eurogames to achieve popularity outside Europe. As of 2020, more than 32 million boxed sets in 40 languages had been sold. The game and its many expansions are also published by Catan Studio, Filosofia, GP, Inc., 999 Games, (Káissa), and Devir.

In the game, players take on the roles of settlers, each attempting to build and develop holdings on the island of Catan while trading and acquiring different resources. Players gain victory points as their settlements grow, and the first to reach a set number of points (typically 10) wins.

== Gameplay ==
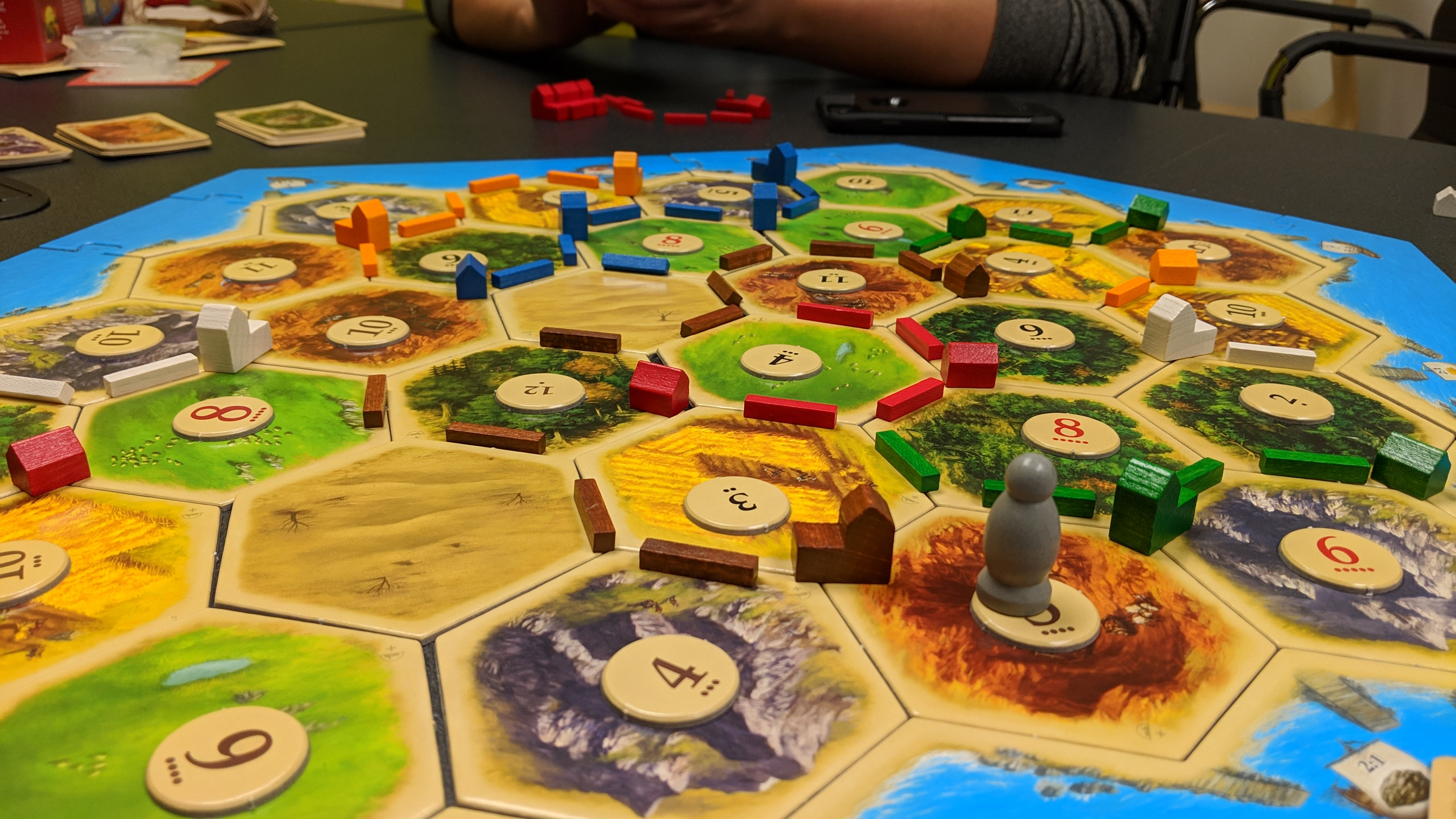
The hexes of the island of Catan, and the roads and settlements constructed on it

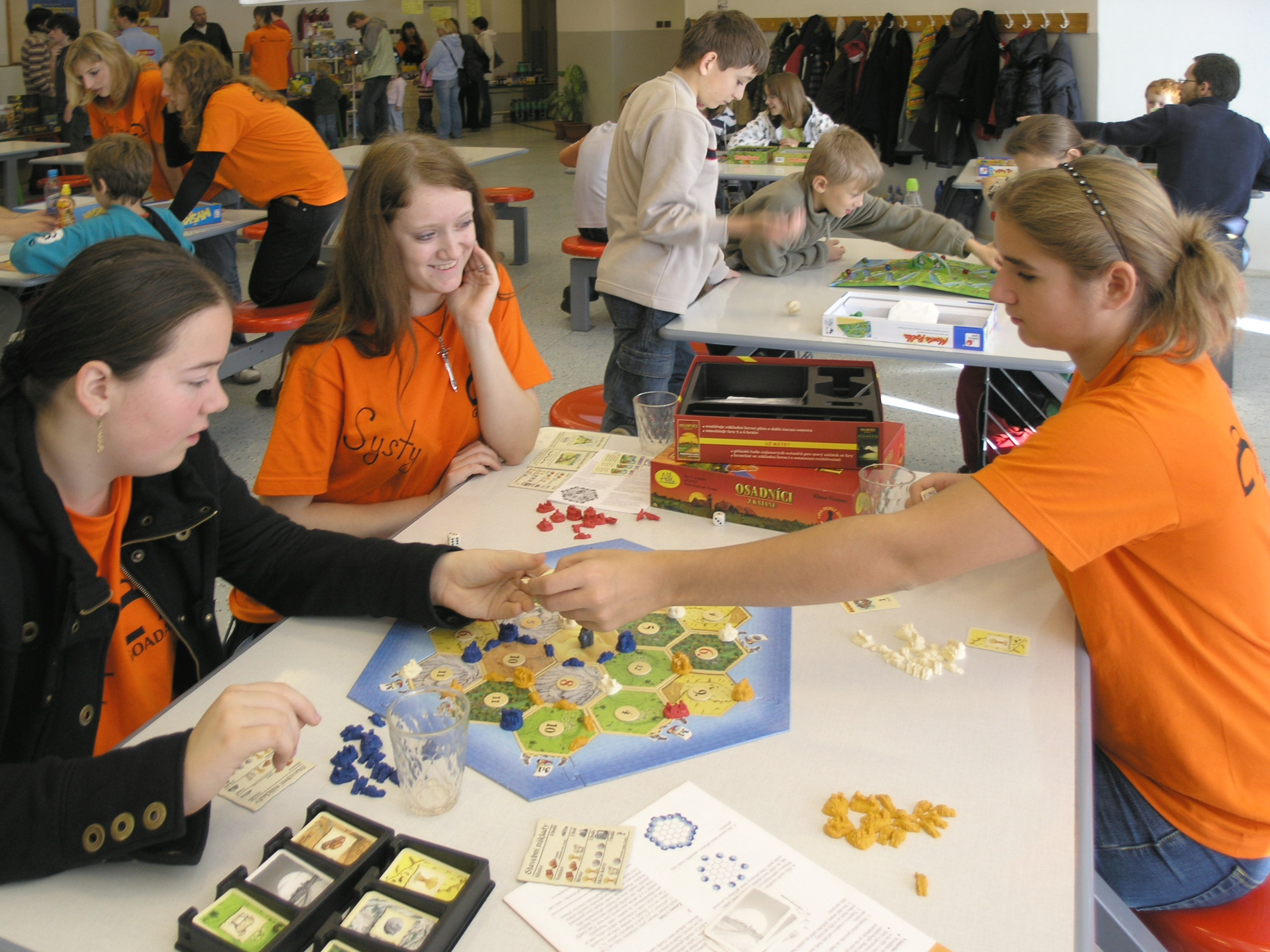
Three players in a game of Catan

The players in the game represent settlers establishing settlements on the fictional island of Catan. Players build settlements, cities, and roads to connect them as they settle the island. The game board, which represents the island, is composed of hexagonal tiles (hexes) of different land types, which are laid out randomly at the beginning of each game. Newer editions of the game began to depict a fixed layout in their manual and recommend this to be used by beginners. In 2016, editions of the game were released with a conventional fixed layout board in this configuration, the hexes of which cannot be rearranged.

Players build by spending resources (wool, grain, lumber, brick, and ore, or in older versions, wood, wheat, brick, ore, and sheep) that are depicted by these resource cards; each land type, with the exception of the unproductive desert, produces a specific resource: hills produce brick, forests produce lumber, mountains produce ore, fields produce grain, and pastures produce wool. On each player's turn, two six-sided dice are rolled to determine which hexes produce resources. Players with a settlement adjacent to a hex containing the number just rolled receive one card of the corresponding resource; cities produce two cards of the corresponding resource. For example, if a player has one city and two settlements adjacent to a grain hex, that player would take four grain resource cards if the corresponding number was rolled.

There is also a robber token, initially placed on the desert; if a player rolls 7, the robber must be moved to another hex, which will no longer produce resources until the robber is moved again. That player may also steal a resource card from another player with a settlement or city adjacent to the robber's new placement. In addition, when a 7 is rolled, all players with 8 or more resource cards must discard their choice of half of their cards, rounded down. For example, If a player has 9 resource cards, and a 7 is rolled, the player must get rid of 4 cards.

On the player's turn, the player may spend resource cards to build roads or settlements, upgrade settlements to cities (which replace existing settlements), or buy development cards. Players can trade resource cards with each other; players may also trade off-island (in effect, with the non-player bank) at a ratio of four-to-one resources for one of any other. By building settlements adjacent to ports, players may trade with the bank at three-to-one (three of any single resource type) or two-to-one (two of a specific resource) ratios, depending on the port.

The goal of the game is to reach ten victory points. Players score one point for each settlement they own and two for each city. Various other achievements, such as establishing the longest road and the largest army (by playing the most knight cards), grant a player additional victory points.

Resource cards can also be spent to buy a development card. There are five different types of development cards, including cards worth one victory point; knight cards, which allow the player to move the robber as if they had rolled a 7 (but without the remove-half rule); monopoly cards, which allow the player to steal all of any one resource from other players; road building cards, which allow the player to build two roads without paying extra resource cards; and year of plenty cards which allow the player to pick up two resource cards of their choice.

Teuber's original design was for a large game of exploration and development in a new land. Between 1993 and 1995 Teuber and Kosmos refined and simplified the game into its current form. Unused mechanics from that design went on to be used in Teuber's following games, Entdecker and Löwenherz. The game's first expansion, Catan: Seafarers, adds the concept of exploration, and the combined game (sometimes known as "New Shores") is probably the closest game to Teuber's original intentions.

A 2015 study found that the game had many opportunities for mathematical exploration in the classroom.

In 2020, the Board Game Analysis blog created a mathematical model to evaluate how balanced any particular board layout is, with scores ranging from 0 to 1 and lower scores being more balanced. According to that model, the beginner layout recommended in the game's manual has a balance score of 0.094. They also analyzed a board layout used in a 2016 tournament, which scored a 0.106. A sample of 100 million randomly generated board layouts formed an approximately normal distribution with the majority of boards' scores clustered around 0.25.

== Extensions, expansions, and updates ==
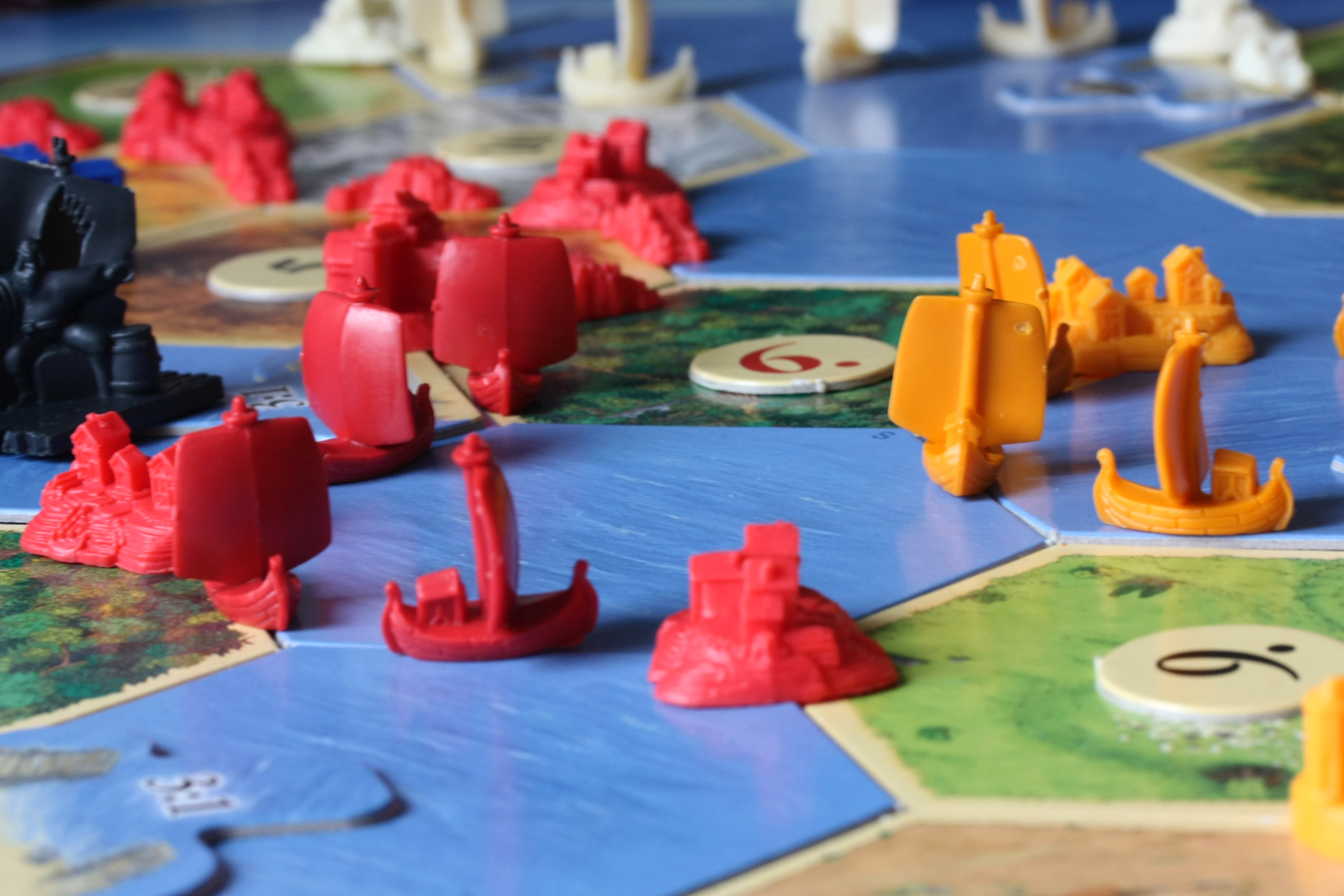
Plastic boat pieces from the Seafarers of Catan expansion

The base game of the Catan series, Catan, is designed for 3–4 players. In 1996, an extension to allow up to six players was released for the base game. As well as extra components to accommodate more players, the expansion adds an extra building phase between turns, so that players can participate in the game outside of their own turn. Players may not trade with other players during this phase nor may they trade in with the bank (maritime trade) from their own hand.

After releasing the 5- to 6-player extension, Teuber began to publish expansions for the base game. The first, Seafarers of Catan, was released in 1997; it was later retitled Catan: Seafarers. Seafarers adds ships that allow players to cross sea hexes, and includes scenarios in which players explore an archipelago of islands. It also adds gold-producing hexes that allow players to take the resource of their choice.

The second major expansion to the game, Cities and Knights of Catan (later Catan: Cities and Knights), was released in 1998. It adds concepts from the card game and its first expansion to Catan, including Knights who must be used to defend Catan from invading barbarians, and improvements that can be bought for cities that give benefits to players. Three commodities (paper, coin, and cloth) can be produced, in addition to the original resources. A 5- to 6-player extension for Cities & Knights was released at the same time. In 2000, a book of variations for Settlers was released.

The third large expansion, Catan: Traders & Barbarians, was released in 2008. Traders & Barbarians collects a number of smaller scenarios, some of which have previously been published elsewhere. The set includes an official two-player variant.

A special edition of the game was released in 2005: a 10th-anniversary collector's edition of the base game and Cities & Knights, with hand-painted 3D tiles and playing pieces.

Mayfair Games released a fourth edition of The Settlers of Catan in 2007, with new artwork, a locking frame, a deeper box, and an insert tray; there was also a minor rule change. Soon after its release, two changes were made to the fourth edition. The robber playing piece was changed from a black to a grey color and the soldier development card was renamed a knight. Fourth-edition versions of Cities & Knights, Seafarers, and the 5- to 6-player extensions were also released.

Catan: Explorers & Pirates, the fourth large expansion, was released in 2013. which introduces new elements for the game including moving ships, new resources, and pirates.

The Catan line was rebranded in 2015 for the 20th anniversary of the series, with the original Settlers game renamed simply Catan.

There are variations of the visual style of the game with subsequent releases. A list of version comparisons can be found here:

== Variants and scenarios ==
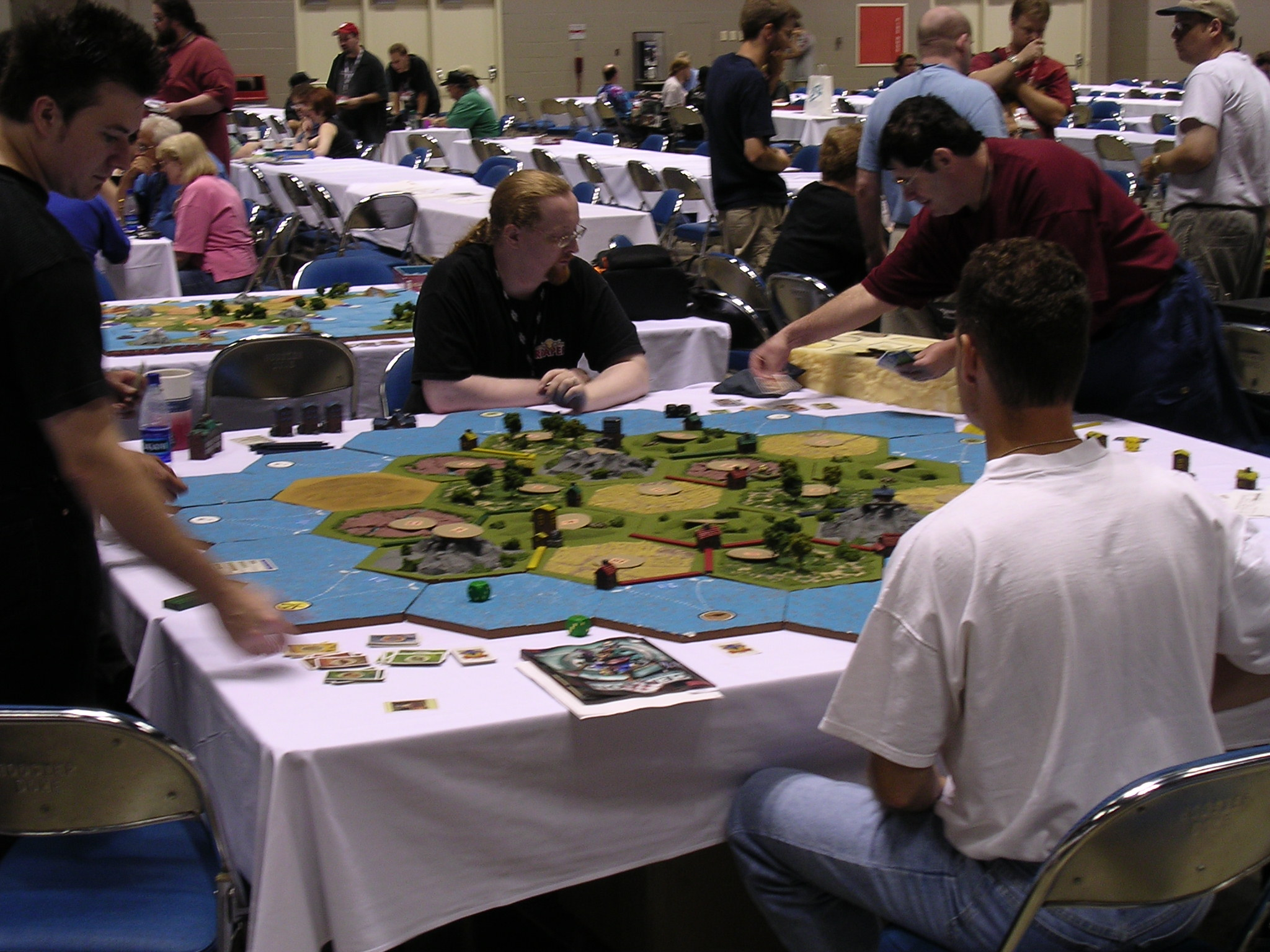
A giant game of Catan being played at Gen Con Indy 2003. This is one of many custom, extra-large Catan boards seen during demonstrations and tournaments at Gen Con.

In 1998, the first Historical Scenario pack was released, which allows players to re-enact the building of the pyramids of Egypt or the expansion of Alexander the Great's empire using Catan game mechanics. A second scenario pack for Settlers concerning the building of the Great Wall of China and the Trojan War was released in 2001.

Die Siedler von Catan: Das Buch zum Spielen was published in 2000. It contained the rules and pieces for 15 new scenarios and many variants.

Atlantis: Scenarios and Variants was published in 2005. Atlantis was a boxed set which collected a number of scenarios and variants published in gaming magazines and at conventions, such as The Volcano and The Great River. The set also included a deck of event cards which replaced the dice in the main game, giving it a less random spread of resource production. The event cards, which were also available as a standalone item, have since been re-released in a modified form in the Traders and Barbarians expansion.

Kosmos, Mayfair, and 999 Games released the first stand-alone "Catan Geographies" title, Catan Germany, in 2008.

In 2009, Schätze, Drachen und Entdecker ('Treasures, Dragons & Adventurers') was published. This was a scenario pack for fans that included six new scenarios and the pieces needed to play them. It was re-released in 2017 with artwork updated to match the 2015 fourth edition of Settlers of Catan. Treasures, Dragons & Adventurers will be available in English as of July 16, 2021.

Catan: Oil Springs is an expansion by Erik Assadourian and Ty Hansen introduced in 2011 designed to draw attention to environmental issues. It is offered as a free download or for purchase from the Mayfair Games website. The scenario adds oil fields that can be used to make other resources and develop metropolises, but disasters can strike if too much oil is used. Oil can also be taken out of the game, for victory points and to prevent disasters.

The scenario Catan: Frenemies was released in 2012. In Frenemies, players are rewarded with redeemable "favor tokens" for "helping" their opponents by moving the robber harmlessly, giving away resources, and connecting their roads to their opponents' road networks. Depending on the circumstances, these favors might not be helpful.

Helpers of Catan is an expansion released in 2013. The computer opponent characters from the PC/Mac game Catan – Cities & Knights return in this scenario as "helper cards", which can be used during gameplay; for example, the helper card for Candamir allows the player who uses it to substitute any one resource when buying a development card.

== Spinoffs and other related products ==
The popularity of The Settlers of Catan led to the creation of spinoff games and products, starting in 1996 with The Settlers of Catan card game (later renamed to Catan Card Game), and the 2003 novel, Die Siedler von Catan, by German historical fiction author Rebecca Gablé, which tells the story of a group of Norse seafarers who set out in search of the mythical island of Catan.

In 2002 a travel edition of Catan was published, featuring playing pieces which slot into a fixed-layout board.

In 1999, Starfarers of Catan was released. It was loosely based upon the original Catan, including similar dice mechanisms for resource production as well as trading and building. However, the spin-off also introduces spaceports, spaceships, and the flight mechanism.

The "Catan Histories" subseries includes Settlers of the Stone Age, a re-release of Struggle for Rome, Settlers of America, and Rise of the Inkas.

The Catan Dice Game was released in 2007. The game is played with six dice, the faces of which depict one of six resources (brick, lumber, wool, grain, ore, or gold). The dice are rolled up to three times, and the score of each roll is recorded by "building" roads, settlements, cities, and knights on a score sheet that shows a miniature version of the island of Catan. In the base game, one to four players try to get the highest score. There is also a "plus" version of the game, which, like the original Catan board game, is a race to be the first player to score 10 victory points.

In addition to the Catan Card Game above, two additional card game spinoffs have been published. Rivals for Catan, published in 2010, is a two-player strategy game for expert players that plays like a board game, and The Struggle for Catan, published in 2011, is a two- to four-player game that plays more like a card game and is suitable for Catan novices.

Catan Junior is a 2012 spinoff for families with children. The game is based on the original Settlers of Catan with a "pirate" theme and simpler rules. Players build "pirates' lairs" in the islands and build ships to reach new building sites. Resource and development cards are replaced with tiles, trading and building are simpler, and the "Ghost Captain" does not steal resources as the robber in the base game does.

Star Trek Catan is a spin-off of the original series released in 2012 by Mayfair Games. The game uses the same basic components with new names, new graphics, and some minor rules additions. The building costs and resources match the original game. It incorporates the "Helpers of Catan" expansion, with the cards renamed as Star Trek characters.

A Game of Thrones Catan: Brotherhood of the Watch is a spin-off based on George R. R. Martin's A Song of Ice and Fire series. As Brothers of the Night Watch, players harvest resources from the Gift to build settlements and keeps, while contributing to the defense of the Wall. The game was released in 2017 in English, German, Spanish, Italian, Polish, Russian, Czech/Slovak, Japanese, Brazilian Portuguese, Hebrew and French.

Catan: Dawn of Humankind is a spin-off featuring the first humans published by Catan Studios in 2022. Players move their tribe to explore new continents and establish camps.

In 2013, Mayfair released a series of mini-stuffed animals called "Catanimals", based on the different resources presented in the game. An updated set of Catanimal Sprite plushes was introduced in early 2021 and are based on new illustrated characters by artist Kay O'Neill.

== Reception ==
Pyramid magazine reviewed The Settlers of Catan and stated that "The Settlers of Catan is a very satisfying game of economic development and trading. [...] The game takes only 1.5 to 2 hours to play, but has as much satisfaction as games that take much longer."

Steve Faragher reviewed The Settlers of Catan for Arcane magazine in 1996, rating it a 10 out of 10 overall, and stating that he considered it "One of the finest, most sweetly designed and hugely entertaining games you'll ever get your grubby mitts on. Only a fool wouldn't buy a copy."

Catan became popular in the United States, with The Washington Post calling it "the board game of our time" in 2010. American video game designer Richard Dansky described Catan as "a hardcore game and a light social pastime and everything in between".

A 2012 American documentary film titled Going Cardboard (featuring Klaus Teuber) is about this game's impact on American gaming communities and what came of it.

In 2020, Erica Price noted that while Catan had become "a mid to late 2010s staple in popular culture," she argued that "the one place where Catan has seen a drop in popularity over the past decade is in its first world, that of hobby board games." She attributed this decline to a "lack of innovation," as well as "a reluctance to buy into the popularity of app-supported games (though solely mobile versions of Catan exist), crowdfunding, and new mechanics."

=== Awards ===
- 1995: Spiel des Jahres Game of the Year
- 1995: Deutscher Spiele Preis 1st place
- 1995: Essen Feather
- 1995: Meeples' Choice Award
- 1996: Origins Award for Best Fantasy or Science Fiction Board Game
- 2001: Origins Hall of Fame
- 2004: Czech Game of the Year Award (Hra Roku)
- 2005: Game of the Year (Gra Roku)
- 2006: Games Magazine Hall of Fame
- 2015: GamesCom Vegas Game of the Century

== Video games ==
Since the game's release, a number of computer games have been published based on Settlers of Catan and its spinoffs. The first sanctioned English-language release was Catan: The Computer Game, developed for the PC by Castle Hill Studios and published by Big Fish Games. This off-line game was available from MSN, as it was acquired by Microsoft who also released Catan Online in August 2005 on MSN Games, the game now requiring an internet connection. In 2005, Capcom edited the first portable version of Settlers of Catan on the N-Gage Nokia handheld device.

In June 2009 the MSN version of Settlers was discontinued. The same game later became available on other online services. Teuber and Big Huge Games worked together to produce Catan, a version of Settlers for the Xbox Live Arcade. It was released on 2 May 2007. Game Republic developed a PlayStation 3 version in 2008 titled also Catan.

A Nintendo DS version of Settlers was developed by Exozet Games GmbH in collaboration with Klaus Teuber. The game can be played against computer opponents, and includes Nintendo WiFi online play. It was released in 2009, but only in Europe.

The Settlers of Catan online game was announced on 16 December 2002. Catan Online World allows players to download a Java application that serves as a portal for the online world and allows online play with other members. The base game may be played for free, while expansions require a subscription membership.

Two official PC versions of Catan have been released, The First Island (the basic game only) and Cities & Knights (with Seafarers and Cities & Knights expansions). The First Island is available for the PC only in German. Cities & Knights was available in both English and German.

Catan and some of its expansions are also available in various languages for mobile phones, iPhone, iPad, iPod Touch, BlackBerry and Android smartphones. A 2009 version was developed by Exozet Games and published by United Soft Media for iOS in 2009–2010, for Android in 2011, and for Windows Mobile in 2013.

Catan was released on Xbox Live Arcade in 2007. It was pulled without notice in mid-2014. There is no official word on why it was pulled or if it will return. Another game called Catan was released for the PlayStation Network in 2008. This version is an original adaptation of the board game, not a port of the 2007 XBLA adaptation by Big Huge Games. GameSpot gave the PlayStation game 7 out of 10 and called it "a captivating experience". It also has been discontinued.

Mayfair Games announced in 2010 that a version of Catan was coming to Facebook.

In 2010, Vectorform showcased a Microsoft PixelSense game for Settlers of Catan. USM also developed an Android and iOS mobile app version simply called "Catan" with the various expansions available as DLC.

In August 2013, Catan: Creators Edition was made available for PC on Steam and Mac OS X in the Mac App Store. Catan: Creators Edition officially replaces the previous Catan: Cities & Knights. The game features both Seafarers plus the Cities & Knights expansions and includes a level editor.

In the summer of 2014, Bontom Games collaborated with Catan GmbH and Internet Explorer to develop an asynchronous version of Catan. Catan Anytime is a short-session, turn-based game designed for mainstream gamers. On 10 June 2016, Catan Anytime announced on their Facebook page that Catan Anytime had shut down operations. The web site catananytime.com is no longer available.

A balanced setup from Catan Universe – each circled number gives the relative frequency that an adjacent hex is rolled.

In April 2017, Catan Universe launched. Catan GmbH collaborated with Exozet and United Soft Media to make a cross platform version of Catan. Catan Universe is available in web, Steam, Amazon, iOS and Android platforms. While the Steam version has an average score, the mobile versions have a higher score of 4/5 stars. The game gained popularity during the COVID-19 pandemic in 2019/20 with a large number of new players, which overwhelmed servers at times.

In December 2017, the unlicensed and unendorsed website Colonist.io was launched. Colonist.io then experienced significant growth during the COVID-19 pandemic. It's monthly active users increased from approximately 53,000 in January 2020 to 702,000 in January 2021, an increase of approximately 1,200%.

On June 20, 2019, a version of Catan was released for Nintendo Switch, being developed by United Soft Media and Exozet, and being published by Asmodee Digital.

In November 2019, Niantic, Inc. announced that it was developing a new augmented reality mobile game, Catan: World Explorers. The game is to be based on the Catan board games; players will move through the real world, using their smartphones to build a Catan universe. However, during September 2021 Niantic announced the augmented reality game would be shut down after a year of early access without actually releasing it.

In November 2021, Dovetail Games and Asmodee Entertainment announced their intentions to bring a "digital tabletop" version of Catan to PlayStation 4, PlayStation 5, Xbox One and Xbox Series X/S. This project is a collaboration between Dovetail Games, Asmodee, Catan GmbH and Nomad Games. Dovetail Games are known for their simulation products, notably Train Simulator, Train Sim World and Bassmaster Fishing 2022.

== Film/television adaptation ==
A short film titled The Lord of Catan was released in 2014. Actors Amy Acker and Fran Kranz starred in the film as a married couple enmeshed in an increasingly intense game of Catan.

In February 2015, Variety announced that producer Gail Katz had purchased the film and TV rights to The Settlers of Catan. Katz said, "The island of Catan is a vivid, visual, exciting and timeless world with classic themes and moral challenges that resonate today. There is a tremendous opportunity to take what people love about the game and its mythology as a starting point for the narrative". In October 2017, Variety reported that Sony Pictures was negotiating to acquire the rights to adapt it into a film, with Gail Katz still attached to the project. Netflix acquired the global rights to develop Catan in several audio-visual works in October 2025, including a film and television series.

Netflix is developing a comprehensive universe of film and television adaptations based on Catan, in partnership with Asmodee and Catan Studio. The project includes both live-action and animated, scripted, and unscripted content, with producers including Teuber's sons, Benjamin and Guido Teuber. In October 2026, Aaron and Adam Nee were announced to write and direct a feature film.

== Tournaments ==
=== U.S. National Championship ===
Every year, thousands of Americans compete at local qualifying Catan tournaments in the United States. The winners of those tournaments are then guaranteed a seat at the Catan United States National Championship.

During the 2024 Catan US National Championship, Drew Elliott, a Catan YouTuber known as DandyDrew, won the final event in Saint Paul Minnesota on September 8, 2024. Drew represented the US at the 2025 World Championships in Germany.

=== World Championship ===
The first Catan World Championship was held in 2002 at the game fair "Internationalen Spieltage" in Essen, Germany. It took place there every year until 2008, when it was hosted at Gen Con Indy, in the United States. Since then, the Catan World Championship has taken place every two years, with the location alternating between the United States and Germany.

In 2018, there were participants in the World Championship from over forty countries. A maximum of two players per country are allowed to participate.

To be eligible to compete in the World Championship, all players must be over the age of 18, as well as a citizen or permanent resident of the country in which they are competing.

The World Championship is structured in three rounds: the preliminary round, the semifinals, and the finals. The preliminary round consists of three games, of which the top sixteen players advance to the semifinals. The semifinals are seeded based first on wins, then points, and then the quality of victory (percentage of total points earned per game) in the preliminary round games. The winner of each semifinal game then advances to the finals. The winner of the finals becomes the Catan World Champion.

The 2020 championship was postponed because of the COVID-19 pandemic; it was eventually held in Valletta, Malta, in 2022.

Here is a list of past winners and finalists of the Catan World Championship.

Date	Location	Winner	2nd place	3rd place
2002	Essen, Germany	(Republic of Ireland) Jacques Kieft	(Germany) Michel Hirschfeld	(Netherlands) Hans Baert
2003	Essen, Germany	(Germany) Michel Hirschfeld	(Spain) Samuel Fuentes	(Finland) Lasse Rintakumpu
2004	Essen, Germany	(Italy) Francesco Ferrari	(Denmark) Claus Sørensen	(Japan) Katsumi Takahasi
2005	Essen, Germany	(Czech Republic) Jiří Buchta	(Netherlands) Frans de Bode	(Republic of Ireland) Shane Cassells
2006	Essen, Germany	(Finland) Markus Nuopponen	(Japan) Shinya Ohi	(Germany) Thomas Sander
2007	Essen, Germany	(Latvia) Arnis Buka	(United Kingdom) Alan Farrell	(Finland) Markus Nuopponen
2008	(United States) Indianapolis, USA	(United States) Todd Sweet	(Australia) Rohan Flavelle	(United States) Matt McLaughlin
2010	Leibertingen, Germany	(Netherlands) Erwin Pauëlsen	(Latvia) Maris Logins	(Finland) Mauri Sahlberg
2012	(United States) Philadelphia, USA	(Austria) Herbert Schager	(Hong Kong) Chi Wai Chan	(Lithuania) Justinas Noreika
2014	Berlin, Germany	(Estonia) Sander Stroom	(Japan) Yoshitaka Matsumoto	(Latvia) Kristofers Ritovs
2016	(United States) Durango, USA	(United States) William Cavaretta	(Spain) Raúl Fernández Menéndez	(Czech Republic) Petr Frajvald
2018	Cologne, Germany	(Mexico) Quetzal Hernández Jiménez	(Colombia) José Miguel Ferrario Parrado	(Germany) Markus Heinze
2022	Valletta, Malta	(New Zealand) Hamish Dean	(United States) Eric Freeman	(Italy) Emanuele Scapaticci
2025	Stuttgart, Germany	(Canada) Kohulan Narendran	(Italy) Guido Grossi	(Mexico) Raul Jimenez

=== Online tournaments ===
There are various short-form, long-form, and ongoing online Catan tournaments, including the Digital CATAN World Championship (DCWC), which debuted in autumn 2021, with a qualification round from August to October and a finals round held on 13 November.

== See also ==
- List of world championships in mind sports
- Going Cardboard (Documentary, includes an interview with Klaus Teuber)

== Notes ==
Awards
Preceded by Manhattan	Spiel des Jahres; 1995	Succeeded by El Grande
Preceded by 6 nimmt!	Deutscher Spiele Preis; 1995	Succeeded by El Grande
